= List of Eastern Orthodox monasteries in the United States =

The following is a list of Eastern Orthodox Christian monasteries and sketes, both male and female, in the United States of America.

== Antiochian Orthodox Christian Archdiocese of North America ==
- Monastery of Saint Thekla, Ligoneir Pennsylvania. Women's Monastery. Status: Inactive.
- Monastery of the Life-Giving Trinity, Grand Junction, Tennessee. Male Monastery. Superior: Hieromonk Paul.
- The Monastery of Our Lady and St. Laurence, Canon City, Colorado. Abbot: Father Theodore.

== Bulgarian Eastern Orthodox Diocese of the USA, Canada, and Australia ==
- St. John the Baptist Monastery, Warwick, MA. Male Monastery.

== Ecumenical Patriarchate institutions in America ==
=== Stavropegial Monasteries ===
- Sacred Patriarchal and Stavropegial Monastery of St. Irene Chrysovalantou, Astoria, New York. Abbot: Bishop Ierotheos Zakharis.
- Holy Patriarchal And Stavropegic Monastery Of The Entrance Of The Theotokos, Malbis, Alabama.

=== Greek Orthodox Archdiocese of America ===
This archdiocese has had a small number of formerly Athonite monks who were given a blessing to start monasteries. In recognition of this, any such spiritual father of a monastery will be listed.

==== Male ====
- St. Gregory Palamas Monastery, Hayesville, Ohio. Abbot, Archimandrite Joseph.
- St. Anthony's Greek Orthodox Monastery, Florence, Arizona. Abbot: Archimandrite Paisios. Spiritual Father: Elder Ephraim of Arizona.
- Holy Archangels Greek Orthodox Monastery, Kendalia, Texas. Archimandrite Dositheos. Spiritual Father: Elder Ephraim of Arizona.
- Panagia Vlahernon Greek Orthodox Monastery, Williston, Florida. Archimandrite Polycarp. Spiritual Father: Elder Ephraim of Arizona.
- Holy Trinity Monastery Greek Orthodox Monastery, Smith Creek, Michigan. Hieromonk Joseph. Spiritual Father: Elder Ephraim of Arizona.
- Panagia Pammakaristou Greek Orthodox Monastery, Lawsonville, North Carolina. Hieromonk Nektarios. Spiritual Father: Elder Ephraim of Arizona.
- St. Nektarios Greek Orthodox Monastery, Roscoe, New York. Archimandrite Joseph. Spiritual Father: Elder Ephraim of Arizona.
- Holy Transfiguration Greek Orthodox Monastery, Harvard, Illinois. Father Akakios. Spiritual Father: Ephraim of Arizona.
- St. Arsenius Hermitage, Decatur, Texas. Father Gregory.

==== Female ====
- Entrance of the Mother of God into the Temple Skete, Hayesville, Ohio. Abbess Theadelphi. Spiritual Father: Archimandrite Joseph.
- Nativity of the Theotokos Greek Orthodox Monastery, Saxonburg, Pennsylvania. Abbess Theophano. Spiritual Father: Elder Ephraim of Arizona.
- Holy Protection Greek Orthodox Monastery, White Haven, Pennsylvania. Abbess Olympiada. Spiritual Father: Elder Ephraim of Arizona.
- St. John Chrysostom Greek Orthodox Monastery, Pleasant Prairie, Wisconsin. Abbess Melanie. Spiritual Father: Elder Ephraim of Arizona.
- The Living Spring Greek Orthodox Monastery, Dunlap, California. Abbess Markella. Spiritual Father: Elder Ephraim of Arizona.
- St. John the Forerunner Greek Orthodox Monastery, Goldendale, Washington. Abbess Efpraxia. Spiritual Father: Elder Ephraim of Arizona.
- Holy Annunciation Greek Orthodox Monastery, Reddick, Florida. Abbess Agapia. Spiritual Father: Elder Ephraim of Arizona.
- Panagia Prousiotissa Greek Orthodox Monastery, Troy, North Carolina. Abbess Agne. Spiritual Father: Elder Ephraim of Arizona.
- St. Paraskevi Greek Orthodox Monastery, Washington, Texas. Abbess Paraskevi. Spiritual Father: Elder Ephraim of Arizona.
- All Saints Greek Orthodox Monastery, Calverton, Long Island, New York. Abbess Eisodia.
- Paracletos Greek Orthodox Monastery, Abbeville, South Carolina. Abbess Pavlina.

== Orthodox Church in America ==
- Companions of New Skete (Emmaus House), Cambridge, New York. Superior: Sr Melanie Updike.
- Ss. Sergius and Herman of Valaam Chapel, Spruce Island, Alaska.
- Protecting Veil of the Theotokos Orthodox Community, Anchorage, Alaska.

=== Male ===
- Athonite Saints Orthodox Hermitage, Hanover, Illinois. Superior: Father Savvas.
- St. Tikhon's Orthodox Monastery, South Canaan, Pennsylvania. Abbot: Archimandrite Sergius (Bowyer).
- New Skete, Cambridge, New York. Prior: Father Christopher.
- The Ascension of Our Lord Monastery, Detroit, Michigan. Superior: Archimandrite Mihail.
- Monastery of the Holy Archangel Michael, Canones, New Mexico. Abbot: Monk Silouan. (Julian Calendar)
- St. John of Shanghai Monastery, Manton, California. Superior: Hieromonk Innocent (Green).
- Holy Cross Monastery, Castro Valley, California. Superior: Archimandrite Theodor (Micka).
- Hermitage of the Annunciation (Goose Chase Monastery), Watford, Nova Scotia. Superior: Hieromonk Roman (Bonnel).
- Hermitage of St. Anthony the Great, Westport, Ontario. Superior: Monk Pierre (Vachon).
- Holy Transfiguration Hermitage, Gibsons, British Columbia.
- St. John the Baptist Monastery, Phoenix, Arizona.
- St Romanos Hermitage, Williamston, Michigan. Superior: Father Cosmos. (Bulgarian Diocese of the OCA).

=== Female ===
- Holy Assumption Monastery, Calistoga, California. Superior: Mother Melania.
- Ss. Mary and Martha Monastery, Wagener, South Carolina. Mother Thekla.
- Holy Myrrhbearers Monastery, Otego, New York. Mother Raphaela.
- Our Lady of the Sign Monastery (Nuns of New Skete), Cambridge, New York. Mother Cecelia.
- Orthodox Monastery of the Transfiguration, Ellwood City, Pennsylvania. Mother Christophora.
- Dormition of the Mother of God Monastery, Rives Junction, Michigan. Mother Gabriella.
- Protection of the Holy Virgin Monastery, Lake George, Colorado. Mother Cassiana.
- St Barbara Monastery, Santa Paula, California. Mother Victoria.
- Our Lady of Kazan Skete, Santa Rosa, California. Mother Suzanna.
- Nativity of Our Lord & Savior Jesus Christ Monastery, Kemp, Texas. Mother Barbara.
- Holy Resurrection Monastery, Niangua, Missouri. Mother Alexandra.

== Romanian Orthodox Archdiocese in the Americas ==
=== Male ===
- Holy Cross Orthodox Monastery, Toronto (York), Ontario, Canada. Archimandrite Nicolas (Giroux).
- Monastère de la Protection-de-la-Mère-de-Dieu, Wentworth, Québec, Canada. Higoumène Cyrille (Bradette).
- St. Dumitru Retreat and Monastic Centre, Middletown, New York, United States. Hieromonk Theoctist.

=== Female ===
- Protection of the Mother of God Monastery, Ellenville, New York, United States. Mother Ambrozia.
- Holy Annunciation Hermitage, 10087 W. Rolling Meadows Dr., Westville, IN 46391. Mother Theodora.
- Holy Dormition of the Mother of God, 3389 Rives Eaton Rd, Rives Junction, MI 49277. Marian Cristian Rosu.

== Russian Orthodox Church ==
=== Moscow Patriarchate ===
==== Male ====
- St. Demetrios of Thessaloniki Monastery, Framingham, Massachusetts. Abbot: Hieromonk Savvatey (Ageyev).

=== Russian Orthodox Church Outside of Russia ===
==== Male ====
- All-Merciful Saviour Monastery, Vashon Island, Washington. Superior: Abbot Tryphon.
- Christ the Saviour Monastery, Hamilton, Ontario. Western Rite. Superior: Abbot James (Deschene)
- Holy Cross Monastery, Wayne, West Virginia. Abbot: Igumen Gabriel.
- Holy Great Martyr and Healer Panteleimon Skete, Coconut Creek, FL. Abbot: Archimandrite Maximos (Weimar). Dependency of the Monastery of the Glorious Ascension.
- Holy Trinity Monastery, Jordanville, New York. Abbot: Bishop Luke (Murianka).
- Monastery of Saint Dionysios the Areopagite, St. James, New York. Abbot: Hieromonk Vasileios (Willard).
- New Kursk-Root Icon Hermitage (Residence of Bishop Jerome (Shaw), Mahopac, New York.
- Our Lady of the Angels Hermitage (Na Pua Li'i Hermitage), Kapaau, HI. Superior: Hieromonk Columba.
- Saint Anthony the Great Orthodox Monastery, Phoenix, Arizona. Stavropegial Monastery under the President of the Synod of Bishops, founded in 1983; Abbot: Hieromonk Hilarion.
- Saint Demetrios of Thessaloniki Skete, Spotsylvania, Virginia. Superior: Metropolitan Jonah Paffhausen.
- Saint Paul the Apostle Monastery, Boscobel, Wisconsin. Superior: Father Menas.
- Skete of St. John the Theologian, Hiram, Ohio. Superior: Hieromonk Nektarios.
- St. Sabbas Russian Orthodox Monastery, Harper Woods, Michigan. Abbot: Archimandrite Pachomy.

==== Female ====
- Monastery of the Dormition, Stavropegial Convent of the Dormition Novo-Diveevo, Nanuet, New York. Superior: Abbess Makaria.
- Convent of the Great Martyr Catherine, Sonora, California. (Formerly St Silouan the Athonite). Consecrated in 2015. Superior: Abbess Catherine.
- Convent of St Elizabeth, Mohawk, New York. Superior: Mother Elisabeth.
- Convent of the Nativity, Wayne, West Virginia. Superior: Nun Theodora.
- Monastery of the Glorious Ascension, Resaca, Georgia.
- New Tikhvin Skete of the Holy Mother of God, Palm Coast, Florida. Superior: Mother Elizabeth (Klipa - Bacha)
- St. Paisius Monastery, Safford, Arizona. Superior: Abbess Michaila.

== Serbian Orthodox Church ==
- Holy Ascension Serbian Orthodox Monastery in Youngwood, Pennsylvania. Administrator: Very Reverend Rumen Stoychev.
- Most Holy Mother of God Serbian Orthodox Monastery in Springboro, Pennsylvania.
- Monastery of the Meeting of the Lord Serbian Orthodox Monastery in Escondido, California. Administrator: V. Rev. Protopresbyter Milovan Kantić.
- Holy Archangel Michael and All Angels Skete is the collective term for several monastic communities in Weatherby, Missouri: St. Xenia Sisterhood and Protection of the Virgin Mary. Superiors: Hieromonk Alexii; Abbess Brigid; and Abbess Sergia, respectively. Under the spiritual jurisdiction of Metropolitan Longin Krčo of the Serbian Orthodox Eparchy of New Gračanica and Midwestern America.
- Saint Nikolaj Velimirović of Žiča Serbian Orthodox Monastery in China, Michigan. Caretaker: Radiša Ninković.
- Mother of God, Joy of All Who Sorrow Serbian Orthodox Monastery in Monteagle, Tennessee. Under the spiritual jurisdiction of Bishop Longin.
- All Serbian Saints Serbian Orthodox Monastery in Columbus Township, St. Clair County, Michigan. In 2015, a four-hectare property was purchased by Serbian faithful on behalf of the defrocked bishop Artemije Radosavljević of the Eparchy of Raška and Prizren-in-exile. The monastery is entirely independent of the Serbian Orthodox Church, however, the liturgical service is the same.

=== Male ===
- Saint Sava Serbian Orthodox Monastery and Seminary in Libertyville, Illinois.
- New Gračanica Serbian Orthodox Monastery in Third Lake, Illinois.
- Saint Mark Serbian Orthodox Monastery in Sheffield, Ohio.
- Saint Herman of Alaska Monastery in Platina, California. Administrators: V. Rev. Hieromonk Abbot Damascene and Rev. Hieromonk Paisius.
- St. Archangel Michael Skete in Ouzinkie, Alaska. Administrator: Rev. Hieromonk Andrew. Associated with St. Herman of Alaska Monastery.

=== Female ===
- Saint Xenia Serbian Orthodox Monastery in Lake Wildwood, California. Administrator Rev. Mother Abbess Dorothea. Sister monastery of St. Herman of Alaska Monastery.
- St. Nilus Skete in Ouzinkie, Alaska. Administrator: Rev. Mother Abbess Nina. Associated with St. Herman of Alaska Monastery.
- Nativity of the Mother of God Serbian Orthodox Patriarchal Monastery, New Carlisle, Indiana. Double monastery: Igumanija Evpraksija and Igumen Gavrilo.
- Serbian Orthodox Monastery of Saint Archangel Gabriel - New Marcha in Richfield, Ohio. Mother Anna.
- Saint Paisius Serbian Orthodox Monastery in Safford, Arizona. Mother Michaila. Now under two jurisdictions, bishops Kyrill of San Francisco and Western America (ROCOR) and Maksim of the Serbian Orthodox Eparchy of Western America.
- Saint Xenia Metochion Serbian Orthodox Monastery in Indianapolis, Indiana. Nun Katherine, Superior.
- Saint Pachomious Serbian Orthodox Monastery in Greenfield, Missouri.

== Greek Orthodox Old Calendarists ==
See Greek Old Calendarists, as they are separated from Eucharistic communion with the local Orthodox Churches.

=== Male ===
Holy Orthodox Church in North America

- Holy Transfiguration Greek Orthodox Monastery (Boston Monks), Brookline, Massachusetts. Abbot Isaac.
- Holy Ascension Skete, York, Maine

Autonomous Orthodox Metropolia of North and South America and the British Isles

- Abbey of the Holy Name, West Milford, New Jersey (Western Rite).

Church of the Genuine Orthodox Christians of Greece

- Monastery of the Holy Ascension, Woodstock, New York. Metropolitan Demetrios.
- St. Gregory Palamas Monastery, Etna, California. Abbot Archimandrite Akakios
- St. John of San Francisco Orthodox Monastery, Cobleskill, New York. Abbot Metropolitan Demetrios
  - Monastery of the Dormition of the Holy Theotokos, Preston Hollow, New York. Igoumen Hieromonk Damian. Dependency of St. John of San Francisco Orthodox Monastery
  - St. John the New Almsgiver Hermitage Argyle, Nova Scotia Dependency of St. John of San Francisco Orthodox Monastery
  - Monastery of Saint John the Theologian, Montreal, Quebec, Canada Dependency of St. John of San Francisco Orthodox Monastery
  - Hermitage of St. Ignatius the God-bearer, Santa Cruz Naranja, Guatemala Dependency of St. John of San Francisco Orthodox Monastery
- Monastery of Saint Gregory of Sinai, Kelseyville, California. Abbot Bishop Sergios of Portland

=== Female ===
Holy Orthodox Church in North America

- Holy Nativity Convent, Brookline, Massachusetts. Abbess Mother Seraphima
- Convent of Saint Mary Magdalene, Warrenton, Virginia. Abbess Mother Eirene

Church of the Genuine Orthodox Christians of Greece

- Saint Syncletike Monastery, Farmingdale, New York. Metropolitan Demetrios.
- Convent of St. Anna, Montreal, Quebec, Canada
- Convent of the Protection of the Holy Virgin Mary, Bluffton, Alberta, Canada
- Convent of St. Elizabeth the Grand Duchess of Russia, Etna, California. Abbess Mother Elizabeth
