= St. Nilus Skete =

Serbian Orthodox monastery in Nelson Island, Alaska

St. Nilus Skete is an Eastern Orthodox Christian women's monastic institution located on Nelson Island (also known as St. Nilus Island) near Ouzinkie in Alaska, less than an hour's boat ride from Kodiak Island. It was founded in 1999 and is under the omophorion of Bishop Maksim of the Serbian Orthodox Eparchy of Western America of the Serbian Orthodox Church.

St. Nilus Skete is the most remote of all 80 Orthodox Christian monasteries in North America. Their 50-acre island is inhabited only by the monastics. In the winter months when the ocean becomes rough, the nuns on St. Nilus Island can be left isolated from the rest of civilization for days and weeks at a time.

St. Archangel Michael Skete is geographically close to St. Nilus Skete, and they help the nuns with fishing and other tasks. It is called a “skete” because the nuns live in separate cabins in the forest, although in practice it functions as a traditional, Orthodox cenobitic monastery. The nuns use a small skiff or kayaks to get to and from their abode to buy necessary supplies. Throughout the summer when days are longer and the seas are calm, the skiff brings pilgrims to the island.

The nuns follow the monastic tradition of a small, self-sufficient skete, a model handed down by their patron St. Nilus of Sora and others. The sisters have daily services in their chapel and personal prayer time in their cabins. They support themselves through making prayer ropes and greeting cards of Alaskan Saints, as well as by doing their own fishing and gardening. They chop wood for the wood stoves to heat their cabins. Since they lack running water, they carry buckets of water from a spring. They intentionally do not have enough electricity for most appliances so that they may enjoy the spiritual and physiological benefits of manual labor.

In 2021, they published a book on the spiritual life of monastics, entitled “The Angelic Life: A Vision of Orthodox Monasticism,” written by their spiritual father, Hieromonk Ephraim.

== See also ==
- St. Archangel Michael Skete
- Saint Herman of Alaska Monastery
- Saint Paisius Serbian Orthodox Monastery
- Saint Xenia Serbian Orthodox Monastery
- List of Serbian Orthodox monasteries
- List of Eastern Orthodox monasteries in the United States
