= Saint Herman of Alaska Monastery =

Serbian Orthodox monastery in Platina, California

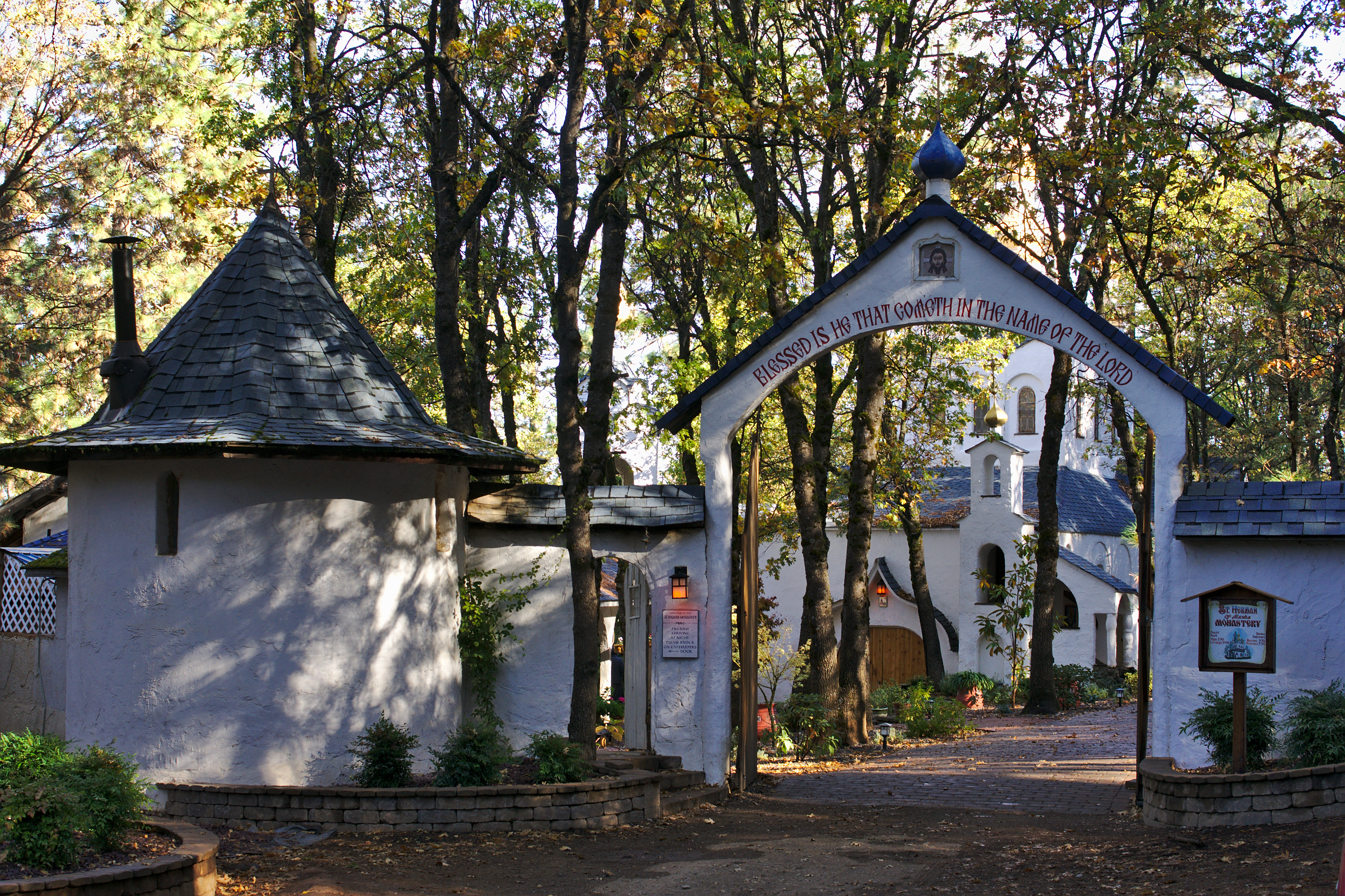
- Saint Herman of Alaska Monastery
- Interactive map of Saint Herman of Alaska Monastery

Monastery information
- Order: Serbian Orthodox Church
- Established: 1967
- Dedication: Saint Herman of Alaska
- Diocese: Serbian Orthodox Eparchy of Western America

People
- Abbot: Damascene (Christensen)
- Important associated figures: Seraphim Rose

Site
- Location: Platina, California
- Coordinates: 40.3470°N 122.9000°W

The Saint Herman of Alaska Monastery is an Eastern Orthodox Christian monastery located in Platina, California. It is under jurisdiction of the Serbian Orthodox Eparchy of Western America of the Serbian Orthodox Church.

== History ==
The monastery was founded by Seraphim Rose and Herman Podmoshensky in 1968 with the blessing of Bishop John Maximovitch of the Diocese of San Francisco and Western America of the Russian Orthodox Church Outside of Russia. The monastery was founded in 1970 and only since 2000, the monastics serve under the omophorion of Bishop Maksim of the Serbian Orthodox Eparchy of Western America. The monks there lead ascetic lives.

The monastery is frequented by pilgrims.

== Activities and administration ==
The current abbot of the monastery is Hieromonk Damascene (Christensen).

There are four Serbian monasteries affiliated with the Saint Herman of Alaska Brotherhood: Saint Herman of Alaska Monastery (Platina, California), Saint Xenia Serbian Orthodox Monastery (Wildwood, California), St. Nilus Skete (Ouzinkie, Alaska), and St. Archangel Michael Skete (Ouzinkie, Alaska).

== Publications ==
Saint Herman Monastery is known for its publications in the English language. The brotherhood produces and prints original books; translates major Orthodox works into English; and publishes a bimonthly periodical, The Orthodox Word, and the annual Saint Herman Church Calendar. This is done through the monastery's publishing house, Saint Herman Press, located at the Saint Xenia Serbian Orthodox Monastery in Wildwood, California.

In 1994, nuns and monks of the monastery started Death to the World zine.

== Abbots ==
- Herman (Podmoshensky) (c. 1970 – c. 2000)
- Gerasim (Eliel) (2000–2009)
- Hilarion (Waas) (2009–2013)
- Damascene (Christensen) (July 20, 2013–Present)

== See also ==
- Serbian Orthodox Church in North and South America
- List of Serbian Orthodox monasteries
- List of Eastern Orthodox monasteries in the United States
