= List of Eastern Orthodox parishes in Alaska =

This is a list of parishes of Eastern Orthodox Christianity in Alaska, United States. Eastern Orthodoxy in North America is divided into several separate Eastern Orthodox Churches Most parishes in Alaska are members of the Diocese of Sitka and Alaska, Orthodox Church in America, the historical descendant of the Mission to Alaska dispatched by the Russian Orthodox Church in 1893.

As of 2026 there are also parishes of the Antiochian Orthodox Christian Archdiocese of North America, the Russian Orthodox Church Outside Russia, and two monasteries of the Serbian Orthodox Eparchy of Western America.

== Aleutians East Borough ==
=== Adak ===
- St. Innocent Chapel (OCA-Unalaska)

=== Akutan ===
- St. Alexander Nevsky Chapel (OCA-Unalaska)

=== Belkofski ===
- Holy Resurrection Church (OCA-Unalaska)

=== False Pass ===
- St. Nicholas Chapel (OCA-Dillingham)

=== King Cove ===
- St. Herman Church (OCA-Dillingham)

=== Sand Point ===
- St. Nicholas Church (OCA-Dillingham)

== Aleutians West Census Area ==
=== Atka ===
- St. Nicholas Chapel (OCA-Unalaska)

=== Nikolski ===
- St. Nicholas Church (OCA-Unalaska)

=== St. George Island ===
- St. George Church (OCA-Unalaska)

=== St. Paul Island ===
- SS. Peter and Paul Church (OCA-Unalaska)

=== Unalaska ===
- Holy Ascension of Our Lord Cathedral (OCA-Unalaska)

== Municipality of Anchorage ==
=== Anchorage ===
- Protecting Veil of the Theotokos Orthodox Community (OCA-Anchorage Deanery)
- St. Innocent Cathedral (OCA-Anchorage Deanery) - Rev. Thomas Rivas
- St. Tikhon of Moscow Mission (OCA-Anchorage Deanery) - Rev. Nicholas Cragle
- Holy Transfiguration Church (GOARCH) - Rev. Fr. Vasil Hillhouse

=== Eagle River ===
- St. John Cathedral (Antiochian) - Fr. Marc Dunaway

=== Eklutna Village / Chugiak ===
- St. Nicholas Church (OCA-Anchorage Deanery)

=== Wasilla/Palmer ===
- St. Juvenaly & his Companion Orthodox Church (OCA-Anchorage Deanery) - Rev. Simeon B. Johnson
- St. Herman Mission (Antiochian) - Fr. Matthew Howell

== Bristol Bay Borough ==
=== Naknek ===
- St. Anna the Mother of the Theotokos Church (OCA-Dillingham)

=== Portage Creek / Ohgsenakale ===
- St. Basil Church (OCA-Dillingham)

=== South Naknek ===
- Elevation of the Holy Cross Church (OCA-Dillingham)

== Bethel Census Area ==
=== Aniak ===
- Protection of the Theotokos Chapel (OCA-Russian Mission)

=== Atmartluaq / Aniak ===
- St. Herman of Alaska Chapel (OCA-Bethel)

=== Bethel ===
- St. Sophia Church (OCA-Bethel)

=== Chuathbaluk / Little Russian Mission ===
- St. Sergius Chapel (OCA-Anchorage)

=== Crooked Creek ===
- St. Nicholas Church (OCA-Russian Mission)

=== Eek ===
- St. Michael the Archangel Church (OCA-Bethel)

=== Kasigluk ===
- Holy Trinity Church (OCA-Bethel)

=== Kongiganak ===
- St. Gabriel Church (OCA-Bethel)

=== Kwethluk ===
- St. Nicholas Church (OCA-Bethel)

=== Kwigillingok ===
- St. Michael Church (OCA-Bethel)

=== Lower Kalskag ===
- St. Seraphim Chapel (OCA-Russian Mission)

=== Napaskiak ===
- St. James Church (OCA-Bethel)

=== Nunapitchuk ===
- Presentation of the Theotokos Chapel (OCA-Bethel)

=== Sleetmute ===
- SS. Peter and Paul Chapel (OCA-Russian Mission)

=== Stony River / Aniak ===
- St. Herman Chapel (OCA-Russian Mission)

=== Tuntutuliak ===
- St. Agaphia Church (OCA-Bethel)

== Dillingham Census Area ==
=== Aleknagik ===
- Holy Resurrection Chapel (OCA-Dillingham)

=== Clarks Point ===
- St. Innocent Enlightener of Alaska Mission (OCA-Dillingham)

=== Dillingham ===
- St. Seraphim of Sarov Church (OCA-Dillingham)

=== Ekuk and Dillingham ===
- St. Nicholas Chapel (OCA-Dillingham)

=== Ekwok ===
- St. John Chapel (OCA-Dillingham)

=== Koliganek ===
- St. Michael the Archangel Chapel (OCA-Dillingham)

=== New Stuyahok ===
- St. Sergius Church (OCA-Dillingham)

== Fairbanks North Star Borough ==
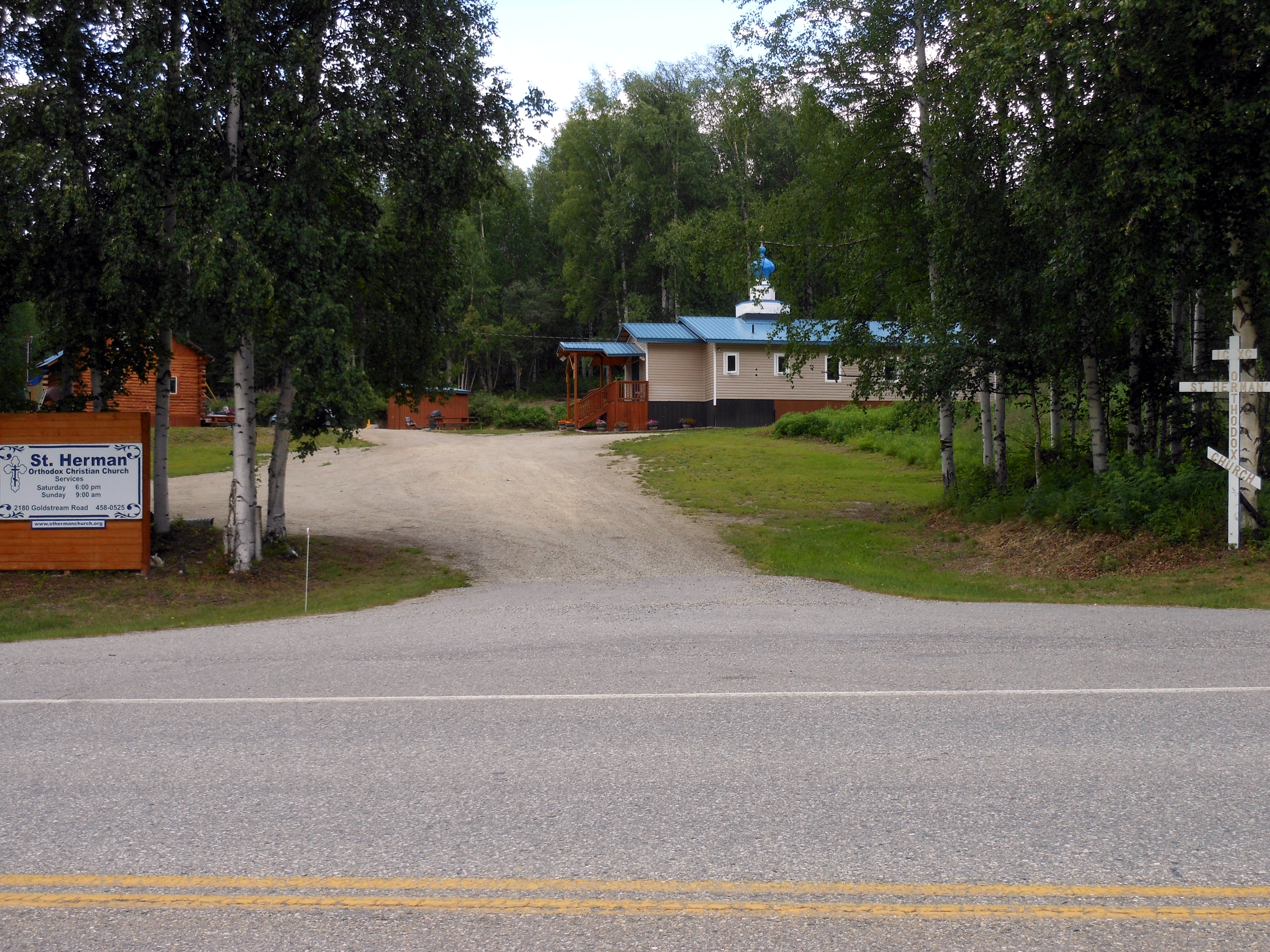
St. Herman Church.

=== Fairbanks ===
- St. Herman Church (OCA-Anchorage Deanery) - Rev. Andrew Wassillie

== Juneau City and Borough ==
=== Juneau ===
- St. Nicholas Russian Orthodox Church (OCA-Sitka) - Rev. Maxim Gibson
- Saint Sava Church (Abandoned after the collapse of the Treadwell Gold Mine in 1917. The congregation mostly moved to St. Nicholas Juneau or left Alaska. The temple burned in the 1926 fire.)

== Kenai Peninsula Borough ==
=== Homer ===
- Church of the Holy Transfiguration Old Rite Orthodox Church (ROCOR - Old Rite)
- All Saints of America Mission (Antiochian)
- St. Mary of Egypt Mission (OCA | Closed in May 2020)

=== Kenai ===
- Holy Assumption of the Virgin Mary Church (OCA-Kenai)

=== Nanwalek / English Bay ===
- Sts. Sergius and Herman of Valaam Church (OCA-Kenai)

=== Ninilchik ===
- Transfiguration of Our Lord Chapel (OCA-Kenai)

=== Port Graham / Paluwik ===
- St. Herman of Alaska Church (OCA-Kenai)

=== Seldovia ===
- St. Nicholas Church (OCA-Kenai)

=== Tyonek ===
- St. Nicholas Church (OCA-Kenai)

== Kodiak Island Borough ==
=== Akhiok ===
- Protection of the Theotokos Chapel (OCA-Kodiak)

=== Karluk ===
- Ascension of Our Lord Chapel (OCA-Kodiak)

=== Kodiak ===
- Holy Resurrection Cathedral (OCA-Kodiak) - Rev. Innocent Dresdow
- St. Nilus Island Skete, Kodiak Archipelago (Serbian Orthodox Eparchy of Western America)

=== Larsen Bay ===
- St. Herman Church (OCA-Kodiak)

=== Old Harbor ===
- Three Saints Church (OCA-Kodiak)

=== Ouzinkie ===
- Nativity of Our Lord Chapel (OCA-Kodiak)

=== Port Lions ===
- Nativity of the Theotokos Chapel (OCA-Kodiak)

=== Spruce Island / Ouzinkie ===
- SS. Sergius/Herman of Valaam Chapel (OCA)
- St. Archangel Michael Skete (Serbian Orthodox Eparchy of Western America)

== Kusilvak Census Area ==
=== Marshall ===
- St. Michael Church (OCA-Russian Mission)

=== Mountain Village ===
- St. Peter the Aleut Church (OCA-Russian Mission)

=== Ohagamiut ===
- St. Vladimir Chapel (OCA-Russian Mission)

=== Pilot Station ===
- Transfiguration of Our Lord Chapel (OCA-Russian Mission)

=== Pitka's Point ===
- SS. Peter and Paul Chapel (OCA-Russian Mission)

=== Russian Mission ===
- Elevation of the Holy Cross Church (OCA-Russian Mission)

== Lake and Peninsula Borough ==
=== Chignik Lagoon ===
- Chignik Lagoon Mission (OCA-Dillingham)

=== Chignik Lake ===
- St. Nicholas Church (OCA-Dillingham)

=== Egegik ===
- Transfiguration of Our Lord Chapel (OCA-Dillingham)

=== Iguigig / King Salmon ===
- St. Nicholas Chapel (OCA-Dillingham)

=== Kokhonak / Iliamna ===
- SS. Peter and Paul Church (OCA-Dillingham)

=== Levelock ===
- Protection of the Virgin Mary Church (OCA-Dillingham)

=== Newhalen / Iliamna ===
- Transfiguration of Our Lord Church (OCA-Dillingham)

=== Nondalton ===
- St. Nicholas Church (OCA-Dillingham)

=== Perryville ===
- St. John the Theologian Church (OCA-Dillingham)

=== Pilot Point ===
- St. Nicholas Church (OCA-Dillingham)

=== Port Heiden ===
- St. Matrona Church (OCA-Dillingham)

== Nome Census Area ==
=== St. Michael ===
- Orthodox Community (OCA-Russian Mission)

== Sitka City and Borough ==
=== Sitka ===
- Annunciation of the Theotokos Chapel (OCA-Sitka)
- St. Michael the Archangel Cathedral (OCA-Sitka)

== Skagway-Hoonah-Angoon Census Area ==
=== Angoon ===
- St. John the Baptist Church (OCA-Sitka)

=== Hoonah ===
- St. Nicholas Russian Orthodox Church (OCA-Sitka)

== Valdez-Cordova Census Area ==
=== Chenega Bay ===
- Nativity of the Theotokos Church (OCA-Kenai)

=== Cordova ===
- St. Michael the Archangel Church (OCA-Kenai)

=== Tatitlek ===
- St. Nicholas Church (OCA-Kenai)

=== Valdez ===
- St. Nicholas Orthodox Community (OCA-Kenai)

== Yukon-Koyukuk Census Area ==
=== Lime Village / McGrath ===
- SS. Constantine and Helen Chapel (OCA-Kenai)

=== Nikolai ===
- St. Nicholas Chapel (OCA-Anchorage)

=== Telida ===
- St. Basil Chapel (OCA-Anchorage)
