= St. Archangel Michael Skete =

Serbian Orthodox monastery on Sprice Island, Alaska

St. Archangel Michael Skete is an Eastern Orthodox Christian monastery on Spruce Island, Alaska. It is three miles away from Monk's Lagoon, where Saint Herman of Alaska lived 200 years ago. He was venerated by local inhabitants as a saint long before his formal glorification by the Church. St. Archangel Michael Skete is under the omophorion of Bishop Maksim of the Serbian Orthodox Eparchy of Western America of the Serbian Orthodox Church.

Kodiak Island is the place where the first Russian monastery on the North American continent was first erected in 1794 while still part of Imperial Russia. In 1808, Herman of Alaska established his hermitage on Spruce Island. Today, the North American saint's original dwelling is preserved by the monastics of St. Archangel Michael Skete, who are located in Sunny Cove on Spruce Island.

The Orthodox monks on Spruce Island are isolated from the mainland, as are the Orthodox nuns on St. Nilus Skete, which is half a mile away. The primary means of transportation for the monks living in isolation from the mainland communities (since 1983) is a small aluminum skiff named the "Archangel". The handful of monks use their boat to go off to sea to fish. In the summer, the monks help pilgrims by taking them with their skiff to Monk's Lagoon and St. Nilus Island Skete.

== See also ==
- St. Nilus Skete
- Saint Herman of Alaska Monastery
- Saint Paisius Serbian Orthodox Monastery
- Saint Xenia Serbian Orthodox Monastery
- List of Serbian Orthodox monasteries
- List of Eastern Orthodox monasteries in the United States
