= Saint Xenia Serbian Orthodox Monastery =

Serbian Orthodox monastery in Wildwood, California

Coordinates: 40.380751°N 123.026736°W

Saint Xenia Serbian Orthodox Monastery (Serbian: Српски православни манастир Свете Ксеније, romanized: Srpski pravoslavni manastir Svete Ksenije) is an Eastern Orthodox Christian women's monastic community located in Wildwood, California. It was founded in 1980 and is under the omophorion of Bishop Maksim of the Serbian Orthodox Eparchy of Western America of the Serbian Orthodox Church. It is affiliated with the Saint Herman of Alaska Monastery in Platina, California.

The daily life of the nuns revolves around common and private prayers and work such as growing vegetables and flowers, hosting pilgrims and giving them tours of the monastery, making prayer ropes, and so on. In cooperation with Saint Herman Press, Saint Xenia sisterhood is also involved in publishing Orthodox works and other written material related to Eastern Orthodoxy and adherence to the Nicene Creed.

== See also ==
- Serbian Orthodox Church in North and South America
- List of Serbian Orthodox monasteries
- List of Eastern Orthodox monasteries in the United States
