= Holy Ascension Serbian Orthodox Monastery =

Serbian Orthodox monastery in Youngwood, Pennsylvania

Coordinates: 40.2413°N 79.5767°W

Holy Ascension Serbian Orthodox Monastery (Serbian: Српски православни манастир Вазнесења Христовог, romanized: Srpski pravoslavni manastir Vaznesenja Hristovog) is an Eastern Orthodox Christian monastery located in Youngwood, Pennsylvania. It is under the omophorion of Bishop Irinej of the Serbian Orthodox Eparchy of Eastern America of the Serbian Orthodox Church.

The early Serbian immigrants, like other European newcomers, were part of the workforce of the Pennsylvania Railroad. A few families did settle in the borough of Youngstown that offered new opportunities. With the ensuing wars in Eastern Europe in the first half of the 20th century, the later wave of immigrants decided to establish permanent institutions, such as a church and a monastery. The Holy Ascension Monastery was built in 1912, one of the oldest in North America. It originally cost $262.88 to build, including the parish house for the priest. The church was renovated in the early 1960s. The centenary was celebrated at the church in 2012.

== See also ==
- Serbian Orthodox Church in North and South America
- List of Serbian Orthodox monasteries
- List of Eastern Orthodox monasteries in the United States
