= Serbian Orthodox Eparchy of Western America =

Diocese of the Serbian Orthodox Church

Location
- Territory: Western United States and Mexico
- Headquarters: Alhambra, California

Information
- Denomination: Eastern Orthodox
- Sui iuris church: Serbian Orthodox Church
- Established: 1963
- Cathedral: Saint Steven Cathedral, Alhambra, California
- Language: Church Slavonic, Serbian, English

Current leadership
- Bishop: Maksim Vasiljević

Map

Website
- Serbian Orthodox Eparchy of Western America

The Serbian Orthodox Eparchy of Western America (Serbian: Српска православна епархија западноамеричка, romanized: Srpska pravoslavna eparhija zapadnoamerička) is a diocese (eparchy) of the Serbian Orthodox Church, covering the western region of the United States and Mexico. The stated primary mission of the diocese is to preserve and foster the faith and religious values of the Serbian Orthodox Church, as well as to provide spiritual guidance in almost fifty churches, monasteries, and children's summer camps.

== Structure ==
The Serbian Orthodox Eparchy of Western America comprises 35 parishes: 18 in California; 3 each in Arizona, Oregon, and Alaska; two each in Colorado and Nevada; and one each in Washington, Idaho, Utah, and Montana. The episcopal see is located at Saint Steven Cathedral in Alhambra, California.

Monasteries under the jurisdiction of a diocese include:

- Saint Xenia Serbian Orthodox Monastery (Wildwood, California)
- Saint Paisius Serbian Orthodox Monastery (Safford, Arizona)
- Saint Herman of Alaska Monastery (Platina, California)
- Holy Encounter Serbian Orthodox Monastery (Escondido, California)
- Holy Resurrection Serbian Orthodox Monastery (Fallbrook, California)
- St. Nilus Skete (Ouzinkie, Alaska)
- St. Archangel Michael Skete (Spruce Island, Alaska)

== Gallery ==
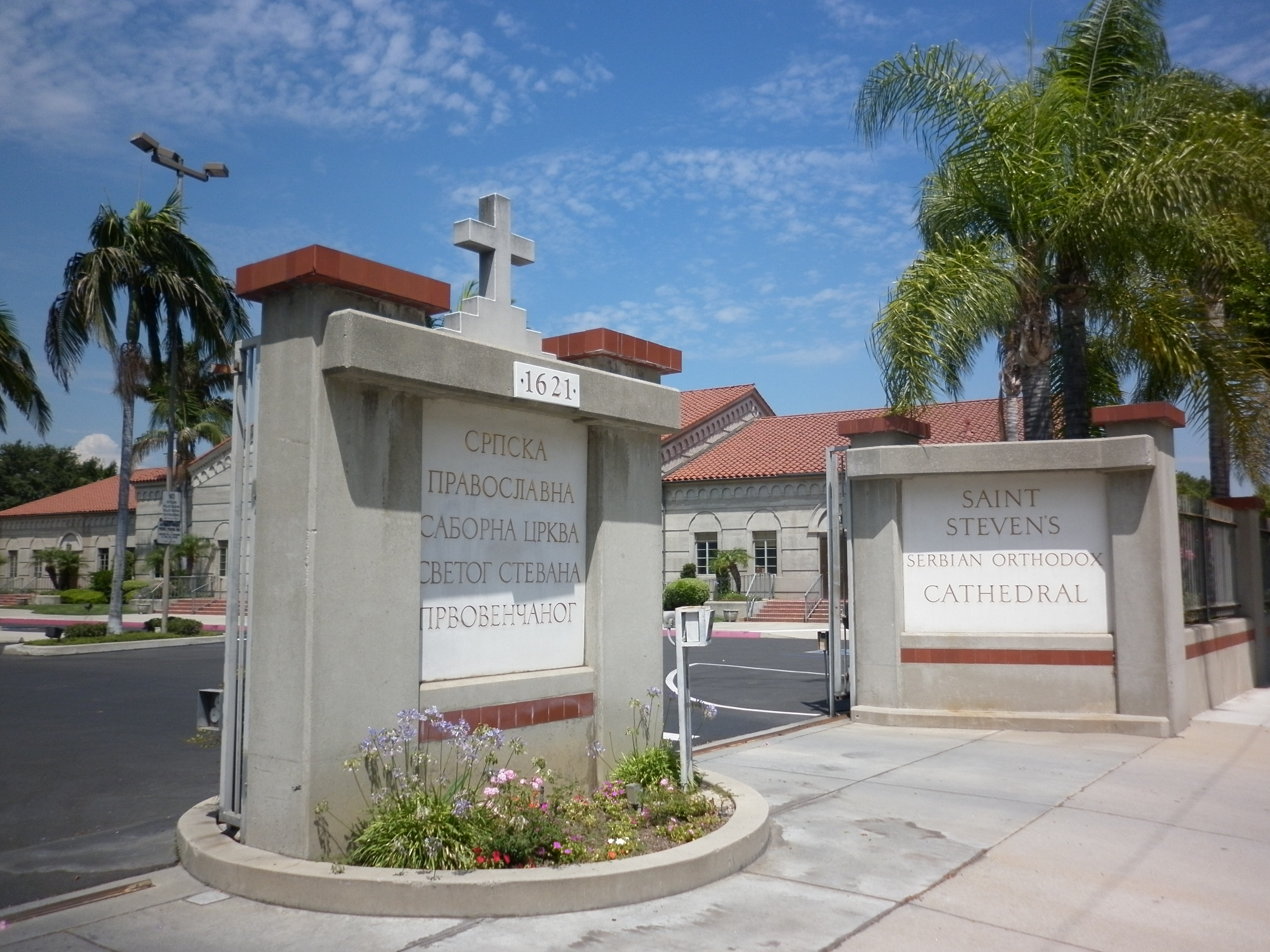
Entrance to Saint Steven Cathedral (Alhambra, California)

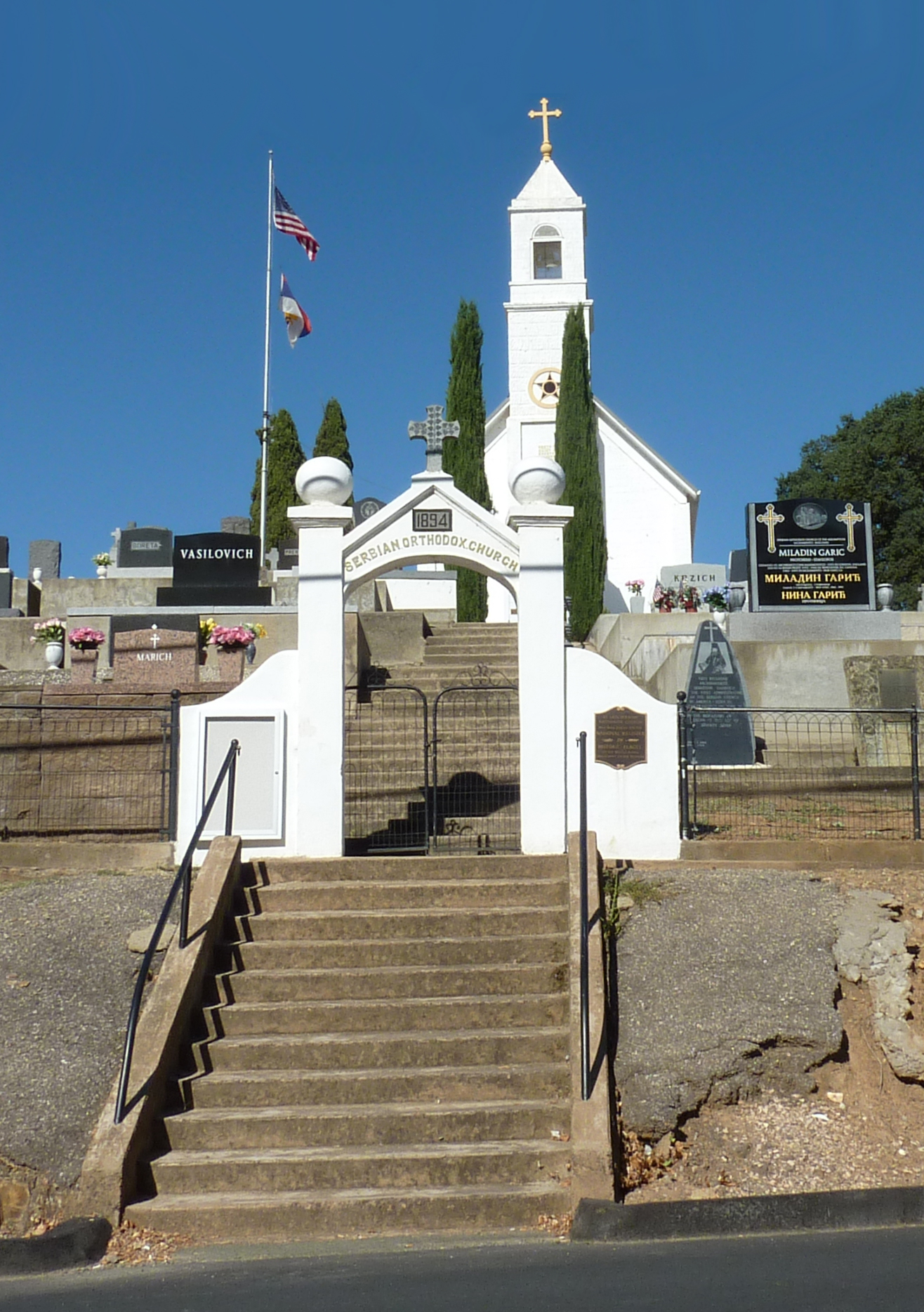
Saint Sava Church (Jackson, California)

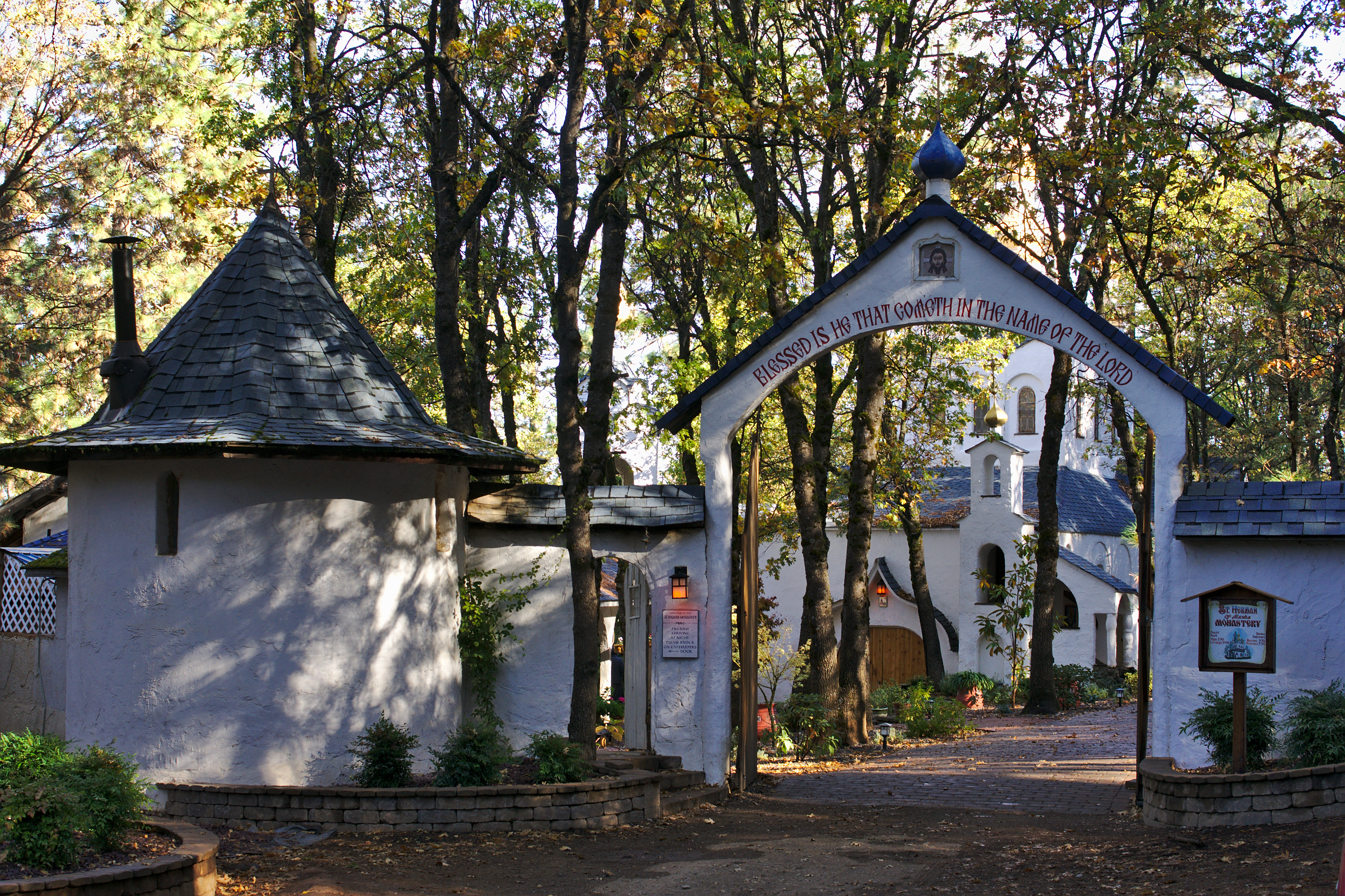
Saint Herman of Alaska Monastery (Platina, California)

== See also ==
- Serbian Orthodox Church in North and South America
- Eparchies and metropolitanates of the Serbian Orthodox Church
- Serbian Americans

== Sources ==
- Vuković, Sava (1998). History of the Serbian Orthodox Church in America and Canada 1891–1941. Kragujevac: Kalenić.
