= Cooperativa Hidroeléctrica de la Montaña =

First electric services cooperative in Puerto Rico

- Formation: 2019
- Type: Electric services cooperative
- Purpose: Non-profit organization with the purpose of providing access to renewable and resilient energy for residents, communities and businesses in the municipalities of Adjuntas, Jayuya, Lares, Maricao and Utuado, among others.
- Headquarters: Puerto Rico
- Website: https://cooperativahidroelectrica.coop/

The Cooperativa Hidroeléctrica de la Montaña is the first electric energy cooperative in Puerto Rico. Their purpose is to generate and distribute cost effective and resilient energy from renewable sources for the communities and businesses from the Adjuntas, Jayuya, Lares, Maricao and Utuado municipalities. The efforts of the Cooperativa Hidroeléctrica de la Montaña aim to guarantee cost-effective, clean, and resilient energy for the residents of these communities using a democratic model.

== Corporate Establishment ==
The alternative of organizing and promoting the Cooperativa Hidroeléctrica de la Montaña arises from the leadership of Unidos por Utuado Inc., which organized volunteers who went out to fight for their communities. The leaders of Unidos por Utuado Inc. witnessed the vulnerability of the Cordillera Central community, who were forced to wait up to a year to have electricity service restored.

Due to the need in the town, and with the commitment to serve the residents of the Cordillera Central, the leaders began to elaborate this idea of creating the first electrical cooperative in Puerto Rico. This cooperative would provide the towns of central Puerto Rico with cost-effective, stable, and resilient electricity and serve as a driver of economic development, opening opportunities for communities to participate in the transformation of the energy system through the cooperative model. The concept of the electric cooperative is based on recovering the operation of the hydroelectric plants of Lake Dos Bocas and Caonillas.

== History ==
December 2018

This law makes the development of the Cooperativa Hidroeléctrica de la Montaña possible as an electric energy cooperative instead of a mixed cooperative that was already being formed.

April 2019

The Authority for Public-Private Partnerships issues a Request for Qualifications for the Puerto Rico Hydroelectric Power Plants Revitalization Project (RFQ 2019-2) that offers a concession to rehabilitate and manage all hydroelectric plants in Puerto Rico.

July 2019

The Cooperativa Hidroeléctrica de la Montaña celebrates the delivery of the declaration of qualifications to the Authority for Public-Private Partnerships (AAPP) to operate the plants located in the Dos Bocas and Caonillas lakes in Utuado.

August 2019

The Cooperativa Hidroeléctrica de la Montaña is incorporated with the Department of State, becoming the first Electric Power Cooperative in Puerto Rico.

October 2019

The organization Unidos por Utuado denounces that the Cooperativa Hidroeléctrica de la Montaña is paralyzed by the bureaucracy of the Public-Private Partnerships Authority and threatens the project that would bring renewable energy to Utuado, Adjuntas and Jayuya.

June 2020

The Cooperativa Hidroeléctrica de la Montaña is selected with special recognition for the best renewable energy project and its commitment to citizenship by the Puerto Rico Chamber of Commerce.

December 2020

The United States Internal Revenue Service (IRS) designated the Cooperativa Hidroeléctrica de la Montaña as a tax-exempt non-profit organization, making it the first organization in Puerto Rico to receive a 501(c)(12) designation.

May 2022

The Cooperativa Hidroeléctrica de la Montaña wins the Inclusive Energy Innovation Award.

As part of the ReEnFoCo project, the Cooperativa Hidroeléctrica de la Montaña inaugurated the first microgrid in Poblado Castañer through the installation of a photovoltaic system.

June 2022

The Microrred de la Montaña is one of 12 projects in remote communities that were selected for the Department of Energy's Energy Transitions Initiative Partnership Project (ETIPP).

== Projects ==
The Cooperativa Hidroeléctrica de la Montaña has three projects.

=== Hidroenergía Renace ===
Hidroenergía Renace consists of the acquisition, rehabilitation and management of the Caonillas and Dos Bocas hydroelectric plants. Puerto Rico's hydroelectric system operates well below its capacity due to a historical problem of lack of maintenance, which was aggravated by damage from the Hurricanes Irma and María. The Mountain Hydroelectric Cooperative proposes the rescue of the Dos Bocas and Caonillas plants to provide the mountain with 43 megawatts of reliable and renewable energy.

=== ReEnFoCo ===
The project Reenfoco has the objective of installing photovoltaic systems in remote areas through a contribution from the Interstate Renewable Energy Council. This project aims to improve the lives of residents in the region with a first phase, which represents the installation of photovoltaic systems for businesses, community centers and residences located at strategic intersections. Each installed photovoltaic system will create Resilience Centers so that the community has access to electricity during periods of grid failure.

=== Microrred de la Montaña ===
The project Microrred de la Montaña seeks to be the first intermunicipal microgrid in Puerto Rico. According to its promoters, the project will combine hydroelectric and photovoltaic power generation to supply new 38-kilovolt lines between the towns of Adjuntas, Jayuya, Lares, and Utuado.

The project would help the cooperative provide resilient and affordable power to residents. of four remote inland mountain communities. It is one of 12 projects in remote and island communities that were competitively selected to strengthen energy infrastructure and reduce the risk of outages. The project seeks to ensure that residents have essential services in what the community manages to replenish after a disaster or any situation.

== Grants and Awards ==
CPAP (Grant) (DoE) The Cooperativa Hidroeléctrica de la Montaña was one of the winners of the "Community Power Accelerator Prize" (CPAP) designed by the U.S. Department of Energy (DoE). The aim is to expand the ecosystem of community solar project developers seeking to integrate these innovative projects and their benefits across the United States. CPAP promotes learning, participation, and the expansion of operators, which is why, in addition to monetary aid, winners of this prize receive education aimed at supporting these successful projects.

IEIP (Grant) (DoE) The Cooperativa Hidroeléctrica de la Montaña was selected as one of the winners of the "Inclusive Energy Innovation Prize" (IEIP), designed by the Department of Energy (DoE) in conjunction with the Office of Energy Efficiency and Renewable Energy (EERE) and the Office of Economic Impact and Diversity (ED). This prize was created to support groups working towards energy justice, including entrepreneurs, community organizers, academic institutions, and non-profit organizations. The Cooperativa Hidroeléctrica de la Montaña will use these resources to create load designs that will become our next microgrids.

ETIPP (Technical Assistance) (DoE) The Energy Transitions Initiative Partnership Project (ETIPP) connects communities with energy experts for the training, development, and expansion of resilient energy systems. ETIPP includes a broad network of experts, including the U.S. Department of Energy (DoE), national laboratories, and regional organizations that provide technical assistance and support to these innovative energy projects. The Cooperativa Hidroeléctrica de la Montaña receives this technical assistance in creating a map that will help identify the location of each microgrid based on its vulnerability. This includes critical municipal services, which will be considered when creating the microgrids.

CEIF (Technical Assistance) (DoE) The U.S. Department of Energy (DoE) has a scholarship program that funds recent graduates and energy professionals. The Clean Energy Innovator Program (CEIF) aims to boost professional opportunities in the energy field, creating a national transformation toward resilient and affordable energy. Currently, the Cooperativa Hidroeléctrica de la Montaña has two fellows who support the organization while receiving mentorship.

SDGG (Technical Assistance Grant) (USDA) The Socially Disadvantaged Groups Grant (SDGG) program primarily aims to provide technical assistance to socially disadvantaged groups through cooperatives. The Cooperativa Hidroeléctrica de la Montaña will work with experts in electric cooperative operations and training to create 17 operational manuals in Spanish, serving as technical assistance for both emerging and existing cooperatives aiming to empower their members. This technical assistance project will benefit the Spanish-speaking population who, for many years, have struggled with the language barrier and thus have not been able to access energy manuals written in English.

RACER (Technical Assistance) (DoE) The Solar Energy Technologies Office (SETO) of the U.S. Department of Energy (DOE) announced the Renewable Energy for the Community Energy Resilience (RACER) project, which will provide $25 million in funding for projects to prevent energy disruptions caused by external climatic conditions and other events, and to rapidly restore electricity.

The RACER program aims to develop an innovative energy resilience plan based in the Castañer community to develop and demonstrate an automated detection and control system based on the VOLTTRON tool, which will allow rapid energy restoration. This resilience plan will identify the most critical assets and services for the community during various types of emergencies that cause power outages. The objective of this project is to improve the energy resilience of the Castañer community in Puerto Rico.

Communities LEAP (Technical Assistance) (DoE) The Department of Energy selects the Cooperativa Hidroeléctrica de la Montaña to participate in the second cohort of the Local Energy Action Program for Communities (Communities LEAP). This initiative aims to facilitate the sustained economic empowerment of the entire community through clean energy, improving local environmental conditions, and paving the way for other benefits, primarily through DOE's clean energy deployment work.
