= Holy Ascension Monastery =

Eastern Orthodox Monastery in Bearsville, New York

Coordinates: 42°1′3″N 74°14′37″W

Holy Ascension Monastery is a male monastic community located in Bearsville, New York under the auspices of the Church of the Genuine Orthodox Christians of America (GOC). It is under the omophorion of Metropolitan Demetrius of America.

== History ==
The monastery was founded in 1999 by Metropolitan Pavlos.

== Life ==
The monastery follows a cenobitic typikon. The divine liturgy is celebrated four times per week (Tuesday, Thursday, Saturday and Sunday) as well as on major feast days. Each day that liturgy is celebrated, except Sunday, begins with the Midnight office at 4:15 followed by Matins (Orthos) and Divine liturgy. On days no liturgy is celebrated midnight office begins at 4:45 followed by Matins and the Typica service. The music used is Traditional Byzantine chant and the services are approximately two-thirds English and one-third Greek. Occasionally Church Slavonic and znamenny chant are used as well. At noon the paraclesis to the Mother of God is read each day with optional attendance for the monastics due to the necessity of certain obediences. Each day at 6:30 there is the service of Vespers and compline with the Akathist to the mother of God. At the end of each day all the monks ask forgiveness from the abbot and retire to their cells. From the end of Compline until breakfast the following day there is a strict observance of quiet hours. No talking is permitted without a blessing of the abbot.

There are two meals each day at the Monastery. The meals provided follow the tradition of the Orthodox church regarding fasting. At 9:00 a.m. there is a light breakfast and at 3:00 p.m. there is the main meal of the day. Snacking is not permitted without a blessing of the Abbot.

A wide variety of obediences are done each day at the monastery: candle-making, construction work, kitchen work, iconography, prayer rope making, music practice, etc. Although the monastery gladly accepts donations for its construction work, the monks live by the work of their hands and the monastery is primarily supported through beeswax candles, which are hand-dipped and sold to churches. The monks begins their obediences after the morning meal and work up until 5:30. On feast days, a vigil is held from approximately 8:00 p.m. to 2:00 a.m. and there is no work during the day without a blessing. On days of vigils and on Sundays the trapeza (meal) is in the late morning (11 a.m.) and the evening meal is at 5:00 p.m.

Most importantly, the monastery is a spiritual hospital and the spiritual fathers are always available for confession and revelation of thoughts.

== Hagia Sophia ==
During the Feast of the Ascension on June 2, 2011, five bishops and four priests blessed the foundations for a new church on a hill at the monastery. The church had been planned as a 1/5 scale replica of the original Hagia Sophia in Constantinople, modern day Turkey. The skeleton of the church was to be made of autoclaved aerated concrete block units, with the exterior faced with limestone and Byzantine brick, and the interior with marble revetment and marble columns with capitals copied from the original designs. The church was to be illuminated by over 60 custom-made windows.

The church was designed by William Hall of Hall III Design and built by Mark Arrow, a stonemason who also built St. Maximus Orthodox Church in Owe, New York. The fathers of the monastery also took an active part in the designing and building of the church.

Construction of the foundation was begun in the late autumn of 2011 and completed in the spring of 2012. By the summer of 2013, the walls had reached 7 feet high.

In 2017, it was reported that the half completed Hagia Sophia replica was demolished following delays in construction and the discovery of structural damage in the vaulting.
