= Saint Paisius Serbian Orthodox Monastery =

Serbian Orthodox monastery in Safford, Arizona

Coordinates: 32.6993°N 109.6782°W

Saint Paisius Serbian Orthodox Monastery (Serbian: Српски православни манастир Светог Пајсија, romanized: Srpski pravoslavni manastir Svetog Pajsija) is an Eastern Orthodox Christian women's cenobitic monastic community near Safford, Arizona, in the Sonoran Desert at the base of Mount Graham. Monastery is under omophorion of Bishop Maksim of the Serbian Orthodox Eparchy of Western America of the Serbian Orthodox Church. The monastery is now also under the jurisdictions of Bishop Kyrill of the Western American Diocese of the Russian Orthodox Church Outside of Russia. It has 320 acres (130 ha) of land, making it the fifth largest monastery among the 80 American Orthodox Christian monasteries.

== History ==
The monastery was founded in 1993 and is dedicated to Saint Paisius Velichkovsky, who dedicated his life to collecting and translating the texts of the Philokalia as a means of preserving the teachings of the Holy Fathers on the hesychastic way of life.

Since 1995, the sisterhood has welcomed teenage girls who wish to live and study at the monastery. The monastery home school is dedicated to the Protection of the Theotokos. The sisters tutor the girls in their studies and offer supplementary classes. Some of the students have chosen to remain as nuns in the monastery, while others have married and started their own families.

An Orthodox cemetery was established in 2004.

== Monastic life ==
The sisterhood is composed of about twenty sisters. There is a daily Divine Liturgy in the monastery, and the daily cycle of services is conducted primarily in English.

To support themselves, the sisters publish spiritual texts, make prayer ropes, and offer to over 1000 guests who visit the monastery each year a fully stocked bookstore. They also labor in cultivating the earth and tending the monastery's flock of purebred milk goats and other animals in order to be as self-sufficient as possible.

== See also ==
- Serbian Orthodox Church in North and South America
- List of Serbian Orthodox monasteries
- List of Eastern Orthodox monasteries in the United States
