= Energy Technology Innovation Partnership Project =

The Energy Transitions Initiative Partnership Project (ETIPP) is a project under the United States Department of Energy to provide federal aid to remote communities in the United States for improving their electric infrastructure, energy costs, and resiliency during natural disasters and outages.

The project announced the first 11 participating communities in April 2021, with a new round of applications planned for the fall of 2021. The communities partner with regional agencies, which help them identify needs and connect them to the National Renewable Energy Laboratory, Pacific Northwest National Laboratory, Sandia National Laboratories, and Lawrence Berkeley National Laboratory. These laboratories will assist the communities for 12–18 months. The regional agencies share local needs to the national partners and ensure that the communities lead the decisions. Senators Susan Collins (Maine), Angus King (Maine), Brian Schatz (Hawaii), Mazie Hirono (Hawaii) praised the project.

Previous Department of Energy projects funded microgrids (decentralized energy networks) in post-Hurricane Katrina New Orleans and trained Hawaii utilities officials on how to increase renewable energy capacity.

== Selected communities ==
The 2021 first round of selected communities and potential plans include:

- Sitka, Alaska – to develop a hybrid fuel for or electrifying the fishing fleet of the Alaska Longline Fishermen's Association to move away from diesel fuel imports, which cost most of the fishers’ income to buy; to modernize their electric grid control system and increase renewable energy generation by analyzing available nearby resources
- Dillingham, Alaska – to investigate hydroelectric power through the Nuyakuk River Hydroelectric Project as a cheaper alternative to fossil fuels shipped via barges
- Ouzinkie, Alaska – to improve on the current use of diesel generators and an aged hydroelectric power source; to improve energy storage and renewable sourcing
- Wainwright, Alaska – to decrease the community's 100% reliance on diesel, increase energy efficiency and renewable power, and increase resilience
- Eastport, Maine – to investigate potential tidal power and microgrid potential
- Islesboro, Maine – to increase the community's energy efficiency, renewable energy potential, and energy storage, and to improve self-sufficiency in municipal and residential structures instead of depending on the mainland for resources
- Honolulu, Hawaii – to develop a microgrid map to increase resilience to extreme weather
- Kauai, Hawaii – to "explore alternative and autonomous mobility options for its residents and tourists to move away from fossil-fuel powered single occupancy vehicles and toward a modern, clean transportation system"
- Nags Head, North Carolina – to secure 48–72 hours of backup energy for emergency services due to the community's vulnerability to severe weather and rising sea levels; to investigate renewable and energy efficiency options
- Ocracoke Island, North Carolina – to "analyze the additional grid infrastructure needs" to allow the community to electrify its ferry fleet, which residents require for transport to the mainland

=== 2022 ===
In June 2022, the Department of Energy announced another 12 communities/organizations that would receive grants:

- Aquinnah and Chilmark, Massachusetts (located on the island of Martha's Vineyard) – to use 100% renewable energy by 2040 and reduce emissions by retrofitting municipal buildings, using microgrids, and updating efficiency/distribution solutions
- Bainbridge Island, Washington (a commuter island by Seattle) – to analyze solar/water power options with a goal of 100% renewable energy by 2040; possible solutions include community solar and residential-level batteries
- Beaver Island, Michigan – to improve energy costs and find local opportunities for renewable energy production and storage in a location where the economy has historically been driven by fossil fuels
- Guam Power Authority, Guam – to improve utility planning, energy security, and renewable energy resource integration; to add a performance management system for existing renewable energy plans to have 50% renewables by 2035 and 100% by 2045
- Hui o Hau'ula, Hawaii (a community organization in Oahu) – to analyze energy needs and technologies for a Community Resilience Hub, which will generate and store power for the surrounding area; to develop storm and disaster energy plans
- Igiugig, Alaska – to analyze the effects of increased renewable energy on distribution, efficiency, and conservation; to increase community engagement, communication, and self-sufficiency
- Makah Tribe, Washington – to integrate renewable energy into critical infrastructure planning, increase self-sufficiency, and increase community engagement and perspective
- McGrath, Alaska – to increase energy self-sufficiency, resilience, and capacity with consideration to local economic opportunities; to decrease energy costs
- Microgrid of the Mountain, Puerto Rico (hydroelectric cooperative) – to refine and review its existing microgrid plan and improve batteries and distribution across four remote mountain communities
- Mount Desert Island, Maine – to examine best approaches to transition into renewable energy and further decarbonization, including microgrid viability; to find pathways to 100% renewable energy by 2030
- Nikolski and St. George, Alaska – to appraise existing wind turbines and reconfigure them; to reduce reliance on expensive diesel imports by training local staff and examining where battery storage may occur
- University of Hawaii, Hawaii – to analyze geothermal cooling potential across the university system's campuses
