= St. Sabbas Russian Orthodox Monastery (Harper Woods, Michigan) =

Russian Orthodox monastery in Harper Woods, Michigan

Coordinates: 42.4414°N 82.9443°W

St. Sabbas Orthodox Monastery is a male monastery of the Russian Orthodox Church Outside Russia, located in Harper Woods, Michigan.

St. Sabbas Monastery was founded in 1999 under Archimandrite Pachomy (Belkoff). St. Sabbas is directly under Metropolitan Nicholas Nicholas Olhovsky of the Russian Orthodox Church Abroad and under Kyrill.

The monastery is in Southeast Michigan on over 6 acres of land with a small but growing community of monastics. The monastery follows the patristic Julian calendar.

The monastery hosts a restaurant, Royal Eagle, which serves as its primary source of funding.

== History ==
St. Sabbas Orthodox Monastery was founded in 1999 by Father Pachomy (John Belkoff), a Detroit native. The monastery was created in response to the decline of the All Saints Russian Orthodox Cathedral in Detroit, that had fallen into disrepair and an influx of Russian immigrants to the area after the fall of the Soviet Union.

The monastery started with a single house, and expanded by gradually purchasing and remodeling surrounding residential homes.

== Architecture ==
The monastery was constructed by purchasing and remodeling residential homes, blending old and new structures to comply with local building codes, resulting in a unique mix of residential and ecclesiastical architecture.

The monastery is characterized by its Russian-inspired architecture, including onion domes, mosaics, and religious iconography. The grounds hold a large garden with a koi pond, the Royal Eagle restaurant, and a reliquary.
