= Ouzinkie, Alaska =

City in Alaska, United States

Ouzinkie Uusenkaaq, Узинки
- City
- Location in Alaska
- Coordinates: 57°55′24″N 152°30′07″W
- Country: United States
- State: Alaska
- Borough: Kodiak Island
- Incorporated: October 23, 1967

Government
  - Mayor: Elijah M. Jackson.
  - State senator: Gary Stevens (R)
  - State rep.: Louise Stutes (R)

Area
  - Total: 7.03 sq mi (18.22 km^{2})
  - Land: 5.54 sq mi (14.34 km^{2})
  - Water: 1.50 sq mi (3.88 km^{2})
- Elevation: 43 ft (13 m)

Population (2020)
  - Total: 109
  - Density: 20/sq mi (7.6/km^{2})
- Time zone: UTC-9 (Alaska (AKST))
  - Summer (DST): UTC-8 (AKDT)
- ZIP code: 99615
- Area code: 907
- FIPS code: 02-58550
- GNIS feature ID: 1407684

Ouzinkie (/juːˈzɪŋki/, Uusenkaaq in Alutiiq, Russian: Узинки) is a hamlet on Spruce Island in Kodiak Island Borough, Alaska, United States. As of the 2020 census, Ouzinkie had a population of 109.

== Geography ==
Ouzinkie is located at 57°55′24″N 152°30′07″W (57.923, -152.502).

According to the United States Census Bureau, the hamlet has a total area of 7.7 square miles (20 km^{2}), of which 6.0 square miles (16 km^{2}) is land and 1.6 square miles (4.1 km^{2}) (21.48%) is water.

=== Climate ===
Climate data for Ouzinkie, Alaska
Month	Jan	Feb	Mar	Apr	May	Jun	Jul	Aug	Sep	Oct	Nov	Dec	Year
Record high °F (°C)	48 (9)	45 (7)	52 (11)	62 (17)	74 (23)	77 (25)	82 (28)	77 (25)	70 (21)	59 (15)	53 (12)	49 (9)	82 (28)
Mean daily maximum °F (°C)	34.2 (1.2)	34.8 (1.6)	37.5 (3.1)	42.7 (5.9)	50.2 (10.1)	55.6 (13.1)	60.1 (15.6)	61.3 (16.3)	54.7 (12.6)	45.1 (7.3)	38.1 (3.4)	35.0 (1.7)	45.8 (7.7)
Daily mean °F (°C)	30.1 (−1.1)	30.5 (−0.8)	31.9 (−0.1)	37.4 (3.0)	43.7 (6.5)	49.4 (9.7)	54.2 (12.3)	54.8 (12.7)	48.7 (9.3)	39.9 (4.4)	33.7 (0.9)	30.6 (−0.8)	40.4 (4.7)
Mean daily minimum °F (°C)	25.9 (−3.4)	26.2 (−3.2)	26.3 (−3.2)	32.0 (0.0)	37.2 (2.9)	43.2 (6.2)	48.2 (9.0)	48.2 (9.0)	42.6 (5.9)	34.6 (1.4)	29.3 (−1.5)	26.1 (−3.3)	35.0 (1.7)
Record low °F (°C)	−4 (−20)	−4 (−20)	3 (−16)	9 (−13)	23 (−5)	34 (1)	41 (5)	35 (2)	26 (−3)	17 (−8)	10 (−12)	5 (−15)	−4 (−20)
Average precipitation inches (mm)	8.74 (222)	6.33 (161)	5.01 (127)	7.75 (197)	5.53 (140)	5.91 (150)	4.91 (125)	5.28 (134)	7.13 (181)	7.96 (202)	6.97 (177)	8.93 (227)	80.45 (2,043)
Average snowfall inches (cm)	11.6 (29)	9.9 (25)	6.9 (18)	2.1 (5.3)	0.1 (0.25)	0.0 (0.0)	0.0 (0.0)	0.0 (0.0)	0.0 (0.0)	0.1 (0.25)	5.3 (13)	10.6 (27)	46.6 (117.8)
Source: WRCC

== Demographics ==
Historical population
Census	Pop.	Note	%±
1880	45		—
1890	74		64.4%
1920	96		—
1930	168		75.0%
1940	253		50.6%
1950	177		−30.0%
1960	214		20.9%
1970	160		−25.2%
1980	173		8.1%
1990	209		20.8%
2000	225		7.7%
2010	161		−28.4%
2020	109		−32.3%
U.S. Decennial Census

Ouzinkie first appeared on the 1880 U.S. Census as the unincorporated village of "Oozinkie." All 45 of its residents were Creole (Mixed Russian and Alaskan Native). In 1890, it reported as "Uzinkee" and included Yelovoi Village. All 74 residents were Creole. It did not appear again until 1920 when it reported as "Ouzinkee." In 1950, the name was changed to "Uzinki." In 1967, it was incorporated as Ouzinkie, and has returned under that name in every census since 1970.

=== 2020 census ===
As of the 2020 census, Ouzinkie had a population of 109. The median age was 54.9 years. 9.2% of residents were under the age of 18 and 27.5% of residents were 65 years of age or older. For every 100 females there were 91.2 males, and for every 100 females age 18 and over there were 86.8 males age 18 and over.

0.0% of residents lived in urban areas, while 100.0% lived in rural areas.

There were 45 households in Ouzinkie, of which 15.6% had children under the age of 18 living in them. Of all households, 33.3% were married-couple households, 35.6% were households with a male householder and no spouse or partner present, and 26.7% were households with a female householder and no spouse or partner present. About 35.6% of all households were made up of individuals and 2.2% had someone living alone who was 65 years of age or older.

There were 81 housing units, of which 44.4% were vacant. The homeowner vacancy rate was 6.7% and the rental vacancy rate was 63.2%.

Racial composition as of the 2020 census
Race	Number	Percent
White	22	20.2%
Black or African American	0	0.0%
American Indian and Alaska Native	78	71.6%
Asian	2	1.8%
Native Hawaiian and Other Pacific Islander	0	0.0%
Some other race	0	0.0%
Two or more races	7	6.4%
Hispanic or Latino (of any race)	3	2.8%

=== 2000 census ===
As of the census of 2000, there were 225 people, 74 households, and 56 families residing in the hamlet. The population density was 37.3 inhabitants per square mile (14.4/km^{2}). There were 86 housing units at an average density of 14.3 units per square mile (5.5 units/km^{2}). The racial makeup of the hamlet was 11.11% White, 80.89% Native American, and 8.00% from two or more races. 4.44% of the population were Hispanic or Latino of any race.

There were 74 households, out of which 44.6% had children under the age of 18 living with them, 51.4% were married couples living together, 20.3% had a female householder with no husband present, and 24.3% were non-families. 21.6% of all households were made up of individuals, and 6.8% had someone living alone who was 65 years of age or older. The average household size was 3.04 and the average family size was 3.52.

In the hamlet the age distribution of the population shows 36.4% under the age of 18, 6.7% from 18 to 24, 20.4% from 25 to 44, 27.6% from 45 to 64, and 8.9% who were 65 years of age or older. The median age was 33 years. For every 100 females, there were 84.4 males. For every 100 females age 18 and over, there were 90.7 males.

The median income for a household in the hamlet was $52,500, and the median income for a family was $54,375. Males had a median income of $38,333 versus $45,625 for females. The per capita income for the hamlet was $19,324. About 6.1% of families and 6.0% of the population were below the poverty line, including 8.8% of those under the age of eighteen and 4.5% of those 65 or over.

== Religion ==
One of the most unique features of Kodiak is Orthodox monasticism in America. Indeed, Saint Herman of Alaska, the member of the original Russian missionary team from Valaam Monastery and America's first canonized Orthodox saint, had lived here for more than twenty years, until his death in 1836. Today two monastic communities—Saint Archangel Michael Skete for men and Saint Nilus Skete for women—live in close proximity to St. Herman's hermitage and strive to follow St. Herman's example of prayer, simplicity, and living off the land and sea. The two sketes, affiliated with Saint Herman of Alaska Monastery in Platina, California, are under the jurisdiction of Bishop Maksim Vasiljević of the Serbian Orthodox Church in North and South America.

== Education ==
The Ouzinkie School, a K-12 rural school, is operated by the Kodiak Island Borough School District.

== Public services ==
In 2021, Ouzinkie became a part of the Energy Transitions Initiative Partnership Project via the Renewable Energy Alaska Project; the project will help the city (and several other remote villages in Alaska) develop renewable energy sources and increase its energy efficiency.
