= Wildwood, California =

Unincorporated community in California, United States

- Unincorporated community
- Location within California Location within the United States
- Coordinates: 37°09′05″N 122°08′10″W
- Country: United States
- State: California
- County: Santa Cruz
- Elevation: 541 ft (165 m)
- Time zone: UTC-8 (Pacific (PST))
  - Summer (DST): UTC-7 (PDT)
- Area code: 831
- GNIS feature ID: 1660180

Wildwood is an unincorporated community in Santa Cruz County, California, United States.
