= Platina, California =

Unincorporated community in California, United States

- Unincorporated community Census-designated place
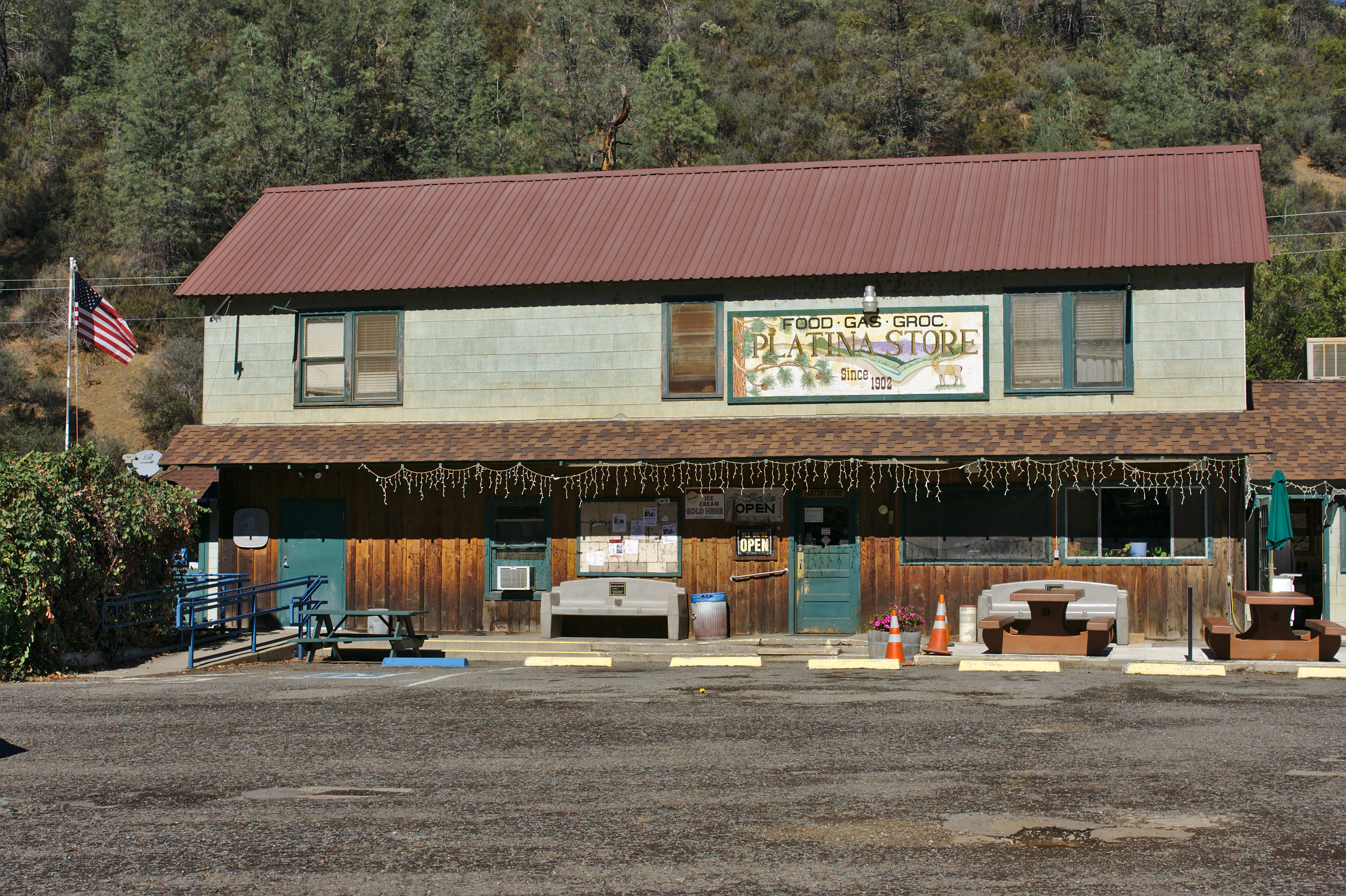
- Platina general store

- Location within California Location within the United States
- Coordinates: 40°21′35″N 122°53′41″W
- Country: United States
- State: California
- County: Shasta

Area
  - Total: 2.069 sq mi (5.36 km^{2})
  - Land: 2.069 sq mi (5.36 km^{2})
  - Water: 0 sq mi (0 km^{2})
- Elevation: 2,277 ft (694 m)

Population (2020)
  - Total: 13
  - Density: 6.3/sq mi (2.4/km^{2})
- Time zone: UTC-8 (Pacific (PST))
  - Summer (DST): UTC-7 (PDT)
- ZIP code: 96076
- Area code: 530
- GNIS feature ID: 264843

Platina (Spanish for "platinum") is a small unincorporated community and census-designated place (CDP) in Shasta County, California, approximately and equidistantly 40 miles (64 km) west of Redding and Red Bluff. Its population is 13 as of the 2020 census. Its ZIP code is 96076. Wired telephone numbers follow the pattern 530-352-xxxx.

== History ==
Platina was founded as Noble's Station in 1902, named after Don Noble, a local resident. It served as a stage stop for stagecoaches traveling to and from Red Bluff to Knob, Wildwood, Peanut, and Hayfork. A boarding house, general store and post office were located in the tiny settlement.

During the 1920s, Noble and others discovered platinum in nearby Beegum Creek, causing Noble's Station to quickly become known as "Platina". Platina is a native alloy of platinum with osmium and other related metals.

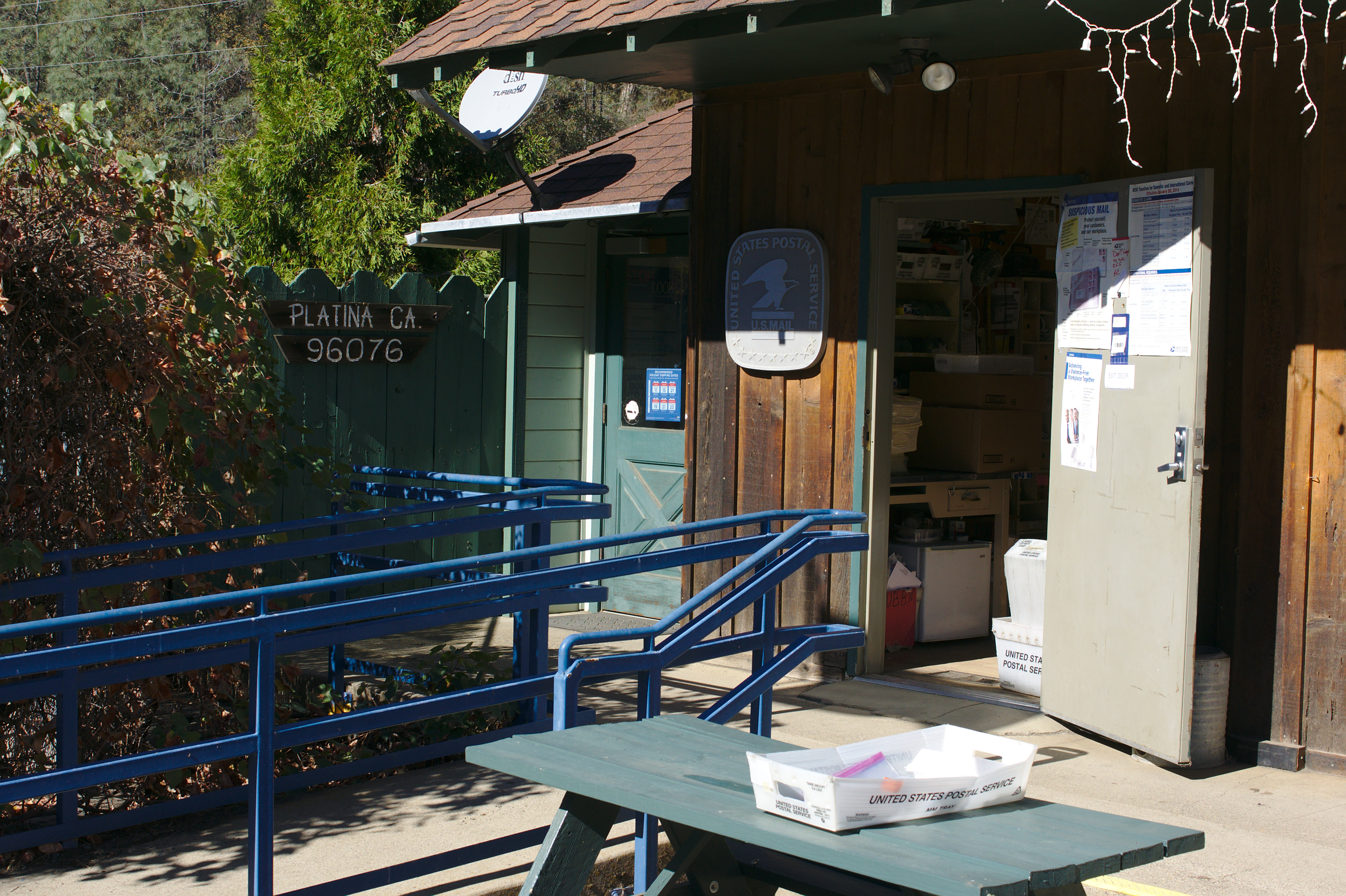
Platina post office

The current Platina post office was established in 1921. Today, it and the general store stand on almost the same spot as the old station. The store's owners recently tried to sell it and a few other buildings in town on eBay, but were unsuccessful.

== Monastery ==
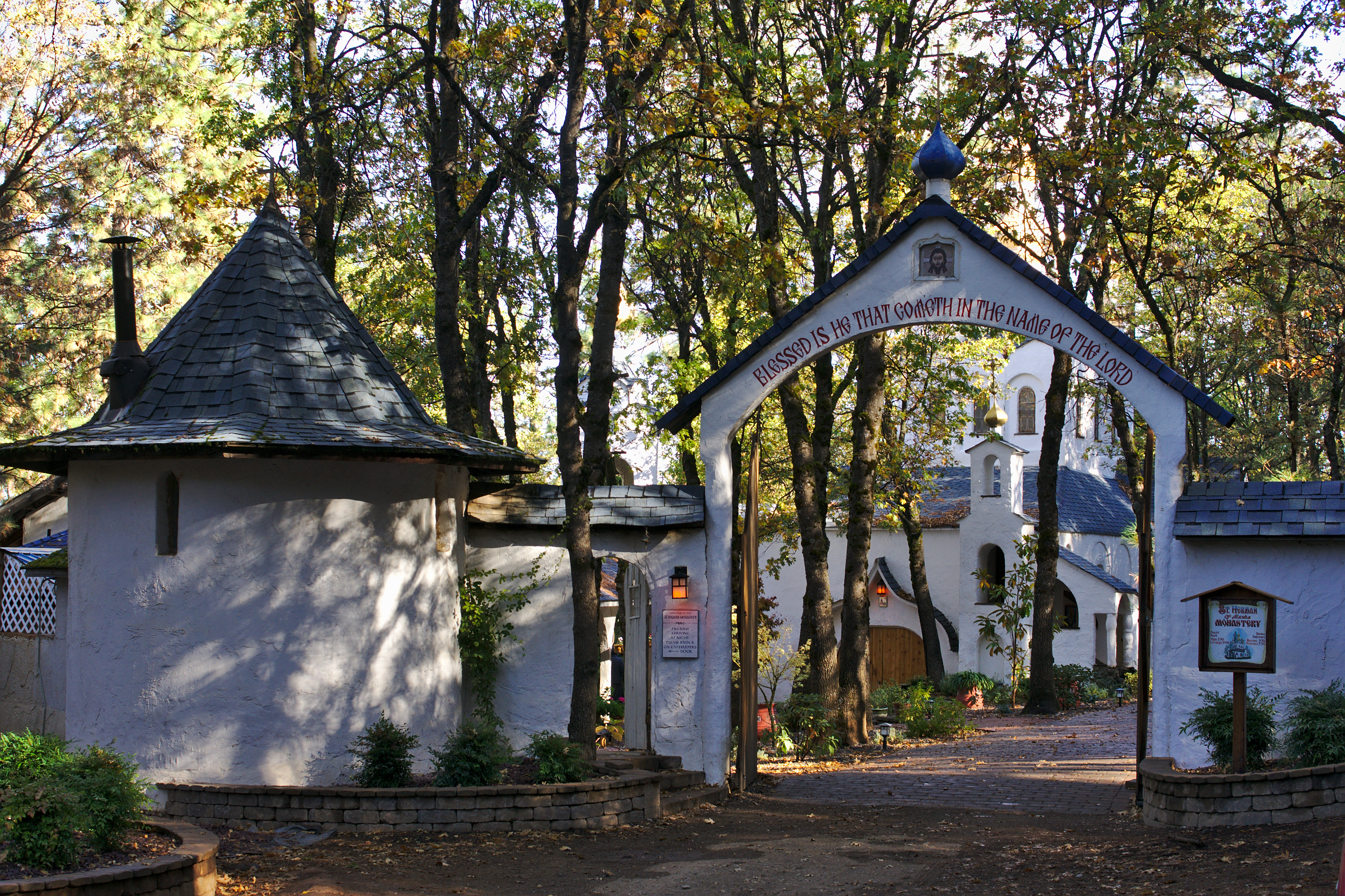
Saint Herman of Alaska Monastery

Saint Herman of Alaska Monastery, a monastic community of the Serbian Orthodox Church, is located just outside of Platina, to the south. It was founded in 1968 by Fr. Herman Podmoshensky and Fr. Seraphim Rose, with the blessing of St. John the Wonderworker, Archbishop of Shanghai and San Francisco. Rose was a graduate of Pomona College and the University of California at Berkeley who converted to Russian Orthodoxy and became a prolific author and translator of ancient Orthodox texts, many of which were printed at the monastery. Fr. Seraphim died September 2, 1982, and is buried in the monastery cemetery.

Fr. Seraphim is revered by many Orthodox Christians around the world. Although he has not been formally canonized (as of 2024) by any Orthodox synod, he has been locally canonized in the Metropolis of Akhalkalaki, Kumurdo, and Kari of the Georgian Orthodox Church.

== Politics ==
In the state legislature, Platina is located in the 1st senatorial district, represented by Republican Megan Dahle, and in the 1st Assembly district, represented by Republican Heather Hadwick.

Federally, Platina is in California's 1st congressional district, represented by Republican James Gallagher.

== Climate ==
According to the Köppen Climate Classification system, Platina has a warm-summer Mediterranean climate, abbreviated "Csa" on climate maps.

Climate data for Platina, California
Month	Jan	Feb	Mar	Apr	May	Jun	Jul	Aug	Sep	Oct	Nov	Dec	Year
Record high °F (°C)	75 (24)	78 (26)	82 (28)	91 (33)	100 (38)	106 (41)	112 (44)	110 (43)	108 (42)	98 (37)	88 (31)	75 (24)	112 (44)
Mean maximum °F (°C)	66 (19)	68 (20)	73 (23)	79 (26)	90 (32)	99 (37)	103 (39)	102 (39)	99 (37)	90 (32)	77 (25)	64 (18)	103 (39)
Mean daily maximum °F (°C)	49.5 (9.7)	52.9 (11.6)	57.5 (14.2)	63.3 (17.4)	72.5 (22.5)	82.8 (28.2)	91.5 (33.1)	90.7 (32.6)	85.3 (29.6)	72.9 (22.7)	56.7 (13.7)	49.3 (9.6)	68.7 (20.4)
Daily mean °F (°C)	40.8 (4.9)	43.2 (6.2)	47.1 (8.4)	51.7 (10.9)	59.4 (15.2)	67.3 (19.6)	74.2 (23.4)	72.8 (22.7)	65.3 (18.5)	55.6 (13.1)	46.8 (8.2)	40.6 (4.8)	55.4 (13.0)
Mean daily minimum °F (°C)	32.2 (0.1)	33.6 (0.9)	36.7 (2.6)	40.1 (4.5)	46.2 (7.9)	51.9 (11.1)	55.8 (13.2)	55.0 (12.8)	45.2 (7.3)	38.4 (3.6)	36.9 (2.7)	31.9 (−0.1)	42.0 (5.6)
Mean minimum °F (°C)	20 (−7)	21 (−6)	21 (−6)	24 (−4)	30 (−1)	34 (1)	43 (6)	44 (7)	37 (3)	30 (−1)	24 (−4)	20 (−7)	17 (−8)
Record low °F (°C)	4 (−16)	−2 (−19)	13 (−11)	12 (−11)	21 (−6)	17 (−8)	28 (−2)	34 (1)	25 (−4)	18 (−8)	11 (−12)	−3 (−19)	−3 (−19)
Average precipitation inches (mm)	6.48 (165)	5.06 (129)	5.10 (130)	2.42 (61)	2.04 (52)	0.70 (18)	0.13 (3.3)	0.11 (2.8)	0.24 (6.1)	1.75 (44)	3.42 (87)	7.91 (201)	35.36 (899.2)
Average snowfall inches (cm)	6.8 (17)	3.3 (8.4)	3.2 (8.1)	0.4 (1.0)	0.0 (0.0)	0.0 (0.0)	0.0 (0.0)	0.0 (0.0)	0.0 (0.0)	0.0 (0.0)	1.0 (2.5)	5.4 (14)	20.1 (51)
Source: NOAA

== Demographics ==
Historical population
Census	Pop.	Note	%±
2020	13		—
U.S. Decennial Census; 1850–1870 1880-1890; 1900 1910 1920; 1930 1940 1950; 1960 1970 1980; 1990 2000 2010; 2020

Platina first appeared as a census designated place in the 2020 U.S. census. It was reported that in about 2001, Platina had an estimated population of 60.

=== 2020 Census ===
Platina CDP, California – Racial and ethnic composition Note: the US Census treats Hispanic/Latino as an ethnic category. This table excludes Latinos from the racial categories and assigns them to a separate category. Hispanics/Latinos may be of any race.
Race / Ethnicity (NH = Non-Hispanic)	Pop 2020	% 2020
White alone (NH)	6	46.15%
Black or African American alone (NH)	0	0.00%
Native American or Alaska Native alone (NH)	1	7.69%
Asian alone (NH)	0	0.00%
Pacific Islander alone (NH)	0	0.00%
Other race alone (NH)	1	7.69%
Mixed race or Multiracial (NH)	2	15.38%
Hispanic or Latino (any race)	3	23.08%
Total	13	100.00%

== Notable people ==
- Seraphim Rose, Eastern Orthodox hieromonk and author
