= Maksim Vasiljević =

Serbian Orthodox bishop

His Grace Maksim (Maxim) Vasiljević
- Bishop
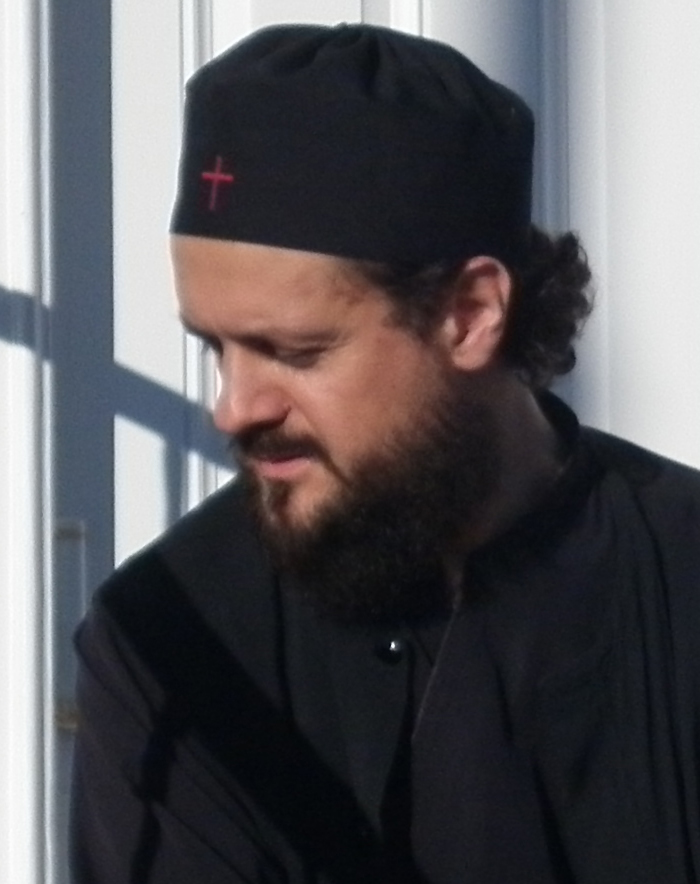
- Bishop Maksim in 2013
- Church: Serbian Orthodox Church
- Diocese: Eparchy of Western America
- Installed: 30 July 2006
- Predecessor: Jovan Mladenović

Orders
- Ordination: 1996
- Consecration: 2004

Personal details
- Born: Milan Vasiljević; 27 June 1968 (age 58) Foča, SR Bosnia and Herzegovina, SFR Yugoslavia
- Denomination: Serbian Orthodox Christian

Maksim Vasiljević (Serbian Cyrillic: Максим Васиљевић; born 27 June 1968 as Milan Vasiljević) is the Bishop of the Eparchy of Western America of the Serbian Orthodox Church.

== Academic education and ecclesiastical career ==
He earned his doctorate from the University of Athens in the field of dogmatics and patristics in 1999 and was tonsured a monk at the Tvrdoš Monastery in Bosnia and Herzegovina.

Previously, he had occupied the throne of the vicar bishop of Hum, in the Metropolitanate of Dabar-Bosnia. He entertained a one-year post-doctoral course on Byzantine History and Theology at the Sorbonne in Paris from 2003-4. At the same time, as a visiting professor at the French Academy of Fine Arts (Beaux-arts) in Paris, he dealt with the theory and practice of painting. He used to lecture at the Orthodox Theological Faculty in Foča. He taught Patristics for thirteen years at the University of Belgrade's School of Orthodox Theology. He is currently teaching at the Hellenic College Holy Cross Greek Orthodox School of Theology.

He was enthroned by Bishop Longin of the New Gračanica Metropolitanate, at the Saint Steven Cathedral in Alhambra, California. He also succeeded Bishop Longin, who previously served as the administrator of the diocese. Bishop Maksim was elected to the see of the Serbian Orthodox Eparchy of Western America at the regular session of the Council of Bishops of the Serbian Orthodox Church, held in 2006.

He has taught numerous courses on the writings of the Church Fathers and published widely in the field of patristics, hagiography, church history, and iconography.

From 2005 to 2010, he was the editor of the Theology magazine, the official journal of the Faculty of Orthodox Theology in Belgrade. He is the founder and editor of the publishing house Sevastijan Press, which has published about 200 books on theology, history, philosophy, and art (among others, by Justin Popović, Atanasije Jevtić, John Zizioulas, Stamatis Skliris, etc.).

He is the founder and editor of the Serbica Americana foundation and website; he founded and edits the website Holy Icon , as well as the website and electronic magazine The Poetics of the Icon , dedicated to contemporary iconography, as well as the website of Bishop Athanasius . He launched with a group of developers OrthoPrax (OrthoPrax) - the leading and most complete Orthodox iPhone and Android application in the world. He is the official representative of the Serbian Orthodox Church in the Diaspora Assembly and Commission for Faith and Order of the World Council of Churches (Faith and Order WCC). He is the secretary of the Episcopal Council of the Serbian Orthodox Church in America.

In addition to pastoral and academic work, he is engaged in painting. His paintings have been exhibited in Athens, New York, Boston, San Francisco, Los Angeles, Belgrade, etc. His interest in Dostoevsky's characters resulted in a series of painting exhibitions with the group Ochra from Athens . He is the director and teacher of the Diocesan iconographic school inspired by Byzantine paintings and icons of Stamatis Skliris. He is the honorary president of the "Serbian Treasure" foundation. He is the editor of the Yearbook of the Diocese of Western America. He is one of the founders of the student magazine Logos (1991) and a long-time member of the editorial board of the magazine Vidoslov of the Diocese of Zahumlje and Herzegovina (1994–2003). He is the president of the Committee for Theological Education of the Assembly of Canonical Orthodox Bishops of the USA and the spiritual father of the Orthodox Inter Seminary Movement (OISM).

== Selected works ==
- Vasiljević, Maksim, ed. (2015). The Christian Heritage of Kosovo and Metohija: the Historical and Spiritual Heartland of the Serbian People. Los Angeles: Sebastian Press. ISBN 9788682685395.
- History, Truth, Holiness (Los Angeles, Sebastian Press: 2011)
- Diary of the Council (Los Angeles-Crete 2016)
- Holiness: Divine and Human (Belgrade: 2010, in Serbian)
- Theology as a Surprise (New York, St. Vladimir Seminary Press: 2018)
- Wonder as the Beginning of Faith (Brookline, Holy Cross Orthodox Press: 2022)
- Saved by Beauty: Dostoevsky and America (Los Angeles, Sebastian Press 2022)

Serbian Orthodox Church titles
Preceded by Jovan Mladenović	Bishop of Western America; 2006–present	Succeeded by incumbent
