= Omophorion =

Bishop's scarf in Eastern Orthodoxy and Eastern Catholicism

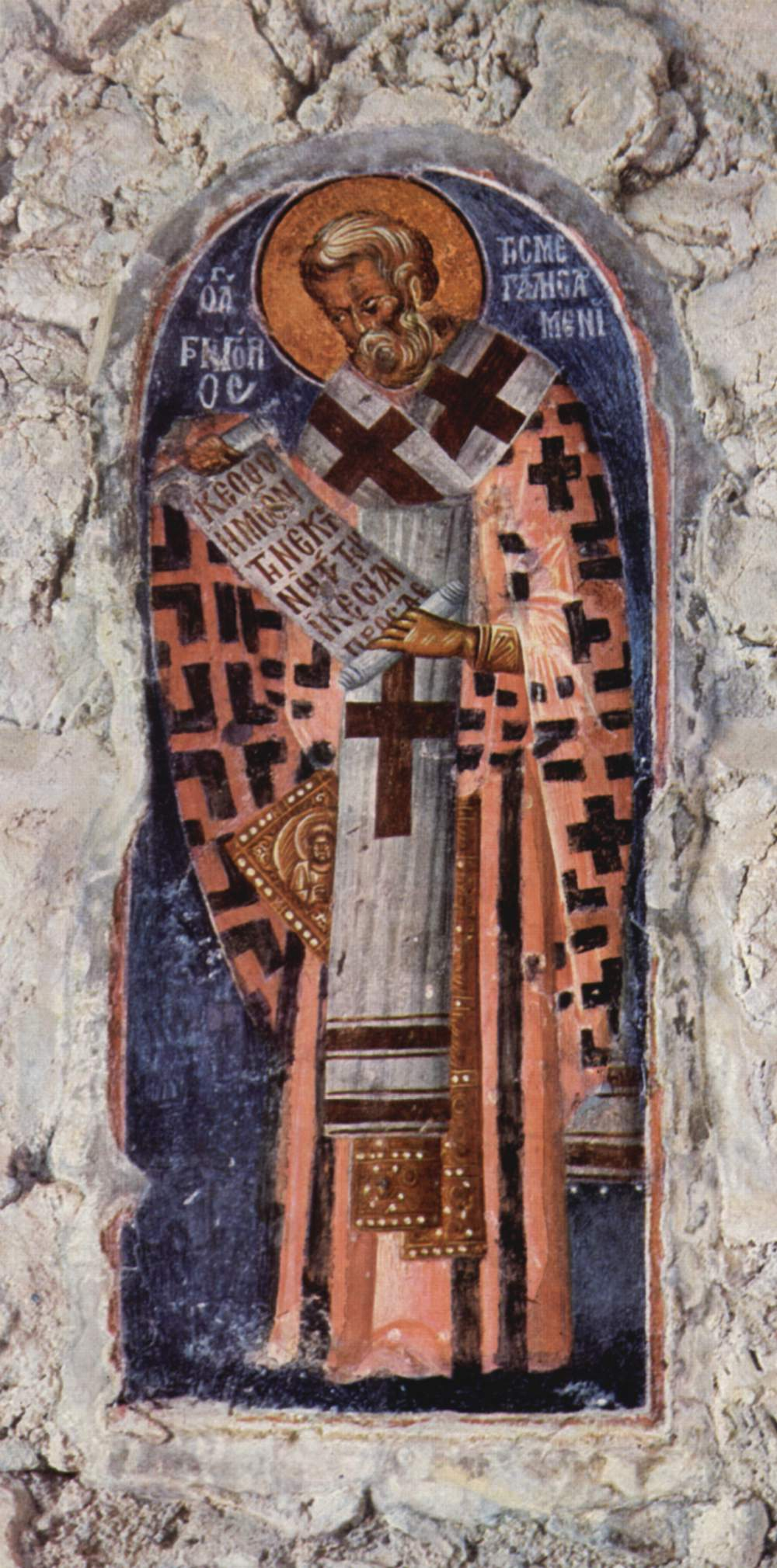
Fresco from the 14th century depicting St. Gregory the Illuminator of Armenia wearing a white omophorion.

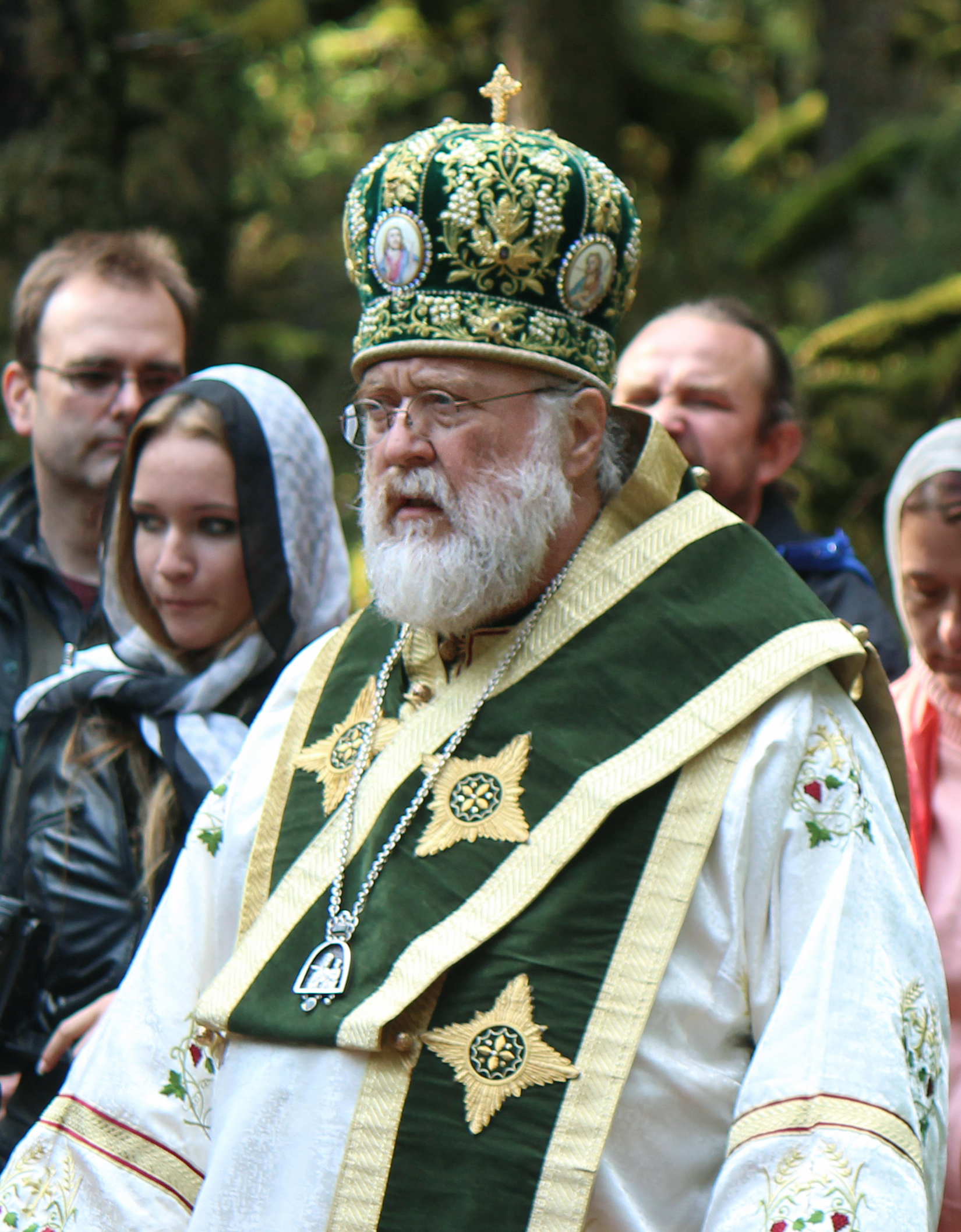
Benjamin Peterson, archbishop of the Orthodox Church in America Diocese of Alaska, wearing an omophorion.

In the Eastern Orthodox and Eastern Catholic liturgical tradition, the omophorion (Ancient Greek: ὠμοφόριον, meaning "[something] borne on the shoulders"; Slavonic: омофоръ, omofor) is the distinguishing vestment of a bishop and the symbol of his spiritual and ecclesiastical authority. Originally woven of wool, it is a band of brocade decorated with four crosses and an eight-pointed star; it is worn about the neck and shoulders.

By symbolizing the lost sheep that is found and carried on the Good Shepherd's shoulders, it signifies the bishop's pastoral role as the icon of Christ. All Eastern Orthodox bishops wear the omophorion. Clergy and ecclesiastical institutions, including seminaries, subject to a bishop's authority are often said to be "under his omophorion" (see Ecclesiastical jurisdiction).

The equivalent vestment in Western Christian usage is the archiepiscopal pallium, the use of which is subject to different rubrics and restrictions.

== Use ==
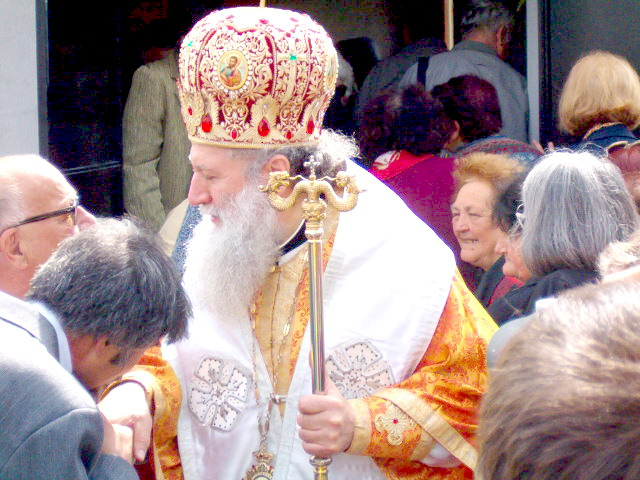
Metropolitan Neophyte Dimitrov wearing small omophorion.

The omophorion has two forms: the ancient great omophorion, which passes around the neck, is folded in the front, and hangs down past the knees in both the front and the back, like a loosely worn long scarf; and the small omophorion which is much simpler, passing around the neck and hanging down in the front similar to an epitrachelion (stole), only wider and shorter, coming down a little past the waist. Because of the complexity of the great omophorion, and because of the dignity of the episcopal office, whenever the bishop puts on the omophorion or takes it off, he is assisted by two subdeacons.

Whenever the bishop presides at any divine service, he will be vested in the omophorion. If he is serving the Divine Liturgy, he will wear both the great and the small omophorion at different times over his liturgical vestments. At any service other than the Divine Liturgy, he will usually wear the small omophorion.

At the Divine Liturgy, the rubrics call for the bishop to put on and take off the omophorion numerous times. When he is first vested, the subdeacons place the great omophorion on him, but afterwards, when the rubric calls for him to wear the omophorion, it is replaced, for the sake of convenience, with the small omophorion.

In modern practice in the Slavic tradition, when several bishops concelebrate, it is now the custom for the chief celebrant to use the great omophorion when called for, and the other bishops to wear the small omophorion throughout, with all bishops wearing their mitres. In modern Greek Patriarchal practice, on the other hand, all concelebrating bishops wear the great omophorion at the beginning of the Divine Liturgy, with only the chief celebrant wearing the mitre and the other bishops wearing their kalimavkia with the Epanokalimavkion. In other local Churches, notably the Church of Greece, all concelebrating bishops wear both the great omophorion and the mitre, and even carry their staffs.

In the Ruthenian Greek Catholic Church and the Ukrainian Greek Catholic Church, often only the great omophorion is used. In this simplified usage, the great omophorion is not replaced by the small omophorion, and is worn by the bishop throughout the entire liturgy. In such cases, the omophorion is often sewn into shape and can be simply draped onto the shoulders rather than wrapped on by assistants. Some Ukrainian Greek Catholic bishops, however, insist on the full ceremonial.

During the All-Night Vigil, the bishop will wear the small omophorion at the beginning, but near the end will change into the great omophorion for the Great Doxology.

== Development ==
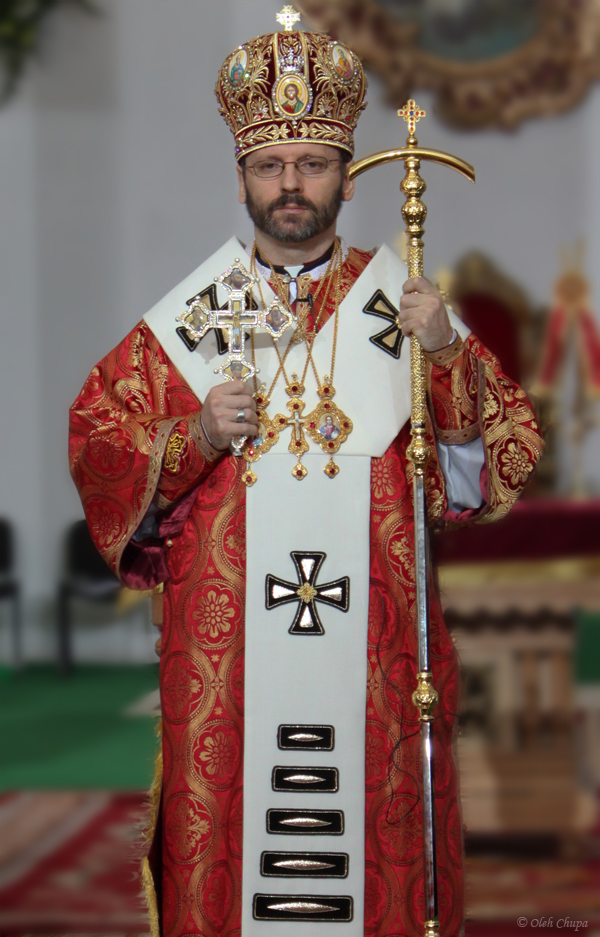
Major archbishop Sviatoslav Shevchuk, of the Ukrainian Greek Catholic Church, wearing a white omophorion which has been sewn into shape. The five bars at the bottom signify his position as head of an Eastern rite church.

In the early church, the omophorion was a broad band of white wool ornamented with crosses and draped loosely over the neck, shoulders, and breast. The modern Roman pallium developed from this early omophorion. In the West, over the centuries, its form changed into a circular, thin, woolen garment for the shoulders, with short, weighted, pendant lappets before and behind. In an act of reversion from the modern form of Papal pallium, the form that Pope Benedict XVI wore from the beginning of his pontificate was closer to that of the original omophorion, but he later reverted to the modern form of the pallium yet substituted red crosses instead of black ones.

In the East, the only change in the omophorion has been an increase in its width and a shift in the material from which it is made. The omophorion was documented about the year 400 AD as a liturgical vestment of the bishop in Isidore of Pelusium. It was made of wool and was already seen as symbolic of the duties of bishops as shepherds of their flocks. In the miniatures of an Alexandrian Chronicle of the World, written probably during the fifth century, the omophorion was represented in an image. In later times, it was shown on the renowned ivory tablet of Trier, depicting the solemn translation of relics. Among the pictures dating from the seventh and eighth centuries, in which the omophorion is illustrated, are the lately discovered frescoes in S. Maria, Antiqua in the Roman Forum. The representation of the omophorion in these frescoes is essentially the same as the vestment in its present form.

The omophorion probably developed from the civil omophorion, a shoulder garment or shawl in general use. Bishops may have introduced directly by a positive precept a humeral cloth resembling the ordinary omophorion and called by that name, to be used as a liturgical pontifical badge. Alternatively, bishops may have used the civil omophorion as an ornament without any special significance, but in the course of time it gradually developed associations as a distinctively episcopal ornament. Finally it symbolized an episcopal badge of office.

=== Early omophorion ===
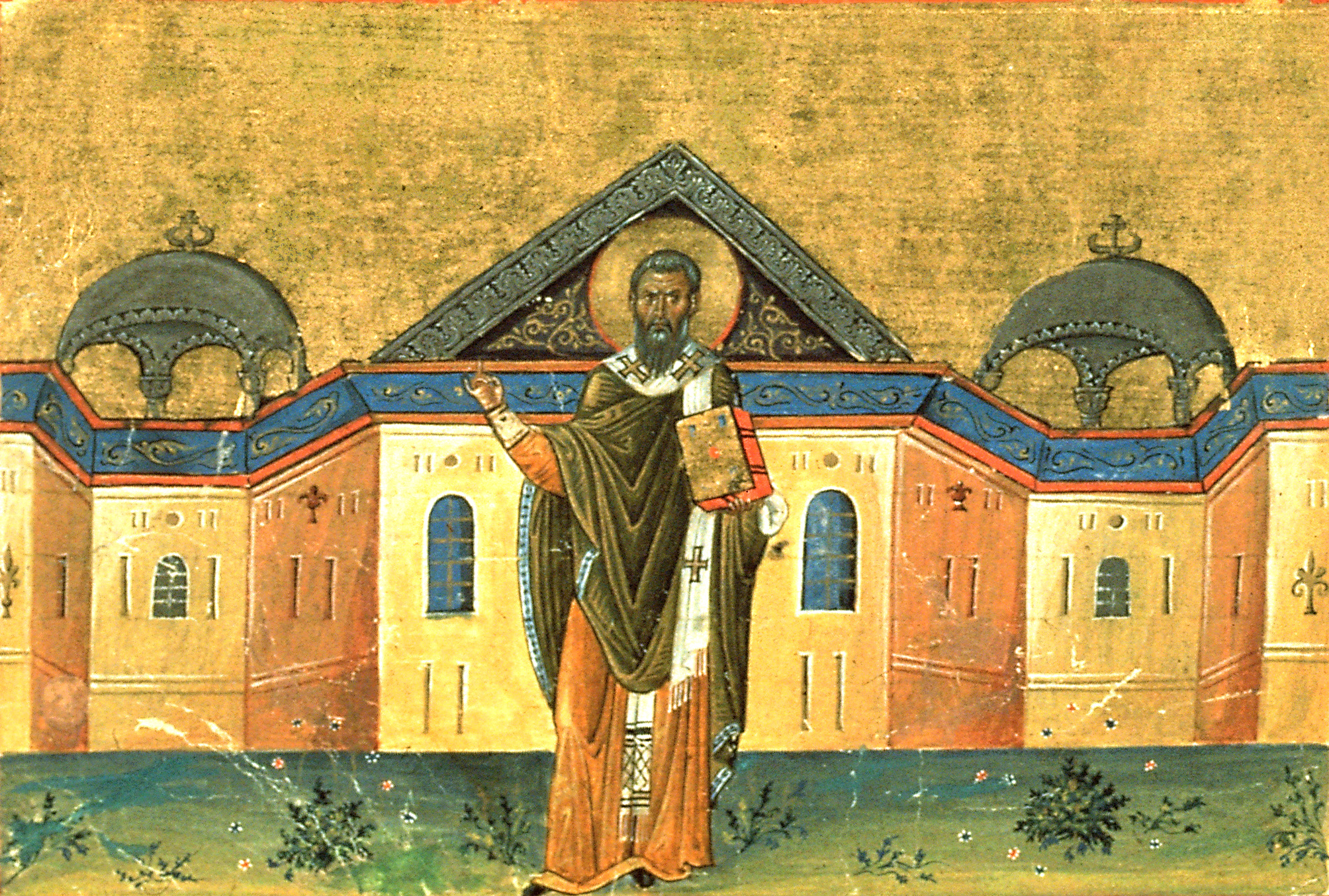
Omophorion seen in the Menologion of Basil II, ca. 1000 AD

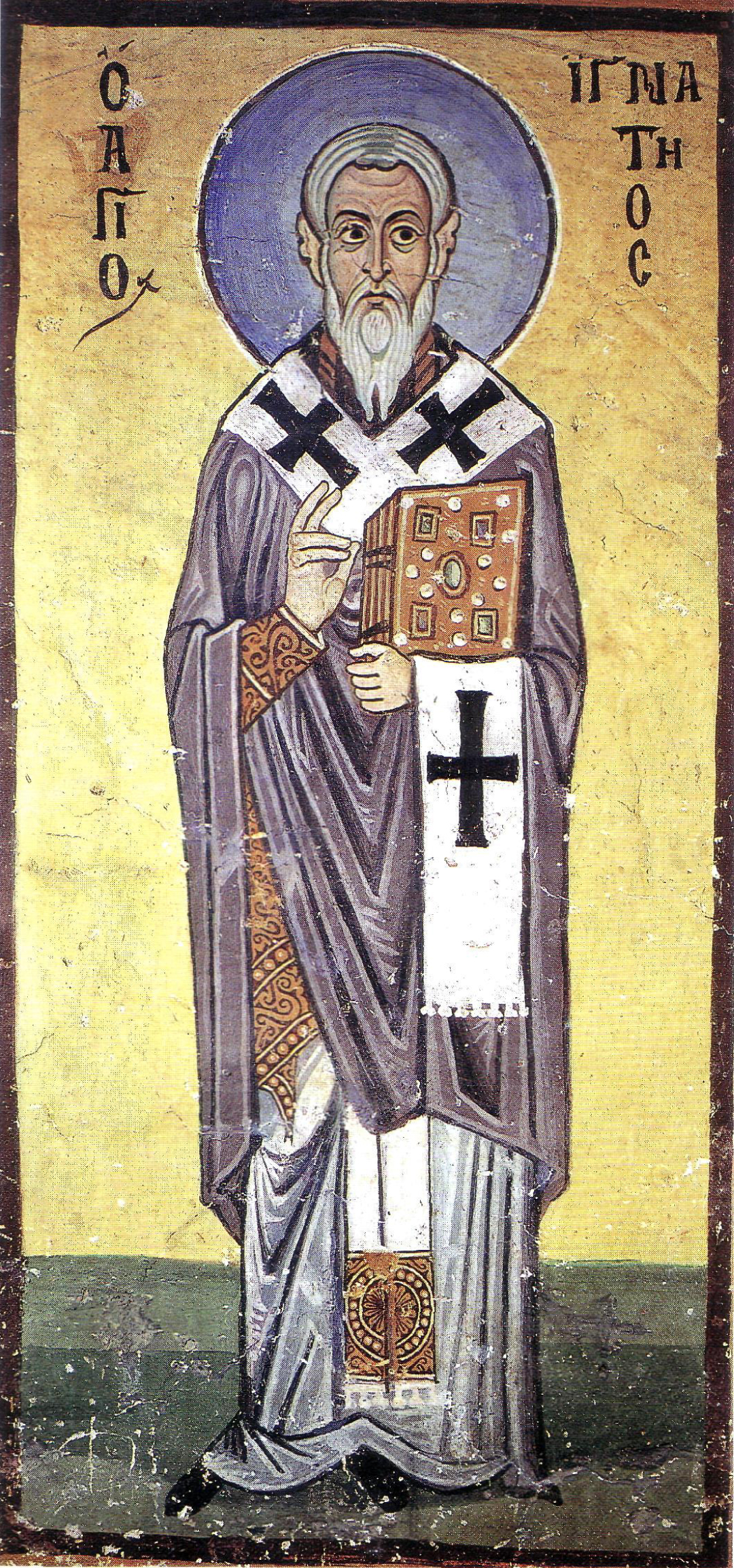
11-12th century fresco from the Hosios Loukas Monastery, Boeotia, Greece

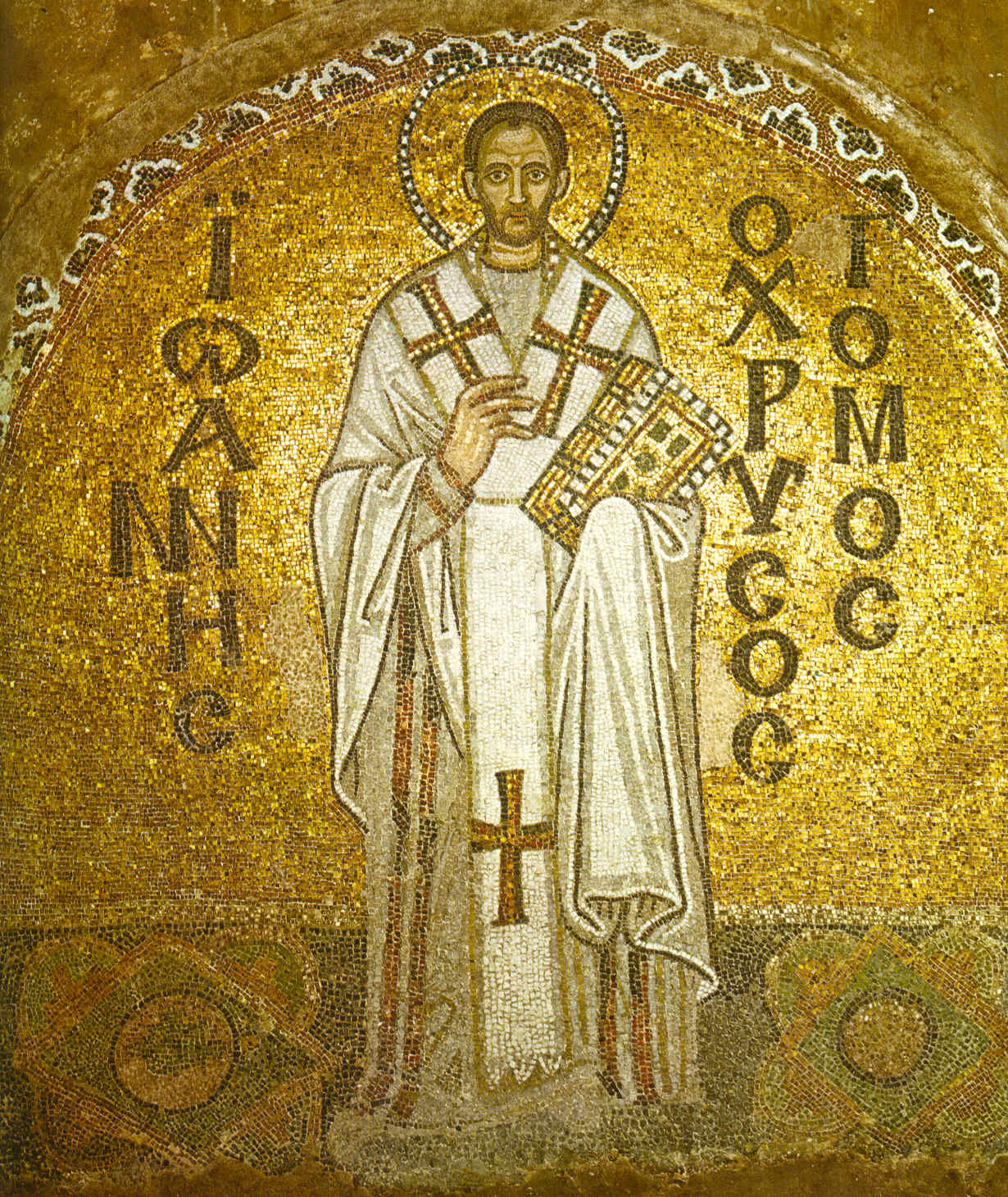
11th century mosaic from Hagia Sophia

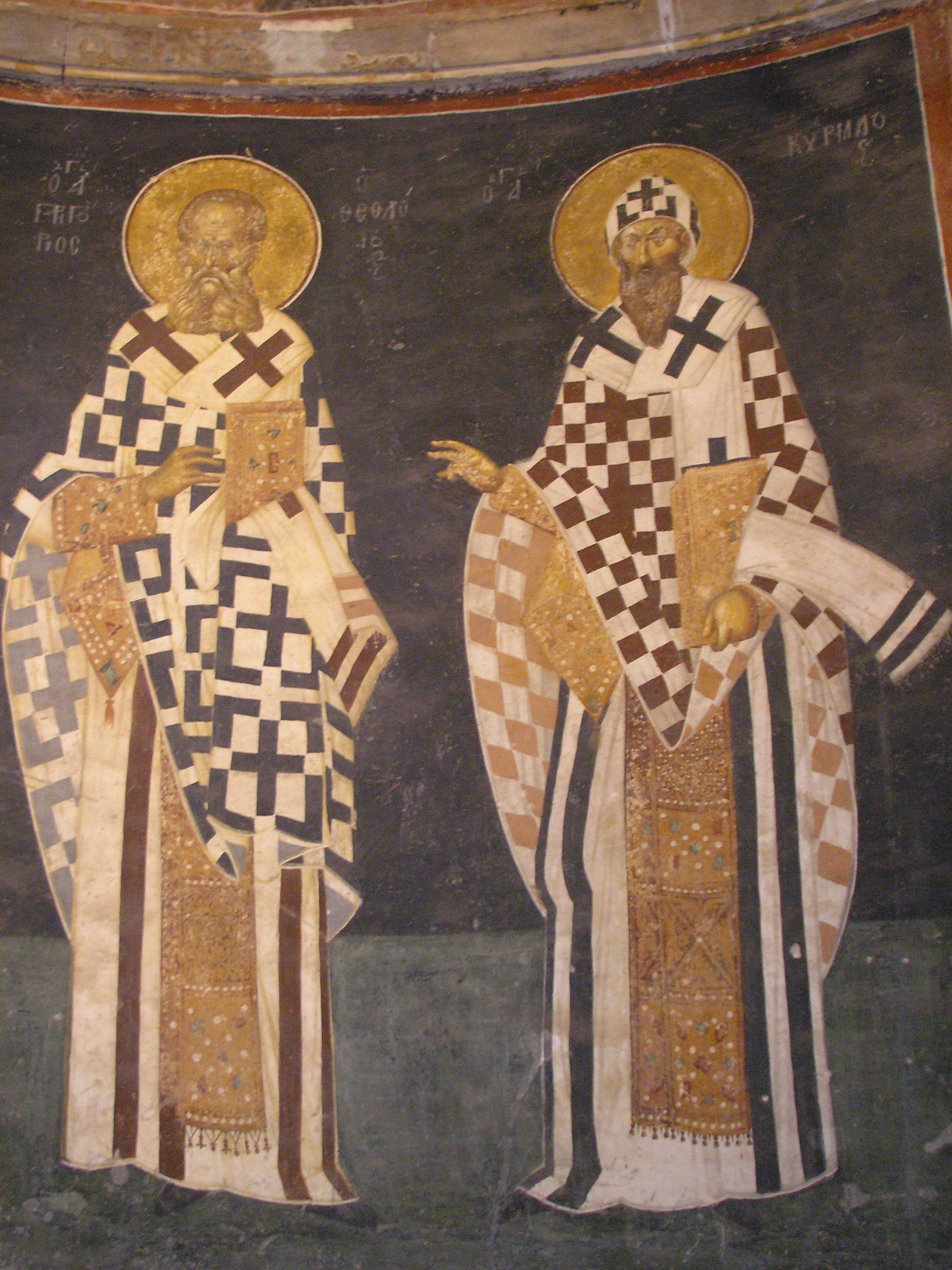
Frescoes from Chora Church, Constantinople

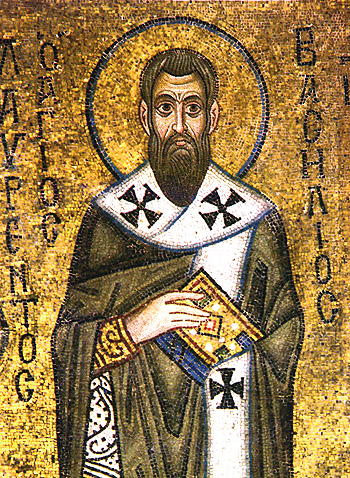
11th century mosaics from Saint Sophia Cathedral in Kyiv

== Oriental Orthodoxy ==
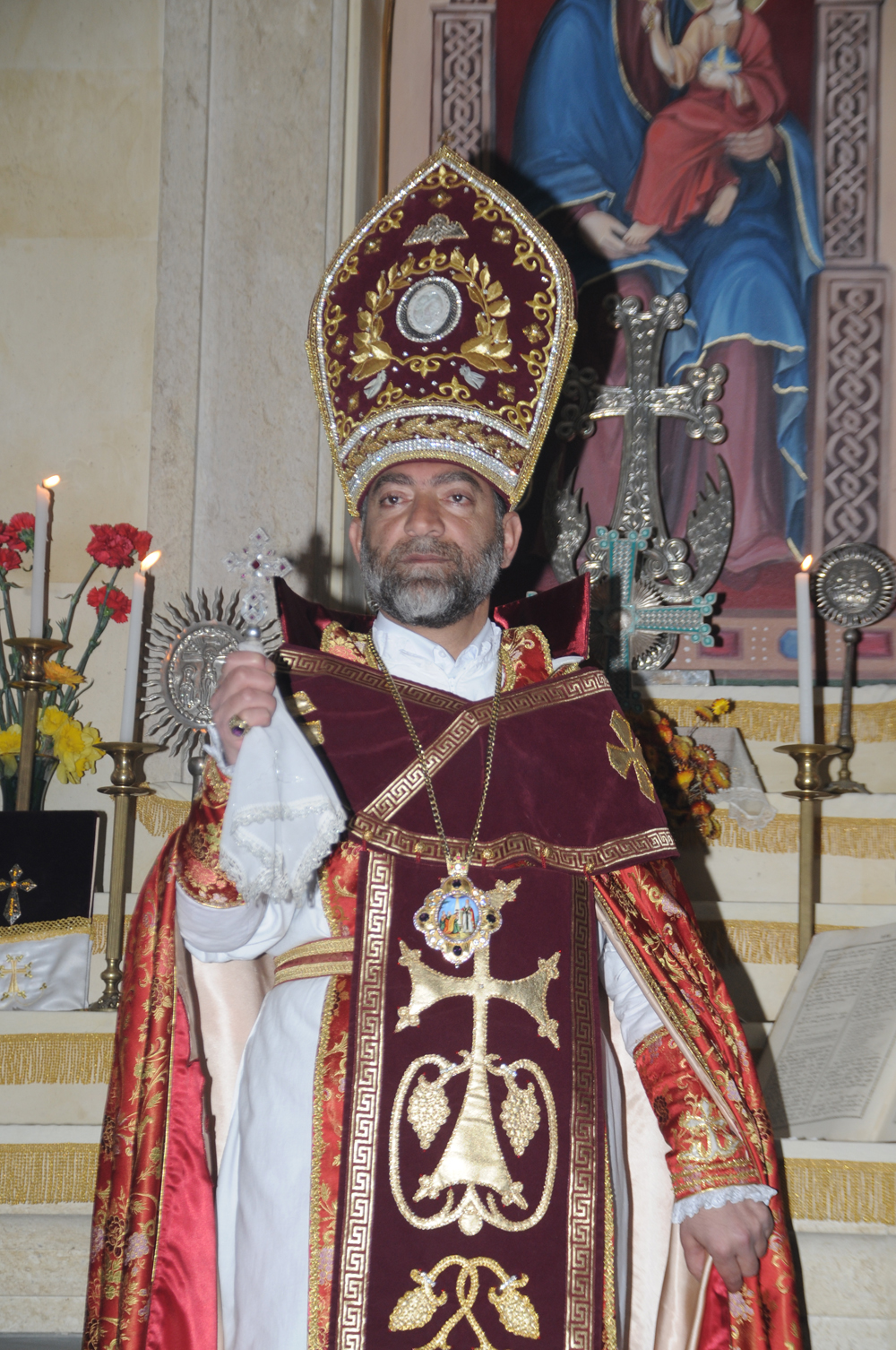
Archbishop Sebouh Chouldjian of the Armenian Apostolic Church wearing emip'oron during liturgy.

In Oriental Orthodoxy, the omophorion takes a number of different forms:

- The Armenian Apostolic emip'oron is similar to the Byzantine great omophorion.
- The Syriac Orthodox baţrašil or uroro rabbo ('great stole') is a straight strip of embroidered material, about 20 cm wide, with a head-hole midway along it, that hangs down a bishop's chest and back.
- Coptic Orthodox hierarchs (Patriarch, Metropolitans, and bishops) usually wear the omophorion folded due to its large width. It is white in colour, with extensive ornamental embroidery. It is wider than its Byzantine counterpart, wrapped over the head over the monastic kouklion, then crossed from the front over the chest, wrapped again from the back, crossed over the back by the waist level, then over the shoulders, then coming straight down, tucked under the frontal (over the chest) crossed wrapping. It is called a Ballin which is derived from the Greek word "Πάλλιον" (Pallium in Latin) and it is almost double the length of the Byzantine omophorion.

== See also ==
- Pallium
