= St. Nicholas Russian Orthodox Church (Juneau, Alaska) =

Historic church in Alaska, United States

- U.S. National Register of Historic Places
- Alaska Heritage Resources Survey
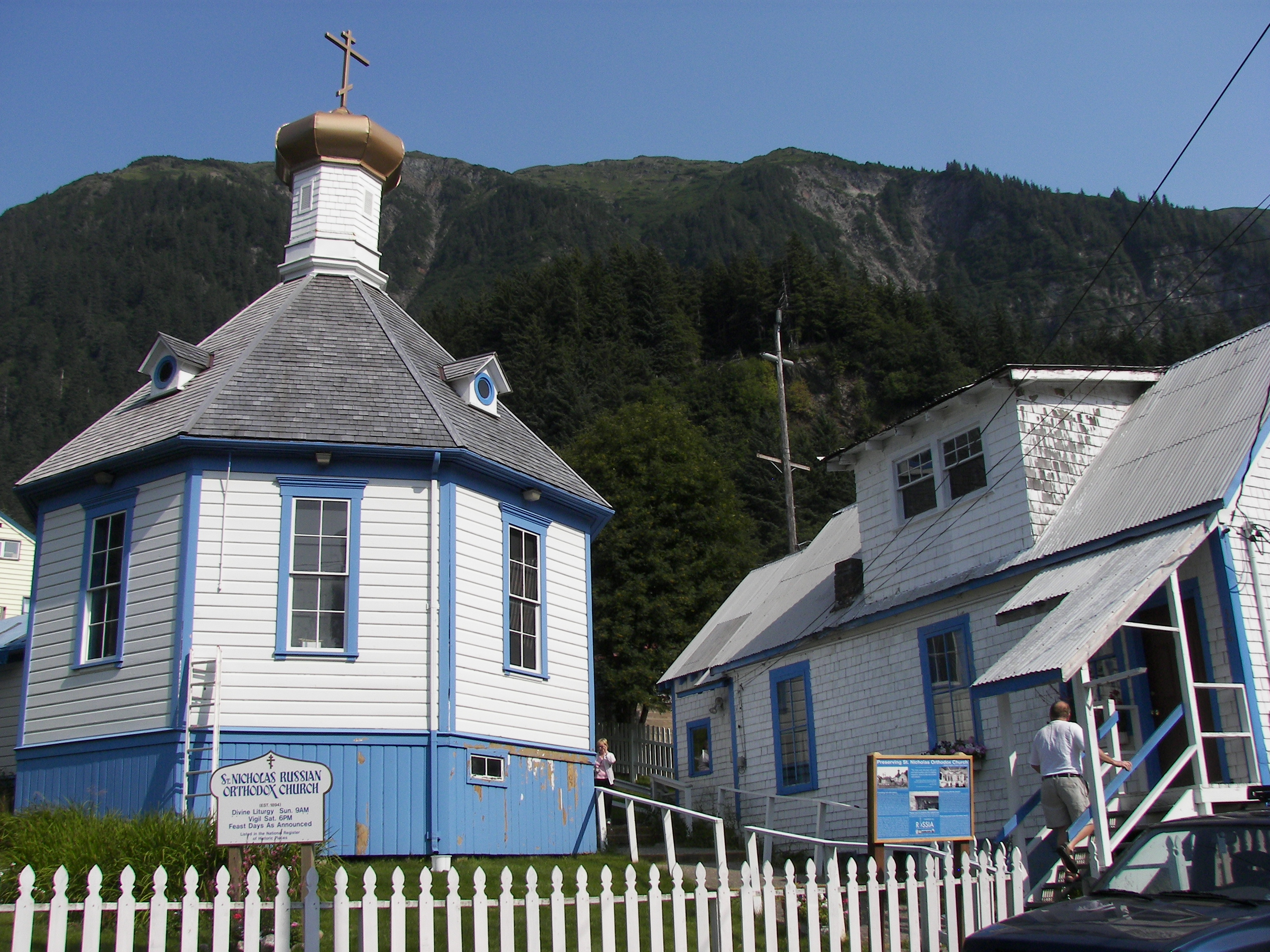

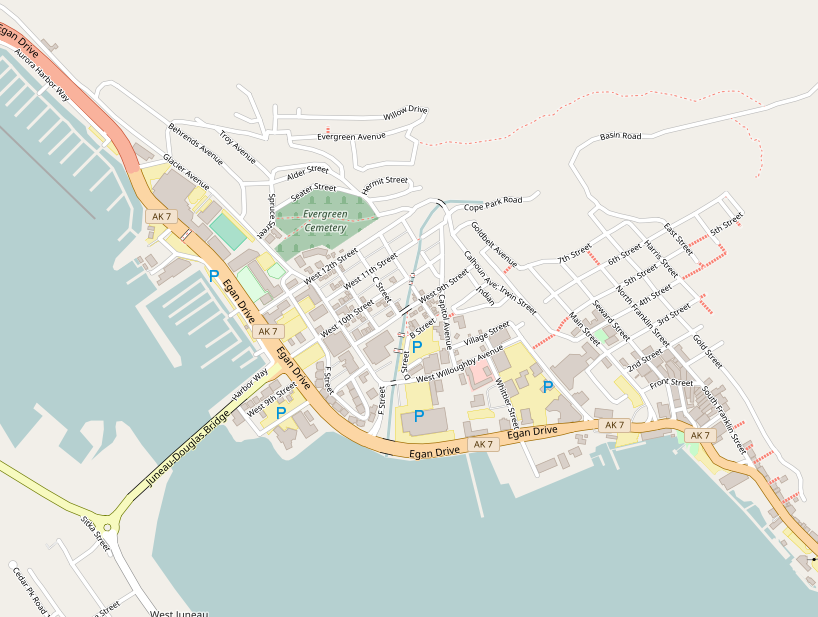
- Location within Juneau Location within Alaska
- Location: 326 Fifth Street, Juneau, Alaska
- Coordinates: 58°18′11″N 134°24′33″W
- Area: less than one acre
- Built: 1893
- Website: https://stnicholasjuneau.org/
- MPS: Russian Orthodox Church Buildings and Sites TR (AD)
- NRHP reference No.: 73000377
- AHRS No.: JUN-053
- Added to NRHP: September 19, 1973

The St. Nicholas Russian Orthodox Church (Russian: Церковь Святого Николая) in Juneau, Alaska, United States, was built in 1893 and was listed on the National Register of Historic Places in 1973. The church is a part of the Diocese of Alaska of the Orthodox Church in America.

== History ==
Russians did not settle in the Juneau area while this territory was a Russian colony (1784–1867). Nor did the Russian Orthodox Church send missionaries to Juneau when the mining settlement started in 1881. Instead, the Orthodox Church became strongly established here through the efforts of the local Tlingit leaders. In 1890, the Taku leader Anathahash traveled to Sitka to be baptized into the Orthodox faith. More traditional Tlingit gravitated toward the Orthodox Church among Christian offerings, as it had used local languages in worship since about 1800 in Kodiak and 1824 in the Aleutian Islands. The Holy Scriptures and much of the Divine Liturgy (as the Orthodox call the Mass, or Lord's Supper) had been translated into Tlingit by St. Innocent (Veniaminov) during his years as a priest in Sitka (1834–40) and later as Bishop of Alaska (1842–1850).

Anathahash returned from Sitka in 1890 with the Rev. Vladimir Donskoy, the first Russian Orthodox priest to conduct services in the area. During Fr. Vladimir's stay, he instructed and baptized many of the local Tlingit people. That year Alexei Yaakwaan, son of a Tlingit leader, converted to the Orthodox Church and encouraged his father, Yees Gaanaalx, leader of the L'eeneidí (Dog Salmon) people of Auke Bay, to be baptized. Sitka Chief Khlantych told the church that Yees Gaanaalx wanted to convert to Orthodoxy and that Tlingit would follow his example.

On July 26, 1892, Bishop Nicholas (Ziorov) of the Aleutian Islands and Alaska (1891–1898), visited Juneau from San Francisco, where the seat of the church in America had been located since 1872. The bishop was met by the Tlingit leaders wanting to convert. According to oral tradition, he was told that the Tlingit leaders had each been having a common, recurring dream. In their dream, a short, white-bearded, elderly man encouraged them to become Christian. When these leaders saw an icon of Saint Nicholas the Wonderworker, Archbishop of Myra in Lycia, they "recognized" him as being the man in their dreams. Three days later, the Priest-monk Mitrofan baptized both Yees Gaanaalx and his wife, giving them the Christian names of Dimitri and Elizabeth. Following their example, some 700 of approximately 1500 Tlingit in the area also converted to the Orthodox church.

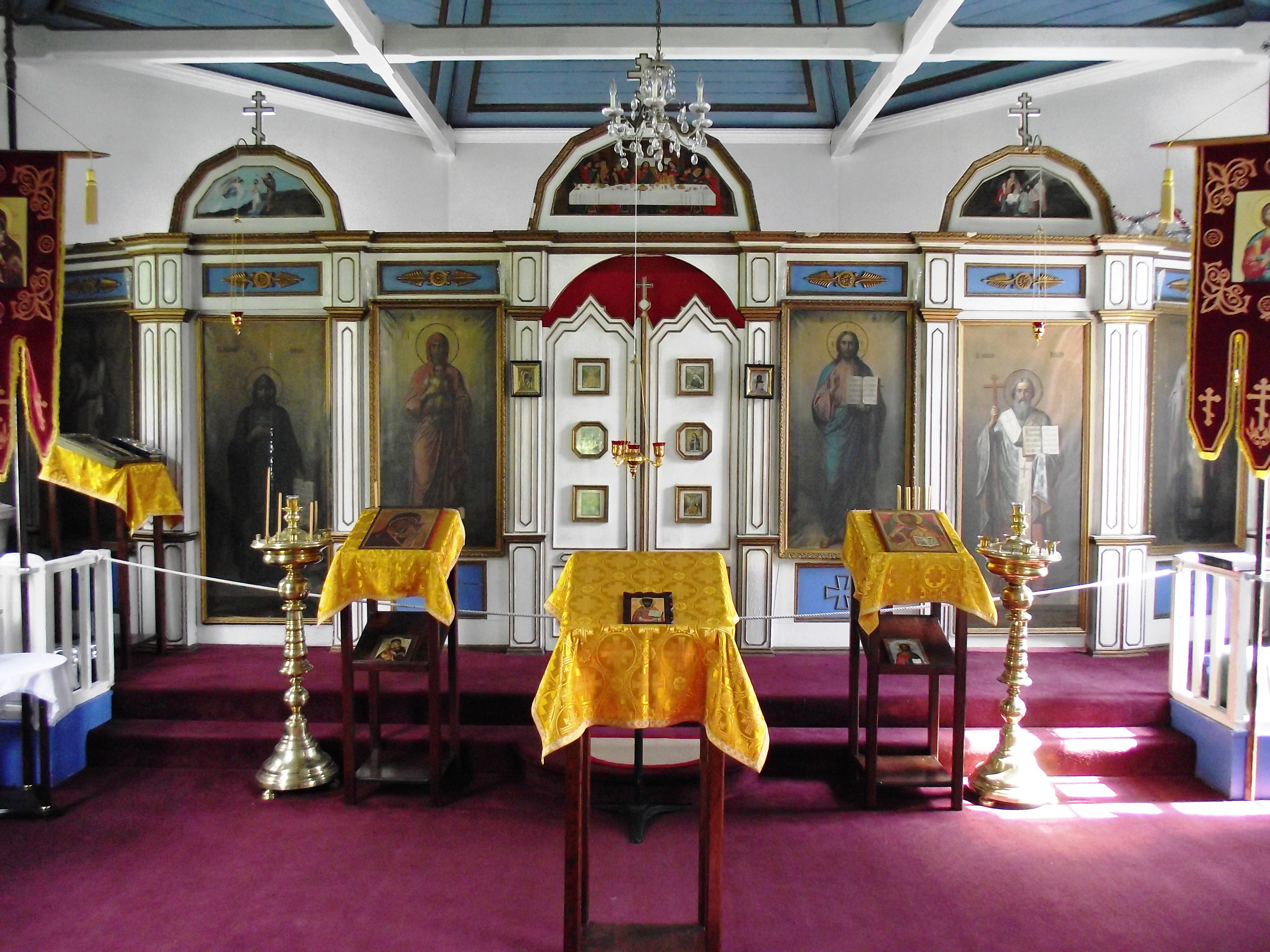
Iconostasis at St. Nicholas, June 2010

With such a large Native congregation to be served, the Orthodox Missionary Society in Russia sent architectural drawings, interior church furnishings – such as candlestands, a chalice set, censers, banners, a full iconostasis (the icon screen), and festal icons – and two hundred silver rubles to support construction of a church for them. The six large panels on the iconostasis are the original icons received from Russia and hold a unique position as the only known iconostasis where the deacon's doors depict Sts. Cyril and Methodius rather than either the Archangels Michael and Gabriel or the Deacons Stephen and Lawrence. The newly baptized Tlingit and Serbian gold miners, who were already Orthodox, helped build the traditional structure. It is a high-quality example of the "Russian Colonial" style of architecture. In June 1894, Bishop Nicholas returned to Juneau and consecrated the new church in honor of Saint Nicholas.

On June 5, 2016, Bishop David (Mahaffey), alongside Alaska Governor Bill Walker and First Lady Donna Walker, unveiled a monument at St. Nicholas dedicated to the 881 Aleuts forcibly relocated and interned by the United States during World War II.

== See also ==
- National Register of Historic Places listings in Juneau, Alaska
