= Frances House =

Historic house in Alaska, United States

- The Frances House
- U.S. National Register of Historic Places
- Alaska Heritage Resources Survey
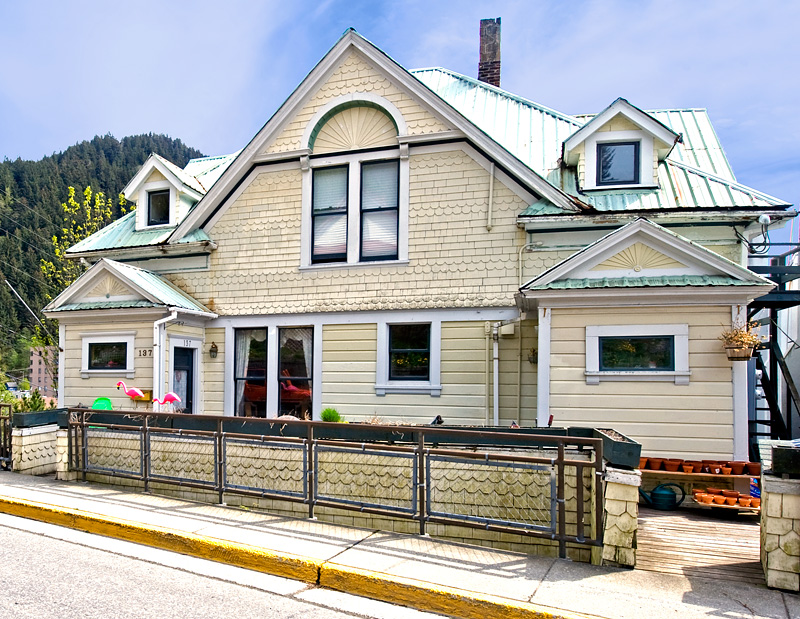

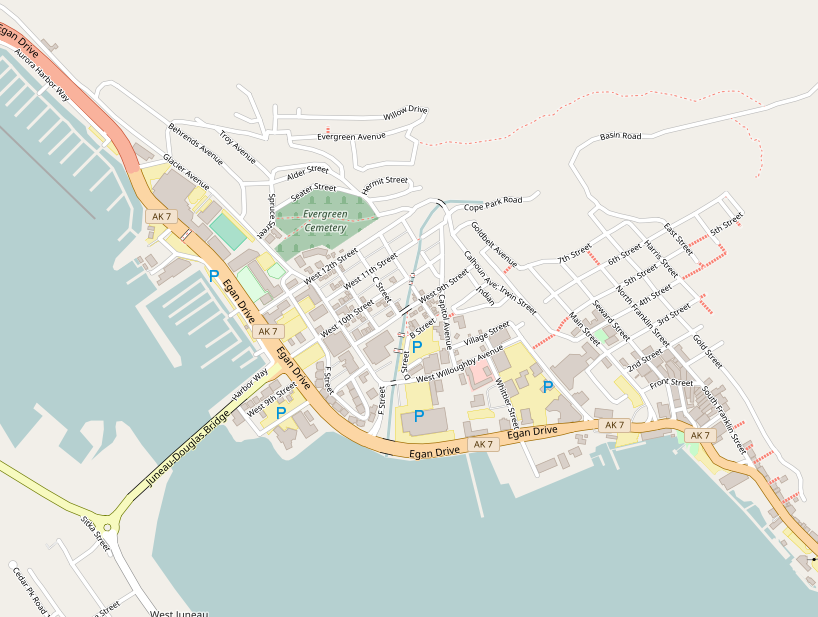
- Location within Juneau Location within Alaska
- Location: 137 6th Street, Juneau, Alaska
- Coordinates: 58°18′10″N 134°24′41″W
- Area: 0.1 acres (0.040 ha)
- Built: 1898
- Built by: Gerald Eicherly
- Architectural style: Queen Anne, Vernacular Queen Anne
- NRHP reference No.: 85001187
- AHRS No.: JUN-076

Significant dates
- Added to NRHP: June 7, 1985
- Designated AHRS: July 26, 1973

The Frances House is a historic house at 137 6th Street in Juneau, Alaska. The three-story wood-frame house was built in 1898 by Jerry Eicherly, then Juneau's postmaster. In 1911 it was purchased by John Rustgard, the Alaska Territory's attorney general, and in 1927 it was rescued from demolition by Frances Davis, a noted painter of Alaskan scenes, from whom the house derives its name. The house is a notable local example of vernacular Queen Anne styling, with a busy roofline, varied siding, and narrow Italianate windows.

The house was listed on the National Register of Historic Places in 1985.

== See also ==
- J. M. Davis House, built by Frances and J. M. Davis
- National Register of Historic Places listings in Juneau, Alaska
