= Nicholas Soraich =

Orthodox Archbishop of Alaska (b. 1949)

His Grace Nicholas
- Former Bishop of Sitka and Alaska
- Installed: March 2002
- Term ended: 13 May 2008
- Predecessor: Gregory (Afonsky)
- Successor: David (Mahaffey)

Orders
- Ordination: August 9, 1970 (diaconate); June 4, 1972 (priesthood)
- Consecration: March 21, 2001

Personal details
- Born: April 9, 1949 (age 77) Butte, Montana
- Denomination: Eastern Orthodox
- Education: Christ the Saviour Seminary

Bishop Nicholas (Nikolai, Russian: Епископ Николай, secular name Nicholas Soraich or Nikola Sorajić, Serbian: Никола Сорајић) is a retired bishop of the Russian Orthodox Church Outside of Russia, former Bishop of Sitka and Alaska (2001 to 2008) within Orthodox Church in America.

== Early life and education ==
Nicholas was born on 9 April 1949 into a Serbian Orthodox family in Butte, Montana, and was baptized on 24 December 1949. After graduating high school in 1967, he enrolled at Christ the Saviour Seminary in Johnstown, Pennsylvania. He was tonsured a monk on 8 August 1970 and ordained into the diaconate the next day. He was ordained into the priesthood on 4 June 1972. His first assignment was to organize a parish in Billings, Montana in the same year. During this time, he also served as a juvenile police officer from 1972 to 1976 and as an associate principal at Billings Central Catholic High School (1976–1978).

From 1978 to 1979, he pursued a graduate degree in Theology and also Rehabilitation Counselling at the Theological Faculty of the Serbian Orthodox Church in Belgrade, Yugoslavia. Upon returning to the United States, he was assigned to establish a new parish in Las Vegas, Nevada to organize a new parish. In 1988, he received a canonical release from the Serbian Orthodox Church and was received into the Orthodox Church in America. The following year, he served as the chairman of the Diocese of the West’s Mission Board, succeeding Bishop Alexander (Golitzin). In August 1994 he was appointed Chancellor of the Diocese of the West until his consecration as bishop. On May 13, 1995, he was elevated to the rank of Archimandrite.

== Bishop ==
On March 21, 2001, he was consecrated as an auxiliary bishop and served first as Bishop of Baltimore, later as auxiliary bishop of Hagerstown, Maryland. He was elected as Bishop of Sitka and Alaska on 31 October 2001 and was installed on 5 March 2002.

From 2007 to 2008, he faced criticism from parishioners for allegedly refusing to baptize infants who were not given traditionally Orthodox names, which offended many Alaskan native members of the diocese. On 13 May 2008 he stepped down after transferring two clergymen to the Serbian Orthodox Church in Australia, which was cited as not being within his power to do (as receptions are approved explicitly by the primate). On 14 March 2014 he was formally released from the Orthodox Church in America to the Russian Orthodox Church Outside of Russia as a retired bishop. He currently serves as rector of All Saints Parish of the ROCOR in Las Vegas.

Eastern Orthodox Church titles
| Preceded by Gregory (Afonsky) | Bishop of Sitka and Alaska; 2001 – 2008 | Succeeded by David (Mahaffey) |
