= Fries Miners' Cabins =

Historic houses in Alaska, United States

- U.S. National Register of Historic Places
- U.S. Historic district
- Alaska Heritage Resources Survey
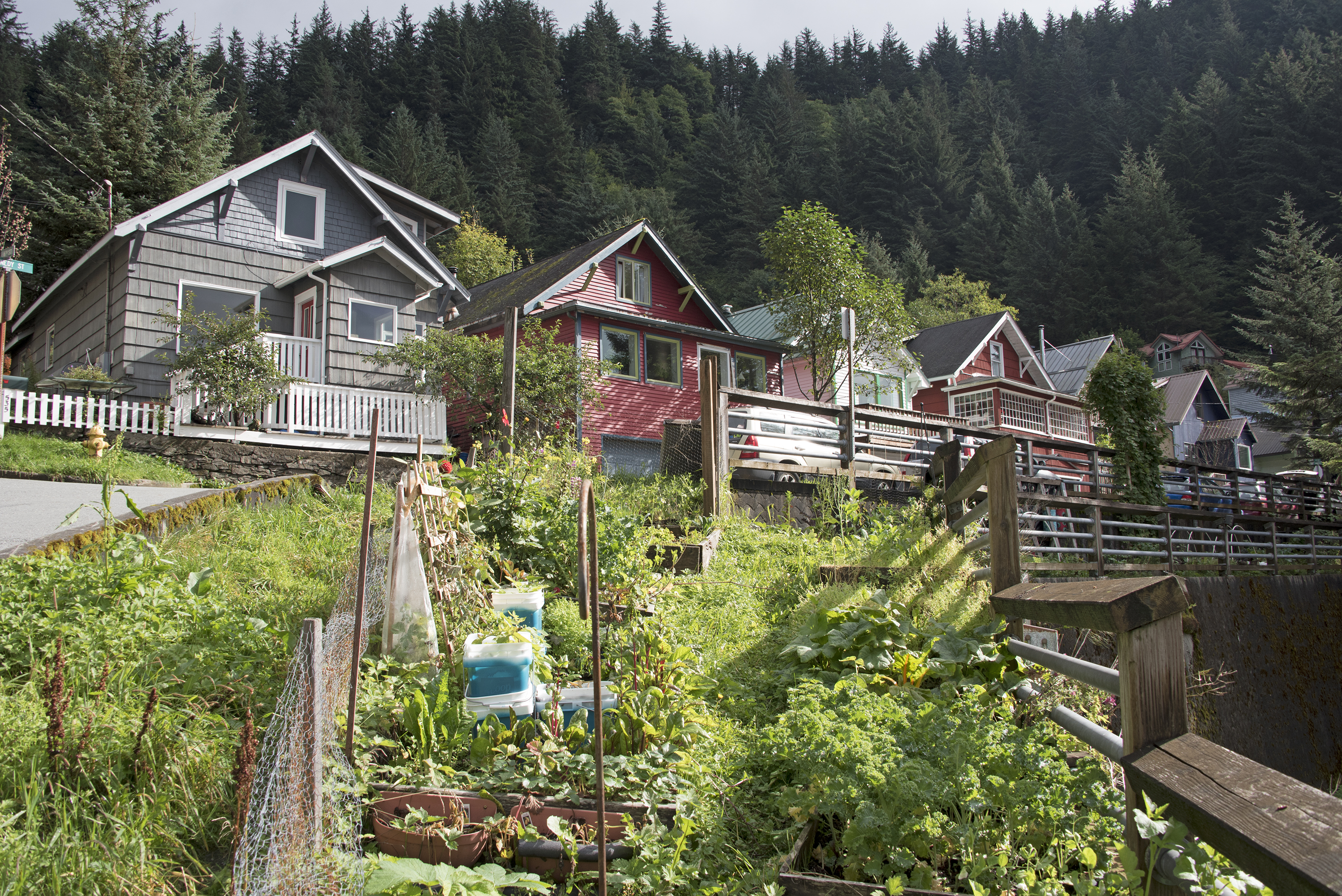

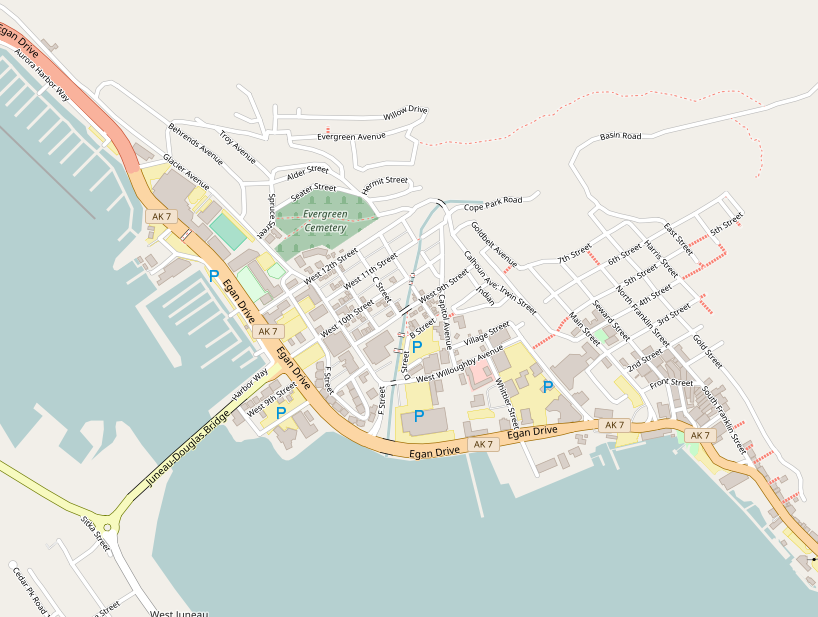
- Location within Juneau Location within Alaska
- Location: 501, 511, 517, 523, 525 and 535 Kennedy Street, Juneau, Alaska
- Coordinates: 58°18′16″N 134°24′20″W
- Area: 4.5 acres (1.8 ha)
- Built: 1913
- Architectural style: Bungalow/craftsman
- NRHP reference No.: 88001347
- AHRS No.: JUN-163; JUN-308; JUN-309; JUN-310; JUN-311; JUN-312
- Added to NRHP: September 8, 1988

The Fries Miners' Cabins are a group of six small houses located on the 500 block of Kennedy Street, in the Starr Hill neighborhood adjacent to downtown Juneau, Alaska. The six were built as essentially identical structures in 1913 to house miners working in the local gold mines. The houses are 1 1/2-story structures of wood-frame construction, and are in the Craftsman style popular at the time. Of the more than 200 miner houses built during Juneau's gold boom, these are among the few that survive.

They are named after Conrad W Fries (1851-1922) who moved to Juneau with his wife Mary (nee Grone) from St Louis, Missouri, wanting to make a new start after their 2 young sons died. Conrad was from Germany and had previously been owner of Fries Brewery in St. Louis.

The six buildings were included in the Fries Miners' Cabins historical district, also known as Kennedy Street Mine Workers Houses and Kennedy Street Historical District, on the National Register of Historic Places in 1988.

== See also ==
- National Register of Historic Places listings in Juneau, Alaska
