= National Register of Historic Places listings in Juneau, Alaska =

Location of Juneau in Alaska

This is a list of the National Register of Historic Places listings in Juneau, Alaska.

This is intended to be a complete list of the properties and districts on the National Register of Historic Places in Juneau, Alaska, United States. The locations of National Register properties and districts for which the latitude and longitude coordinates are included below, may be seen in an online map.

There are 23 properties and districts listed on the National Register in the city and borough, including one National Historic Landmark.

This National Park Service list is complete through NPS recent listings posted July 17, 2026.

== Current listings ==
| | Name on the Register | Image | Date listed | Location | Description |
|---|---|---|---|---|---|
| 1 | Alaska Governor's Mansion | Alaska Governor's Mansion | November 7, 1976 (#76000359) | 716 Calhoun Avenue; 58°22′29″N 134°34′54″W | |
| 2 | Alaska Steam Laundry | Alaska Steam Laundry | February 17, 1978 (#78000527) | 174 South Franklin Street; 58°18′00″N 134°24′19″W | Also a contributing property to Juneau Downtown Historic District. |
| 3 | Alaskan Hotel | Alaskan Hotel | October 25, 1978 (#78000526) | 167 South Franklin Street; 58°18′01″N 134°24′18″W | Also a contributing property to Juneau Downtown Historic District. |
| 4 | Bergmann Hotel | Bergmann Hotel | July 28, 1977 (#77000217) | 434 3rd Street; 58°18′10″N 134°24′22″W | Condemned by city officials March 10, 2017 due to neglected maintenance and insect infestations. |
| 5 | Chicken Ridge Historic District | Chicken Ridge Historic District | October 12, 1995 (#95000420) | Roughly along Seventh Street, Goldbelt Avenue, Dixon Street, and Basin Road; 58°18′14″N 134°24′39″W | |
| 6 | J. M. Davis House | J. M. Davis House | August 31, 1982 (#82002073) | 202 6th Street; 58°18′12″N 134°24′40″W | |
| 7 | Fort Durham Site | | May 5, 1978 (#78000529) | Near Taku Harbor | |
| 8 | The Frances House | The Frances House | June 7, 1985 (#85001187) | 137 Sixth Street; 58°18′10″N 134°24′41″W | |
| 9 | Fries Miners' Cabins | Fries Miners' Cabins | September 8, 1988 (#88001347) | 501, 511, 517, 523, 525 and 535 Kennedy Street; 58°18′16″N 134°24′20″W | |
| 10 | Ernest Gruening Cabin | Ernest Gruening Cabin | June 8, 1992 (#92000633) | 0.5 miles (0.80 km) west of Mile 26 Glacier Highway, northwest of Juneau; 58°29′37″N 134°47′12″W | |
| 11 | Holy Trinity Church | Holy Trinity Church | October 19, 1978 (#78000528) | 325 Gold Street; 58°18′10″N 134°24′25″W | Destroyed by fire March 12, 2006 |
| 12 | Jualpa Mining Camp | Jualpa Mining Camp | August 5, 1993 (#93000733) | 1001 Basin Road; 58°18′24″N 134°23′07″W | Site hosting the Last Chance Mining Museum. |
| 13 | Juneau Downtown Historic District | Juneau Downtown Historic District | June 17, 1994 (#94000603) | Roughly along South Franklin Street and Front Street; 58°17′58″N 134°24′15″W | |
| 14 | Juneau Memorial Library | Juneau Memorial Library | June 7, 2006 (#06000463) | 114 West Fourth Street; 58°18′07″N 134°24′41″W | Building now hosting the Juneau City Museum |
| 15 | MacKinnon Apartments | MacKinnon Apartments | February 24, 2000 (#00000144) | 236 Third Street; 58°18′07″N 134°24′30″W | |
| 16 | Mayflower School | Mayflower School | November 21, 1988 (#88002534) | 750 St Anns Ave., Douglas townsite, Douglas Island; 58°16′31″N 134°23′32″W | Building now hosting the Juneau Montessori School. |
| 17 | Rudy-Kodzoff House | Rudy-Kodzoff House | March 17, 2015 (#15000070) | 2865 Mendenhall Loop Road, C-0; 58°22′29″N 134°34′54″W | |
| 18 | St. Nicholas Russian Orthodox Church | St. Nicholas Russian Orthodox Church | September 19, 1973 (#73000377) | 326 Fifth Street; 58°18′11″N 134°24′33″W | |
| 19 | Sentinel Island Light Station | Sentinel Island Light Station | December 2, 2002 (#02001407) | Sentinel Island; 58°32′47″N 134°55′24″W | |
| 20 | Twin Glacier Camp | Twin Glacier Camp | May 20, 1988 (#88000556) | Along the Taku River; 58°29′26″N 133°56′28″W | Originally a hunting camp, now a tourist destination known as the Taku Glacier Lodge. |
| 21 | Valentine Building | Valentine Building | May 30, 1985 (#85001275) | 202 Front Street; 58°18′03″N 134°24′26″W | Also a contributing property to Juneau Downtown Historic District. |
| 22 | House of Wickersham | House of Wickersham | November 21, 1976 (#76000360) | 213 Seventh Street; 58°18′13″N 134°24′41″W | Also a contributing property to Chicken Ridge Historic District |
| 23 | X'unaxi | X'unaxi | July 7, 2016 (#16000401) | Indian Point; 58°22′38″N 134°41′42″W | AKA Auke Cape and Indian Point |

== See also ==
- List of National Historic Landmarks in Alaska
- National Register of Historic Places listings in Alaska
