= Rudy-Kodzoff House =

Historic house in Alaska, United States

- U.S. National Register of Historic Places
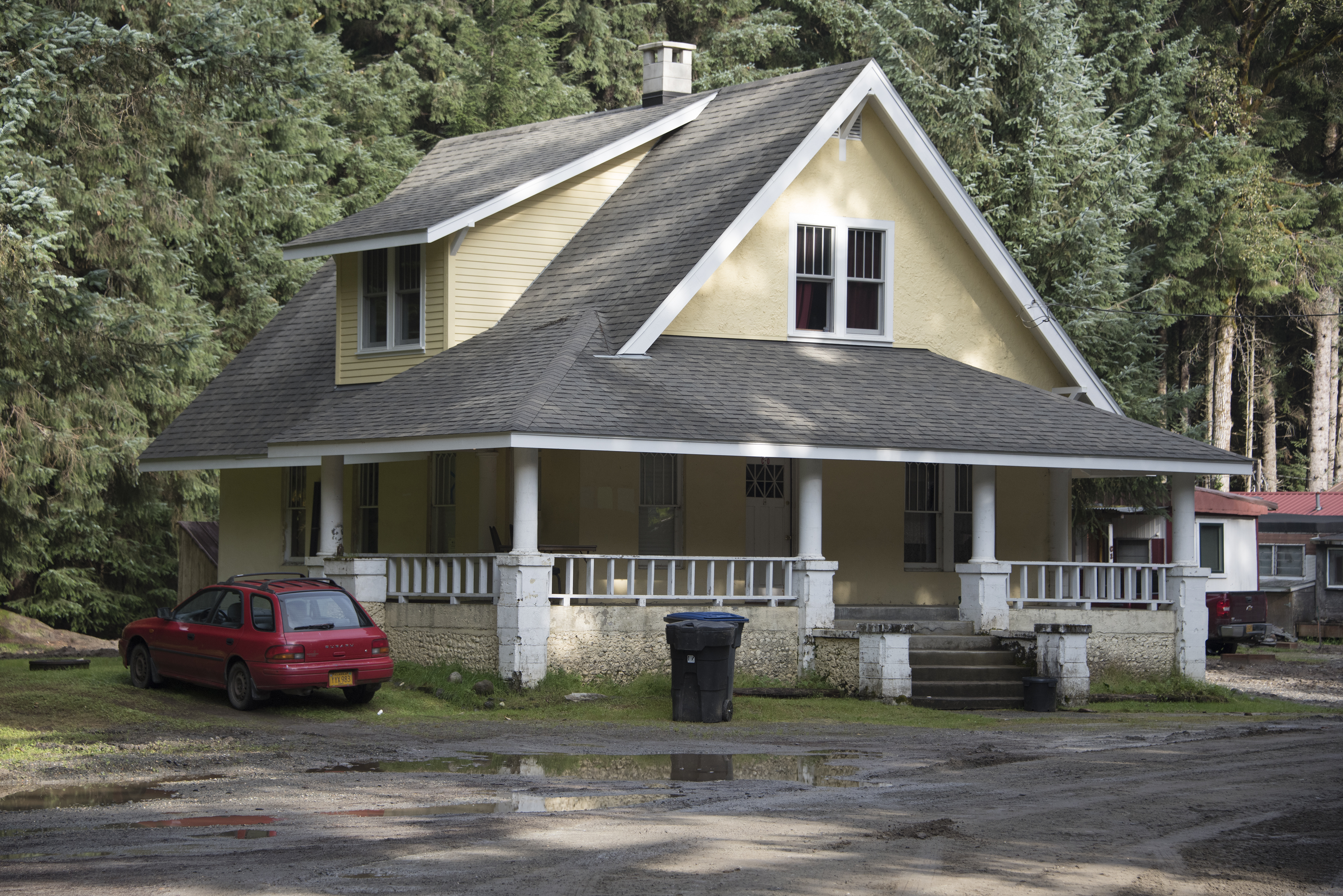

- Location within Alaska
- Interactive map showing the location of Rudy-Kodzoff House
- Location: 2865 Mendenhall Loop Road, C-0, Juneau, Alaska
- Coordinates: 58°22′29″N 134°34′54″W
- Built: 1915
- Built by: Charles Rudy
- Architectural style: Craftsman
- NRHP reference No.: 15000070
- Added to NRHP: March 17, 2015

The Rudy-Kodzoff House is a historic house at 2865 Mendenhall Loop Road in Juneau, Alaska. It is a concrete structure with Craftsman/Bungalow styling, built in 1915 for Charles Rudy, one of the first settlers of the Mendenhall Valley. It is the only surviving building of that period in the valley. It presently houses the offices and owner's residence of a mobile home park developed by Kodzoff family.

The house was listed on the National Register of Historic Places in 2015.

== See also ==
- National Register of Historic Places listings in Juneau, Alaska
