= Chicken Ridge Historic District =

Historic district in Alaska, United States

- U.S. National Register of Historic Places
- U.S. Historic district
- Alaska Heritage Resources Survey
- Location within Alaska

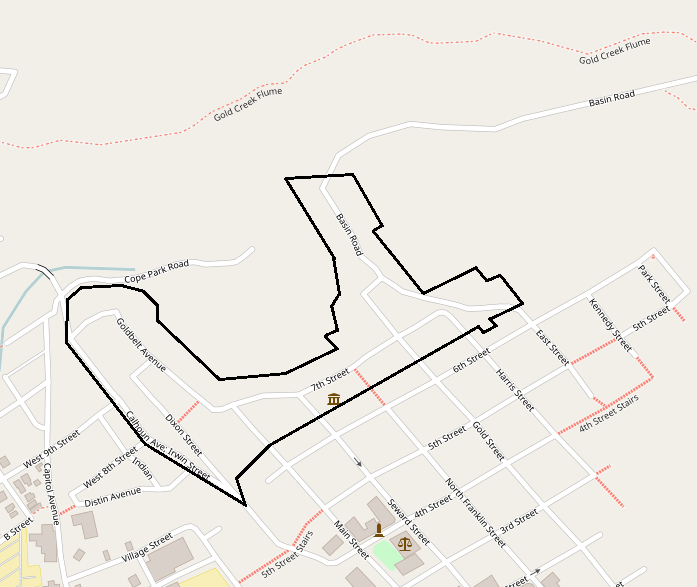
- Boundaries of Chicken Ridge Historic District
- Location: Roughly along Seventh Street, Goldbelt Avenue, Dixon Street and Basin Road, Juneau, Alaska
- Coordinates: 58°18′14″N 134°24′39″W
- Area: 17 acres (6.9 ha)
- Built: 1893
- Architectural style: Bungalow/craftsman, Colonial Revival, Tudor Revival
- NRHP reference No.: 95000420
- AHRS No.: JUN-599
- Added to NRHP: October 12, 1995

The Chicken Ridge Historic District is a residential historic district in Juneau, Alaska. It is located in an area long known as Chicken Ridge (probably for the ptarmigan and grouse found there in abundance), and has since the early 20th century been one of Juneau's finest neighborhoods. It includes properties along Seventh Street, Basin Road above Seventh, Goldbelt Avenue, Dixon Street, and Main Street above Sixth. Most of the district's 75 contributing and 26 non-contributing properties are Craftsman in style, although the Tudor Revival and Colonial Revival are also well represented.

The district was listed on the National Register of Historic Places in 1995. It includes the Wickersham House, which was independently listed on the National Register in 1976 and is now a state historic site and house museum.

== See also ==
- National Register of Historic Places listings in Juneau, Alaska
