= Valentine Building (Juneau, Alaska) =

- U.S. National Register of Historic Places
- U.S. Historic district – Contributing property
- Alaska Heritage Resources Survey
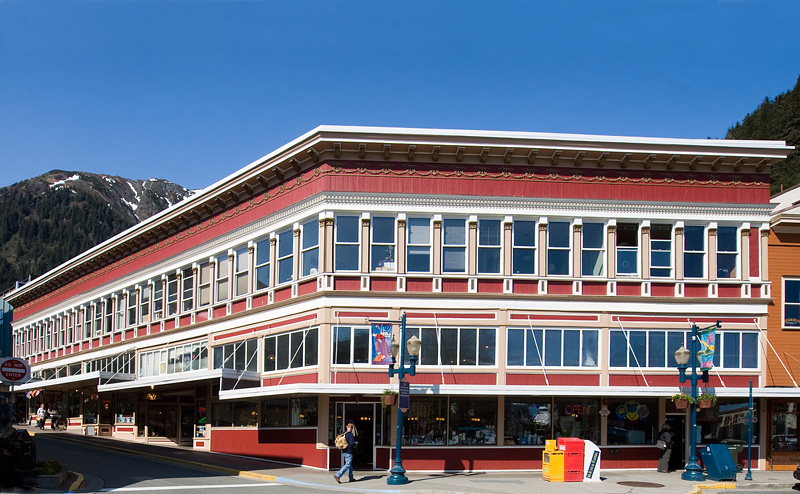

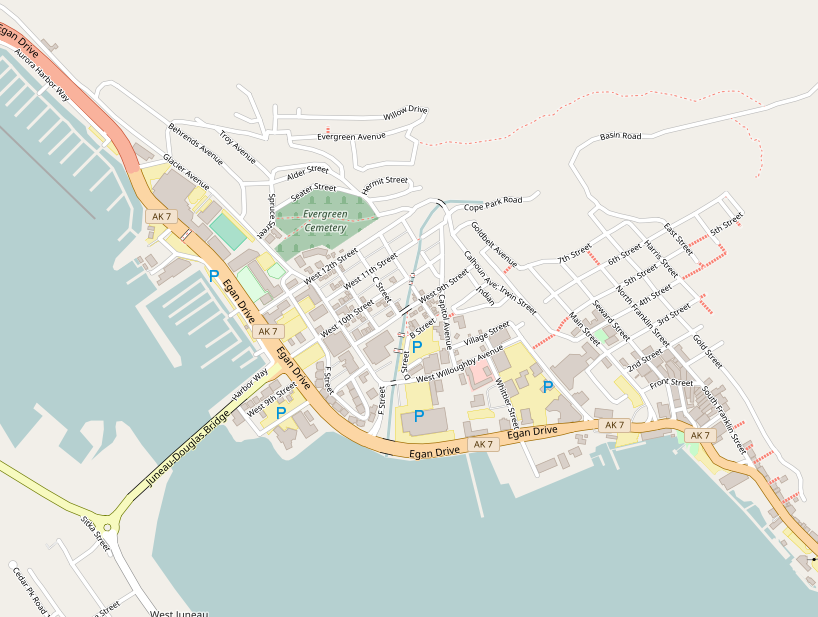
- Location within Juneau Location within Alaska
- Location: 202 Front Street, Juneau, Alaska
- Coordinates: 58°18′3″N 134°24′26″W
- Area: 0.2 acres (0.081 ha)
- Built: 1904
- Built by: C.W. Young
- Architectural style: Frontier Commercial
- Part of: Juneau Downtown Historic District (ID94000603)
- NRHP reference No.: 85001275
- AHRS No.: JUN-123

Significant dates
- Added to NRHP: May 30, 1985
- Designated CP: June 17, 1994
- Designated AHRS: July 21, 1977

The Valentine Building, also known as Valentine's Place and Valentine Business Block, is a historic commercial building at 202 Front Street in Juneau, Alaska. It is a prominent, irregularly-shaped two-story wood-frame structure, occupying an entire five-sided city block in the historic heart of the city. It was built in phases in 1904 and 1912 by Emery Valentine, a prominent local businessman who served as mayor of Juneau for six terms. For the first half of the 20th century, the Valentine building was one of Juneau's preeminent addresses, and the building remains a fine example of Alaskan frontier architecture.

The building was listed on the National Register of Historic Places in 1985 and was included as a contributing property to Juneau Downtown Historic District in 1994.

== See also ==
- National Register of Historic Places listings in Juneau, Alaska
