= MacKinnon Apartments =

- U.S. National Register of Historic Places
- Alaska Heritage Resources Survey
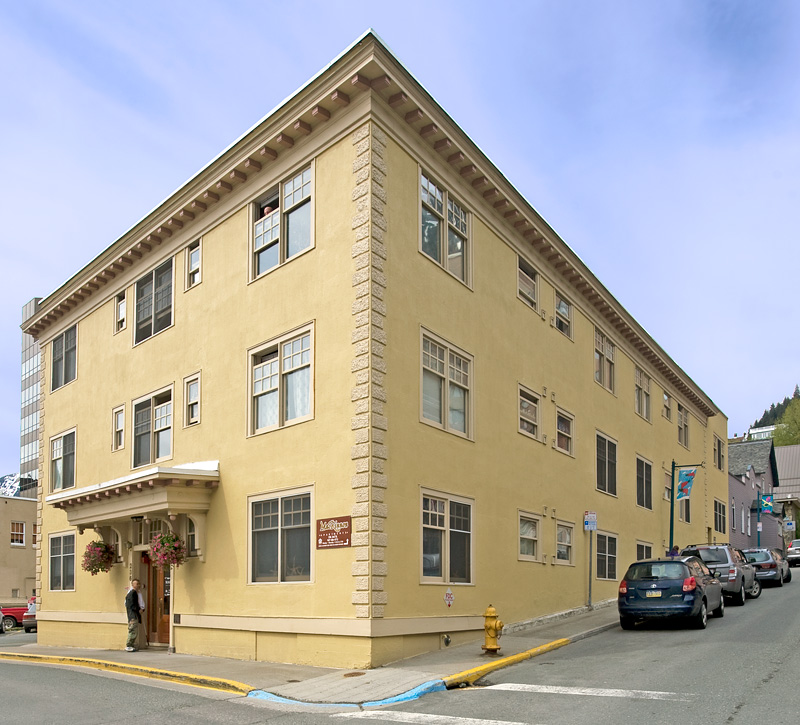
- MacKinnon Apartments, May 2011

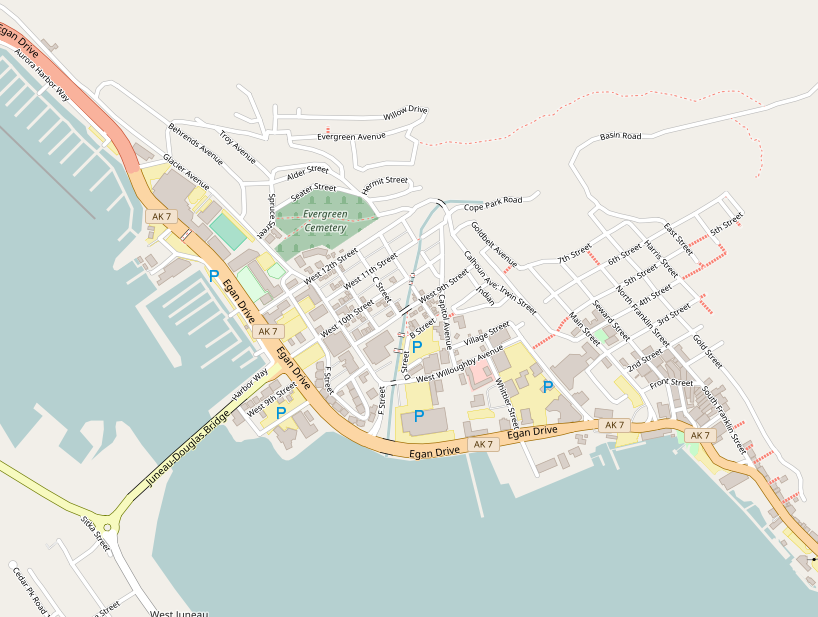
- Location within Juneau Location within Alaska
- Location: 236 Third Street, Juneau, Alaska
- Coordinates: 58°18′7″N 134°24′30″W
- Area: 1 acre (0.40 ha)
- Built: 1925
- Built by: Lauchlin "Lockie" MacKinnon
- NRHP reference No.: 00000144
- AHRS No.: JUN-00194
- Added to NRHP: February 24, 2000

The MacKinnon Apartments is a historic apartment building at 236 Third Street in Juneau, Alaska. The building is a three-story wood-frame structure, finished in stucco; it has corner quoining and a dentillated cornice. When originally built in 1925, it was 80 feet (24 m) long and housed six single-bedroom and 12 studio apartments. In 1959, 20 feet (6.1 m) was added; the extension houses five more studio units.

The building is representative of Juneau's boom years in the 1920s, which was the peak of the Gold Rush. Mackinnon Apartments was listed on the National Register of Historic Places in 2000.

== See also ==
- National Register of Historic Places listings in Juneau, Alaska
