= House of Wickersham (Juneau, Alaska) =

Historic house in Alaska, United States

- U.S. National Register of Historic Places
- U.S. Historic district – Contributing property
- Alaska Heritage Resources Survey
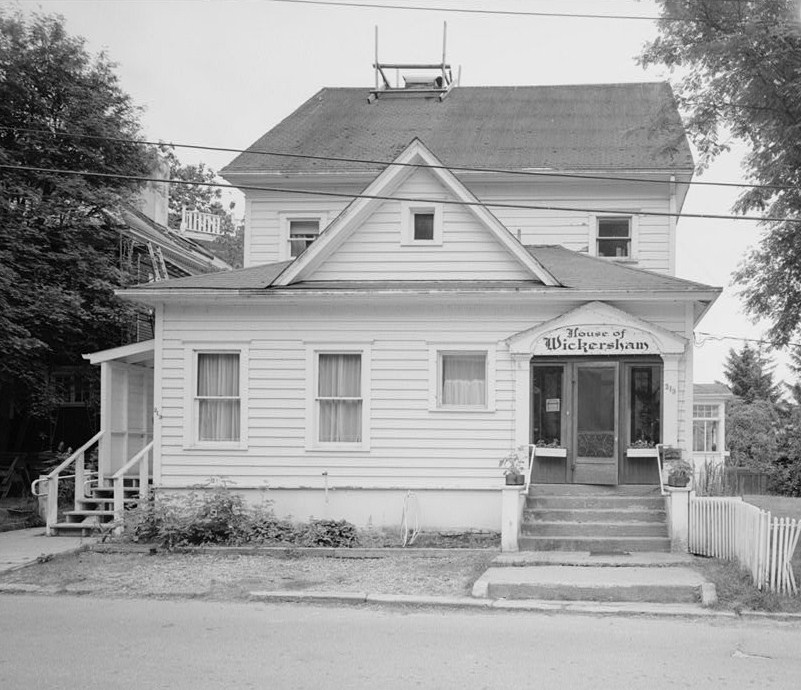

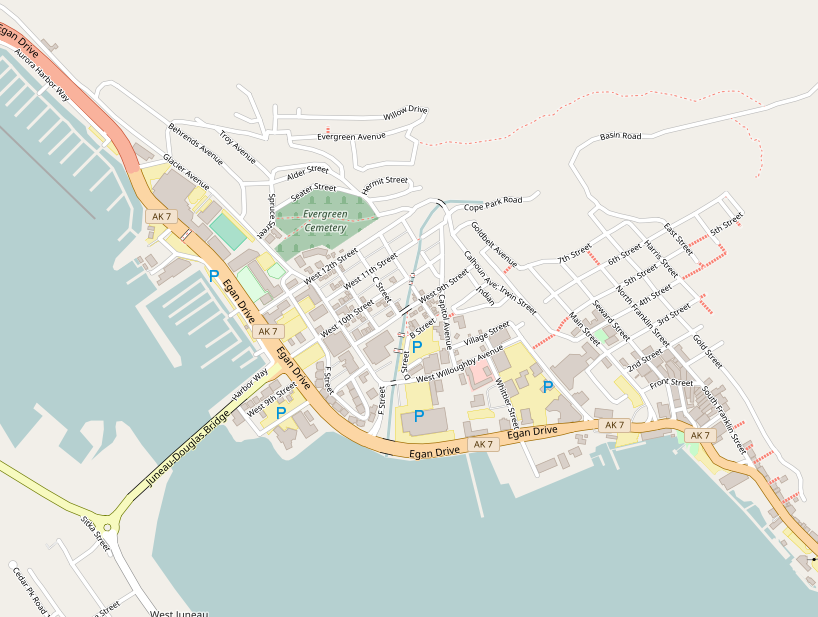
- Location within Juneau Location within Alaska
- Location: 213 Seventh Street, Juneau, Alaska
- Coordinates: 58°18′13″N 134°24′41″W
- Area: 0.6 acres (0.24 ha)
- Built by: Frank Hammond
- Part of: Chicken Ridge Historic District (ID95000420)
- NRHP reference No.: 76000360
- AHRS No.: JUN-021

Significant dates
- Added to NRHP: November 21, 1976
- Designated CP: October 12, 1995
- Designated AHRS: July, 1972

The House of Wickersham, also known as the Wickersham State Historic Site, is a historic house at 213 7th Street in the Chicken Ridge area of Juneau, Alaska, United States. It is a historic house museum operated by the state of Alaska, memorializing the life of James Wickersham (1857-1939), an influential political leader in Alaska in the early 20th century. The house, a 2 1/2-story frame structure, was built in 1899 by Frank Hammond, owner of a mining company. It was purchased by Wickersham in 1928 and remained his home until his death. The house has been operated, informally at first by Wickersham's niece, as a museum since 1958. The house was purchased by the state in 1984.

The house was listed on the National Register of Historic Places in 1976 and was included as a contributing property to Chicken Ridge Historic District in 1995.

== See also ==
- National Register of Historic Places listings in Juneau, Alaska
