= Juneau Downtown Historic District =

Historic district in Alaska, United States

- U.S. National Register of Historic Places
- U.S. Historic district
- Alaska Heritage Resources Survey
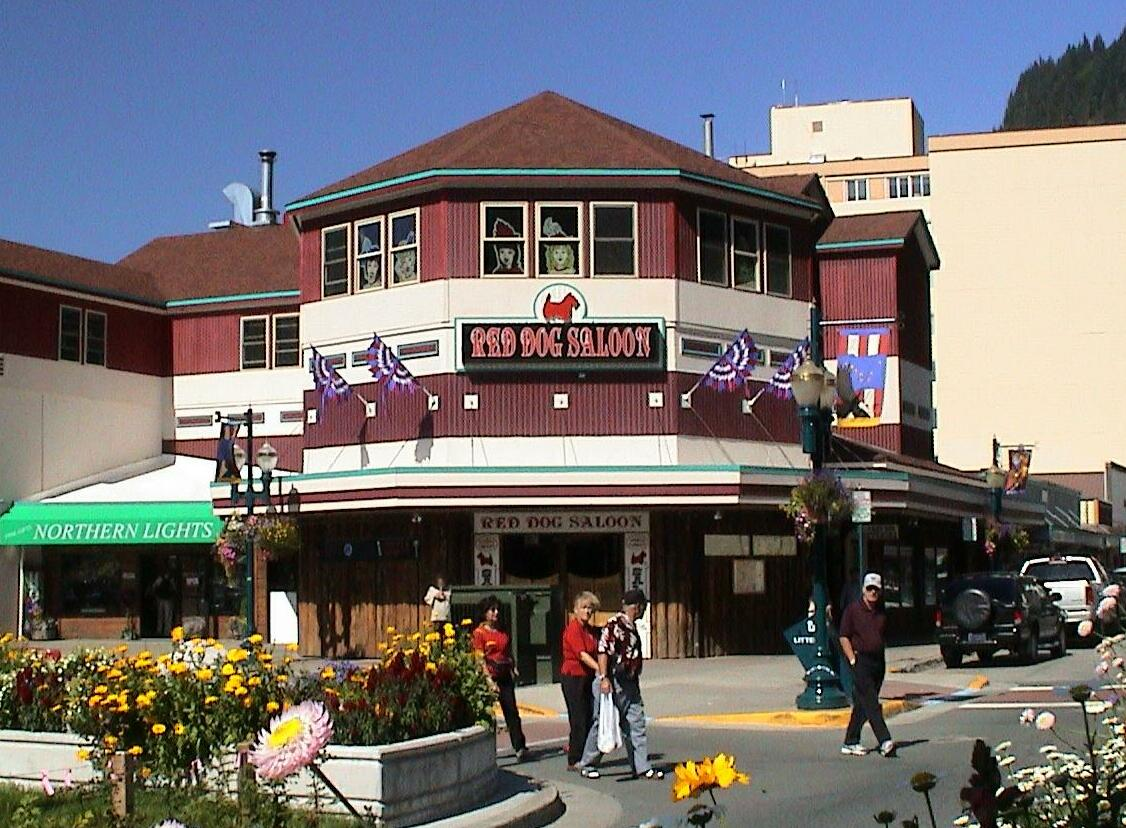
- The Red Dog Saloon

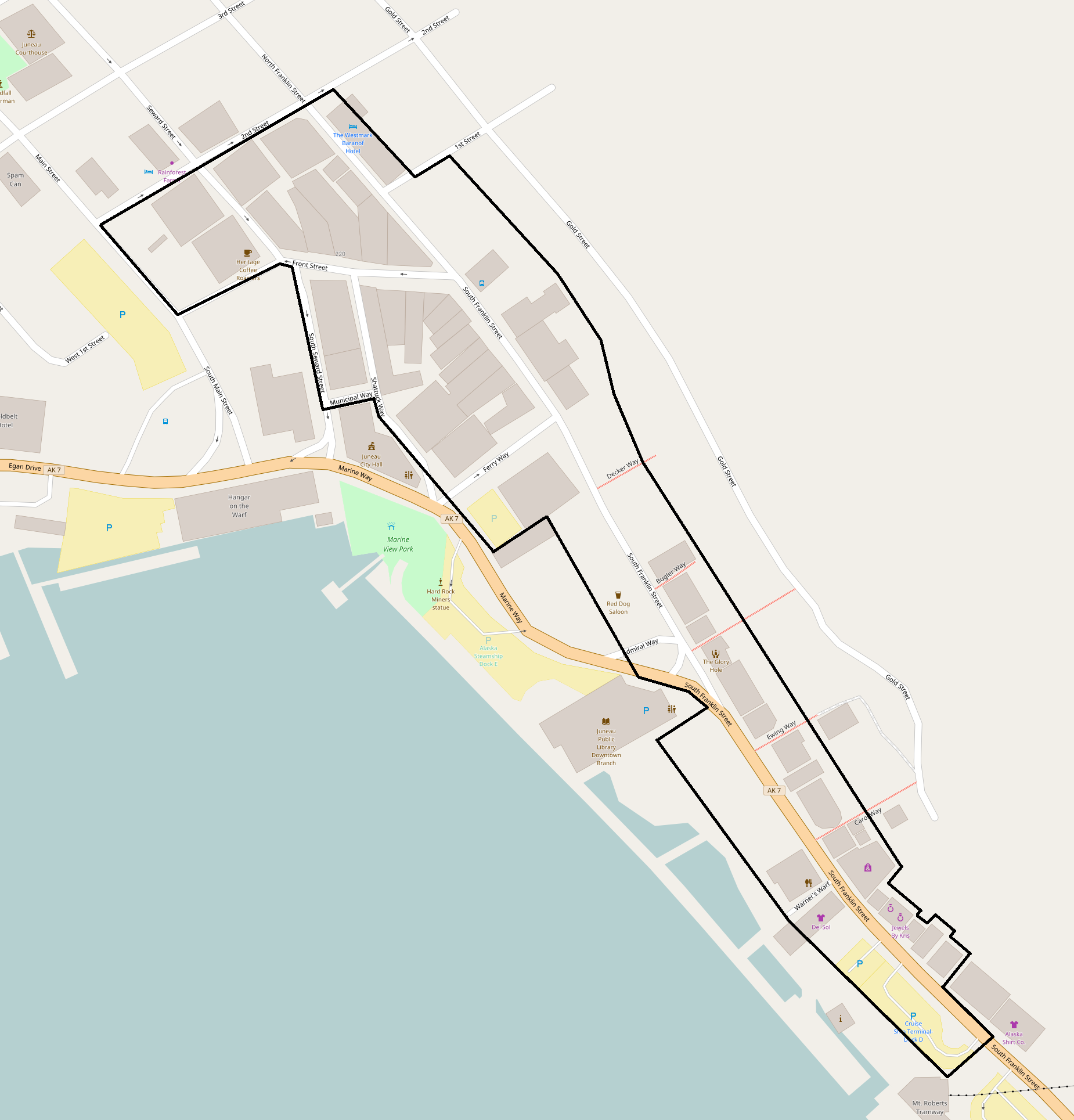
- Location: Along South Franklin Street and Front Street, Juneau, Alaska
- Coordinates: 58°17′58″N 134°24′15″W
- Area: 17 acres (6.9 ha)
- Built: 1889
- Architectural style: Modern Movement, Late 19th And Early 20th Century American Movements, Late Victorian
- NRHP reference No.: 94000603
- AHRS No.: JUN-456
- Added to NRHP: June 17, 1994

The Juneau Downtown Historic District encompasses the historic commercial heart of the city of Juneau, Alaska. It extends along South Franklin Street, from the cruise terminal in the south to Second Street in the north, and westward along Second and Front Streets to Main Street. This area was the center of Juneau's economic activity from its founding in 1880 as a gold mining camp, through its growth into an urbanized area in the early 20th century, including its eventual designation as the territorial capital in 1906. In the early days of the gold mining camp business was centered in the area bounded by Front, Main and South Franklin, with maritime activities in particular eventually extending further south along the shore of the Gastineau Channel by making land using mine tailings. The early buildings have relatively utilitarian architecture, while those of the early 20th century are somewhat more ornate, with Late Victorian details. Notable buildings from this period include the Alaska Steam Laundry (174 S. Franklin) and the Valentine Building (202 Front Street).

The district, comprising 42 contributing properties, was listed on the National Register of Historic Places in 1994.

== See also ==
- National Register of Historic Places listings in Juneau, Alaska
