= Twin Glacier Camp =

- U.S. National Register of Historic Places
- U.S. Historic district
- Alaska Heritage Resources Survey
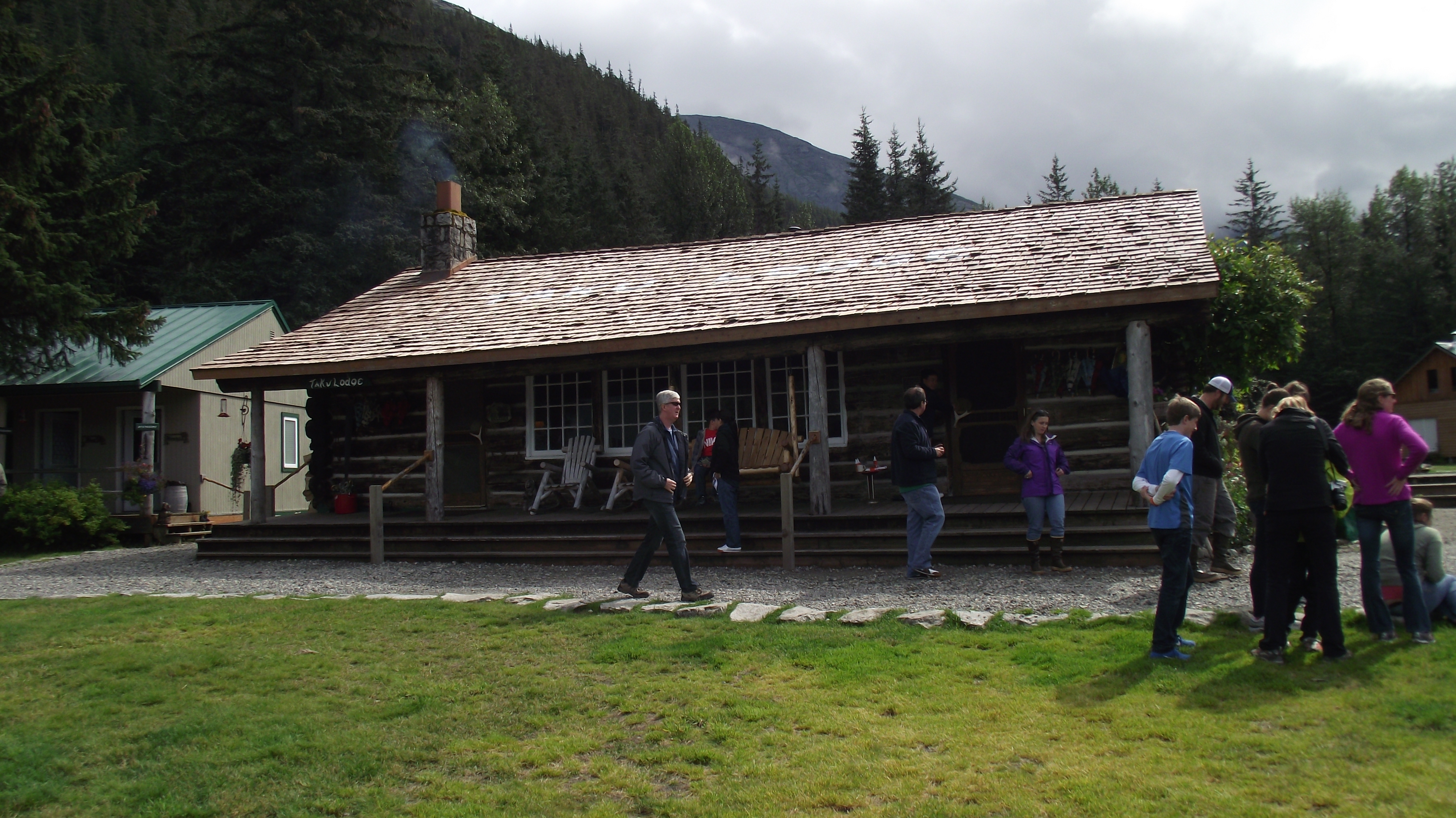

- Location within Alaska
- Location: On southern banks of Taku River, 30 miles (48 km) from Juneau
- Nearest city: Juneau, Alaska
- Coordinates: 58°29′26″N 133°56′28″W
- Area: 11.99 acres (4.85 ha)
- Built: 1923
- Built by: Taku River Trading Company
- Architectural style: Log cabin
- NRHP reference No.: 88000556
- AHRS No.: XTR-017
- Added to NRHP: May 20, 1988

The Twin Glacier Camp, also known as the Twin Glacier Lodge and now Taku Glacier Lodge, is a historic wilderness recreation complex in Juneau Borough, Alaska. It is located on the southern banks of the Taku River, about 30 miles (48 km) from the city of Juneau.

The camp consists of thirteen buildings on 12 acres (4.9 ha), about half of which were built in the first ten years of the camp's existence. The main lodge house is a log and stone structure measuring 40 by 20 feet (12.2 m × 6.1 m).

It is one of the few surviving camps (out of what was once a large number) established in Alaska during the 1920s.

The camp, comprising seven contributing buildings, was listed as an historical district on the National Register of Historic Places in 1988.

== See also ==
- National Register of Historic Places listings in Juneau, Alaska
