= Alexei Trader =

Orthodox Archbishop of Alaska (b. 1965)

His Eminence Alexei The Most Reverend
- Archbishop of Sitka and Alaska
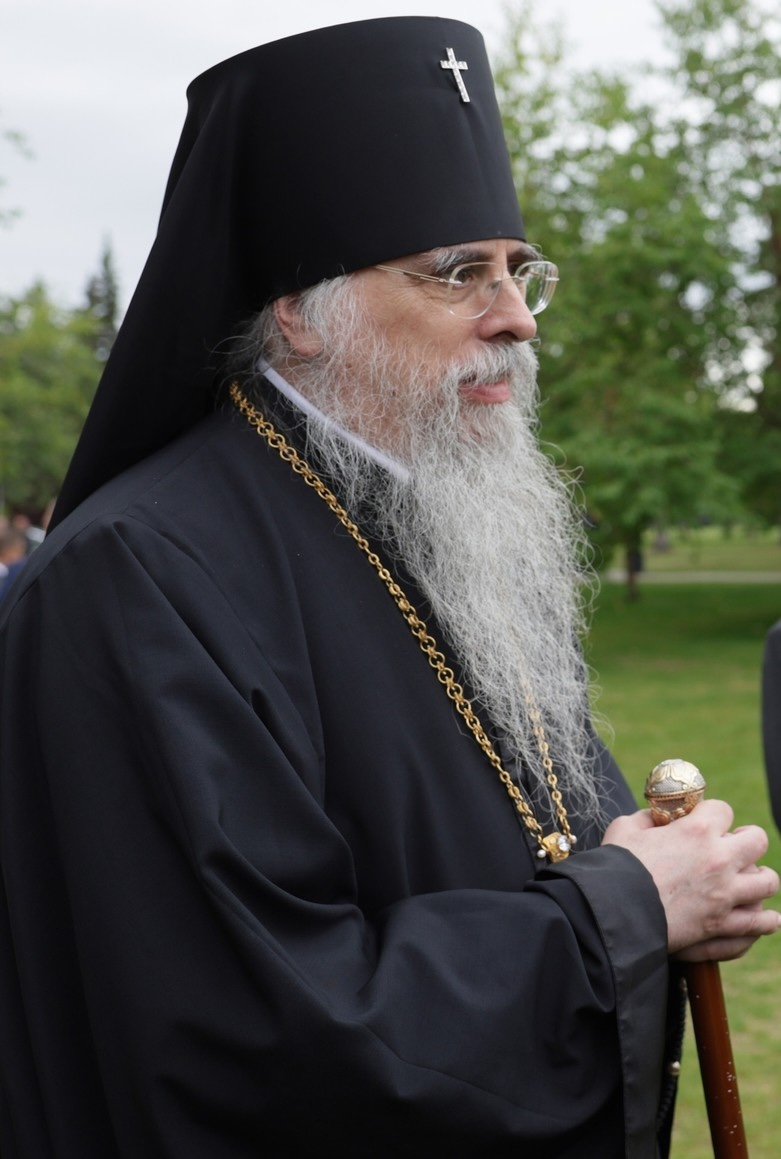
- Archbishop Alexei in 2025
- Archdiocese: Orthodox Church in America Diocese of Alaska
- See: Alaska
- Installed: March 27, 2022
- Term ended: Incumbent
- Predecessor: David (Mahaffey)
- Other post: Bishop of Bethesda

Orders
- Ordination: 1996 (diaconate); 2001 (priesthood)
- Consecration: January 25, 2020

Personal details
- Born: January 31, 1965 (age 61) Dover, Delaware
- Denomination: Eastern Orthodox
- Residence: Saint Tikhon's Orthodox Theological Seminary
- Education: Franklin & Marshall College (BS. Chemistry); University of Chicago (MA. Religious Studies)
- Alma mater: Franklin & Marshall College; University of Chicago; Saint Tikhon's Orthodox Theological Seminary; University of Thessaloniki

Archbishop Alexei (Trader), or Alexis, secular name John Trader (born January 31, 1965) is the Archbishop of the Orthodox Church in America Diocese of Alaska since 2022.

== Early life and education ==
Alexei was born on February 24, 1965, as John Trader in Dover, Delaware. He was raised Methodist; his grandfather was a Methodist pastor. He obtained a bachelor’s degree in chemistry from Franklin & Marshall College and a masters in religion from the University of Chicago. He also obtained a masters of divinity at Saint Tikhon's Orthodox Theological Seminary and a doctorate in patristic studies and psychology from the University of Thessaloniki.

In 1990, Alexei joined Saint Tikhon's Orthodox Monastery as a rasophore, where he also taught courses. In 1995, he went to Greece in Mount Athos to Karakallou Monastery, where he was also known as Alexios Karakallinos (Greek: Αλέξιος Καρακαλλινός). In 1996, he was ordained to the diaconate, to the priesthood in 2001

== Bishop ==
In 2018, Alexei was called back from Greece on invitation from Metropolitan Tikhon in order to serve as bishop. On November 12, 2019, he was elected Bishop of Bethesda, an auxiliary to Metropolitan Tikhon. On January 25, 2020 at Saint Nicholas Cathedral in Washington, DC, he was ordained bishop.

He was elected Bishop of Sitka and Alaska on March 15, 2022, and enthroned on March 27, 2022, at Saint Innocent Cathedral in Anchorage.

He was elevated to the rank of Archbishop on Wednesday, March 19, 2025, at a meeting of the Holy Synod.

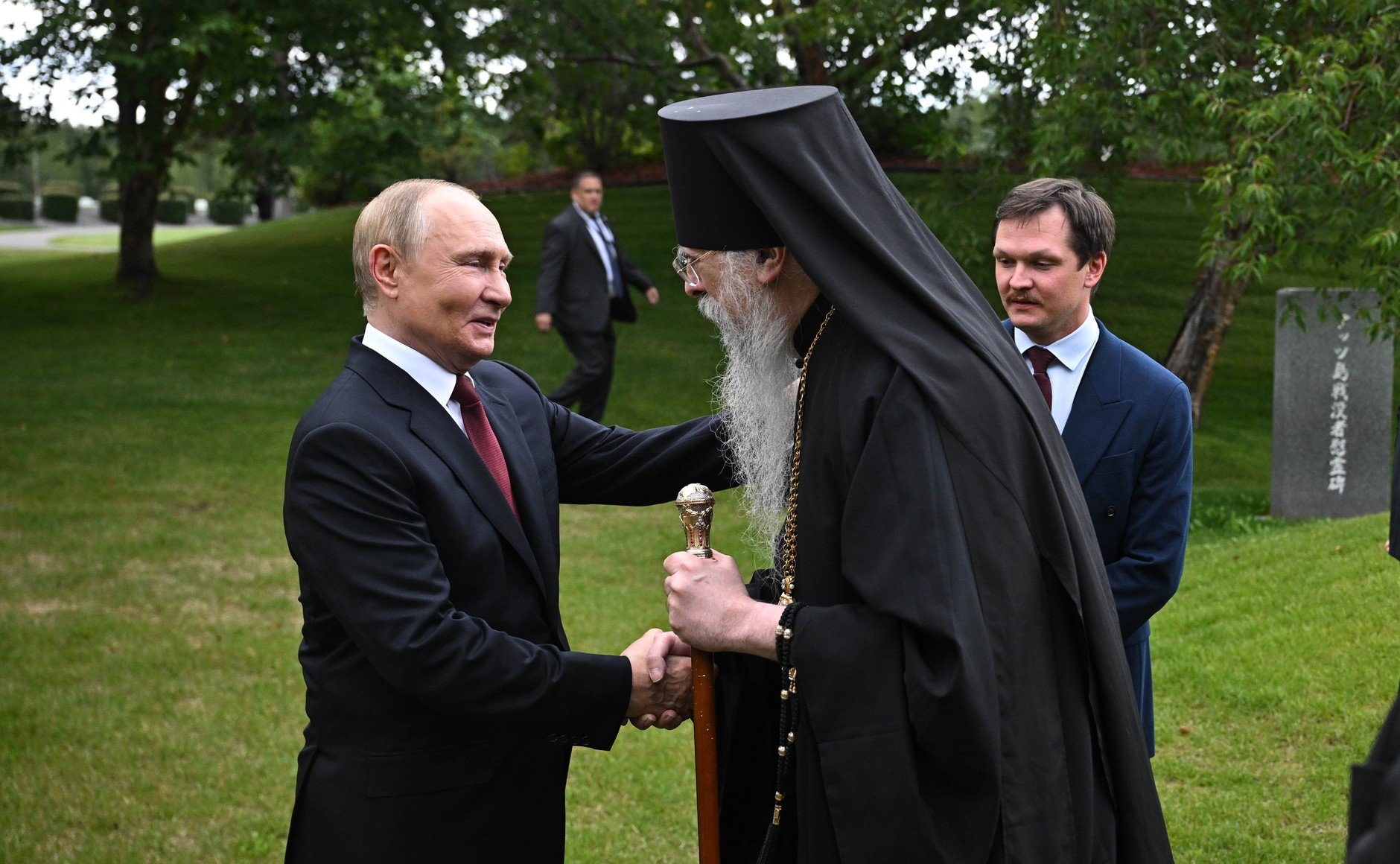
Archbishop Alexei with Vladimir Putin

Alexei publicly met with the Russian president Vladimir Putin on August 15, 2025 as part of the latter's visit to Fort Richardson National Cemetery to pay respects at the graves of Soviet soldiers buried there.

== Bibliography ==
- Trader, Alexis (2002). In Peace Let Us Pray to the Lord: An Orthodox Interpretation of the Gifts of the Spirit. Regina Orthodox Press. ISBN 9781928653066.
- Trader, Alexis (2012). Ancient Christian Wisdom and Aaron Beck’s Cognitive Therapy: A Meeting of Minds (American University Studies) (2 ed.). eter Lang Inc., International Academic Publishers. ISBN 1433121565.
- Καρακαλλινός, Ιερομόναχος Αλέξιος (2012). Θεραπεία της ψυχής, Πατέρες και ψυχολόγοι σε διάλογο (Healing of the Soul: Fathers and Psychologists in Dialogue) (in Greek). Εκδόσεις "Μακρυγιάννης". ISBN 9789605277888.
- Trader, Alexis (2023). Spiritual transformation & giving. Chesterton, Indiana: Ancient Faith Publishing. ISBN 9781955890434.

Eastern Orthodox Church titles
| Preceded by Created | Bishop of Bethesda; 2020 – 2022 | Succeeded by Vacant |
| Preceded by David (Mahaffey) | Bishop of Sitka and Alaska; 2022 – Present | Succeeded by Incumbent |
