= Emery Valentine =

American architect

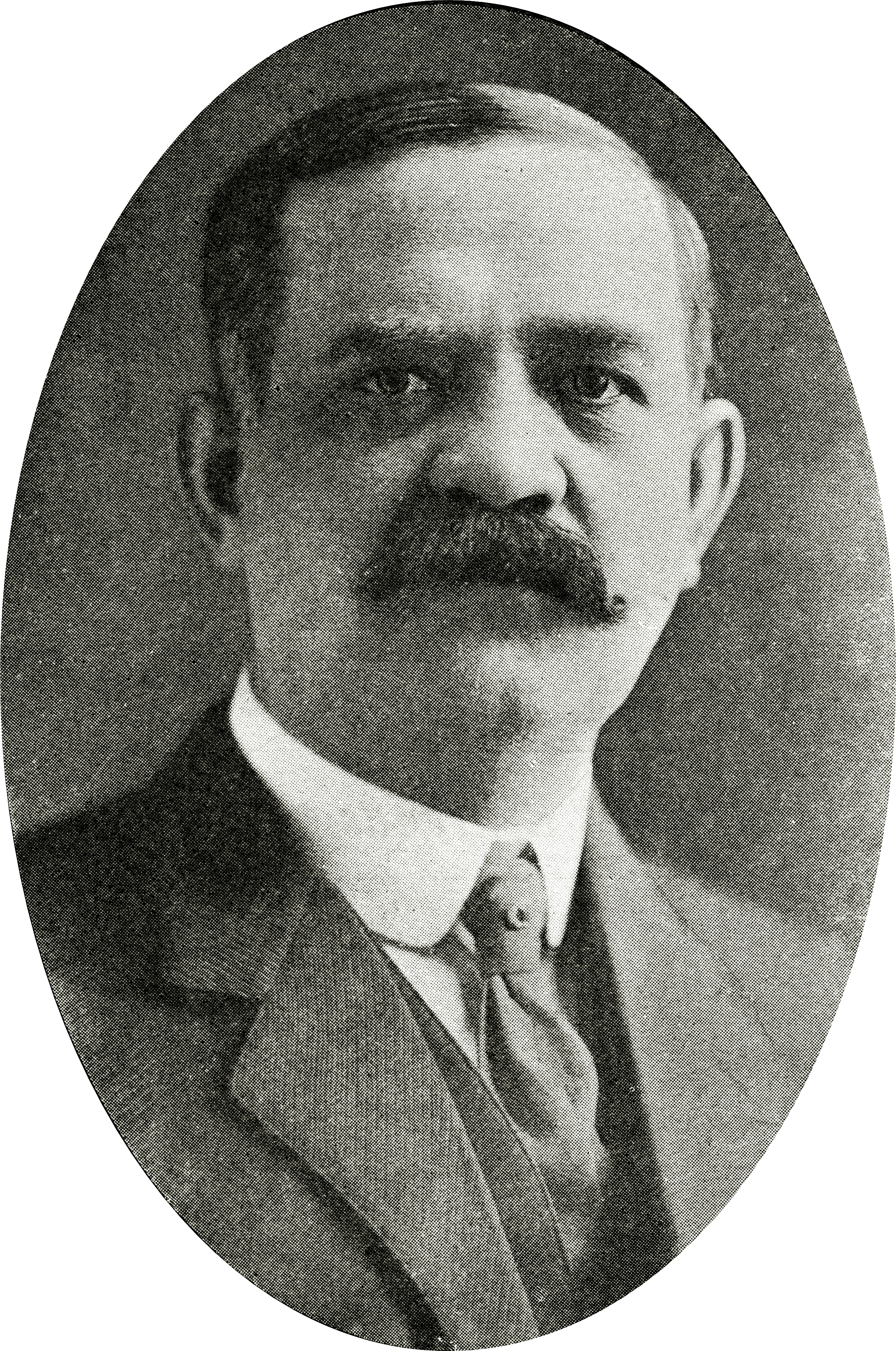

8th mayor of Juneau, Alaska
- In office 1908–1912
- President: Theodore Roosevelt; William Howard Taft
- Governor: Wilford Bacon Hoggatt; Walter Eli Clark
- Preceded by: George F. Forrest
- Succeeded by: Harry A. Bishop
- Constituency: Juneau, Alaska

13th mayor of Juneau, Alaska
- In office 1917–1919
- President: Woodrow Wilson
- Governor: John Franklin Alexander Strong; Thomas Christmas Riggs, Jr.
- Preceded by: B. D. Stewart
- Succeeded by: J. Latimer Gray
- Constituency: Juneau, Alaska

Personal details
- Born: 1858 Dowagiac, Michigan
- Died: September 9, 1930 (aged 71–72) Juneau, Alaska
- Resting place: Evergreen Cemetery, Juneau; 58.3047°N 134.4236°W
- Party: Republican
- Spouse(s): Katherine, Maude, Jennie, Josephine
- Profession: Firefighter, jeweler

Emery (or Emory) Valentine (1858 – September 9, 1930) was an American politician and the sixth mayor of Juneau, Alaska, from 1908 to 1912 and from 1917 to 1919. He was also a miner, goldsmith, jeweller, assayer, gunsmith, watchmaker, architect, firefighter, and businessman.

== Early life ==
Valentine was born in Dowagiac, Michigan. He traveled to Colorado around the age of 10 and became a miner, until he was injured in an accident and lost his leg. He then learned to be a goldsmith and became an apprentice to a jeweler.

== Career ==
Valentine came to own a number of stores throughout Colorado and Montana, from 1876 to 1886, when he left the states and settled in Juneau in May 1886. There, he bought a plot of land from Joe Juneau and began his own jewelry store, E. Valentine Jeweler. He would have built a jewelry store in Skagway, but he faced competition from Herman Kirmse, a well-known jeweler.

=== Architect ===
Emery Valentine built a number of notable buildings in Juneau, including the Valentine Building (now on the National Register of Historic Places), at 119 Seward Street, in 1912, and the Seward Building (now known as Dockside Jewelers), at 145 South Franklin Street. In 1897, he traveled to Skagway, where he built a dock. It was the same dock that local gangster Jefferson Randolph "Soapy" Smith was killed in a gunfight by Frank Reid on July 8, 1898.

=== Firefighter ===
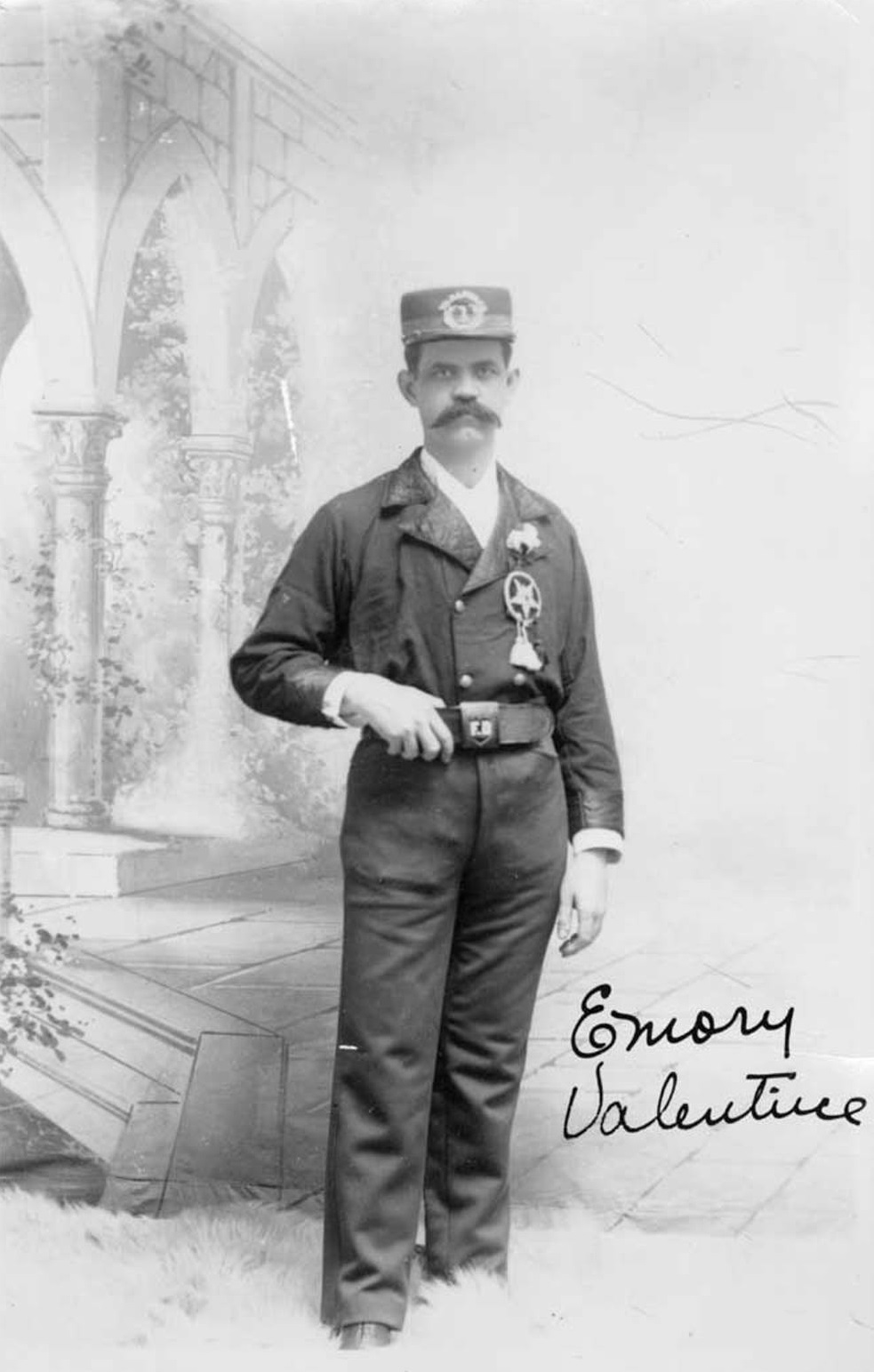
Valentine working as firefighter

After coming to Juneau, Valentine organized the Juneau Volunteer Fire Department. At first, the establishment implemented a horse-drawn cart and a hand pump. Usually, volunteers would form bucket brigades to transport water as well. Valentine also donated a specialized wagon to the department in 1897; the wagon carried the slogan "You ring the Bell and we'll do the rest". As mayor, he renovated the department and designed the city's first water system.

=== Politician ===
Valentine served as a member of the city council for a single term in 1902. During his six terms as mayor, he helped to acquire the People's Dock, near the southern region of the town. Although a Republican, Valentine had close ties with the Progressive ("Bull Moose") Party.

=== Other ===
Valentine also worked as the Japanese vice-consul from 1912 to 1914. For his service to the country of Japan, he was awarded the Order of the Rising Sun.

== Family ==
Emery Valentine was married at least three times:

- Katherine (divorced in Juneau in May 1891)
- Maude Adela Hayford Gough (married October 19, 1900, in Juneau; divorced May 14, 1903)
- Mrs. Frank (Josephine G.) Cook (married December 20, 1909, in Juneau; divorced in Juneau in 1915)

== Later life ==
Valentine was buried in Evergreen Cemetery in Juneau, Alaska.
