= Bibliography of Eastern Orthodoxy in the United States =

The following is a list of sources regarding the history and practice of Eastern Orthodox Christianity in North America.

== History and general ==
- Afonsky, Bp. Gregory. A History of the Orthodox Church in Alaska, 1794-1917. Kodiak: Saint Herman's Theological Seminary Press, 1977. (ISBN B0006CUQ42)
- Afonsky, Bp. Gregory. A History of the Orthodox Church in America, 1917-1934. Kodiak: Saint Herman's Theological Seminary Press, 1994.
- Apostolos, Nicholas K. "Moving Toward an Administratively United Church." St. Vladimir's Theological Quarterly 40, 1-2 (1996): 95–114.
- FitzGerald, Thomas E. The Orthodox Church. Westport, CT: Praeger Publishers, 1998. (ISBN 0275964388)
- Kishkovsky, Leonid. Orthodoxy Today: Tradition or Traditionalism?, 2005.
- Michalopoulos, George C. and Herb Ham. The American Orthodox Church: A History of Its Beginnings. Salisbury: Regina Orthodox Press, 2003. (ISBN 1928653146)
- Moss, Vladimir. The Orthodox Church in the Twentieth Century
- Russian Autocephaly and Orthodoxy in America: An Appraisal with Decisions and Formal Opinions. New York: The Orthodox Observer Press, 1972.
- Surrency, Archim. Serafim. The Quest for Orthodox Church Unity in America: A History of the Orthodox Church in North America in the Twentieth Century. New York: Saints Boris and Gleb Press, 1973.
- Vrame, Anton C., ed. The Orthodox Parish in America: Faithfulness to the Past and Responsibility for the Future. Brookline: Holy Cross Orthodox Press, 2003. (ISBN 1885652704)
- Woerl, Michael. Book Review: A History of the Orthodox Church in America (1917-1934)

== Atlases ==
- Krindatch, Alexei. American Orthodox Christian Churches. Brookline, MA: Holy Cross Orthodox Press, 2011. ISBN 9781935317234
- Krindatch, Alexei. Atlas of American Orthodox Christian Monasteries. Brookline, MA: Holy Cross Orthodox Press, 2016. ISBN 9781935317616

== Jurisdictions ==
=== Antiochian ===
- Corey, George et al., eds. The First One Hundred Years: A Centennial Anthology Celebrating Antiochian Orthodoxy in North America. Englewood: Antakya Press, 1995. (ISBN 0962419028)
- Gabriel, Antony. The Ancient Church on New Shores: Antioch in North America. San Bernardino: St. Willibrord's Press, 1996. (ISBN 0912134275)
- Gillquist, Peter E. Becoming Orthodox: A Journey to the Ancient Christian Faith. Ben Lomond: Conciliar Press, 1992. (ISBN 0962271330)

=== Carpatho-Russian ===
- Barriger, Lawrence. The American Carpatho-Russian Orthodox Greek Catholic Diocese: A History and Chronology. San Bernardino: St. Willibrord's Press, 1999. (ISBN 0912134216)
- Barriger, Lawrence. Glory to Jesus Christ!: History of the American Carpatho-Russian Orthodox Church. Brookline: Holy Cross Orthodox Press, 2000. (ISBN 1885652445)
- Barriger, Lawrence. Good Victory: Metropolitan Orestes Chornock and the American Carpatho-Russian Orthodox Greek Catholic Diocese. Brookline: Holy Cross Orthodox Press, 1985. (ISBN 0917651138)

=== Greek ===
- Coucouzis, Abp. Iakovos. The Greek Orthodox priest as a leader in America. New York: Greek Orthodox Archiocese of North and South America. Dept. of Interchurch Relations and Social Concerns, 1976. (ISBN B0007313BU)
- Efthimiou, Miltiades B., et al., eds. History of the Greek Orthodox Church in America. New York: Greek Orthodox Archdiocese of North and South America, 1984.
- Manolis, Paul. The History of the Greek Church in America: In Acts and Documents. Berkeley: Ambelos Press, 2003. (ISBN 0972437304)
- Papaioannou, George. From Mars Hill to Manhattan: The Greek Orthodox in America under Athenagoras I. Minneapolis: Light and Life, 1976.

=== Orthodox Church in America (OCA) ===
- Bogolepov, Alexander A. Toward an American Orthodox Church: The Establishment of an Autocephalous Orthodox Church. New York: Morehouse-Barlow Company, 1963.
- Liberovsky, Alexis. All-American Sobors and Councils.
- Ramet, Pedro, ed. Eastern Christianity and Politics in the Twentieth Century. Durham and London: Duke University Press, 1988, pp. 116–134.
- Smith, Barbara. Orthodoxy and Native Americans: The Alaskan Mission. Syosset, NY: Orthodox Church in America, Dept. of History and Archives, 1980.
- Stokoe, Mark and Leonid Kishkovsky. Orthodox Christians in North America 1794 - 1994

=== Russian Orthodox Church Outside Russia (ROCOR) ===
- Budzilovich, P.N. A Summary-View of the Three Previous ROCA Sobors, 2000
- Holy Transfiguration Monastery. A History of the Russian Church Abroad and the events leading to the American Metropolia's autocephaly, 1917-1971. Seattle: Saint Nectarios Press, 1972. (ISBN 0913026042)
- Maximovitch, St. John. History of the Russian Orthodox Church Abroad (from The Orthodox Word, 1971)
- Ramet, Pedro, ed. Eastern Christianity and Politics in the Twentieth Century. Durham and London: Duke University Press, 1988, pp. 135–145.
- Rodzianko, M. The Truth About the Russian Church Abroad, 1954 (tr. 1975)
- Young, Alexey. The Russian Orthodox Church Outside Russia: A History and Chronology. San Bernardino: St. Willibrord's Press, 1993. (ISBN 0809523000)

=== Romanian ===
- Hategan, Vasile. Fifty years of the Romanian Orthodox Church in America. Jackson, MI: Romanian Orthodox Episcopate of America, 1959.

=== Serbian ===
- Vuković, Sava (1998). History of the Serbian Orthodox Church in America and Canada 1891–1941. Kragujevac: Kalenić.

== Biography ==
- Chamberas, Peter A., ed. Bishop Gerasimos of Abydos: The Spiritual Elder of America. Brookline: Holy Cross Orthodox Press, 1997. (ISBN 1885652046)
- Christensen, Damascene. Father Seraphim Rose: His Life and Works. Platina: St. Xenia Skete Press, 2003. (ISBN 1887904077)
- Christensen, Damascene. Not of This World: The Life and Teaching of Fr. Seraphim Rose. Forestville: Fr. Seraphim Rose Foundation, 1993. (ISBN 0-938635-52-2)
- Frangouli-Argyris, Justine. The Lonely Path of Integrity (Spyridon, Archbishop of America, 1996-1999). Athens: Exandas Publishers, 2000. (ISBN 9602564911)
- Ofiesh, Mariam Namey . Archbishop Aftimios Ofiesh (1880-1966): A Biography Revealing His Contribution to Orthodoxy and Christendom. Sun City West, AZ: Abihider Co., 1999. (ISBN 0966090810)

This article incorporates text from Bibliography of Eastern Orthodoxy in the United States at OrthodoxWiki which is licensed under the CC-BY-SA and GFDL.
