= Alaska Steam Laundry =

- U.S. National Register of Historic Places
- U.S. Historic district – Contributing property
- Alaska Heritage Resources Survey
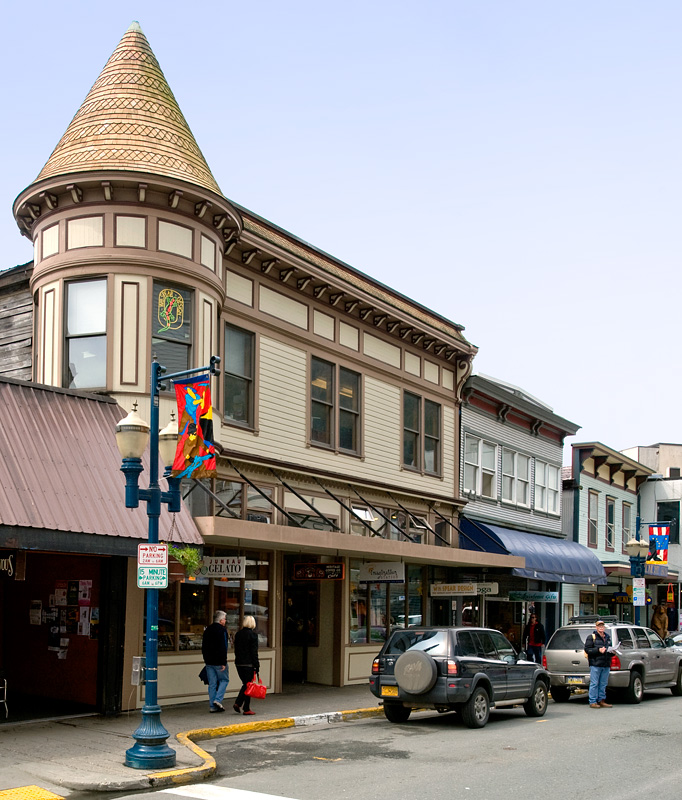

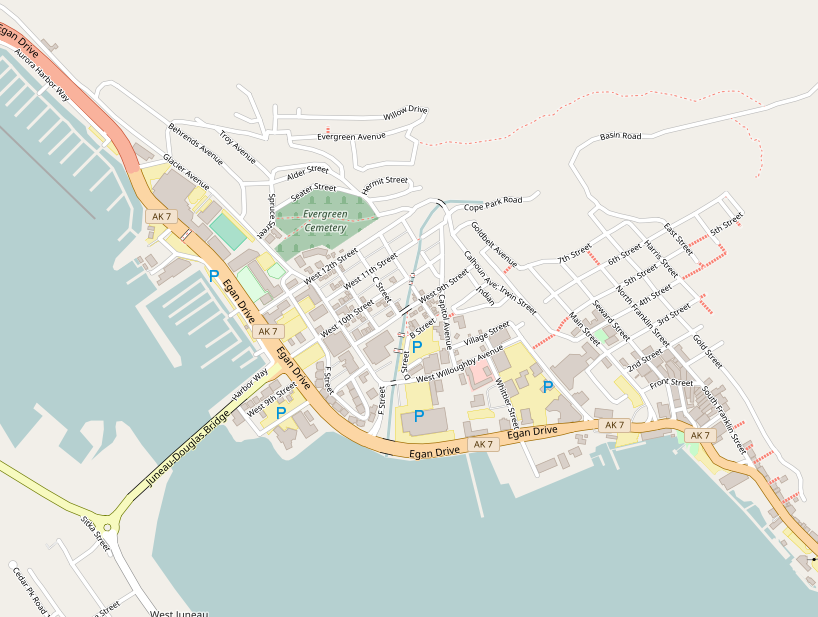
- Location within Juneau Location within Alaska
- Location: 174 South Franklin Street, Juneau, Alaska
- Coordinates: 58°18′0″N 134°24′19″W
- Area: less than one acre
- Built: 1901
- Built by: E.R. Jaeger
- Architectural style: Late Victorian
- Part of: Juneau Downtown Historic District (ID94000603)
- NRHP reference No.: 78000527
- AHRS No.: JUN-018

Significant dates
- Added to NRHP: February 17, 1978
- Designated CP: June 17, 1994
- Designated AHRS: June 15, 1976

The Alaska Steam Laundry is a historic commercial building at 174 South Franklin Street in Juneau, Alaska. It is a Late Victorian wood-frame structure, with a prominent turret that has a conical roof. Built in 1901, it is a well-preserved element of the transition of Juneau from a mining camp to a more cosmopolitan city (it was named the territorial capital in 1900). It was built by E. R. Jaeger, who envisioned the laundry as a profitable business serving single miners working the nearby gold mines. The laundry facilities were housed on the ground floor, with residences and office space above. The laundry operated here until 1929, when it was moved to new premises in the city, and this building was converted to other commercial uses.

The building was listed on the National Register of Historic Places in 1978 and was included as a contributing property to Juneau Downtown Historic District in 1994.

== See also ==
- National Register of Historic Places listings in Juneau, Alaska
