= Bergmann Hotel =

Historic building in Juneau, Alaska

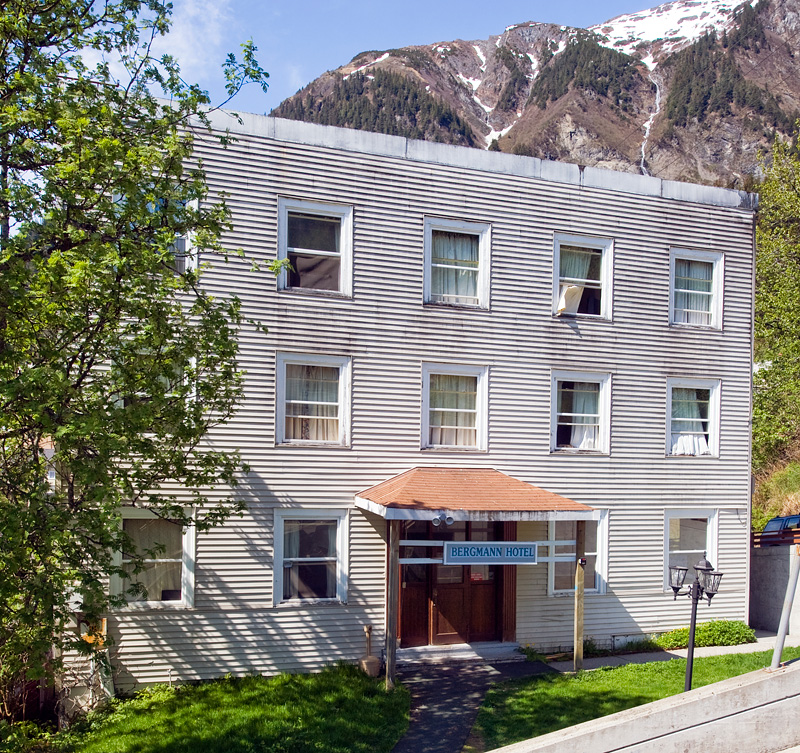
- The Bergmann Hotel, seen here in better times, on May 11, 2011

General information
- Location: 434 3rd Street, Juneau, Alaska
- Coordinates: 58°18′10″N 134°24′22″W
- Opening: December 16, 1913
- Closed: March 10, 2017

Technical details
- Floor count: 3

Other information
- Number of rooms: 42
- Number of suites: 0
- Number of restaurants: 1 (closed)
- Bergmann Hotel
- U.S. National Register of Historic Places
- Alaska Heritage Resources Survey
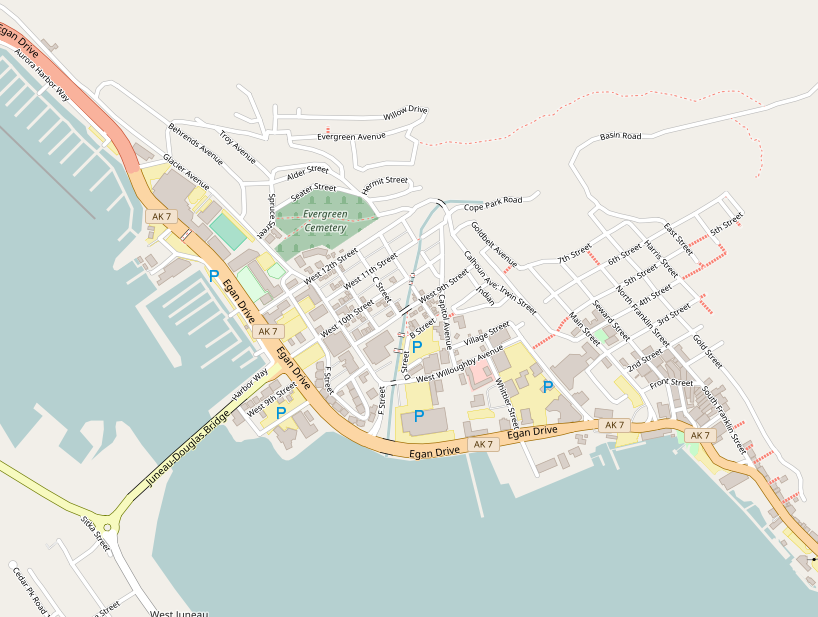
- Location within Juneau Location within Alaska
- Location: 434 3rd Street, Juneau, Alaska
- Coordinates: 58°18′10″N 134°24′22″W
- Area: less than one acre
- Built: 1913
- Built by: Marie E. Bergmann
- NRHP reference No.: 77000217
- AHRS No.: JUN-018

Significant dates
- Added to NRHP: July 28, 1977
- Designated AHRS: 1975

The Bergmann Hotel is a historic hotel located at 434 3rd Street in Juneau, Alaska. It is listed on the National Register of Historic Places.

== Marie Bergmann and Early History of the Hotel ==
The hotel was constructed by Marie E. Bergmann to cater to local miners. According to a biography of the property and Ms. Bergmann maintained by the National Register of Historic Places, Ms. Bergmann settled in the Juneau area in 1896, after the death of her husband in Seattle.

A pioneer in pre-statehood Alaska, Bergmann was an established name in the Juneau hotel business of the period. Marie Bergmann began her professional life in Juneau by working in the hotel industry as well as nursing. Ms. Bergmann originally envisioned a larger, more opulent hotel—but without additional investors and financing she was forced to scale back her plans. The grand opening of the hotel occurred on December 16, 1913. Marie Bergmann died in 1918 of a reported brain hemorrhage.

The building was listed on the National Register of Historic Places in 1978.

== Modern role ==
Although listed as a hotel, the building served primarily as miners housing, with most occupants renting rooms by the week or month. Rooms in the Bergmann did not contain kitchens, although all contained sinks. Restroom, shower and laundry facilities were shared. There are three toilets and three shower facilities per floor. Laundry and microwave facilities are on each floor. The hotel has been owned since 2001 by Camilla Barrett and James M. Barrett esq.(until 2017 for health reasons).

== See also ==
- National Register of Historic Places listings in Juneau, Alaska
