= Ernest Gruening Cabin =

Historic house in Alaska, United States

- U.S. National Register of Historic Places
- Alaska Heritage Resources Survey
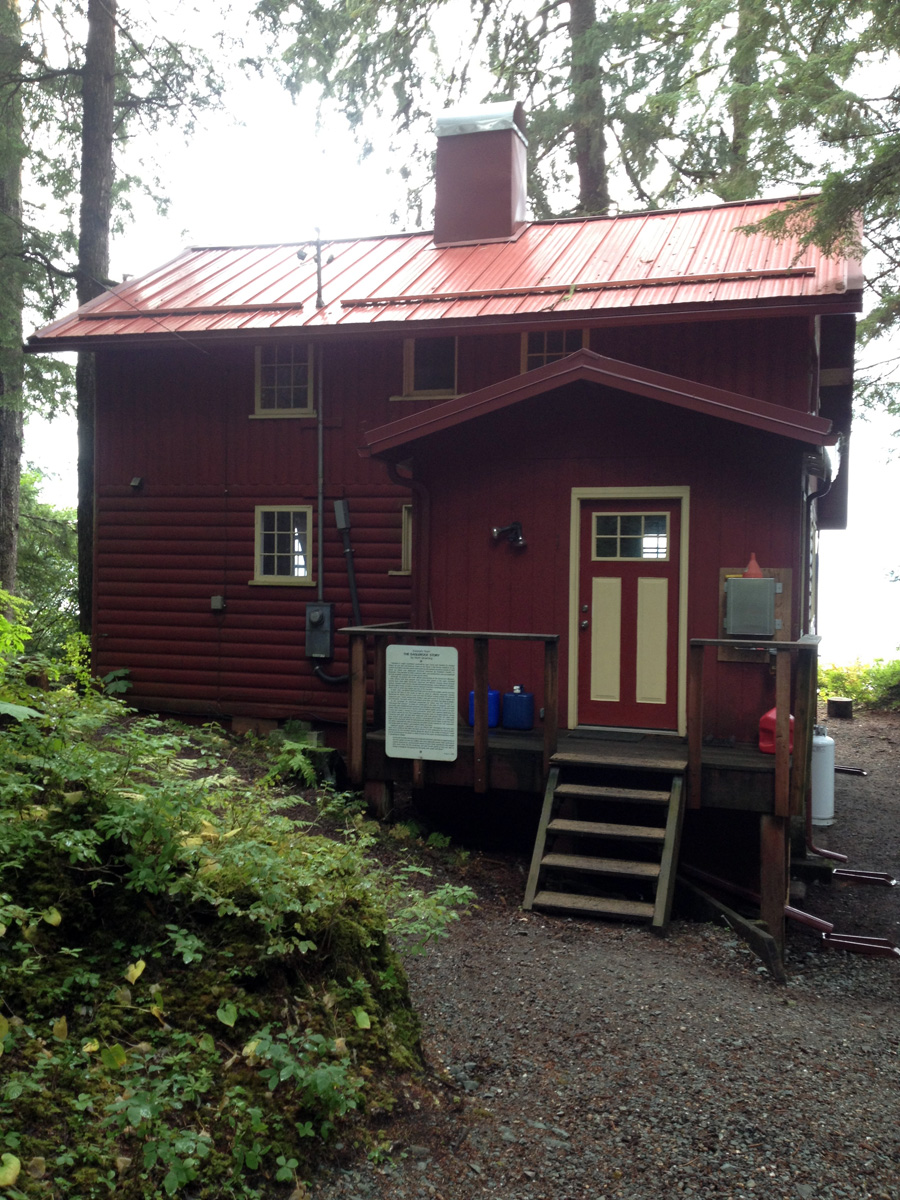

- Location within Alaska
- Location: 0.5 miles (0.80 km) west of Mile 26 Glacier Highway
- Nearest city: Juneau, Alaska
- Coordinates: 58°29′37″N 134°47′12″W
- Area: 1 acre (0.40 ha)
- Built: 1947
- Built by: Fred Jacobsen; Hunt Gruening
- Architect: Malcom MacKay
- NRHP reference No.: 92000633
- AHRS No.: JUN-119
- Added to NRHP: June 8, 1992

The Ernest Gruening Cabin is a historic rural cabin in Juneau, Alaska, United States, and the centerpiece of Ernest Gruening State Historical Park. It is a 1 1/2-story wood-frame structure located 26 miles (42 km) north of the city on the Glacier Highway. It is the only building associated with the life of Ernest Gruening, governor of the Alaska Territory 1939–53, other than the Alaska Governor's Mansion. The cabin was built on land Gruening leased (and later purchased) from the United States Forest Service, and was built by local laborers including Gruening's son Hunt. The cabin measures 24 feet (7.3 m) by 28 feet (8.5 m), with a gable roof and a large fieldstone chimney. Its exterior is finished in shiplap siding milled to resemble unfinished logs. The interior consists of a single large chamber, with a circular stairway leading to a sleeping loft above. The kitchen area is set apart from the rest of the space by different flooring, an alteration by Gruening's grandson. The property is now a state historic site.

The cabin was listed on the National Register of Historic Places in 1992.

== See also ==
- National Register of Historic Places listings in Juneau, Alaska
