= J. M. Davis House =

Historic house in Alaska, United States

- U.S. National Register of Historic Places
- Alaska Heritage Resources Survey
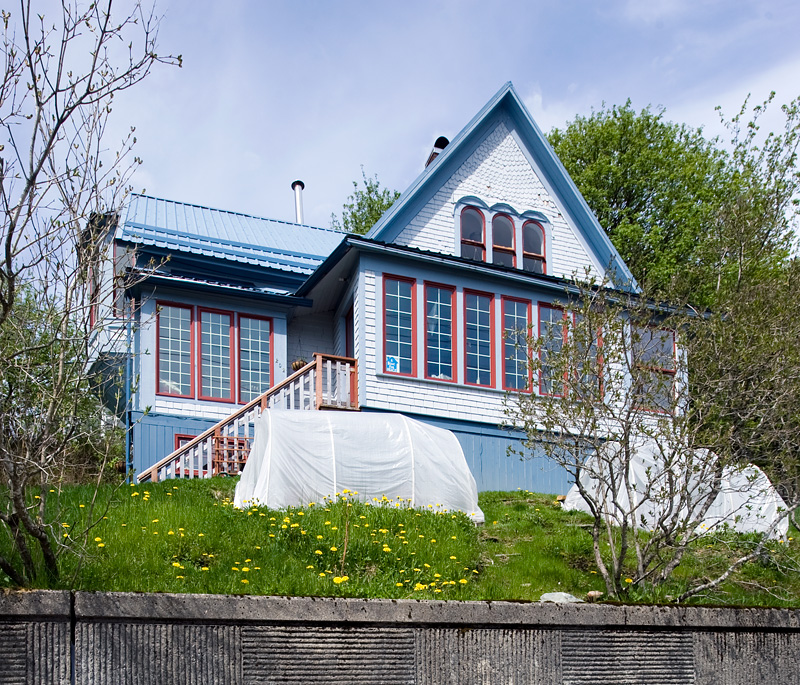

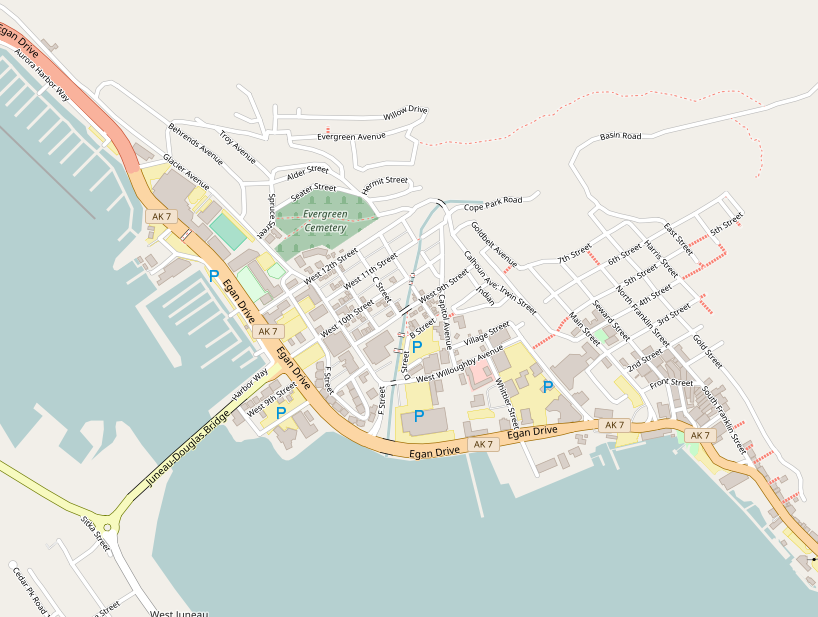
- Location within Juneau Location within Alaska
- Location: 202 6th Street, Juneau, Alaska
- Coordinates: 58°18′12″N 134°24′40″W
- Area: 0.3 acres (0.12 ha)
- Built: 1892
- Built by: J.M. Davis
- NRHP reference No.: 82002073
- AHRS No.: JUN-078

Significant dates
- Added to NRHP: August 31, 1982
- Designated AHRS: July 27, 1973

The J. M. Davis House is a historic house at 202 6th Street in Juneau, Alaska. This two-story wood-frame house was built in 1892, when Juneau was little more than a gold mining camp, and remains one of its most elegant homes of the period, as well as one of its oldest buildings. The builder, J. M. Davis, was a miner whose wife was a wealthy English artist. Their son, Trevor Davis, was a noted Alaskan landscape photographer; the house has also served as the official residence of the local US Coast Guard Admiral.

The house was listed on the National Register of Historic Places in 1982.

== See also ==
- National Register of Historic Places listings in Juneau, Alaska
