= Gregory Afonsky =

Archbishop of Sitka and Alaska (1925 – 2008)

Archbishop Gregory (secular name George Sergeyevich Afonsky, Russian: Георгий Серге́евич Афонский; April 17, 1925 – April 15, 2008) was the Archbishop of Sitka and Alaska from 1973 to 1995. He was also an author of books on Theology and Eastern Orthodoxy in North America writing in both Russian and English.

He was a key figure in the establishment and elevation of what is now St. Herman's Orthodox Theological Seminary, and served as episcopal moderator of the Department of History and Archives and chairman of the Canonization Commission for the Orthodox Church in America.

== Early life ==
He was born George Sergeievich Afonsky in Kiev, Ukrainian SSR, to Archpriest Sergei and Matushka Vera Afonsky, as one of five other children: Boris, Ariadna, Michael, Nina, and Sergei. George's maternal grandfather was Russian New Martyr and Priest Michael Jedlinsky.

Because of religious persecution, times were dangerous for the Afonsky-Jedlinsky family. At one point, George's father was the only functioning priest in Kyiv, with his mother single-handedly baking all the prosphora and George carrying them to church with his siblings. In 1937, his grandfather was executed during the Soviet anti-religious campaigns.

With the advent of the Second World War and subsequent occupation of Ukraine by Axis troops, George was separated from his family at 17 and taken by the Nazis to work in a labor camp. After the War, in 1949, he received his bachelor's degree from the Real Gymnasium of Wendling, Austria, and emigrated to the United States to live with his uncle, noted religious composer and conductor Nicholas P. Afonsky.

== America ==
George began serving as choir conductor and psalm-reader for various Orthodox parishes in the New Jersey-Connecticut area. Graduating from Hofstra University, George entered St. Vladimir's Orthodox Theological Seminary, from which he graduated in 1965. In the same year, he was ordained as a deacon, then elevated to Priest, and was assigned to the St. Sergius Chapel at the Metropolitan's Chancery in Syosset, New York, functioning also as Church archivist until 1971. Continuing his education, Fr. George received first a bachelor's, and then a master's degree in theology from St. Sergius Seminary (in 1968 and 1970, respectively); and at the same time a Master of Arts from Hofstra with a candidacy in theology.

In 1971, Fr. George was sent to St. Nicholas Church in Portland, Oregon as rector. In 1973, he was elected Bishop to the Diocese of Sitka and Alaska. He became a tonsured monk at St. Tikhon Orthodox Monastery, becoming renamed for St. Gregory the Theologian, and quickly elevated therefrom to the ranks of Archpriest and then Archmandrite.

== Alaska ==
Archmandrite Gregory was sent to Juneau and then Kenai, where he was introduced to the Diocesan Council and St. Herman's Pastoral School established a year earlier by Archpriest Joseph P. Kreta and Archpriest Paul Merculief. Consecration took place at St. Michael's Cathedral on May 13 in Sitka by Metropolitan Ireney (Bekish), Archbishop Kiprian (Borisevich), and Bishop Theodosius (Lazor), along with most of the 17 priests of the Diocese. It was the first time a bishop was consecrated in Alaska, and also for Alaska. The event was broadcast on statewide radio.

Bishop Gregory was key in the growth of St. Herman's Pastoral School, moving it soon to Kodiak, and by 1976 it being elevated to a Theological Seminary. Throughout his term as Alaskan Hierarch, Bishop Gregory taught in the Seminary as a professor of Alaska Church History, Dogmatic Theology, and Canon Law.

He served an important role in revitalizing the local Orthodox community, attending the annual Kushkokwim and Yukon Conferences, and later the to-be-established Nushagak and Iliamna Conferences as well. Within four years of his ordination, Bishop Gregory had visited all of the 87 parishes and communities, making sure to travel to at least 10-15 each year. By 1993, he had ordained 25 priests, 5 deacons, tonsured various readers, and established new parishes via the construction of new churches and chapels or the replacement of old ones. He believed his Episcopacy in Alaska to be a gift from God, saying he had no other life but that dedicated to the Orthodox Church in Alaska.

After the dissolution of the Soviet Union, Bishop Gregory was reunited with his brother Sergei, still living in Kyiv, and gained the possibility to travel to both Ukraine and Russia. On March 23, 1995, he was elevated to the rank of Archbishop by the Holy Synod, but on July 20 he retired due to failing health, leaving his post as the longest-reigning hierarch of the Alaskan Diocese. He spent his final years living in Jackson Township, New Jersey, living amongst the Russian-American Community of the Nativity of the Holy Virgin Church.

== Death ==
After a period of declining health, Archbishop Gregory died on April 15, 2008, a couple of days before his 83rd birthday. The next day a memorial service was held in Sitka by Bishop Nikolai (Soraich), and a Litany of Requiem was performed during the Liturgy of the Presanctified Gifts in the Church of St. Catherine the Great Martyr in-the-Fields in the Zamoskvorechie suburb of Moscow by Archmandrite Zacchaeus (Wood) and Priest Vadim Leonov.

The Archbishop's funeral services were presided over by Rector Archpriest John Prokopiuk, along with Bishop Tikhon (Mollard) of Philadelphia and Eastern Pennsylvania on the evening of the 18th, and by Metropolitan Herman (Swaiko) of All America and Canada for interment on the 19th, the holiday of Lazarus Saturday. Also present were clergy and faithful of the Archbishop's former Alaskan flock. He is buried in the surrounding St. Vladimir's Russian Orthodox Cemetery, to the left of the church and behind the former grave site of Russian Civil War hero General Anton Ivanovich Denikin.

== Selected bibliography ==
- Православное учение о епископе: догматическое, святоотеческое, каноническое (1968) (as Fr. George Afonsky)
- A History of the Orthodox Church in Alaska, 1794-1917 (1977)
- A History of the Orthodox Church in America, 1917-1934 (1994)
- Christ and the Church: In Orthodox Teaching and Tradition (2001)
  - Иисус Христос и Его Церковь (2002)
- Введение в Каноническое Право Православной Церкви: по учению отечественной канонической школы XIX-XX веков (2001)

== See also ==
- Orthodox Church in America
- Bibliography of Eastern Orthodoxy in America
