= Starr Hill, Juneau =

Coordinates: 58°18′15″N 134°24′15″W

Starr Hill is a populated place in Juneau, Alaska, United States. It is named for Frank Starr (1849-1898), a soldier from Maine who arrived shortly after the discovery of the Juneau gold fields in 1880, staked some claims but mainly found work in construction. Starr also staked land on the hill near the road leading to the Silver Bow Basin gold fields. The Hill saw significant development beginning in 1913 when Conrad Fries (d. 1922) built six miners’ cabins on the 500 block of Kennedy Street, buildings which are now listed on the National Register of Historic Places. A few years later Juneau businessman Bernard (B.M.) Behrends (b. 1862) built five smaller cabins on the 400 block of Kennedy. Starr Hill now includes several dozen private homes which overlook upper Juneau and the Alaska State Capitol, and a trailhead to the Mount Roberts Trail.
