= David Mahaffey =

Orthodox Archbishop of Alaska

His Grace David The Right Reverend
- Bishop of Sitka and Alaska
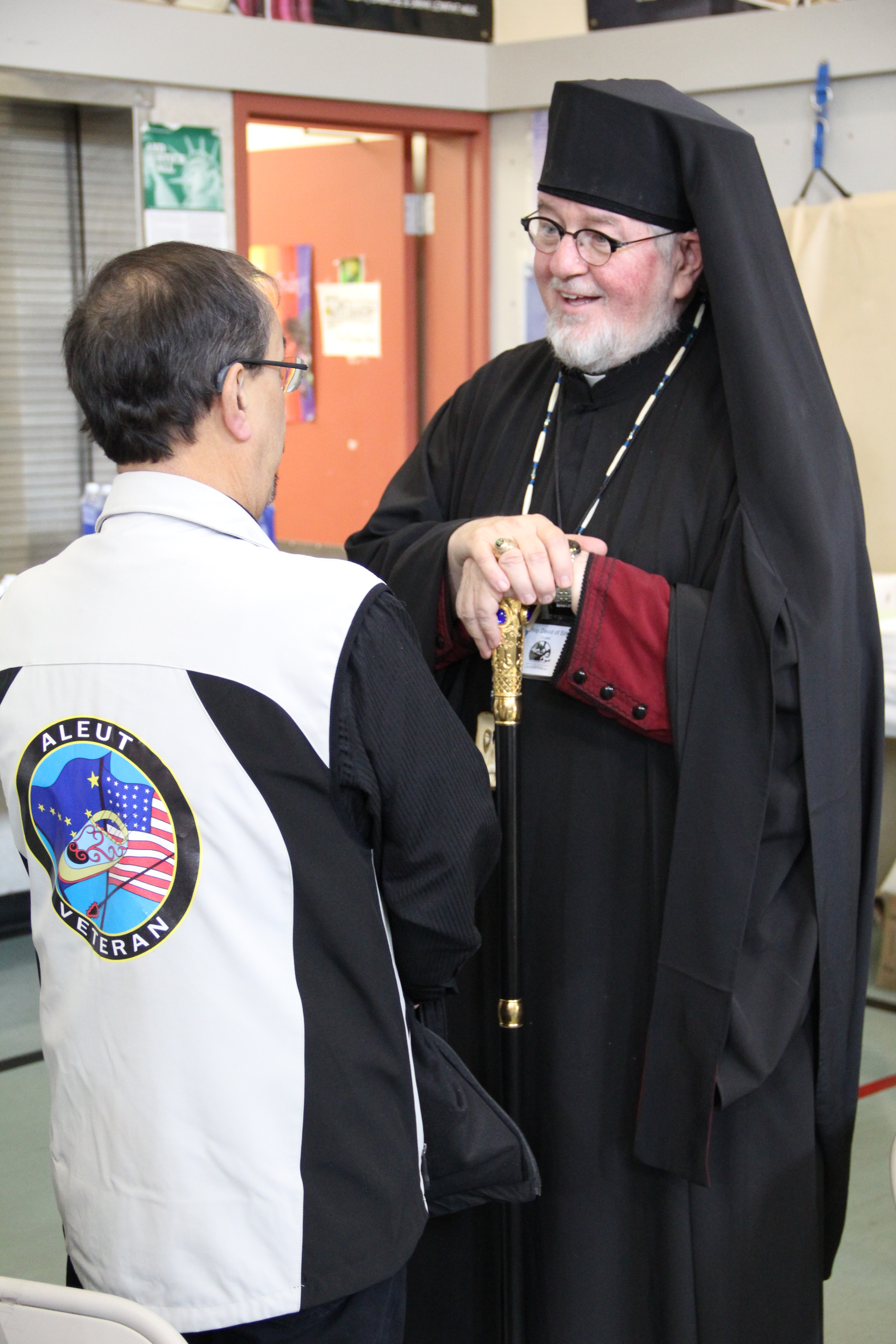
- Archdiocese: Orthodox Church in America Diocese of Alaska
- See: Alaska
- Installed: 16 October 2013
- Term ended: 27 November 2020
- Predecessor: Nicholas (Soraich)
- Successor: Alexei (Trader)

Orders
- Ordination: 12 April 1981 (diaconate); 31 July 1993 (priesthood)
- Consecration: 21 February 2014

Personal details
- Born: 25 May 1952 Altoona, Pennsylvania
- Died: 27 November 2020 (aged 68) Indianapolis, Indiana
- Denomination: Eastern Orthodox
- Spouse: Karen Mahaffey (m. 1973; died 2007)
- Children: 4
- Education: University of Scranton; Saint Tikhon's Seminary

David Mahaffey (secular name Sterry David Mahaffey Jr. (25 May 1952 – 27 November 2020)) was the Bishop of Sitka and Alaska from 2014 to 2020.

== Biography ==
Bishop David was born Sterry David Mahaffey Jr. on May 25, 1952, in Altoona, Pennsylvania. He was raised Methodist. In 1970 he studied at the Indiana University of Pennsylvania where he met his wife, Karen Meterko. They were married on May 5, 1973 and had between them four children together.

In 1997, he received a Master of Divinity from Saint Tikhon's Seminary. In 2003 he received Bachelor's in Theology and Philosophy from the University of Scranton and a Master of Arts in theology at the same school. In 2007 his wife Karen died from melanoma at the age of 55.

On September 15, 2012, he was nominated for the seat of Bishop of Alaska. He was tonsured a rasophore on September 23, 2012, and on February 21, 2014, he was consecrated as Bishop of Alaska at Saint Innocent Cathedral in Anchorage, Alaska. As bishop David called for spiritual growth and unity. In October 2014 he oversaw a church built in Kenya.

Bishop David died on November 27, 2020, of renal cancer. He was succeeded by Alexei of Bethesda.

Eastern Orthodox Church titles
Preceded by Nicholas (Soraich)	Bishop of Sitka and Alaska; 2014 – 2022	Succeeded by Alexei (Trader)
