= Orthodox Church in America Diocese of Alaska =

Religious organization in Alaska, United States

Coordinates: 61.2183°N 149.755°W

Diocese of Sitka and Alaska

Orthodox
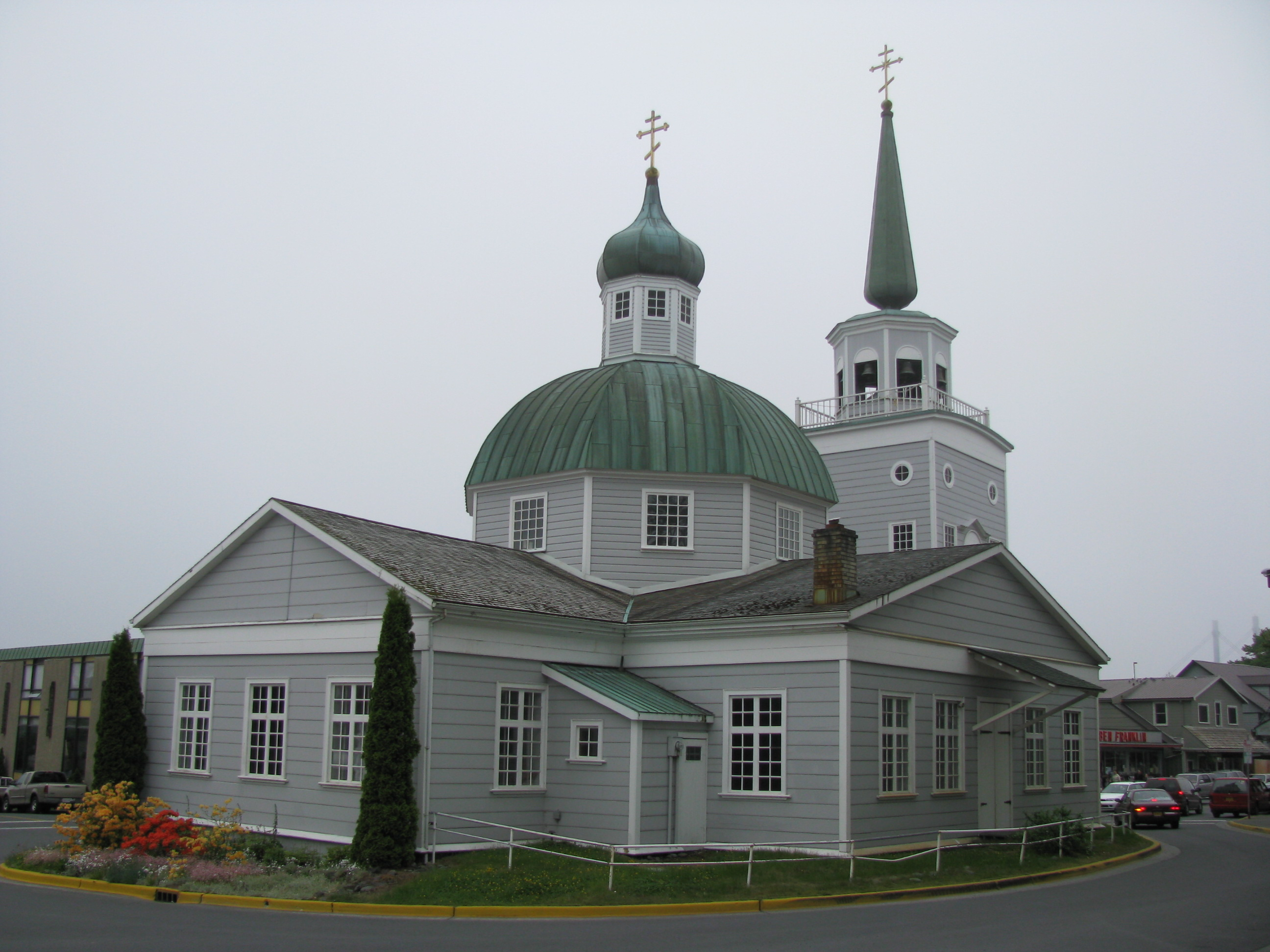
- St. Michael's Cathedral in Sitka, Alaska

Location
- Country: United States of America
- Territory: Alaska

Statistics
- Population: Total: 30,000
- Parishes: 89
- Denomination: Orthodox

Current leadership
- Bishop: Alexei (Trader)
- Metropolitan Archbishop: Tikhon (Mollard)

Map
- The states in which the Diocese of Alaska has jurisdiction.

Website
- https://odosa.org/

The Diocese of Alaska (Russian: Епархия Аляски, romanized: Yeparkhiya Alyaski) is a diocese of the Orthodox Church in America (OCA). Its territory includes parishes, monasteries, and missions located in Alaska. The diocesan chancery is located in Anchorage. The Diocese was founded when Alaska was part of Russia and is one of the oldest in the United States. The Church of the Holy Ascension (1826), which belongs to the Diocese, is one of the oldest American churches. The Diocese of Alaska was officially created in 1860s but the first orthodox missionary bishop was in 1840 Saint Innocent of Alaska, later Metropolitan of Moscow.

After the United States purchased Alaska in 1867, the Diocese was granted jurisdiction over all North America and the see moved to San Francisco between 1872 and 1903, and later in New York City, because the Orthodox Church had grown in other parts of America and Canada due to arrival of several immigrants from Eastern and Central Europe, and all these immigrants were united in this single North American Diocese.

In 1900 the Bishop of Alaska Tikhon (later Patriarch of Moscow, now a Saint) was named officially "Bishop of America", and in 1903 erected the "Alaska vicariate" with an auxiliary bishop. In 1920s and 1930s the Diocese was divided to create new dioceses and so the Diocese of Alaska returned to have the real see in Alaska.

Altogether, twenty-three churches are listed on the National Register of Historic Places; thirty churches are considered National Historic Landmarks. As of 2013, the Diocese includes 89 parishes, which represents the highest concentration of Orthodox Church in America parishes among the states. According to the Los Angeles Times, the diocese had around 30,000 members statewide as of 2006.

== Deaneries ==
The diocese is grouped geographically into deaneries. Each deanery is headed by a parish priest, known as a dean. The deans coordinate activities in their area's parishes, and report to the diocesan bishop. As of 2015, the deaneries of the Diocese of Alaska are:

- Alaska Peninsula Deanery
- Aleutian Deanery
- Anchorage Deanery
- Bethel and Kuskokwim Deanery
- Bristol Bay Deanery
- Iliamna Deanery
- Kenai and Prince William Sound Deanery
- Kodiak Deanery
- Russian Mission and Yukon Deanery
- Sitka and Southeast Deanery

== Bishops ==
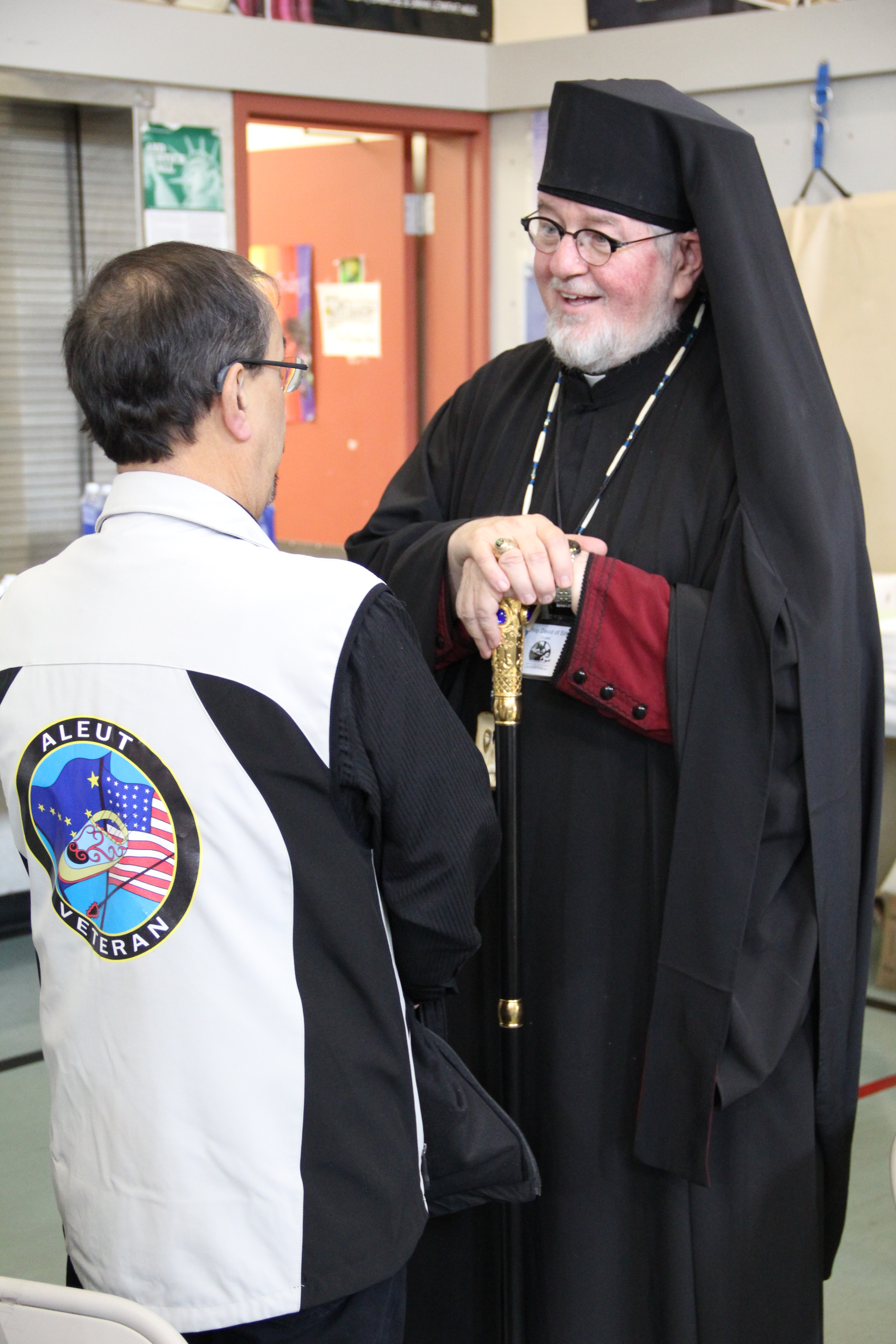
Bishop David in conversation with an Aleut military veteran, Unalaska, June 2017.

Alaska Vicariate of the North American Diocese

- Innocent (Pustynsky) (14 December 1903 — 1 May 1909)
- Alexander (Nemolovsky) (15 November 1909 — 6 July 1916)
- Philip (Stavitsky) (6 August 1916 — April 1919)
- Anthony (Dashkevich) (11 December 1921 — 7 February 1924)
- Amphilochius (Vakulsky) (28 July 1924 — September 1930)
- Antonin (Vasilyev) (11 October 1930 — 1934)

Diocese of Alaska

- Alexis (Panteleev) (November 1934 - 1944)
- John (Zlobin) (10 March 1946 - ca. 1952)
- Ambrose (Merezhko) (11 September 1955 - 1967)
- Theodosius (Lazor) (6 May 1967 - 30 May 1972)
- Gregory (Afonsky) (13 May 1973 - 20 July 1995)
  - Herman (Swaiko) (1995 - ca. Consecration. 2001) locum tenens
- Nicholas (Soraich) (4 March 2002 - 13 May 2008)
  - Herman (Swaiko) (13 May 2008 - 4 September 2008) locum tenens
  - Benjamin (Peterson) (4 September 2008 - 21 February 2014) locum tenens
- David (Mahaffey) (21 February 2014 - 27 November 2020)
  - Alexis (Trader) (3 November 2020 - 27 March 2022) Diocesan administrator
- Alexis (Trader) (27 March 2022 - present)

== See also ==
- List of Orthodox parishes in Alaska
