= List of Russian Orthodox churches =

This is a list of Russian Orthodox churches that are individually notable. This includes churches of the semi-autonomous Russian Orthodox Church Outside Russia and churches in Russia and elsewhere not within ROCOR's system.

== Argentina ==
- Cathedral of the Most Holy Trinity, Buenos Aires

== Armenia ==
- Church of the Intercession of the Holy Mother of God, Yerevan

== Azerbaijan ==
- Church of Michael the Archangel, Baku, Baku
- Holy Myrrhbearers Cathedral, Baku

== Canada ==
- List of Russian Orthodox Churches in Toronto Area

== Cuba ==
- Our Lady of Kazan Orthodox Cathedral, Havana

== Denmark ==
- Alexander Nevsky Church, Copenhagen

== France ==
- Russian Orthodox Cathedral, Nice
- Alexander Nevsky Cathedral, Paris

== Germany ==
- Russian Orthodox Church, Dresden
- Russian Orthodox Chapel, Weimar
- St Elizabeth's Church, Wiesbaden

== Israel ==
- Church of Mary Magdalene, East Jerusalem

== Latvia ==
- Ss. Boris and Gleb Cathedral, Daugavpils

== Lithuania ==
- Orthodox Church of St. Michael and St. Constantine, Vilnius

== Luxembourg ==
- St. Peter and Paul Church, Luxembourg

== Morocco ==
- Russian Orthodox Church in Rabat, Rabat

== Norway ==
- Bakke Church, Trondheim

== Russia ==
=== Moscow and region ===
- Alexander Nevsky Cathedral, Moscow
- Saint Basil's Cathedral, Red Square, Moscow
- Cathedral of Christ the Saviour, Moscow, tallest Orthodox Christian church in the world
- Dormition Cathedral, Moscow
- Saint Sophia Church, Moscow, Balchug Island, Moscow
- Orekhovo-Borisovo Metochion, in Orekhovo-Borisovo, near Moscow
- Church of Righteous John the Russian, in Kuntsevo, Moscow

=== Saint Petersburg ===
- Annunciation Church of the Alexander Nevsky Lavra
- Dukhovskaya Church
- Feodorovskaya Church
- Gate Church
- Holy Trinity Cathedral of the Alexander Nevsky Lavra
- Kazan Cathedral, St. Petersburg
- Saint Andrew's Cathedral (Saint Petersburg)
- St. Vladimir's Cathedral (St. Petersburg)
- Transfiguration Cathedral (Saint Petersburg)
- Trinity Cathedral, Saint Petersburg
- Chesme Church, St. Petersburg
- Church of Our Lady the Merciful, St. Petersburg
- Church of the Savior on Blood, St. Petersburg
- Saint Isaac's Cathedral, St. Petersburg
- Peter and Paul Cathedral, St. Petersburg
- Saint Sampson's Cathedral, St. Petersburg
- St. Nicholas Naval Cathedral, St. Petersburg
- Smolny Convent, near St. Petersburg
- Sophia Cathedral, Sophia, near St. Petersburg

=== Novgorod and area ===
- Saint Nicholas Cathedral, Novgorod
- Saint Sophia Cathedral in Novgorod
- Sts. Peter and Paul Church, Novgorod
- Church of St. Paraskevi, Novgorod
- Saviour Church on Nereditsa

=== other ===
- Ascension Cathedral, Almaty
- Alexander Nevsky Cathedral (Izhevsk)
- St. Michael's Cathedral (Izhevsk)
- Cathedral of Christ the Saviour (Kaliningrad)
- Dormition Cathedral, Khabarovsk
- Transfiguration Cathedral, Khabarovsk
- Königsberg Cathedral
- Naval Cathedral in Kronstadt
- Saint Andrew's Cathedral, Kronstadt
- Cathedral of St. Theodore Ushakov, Saransk, Mordovia
- The Cathedral of the Holy and Righteous Warrior Feodor Ushakov, Saransk, Mordovia
- Novocherkassk Cathedral, Novocherkassk
- Alexander Nevsky Cathedral, Novosibirsk
- Assumption Cathedral, Omsk
- St. Nicholas Cossack Cathedral, Omsk
- Ivanovsky Monastery, Pskov
- Assumption Cathedral in Smolensk
- Transfiguration Cathedral (Tolyatti)
- Odigitrievsky Cathedral, Ulan Ude
- Cathedral of Saint Demetrius, Vladimir
- Dormition Cathedral, Vladimir
- Saint Sophia Cathedral, Vologda
- Annunciation Cathedral, Voronezh
- Fyodorovskaya Church, Yaroslavl
- Saint George Cathedral, Yuryev-Polsky
- Soothe My Sorrows Church, Saratov

== Serbia ==
- Church of the Holy Trinity, Belgrade

== United Arab Emirates ==
- Russian Orthodox Church, Sharjah

== United Kingdom ==
- Russian Orthodox Cathedral of the Dormition of the Mother of God and All Saints, London
- Cathedral of the Nativity of the Most Holy Mother of God and the Holy Royal Martyrs, London

== United States ==
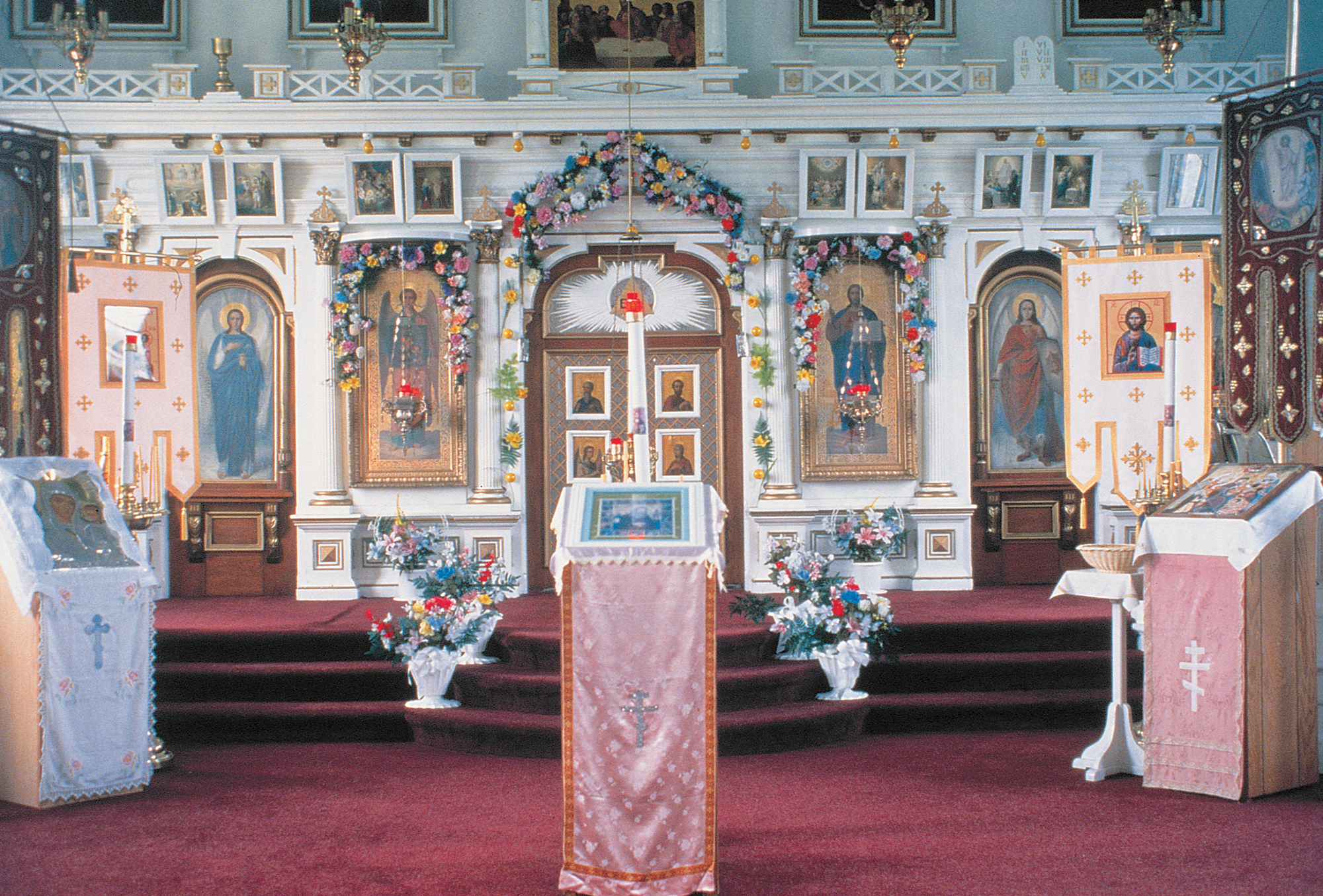
Interior of St. Nicholas Chapel (Seldovia, Alaska)

In the United States there are numerous notable Russian Orthodox churches, including many that were listed on the U.S. National Register of Historic Places in 1980 as part of one study. In Alaska, the Russian America community includes more than 20,000 members of the Russian Orthodox church. Many of the notable churches are current churches within List of Orthodox parishes in Alaska.

Churches include:

=== in Alaska ===
(ordered by city or village)

| Church | Image | Dates | Location | City, State | Description |
|---|---|---|---|---|---|
| Church of the Nativity of the Theotokos | | 1901-05 built 1980 NRHP-listed | 58°0′38″N 152°45′46″W | Afognak, Alaska | |
| Protection of the Theotokos Chapel | | built 1980 NRHP-listed | 56°56′45″N 154°10′6″W | Akhiok, Alaska | |
| St. Alexander Nevsky Chapel | | 1878 founded 1918 built 1980 NRHP-listed | 54°8′9″N 165°46′39″W | Akutan, Alaska | |
| St. John the Baptist Church (Angoon, Alaska) | | 1929 built 1980 NRHP-listed | 57°30′14″N 134°35′3″W | Angoon, Alaska | |
| Holy Resurrection Church (Belkofski, Alaska) | | 1980 NRHP-listed | 55°5′9″N 162°1′9″W | Belkofski, Alaska | |
| St. Sergius Chapel | | 1891 built 1980 NRHP-listed | 61°34′18″N 159°14′26″W | Chuathbaluk, Alaska | On the Kuskokwim River; is also known as the "Little Russian Mission" |
| St. Michael the Archangel Church (Cordova, Alaska) | | 1925 built 1980 NRHP-listed | 60°32′33″N 145°44′16″W | Cordova, Alaska | |
| Old St. Nicholas Russian Orthodox Church | | 1972 NRHP-listed | Eklutna Village Rd. | Eklutna, Alaska | |
| St. Nicholas Chapel (Ekuk, Alaska) | | built 1980 NRHP-listed | | Ekuk, Alaska | |
| Sts. Sergius and Herman of Valaam Church | | c.1930 built 1980 NRHP-listed | | English Bay, Alaska | Nave section once was a dance hall |
| St. Nicholas Chapel (Igiugig, Alaska) | | 1930 built 1980 NRHP-listed | 59°20′5″N 155°32′27″W | Igiugig, Alaska | |
| St. Nicholas Russian Orthodox Church (Juneau, Alaska) | | 1893 built 1973 NRHP-listed | 326 5th St. 58°18′11.65″N 134°24′32.39″W | Juneau, Alaska | |
| Ascension of Our Lord Chapel | | 1888 built 1980 NRHP-listed | 57°34′8″N 154°27′19″W | Karluk, Alaska | |
| Holy Assumption of the Virgin Mary Church | | 1895 built 1970 NRHP-listed | Mission and Overland Streets; 60°33′10.7″N 151°16′3.4″W | Kenai, Alaska | |
| Holy Resurrection Church (Kodiak, Alaska) | | 1796 founded 1945 built 1977 NRHP-listed | Mission Road and Kashevaroff Street; 57°47′18.4″N 152°24′10″W | Kodiak, Alaska | |
| St. Nicholas Russian Orthodox Church (Kwethluk, Alaska) | | built 1991 NRHP-listed | Lower Kuskokim R. | Kwethluk, Alaska | |
| Sts. Constantine and Helen Chapel | | built 1980 NRHP-listed | | Lime Village, Alaska | |
| St. Seraphim Chapel | | 1800s built 1980 NRHP-listed | 61°30′45″N 160°21′29″W | Lower Kalskag, Alaska | |
| St. John the Baptist Chapel (Naknek, Alaska) | | built 1980 NRHP-listed | | Naknek, Alaska | |
| St. Jacob's Church (Napaskiak, Alaska) | | 1980 NRHP-listed | 60°42′30″N 161°45′47″W | Napaskiak, Alaska | |
| Presentation of Our Lord Chapel | | before 1914 founded 1929 built 1980 NRHP-listed | 62°58′3″N 154°9′42″W | Nikolai, Alaska | |
| St. Nicholas Church (Nikolski, Alaska) | | 1930 built 1980 NRHP-listed | 52°56′17″N 168°52′4″W | Nikolski, Alaska | |
| Holy Transfiguration of Our Lord Chapel | | 1901 built 1978 NRHP-listed | Sterling Highway; 60°3′1″N 151°39′53″W | Ninilchik, Alaska | |
| St. Nicholas Chapel (Nondalton, Alaska) | | 1920s built 1980 NRHP-listed | 2nd Avenue; 59°58′24″N 154°50′55″W | Nondalton, Alaska | |
| Transfiguration of Our Lord Chapel | | built 1980 NRHP-listed | | Nushagak, Alaska | |
| Nativity of Our Lord Chapel | | 1906 built 1980 NRHP-listed | 57°55′26″N 152°29′54″W | Ouzinkie, Alaska | |
| Sts. Sergius and Herman of Valaam Chapel | | 1898 built 1980 NRHP-listed | Spruce Island, Mok's Lagoon; 59°21′22″N 151°55′13″W | Ouzinkie, Alaska | |
| St. Nicholas Chapel (Pedro Bay, Alaska) | | 1890 built 1980 NRHP-listed | 59°47′7″N 154°6′9″W | Pedro Bay, Alaska | |
| St. John the Theologian Church | | c.1915 built 1980 NRHP-listed | 55°54′45″N 159°8′35″W | Perryville, Alaska | |
| St. Nicholas Church (Pilot Point, Alaska) | | 1980 NRHP-listed | 56°54′52″N 157°36′5″W | Pilot Point, Alaska | |
| St. George the Great Martyr Orthodox Church | | 1935 built 1980 NRHP-listed | St. George Island56°33′6″N 169°33′5″W | St. George, Alaska | |
| Sts. Peter and Paul Church (St. Paul Island, Alaska) | | 1907 built 1980 NRHP-listed | 57°7′27″N 170°16′57″W | St. Paul Island, Alaska | |
| St. Nicholas Chapel (Sand Point, Alaska) | | 1936 built 1980 NRHP-listed | 55°15′16″N 160°29′57″W | Sand Point, Alaska | |
| St. Nicholas Chapel (Seldovia, Alaska) | | 1980 NRHP-listed | 59°25′49″N 151°42′40″W | Seldovia, Alaska | |
| St. Michael's Cathedral (Sitka, Alaska) | | 1848 built 1966 NRHP-listed | Lincoln and Maksoutoff District; 57.0501°N 135.3351°W | Sitka, Alaska | Designated a U.S. National Historic Landmark in 1962 |
| Elevation of Holy Cross Church | | 1980 NRHP-listed | 58°42′56″N 157°0′9″W | South Naknek, Alaska | |
| Church of the Holy Ascension | | 1826 built 1970 NRHP-listed | 53°52′32″N 166°32′10″W | Unalaska, Alaska | Designated as a U.S. National Historic Landmark |

=== other than in Alaska ===
| Church | Image | Dates | Location | City, State | Description |
|---|---|---|---|---|---|
| Holy Virgin Cathedral | | 1961-65 built | 6210 Geary Boulevard; 37.78041°N 122.48624°W | San Francisco, California | |
| Holy Trinity Russian Orthodox Cathedral and Rectory | | 1903 built 1976 NRHP-listed | 1121 N. Leavitt Street; 41°54′6.98″N 87°40′54.77″W | Chicago, Illinois | Louis Sullivan-designed |
| Holy Trinity Russian Orthodox Church | | 1919 founded | 1723 East Fairmount Avenue; 39.29232°N 76.59246°W | Baltimore, Maryland | |
| Transfiguration of our Lord Russian Orthodox Church | | 1963 founded | 1723 East Fairmount Avenue; 39.29232°N 76.59246°W | Baltimore, Maryland | |
| Sts. Peter and Paul Russian Orthodox Church | | 1915-18 built 1983 NRHP-listed | 47°54′18″N 93°9′53″W | Bramble, Minnesota | |
| St. Alexander Nevsky Cathedral (Howell, New Jersey) | | | | Howell, New Jersey | |
| Church of the Holy Innocents (Albany, New York) | | 1850 built 1978 NRHP-listed | 42°39′31″N 73°44′54″W | Albany, New York | Onion dome was added by the Russian Orthodox church that used this building for a while |
| Russian Orthodox Cathedral of the Transfiguration of Our Lord | | 1916-21 built 1980 NRHP-listed | 228 N. 12th St. 40°43′10″N 73°57′13″W | Brooklyn, New York | |
| Holy Trinity Monastery (Jordanville, New York) | | 1947-51 built 2011 NRHP-listed | 1407 Robinson Road; 42°55′39″N 74°56′2″W | Jordanville, New York | |
| St. Theodosius Russian Orthodox Cathedral | | 1896 founded 1912 built 1974 NRHP-listed | 733 Starkweather Ave. 41°28′38″N 81°40′54″W | Cleveland, Ohio | |
| St. Andrew's Cathedral, Philadelphia | | 1897 built | | Philadelphia, Pennsylvania | |
| New Martyrs of Russia Orthodox Church | | 1982 built | | Mulino, Oregon | |

=== See also ===
- Russian Bishop's House, Lincoln and Monastery Sts., Sitka, Alaska

== Uruguay ==
- Russian Orthodox Church of the Resurrection, Montevideo
