= National Register of Historic Places listings in Dillingham Census Area, Alaska =

Location of the Dillingham Census Area in Alaska

This is a list of the National Register of Historic Places listings in Dillingham Census Area, Alaska.

This is intended to be a complete list of the properties and districts on the National Register of Historic Places in Dillingham Census Area, Alaska, United States. The locations of National Register properties and districts for which the latitude and longitude coordinates are included below, may be seen in a Google map.

There are 3 properties and districts listed on the National Register in the census area, including one National Historic Landmark District. Another property was once listed but has been delisted.

This National Park Service list is complete through NPS recent listings posted March 21, 2025.

== Current listings ==
	Name on the Register	Image	Date listed	Location	City or town	Description
1	St. Nicholas Chapel	St. Nicholas Chapel	June 6, 1980 (#80000749)	On a bluff about 1 mile (1.6 km) south of Ekuk; 58°47′53″N 158°33′04″W	Ekuk	
2	Transfiguration of Our Lord Chapel	Transfiguration of Our Lord Chapel	June 6, 1980 (#80000752)	In Nushagak; 58°56′47″N 158°29′27″W	Nushagak	
3	Walrus Islands Archeological District	Walrus Islands Archeological District	December 23, 2016 (#100000875)	Bristol Bay; 58°41′16″N 160°08′20″W	Togiak	

== Former listings ==
	Name on the Register	Image	Date listed	Date removed	Location	City or town	Description
1	Fishermen's Co-op		April 13, 1995 (#95000400)	August 11, 1999	247 Main Street	Dillingham	

== See also ==
- List of National Historic Landmarks in Alaska
- National Register of Historic Places listings in Alaska
