= St. Nicholas Chapel (Ekuk, Alaska) =

Historic church in Alaska, United States

- U.S. National Register of Historic Places
- Alaska Heritage Resources Survey
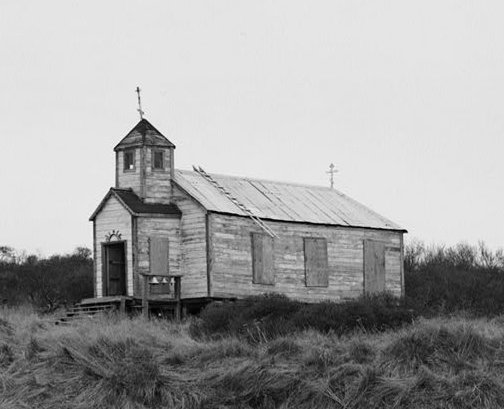
- 1990 HABS photo

- Location within Alaska
- Location: On a bluff about 1 mile (1.6 km) south of Ekuk, Alaska
- Coordinates: 58°47′53″N 158°33′04″W
- Area: less than one acre
- Built: 1918
- MPS: Russian Orthodox Church Buildings and Sites TR
- NRHP reference No.: 80000749
- AHRS No.: XNB-011

Significant dates
- Added to NRHP: June 6, 1980
- Designated AHRS: May 18, 1973

St. Nicholas Chapel, also known as the Santa Claus Church, is a historic Russian Orthodox church in Ekuk, Alaska, United States. The small, single story wood-frame building was constructed in 1918 or 1919, replacing an earlier church. When originally built it was 16 feet wide and 21 feet long, but the chamber was subsequently lengthened, and is now 34 feet long. If it were not for its modest exterior religious symbols, it might be mistaken for a rural schoolhouse. The church and its graveyard are located on a bluff which is subject to extensive erosion of the coast and, being just 185 feet from the shoreline, could be endangered in the next 50–100 years.

The church was listed on the National Register of Historic Places in 1980.

== See also ==
- National Register of Historic Places listings in Dillingham Census Area, Alaska
