= Walrus Islands =

Archaeological site in Alaska, United States

- Walrus Islands Archeological District
- U.S. National Register of Historic Places
- U.S. National Historic Landmark District
- Alaska Heritage Resources Survey
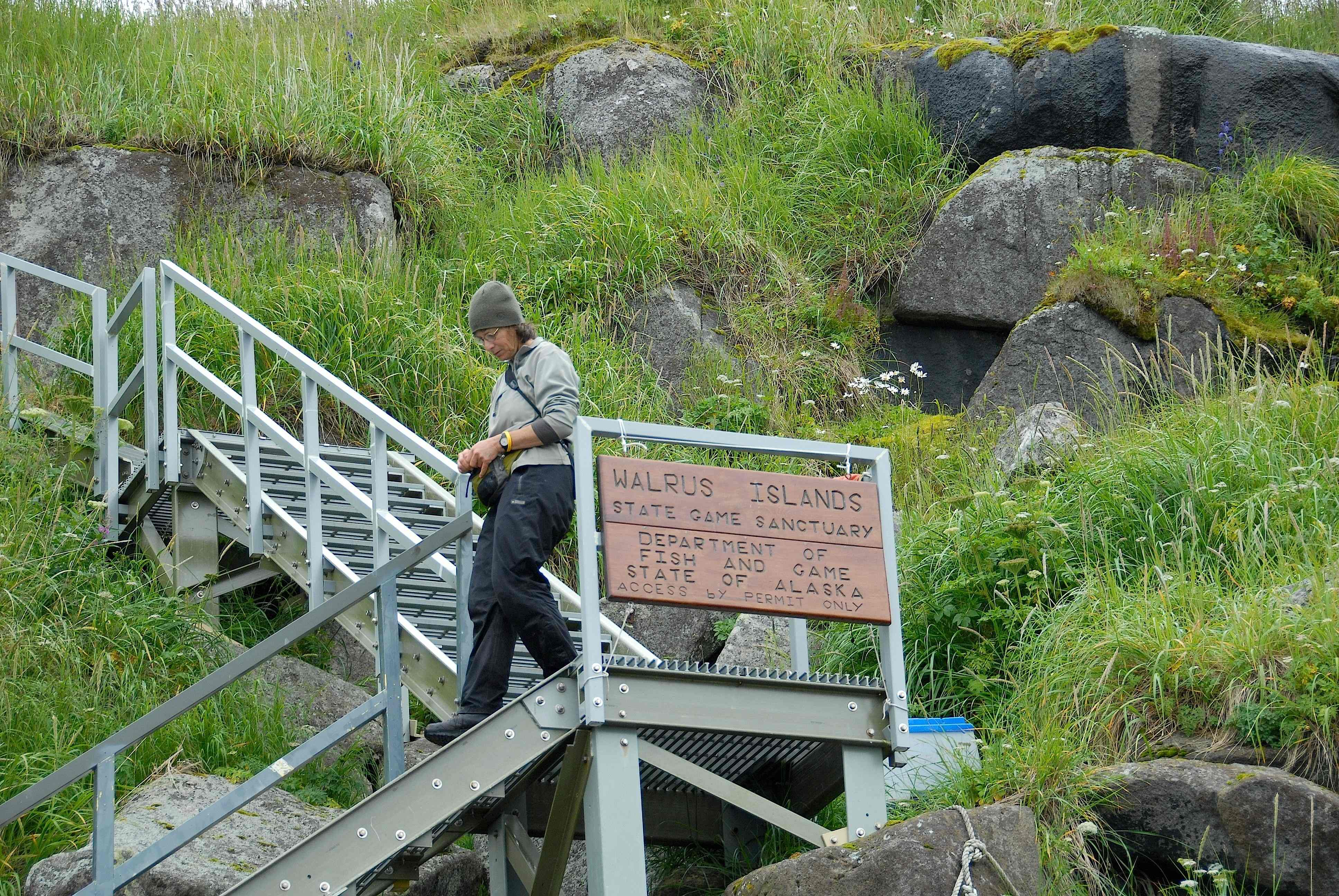
- Entrance to Round Island, Alaska

- Location within Alaska
- Location: Bristol Bay, Alaska
- Coordinates: 58°41′16″N 160°08′20″W
- Area: 9,187 acres (3,718 ha)
- NRHP reference No.: 100000875
- AHRS No.: XHI-093; XNB-145

Significant dates
- Added to NRHP: December 23, 2016
- Designated NHLD: December 23, 2016

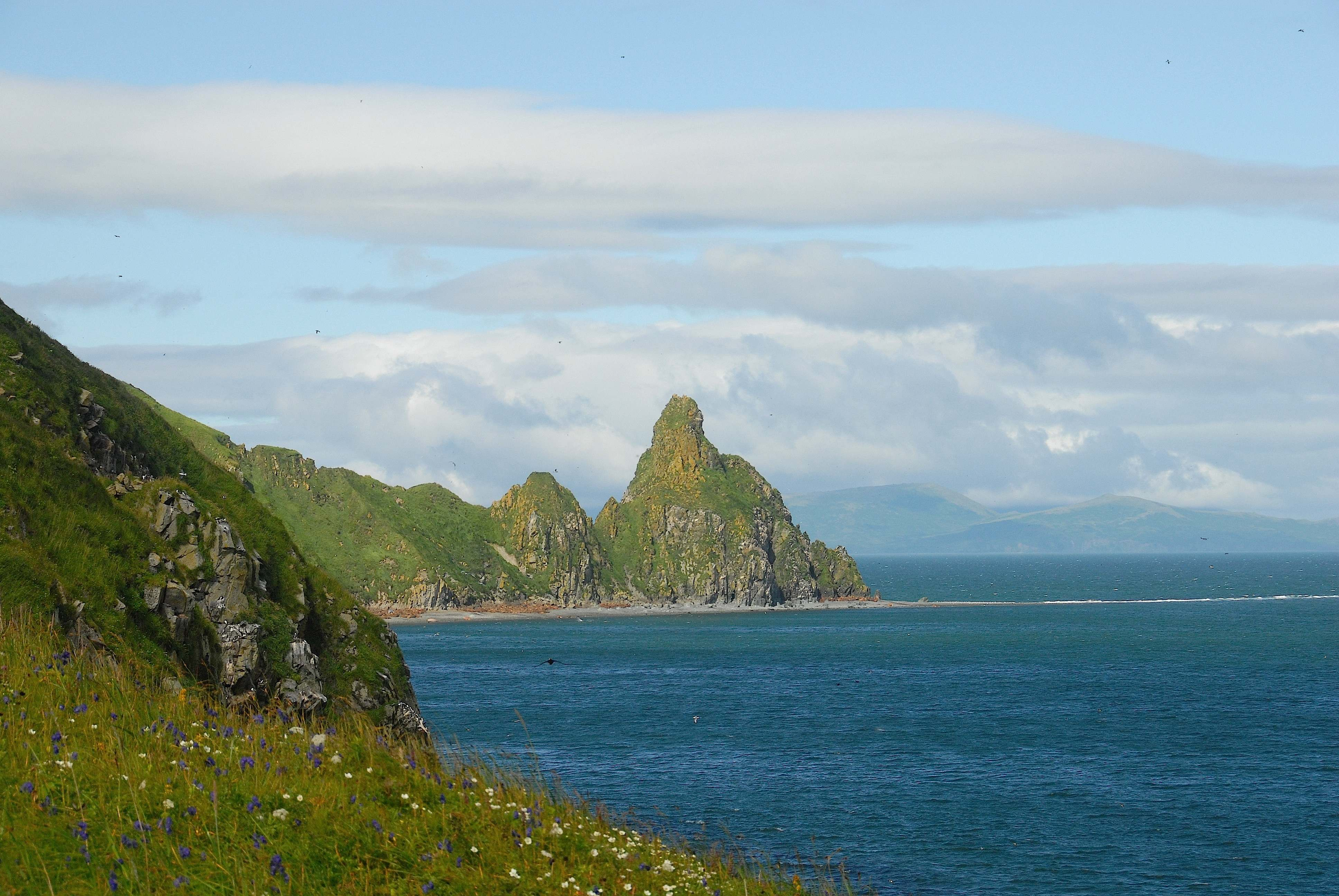
coast looking Northwest - Walrus Islands State Game Sanctuary, Round Island, Alaska

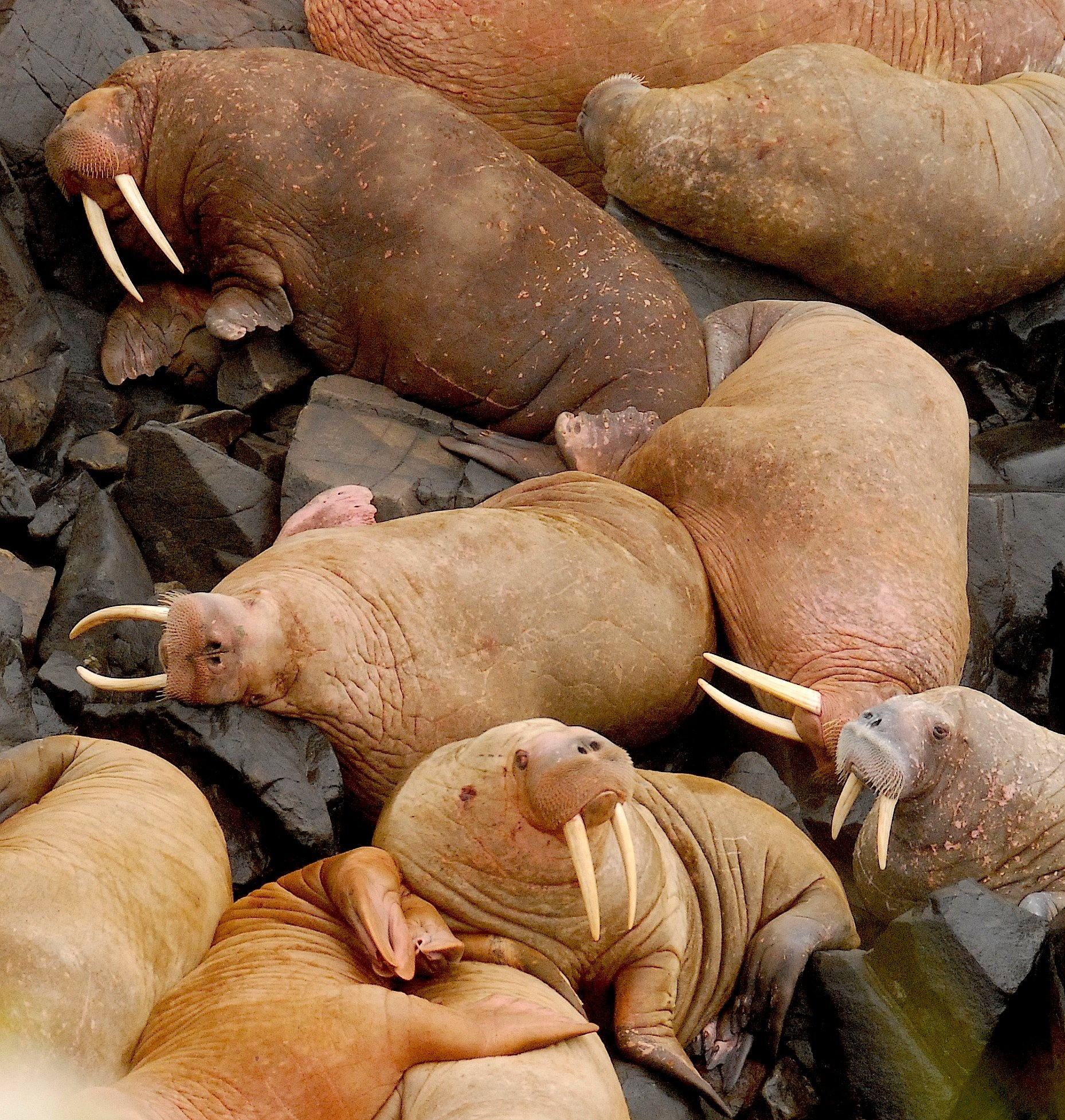
Walruses (Odobenus rosmarus) on Round Island, Alaska

The Walrus Islands (Russian: Моржовые острова) are a group of craggy coastal islands in the Bering Sea, close to the northern shores of Bristol Bay, Alaska at the entrance to Togiak Bay. They are located 18 km to the east of Hagemeister Island, and are protected as the Walrus Islands State Game Sanctuary by the state. A part of the island group is also of archaeological importance, with numerous deeply stratified sites covering 6,000 years of human use. For this reason, Crooked Island, Summit Island and Round Island were designated the Walrus Islands Archeological District, a National Historic Landmark District comprising 14 historical sites, in December 2016.

In 1968, the Walrus Islands were designated as a National Natural Landmark by the National Park Service.

== Description and history ==
The Walrus Islands consist of a small group of islands and rocky islets extending to the southeast. The main islands are: Summit Island (close to the coast), High Island, Crooked Island, Black Rock Island and Round Island, not to be confused with Round Island (Aleutian Islands). The longest island is Crooked Island with a length of 10 km from north to south. The highest point is 69 m. Administratively these islands belong to the Dillingham Census Area, Alaska.

This island group was first explored by Captain James Cook in 1785. The Russian name "Morzh", meaning "walrus", was first used by Lt. Sarichev (1826, map 3), IRN (Imperial Russian Navy). Captain Tebenkov applied the name "Ostrova Morzhovyye" ("Walrus Islands") to the whole group of islands east of Hagemeister Island (1852, map 4), IRN. Captain Tebenkov also identified Walrus Island with the "Ound Island" of Capt. Cook (1785, v. 28 p. 431), RN.

The Walrus Islands earned their name because of the immense concentration of walruses in the adjacent waters of these islands every summer, the largest concentration being in Round Island, where 14,000 male walruses which have hauled out, have been observed on a single day. The island group forms the Walrus Islands State Game Sanctuary, managed by the Alaska Department of Fish and Game and a permit is required to visit Round Island. On January 11, 2017, President Barack Obama announced the designation of the island group as a National Historic Landmark District. The island contains a copious record of archaeological evidence of human occupation dating back to the Norton Tradition 6,000 years ago, about the time Bering Sea level rose to separate the Islands from the mainland, and the more recent Thule Tradition.

The Walrus Islands should not be confused with Walrus Island located in the southeastern shores of the Bristol Bay or with tiny Walrus Island located in the Pribilof group.

== See also ==
- List of National Historic Landmarks in Alaska
- National Register of Historic Places listings in Dillingham Census Area, Alaska
