= Karluk, Alaska =

Karluk Kal’uq, Kal’ut
- Census-designated place
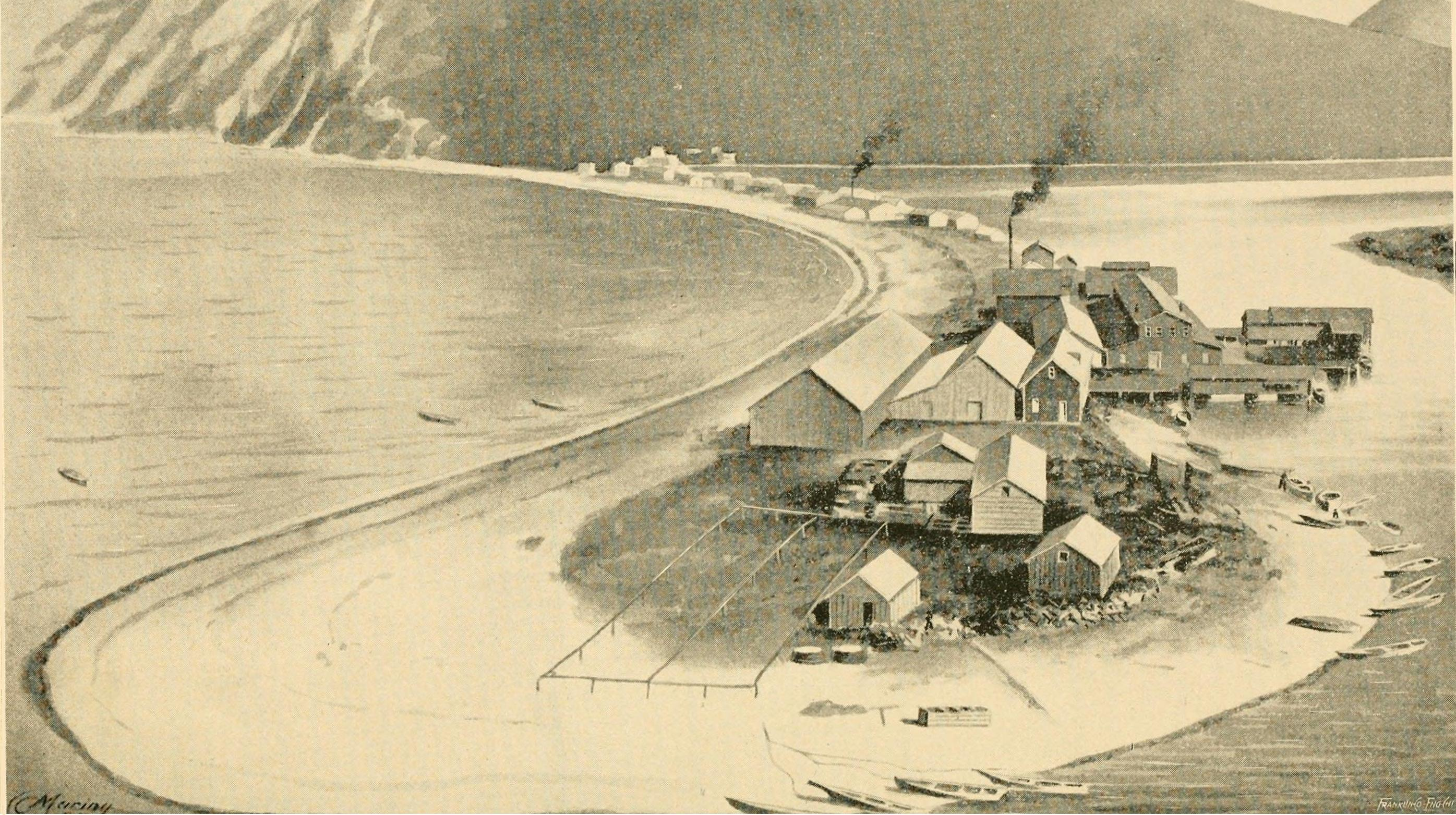
- Karluk sandspit in the late 1800s showing cannery and village; the source termed the Karluk River the "River of Life" due to the dense salmon run

- Location in Alaska
- Coordinates: 57°34′41″N 154°21′45″W
- Country: United States
- State: Alaska
- Borough: Kodiak Island

Government
  - Borough mayor: Jerrol Friend
  - State senator: Gary Stevens (R)
  - State rep.: Louise Stutes (R)

Area
  - Total: 57.86 sq mi (149.86 km^{2})
  - Land: 55.94 sq mi (144.89 km^{2})
  - Water: 1.92 sq mi (4.97 km^{2})

Population (2020)
  - Total: 27
  - Density: 0.49/sq mi (0.19/km^{2})
- Time zone: UTC-9 (Alaska (AKST))
  - Summer (DST): UTC-8 (AKDT)
- ZIP code: 99608
- Area code: 907
- FIPS code: 02-37540

Karluk (Kal’uq or Kal’ut in Alutiiq; Russian: Карлук) is a census-designated place (CDP) in Kodiak Borough, Kodiak Island, Alaska, United States. As of the 2020 census, Karluk had a population of 27.

== Geography ==
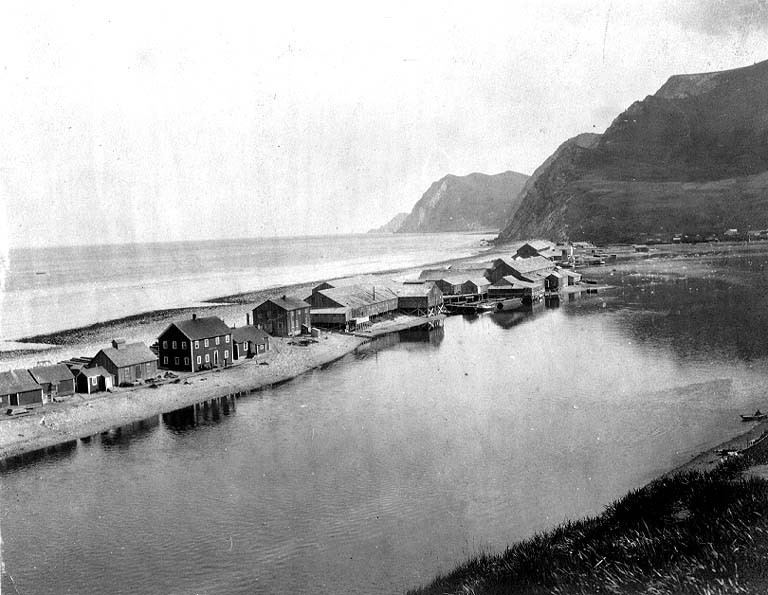
The Karluk Spit, 1906

Karluk is located at 57°34′41″N 154°21′45″W (57.578081, -154.362557)

According to the United States Census Bureau, the CDP has a total area of 57.9 square miles (149.9 km^{2}), of which 55.4 square miles (143.6 km^{2}) is land and 2.4 square miles (6.3 km^{2}), or 4.20%, is water. Karluk is 88 miles (142 km) southwest of Kodiak City. The elevation is 137 feet (42 m).

== Demographics ==
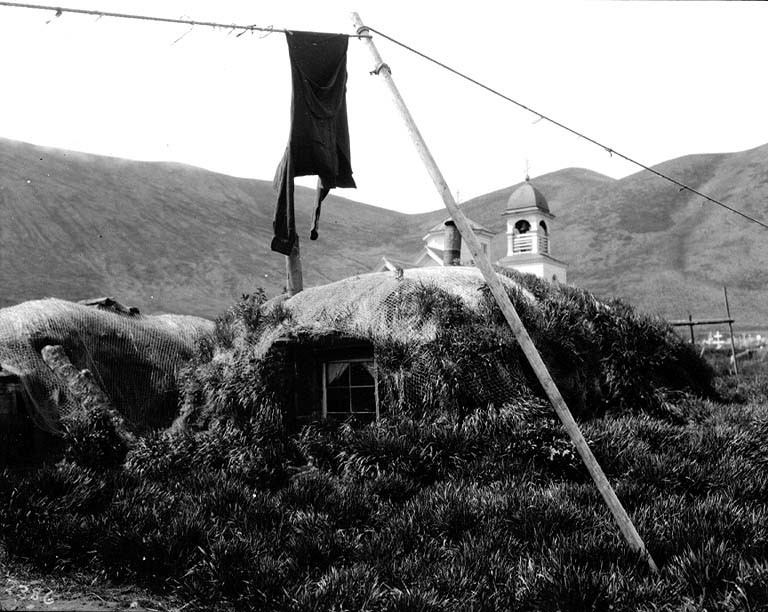
Barabaras in Karluk with steeple in background

Historical population
Census	Pop.	Note	%±
1880	302		—
1890	1,123		271.9%
1900	470		−58.1%
1910	549		16.8%
1920	99		−82.0%
1930	192		93.9%
1940	189		−1.6%
1950	144		−23.8%
1960	129		−10.4%
1970	98		−24.0%
1980	96		−2.0%
1990	71		−26.0%
2000	27		−62.0%
2010	37		37.0%
2020	27		−27.0%
U.S. Decennial Census

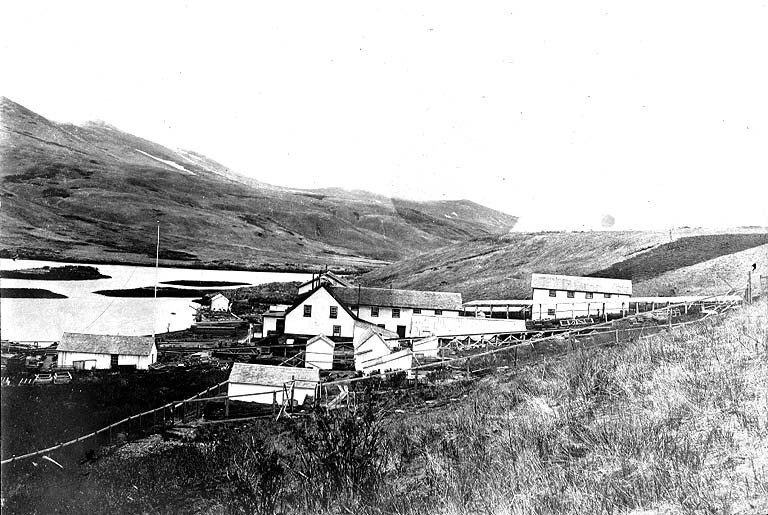
Alaska Packers Association hatchery at Karluk, photo by John Nathan Cobb

Karluk first appeared on the 1880 U.S. Census as an unincorporated village with 302 residents, including an Alutiiq majority of 277, with 24 people of mixed Russian & Native desent) and 1 White. In 1890, it reported 1,123 residents, making it the 3rd largest community in Alaska, narrowly behind Juneau with 1,253 and the then-capital of Sitka with 1,190. A plurality being Asian, with 542 (the largest community of Asians), 391 Whites, 167 Native Alaskans, 20 Creoles and 3 not classified. It has continued to report in every successive census to date. It was erroneously reported on the 1940 census as "Karluck." In 1980, it was made a census-designated place (CDP).

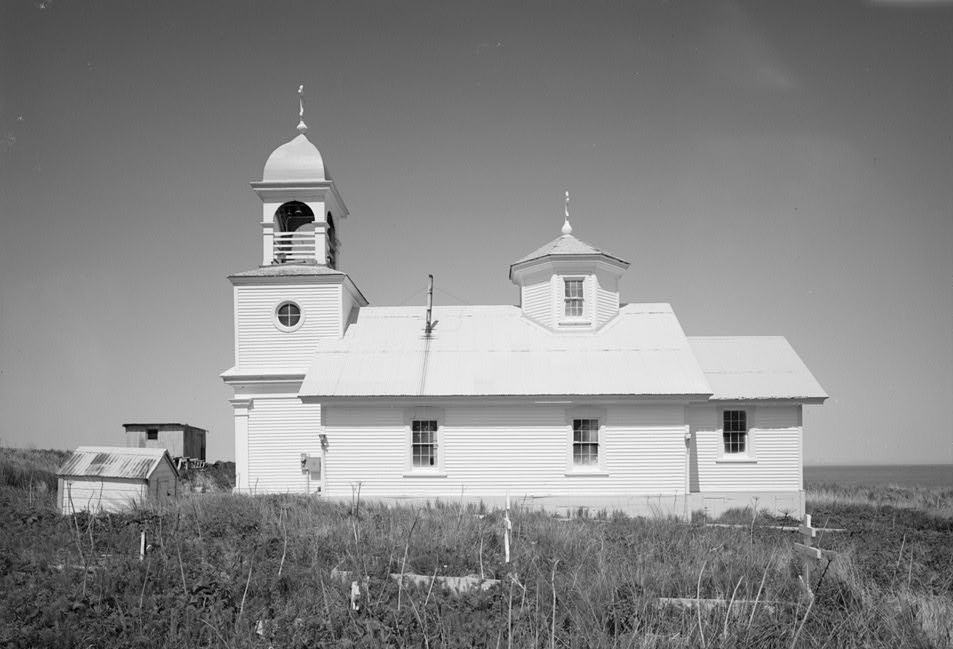
Ascension of Our Lord Russian Orthodox Church in Karluk. Built in 1888, the building was added to the National Register of Historic Places on June 6, 1980.

As of the census of 2000, there were 27 people, 9 households, and 7 families residing in the CDP. The population density was 0.5 inhabitants per square mile (0.19/km^{2}). There were 24 housing units at an average density of 0.4 per square mile (0.15/km^{2}). The racial makeup of the CDP was 0.00% White, 96.30% Native American and 3.70% Asian.

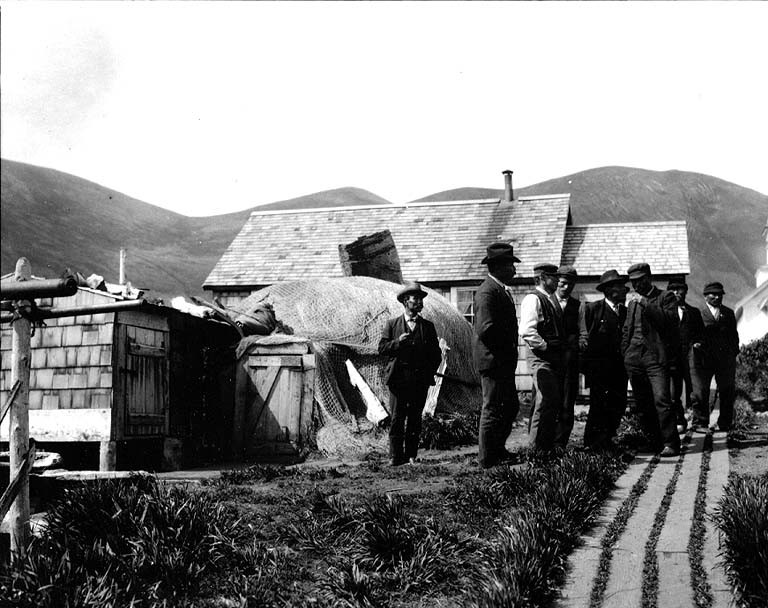
Men in Karluk Village, 1906. Sod hut (barabara) in background

There were 9 households, out of which 44.4% had children under the age of 18 living with them, 33.3% were married couples living together, 33.3% had a female householder with no husband present, and 22.2% were non-families. 22.2% of all households were made up of individuals, and none had someone living alone who was 65 years of age or older. The average household size was 3.00 and the average family size was 3.43.

In the CDP, the population was spread out, with 37.0% under the age of 18, 7.4% from 18 to 24, 33.3% from 25 to 44, 14.8% from 45 to 64, and 7.4% who were 65 years of age or older. The median age was 30 years. For every 100 females, there were 125.0 males. For every 100 females age 18 and over, there were 112.5 males.

The median income for a household in the CDP was $19,167, and the median income for a family was $19,167. Males had a median income of $0 versus $20,000 for females. The per capita income for the CDP was $13,736. There were no families and none of the population living below the poverty line, including no under eighteens and none of those over 64.

== History ==
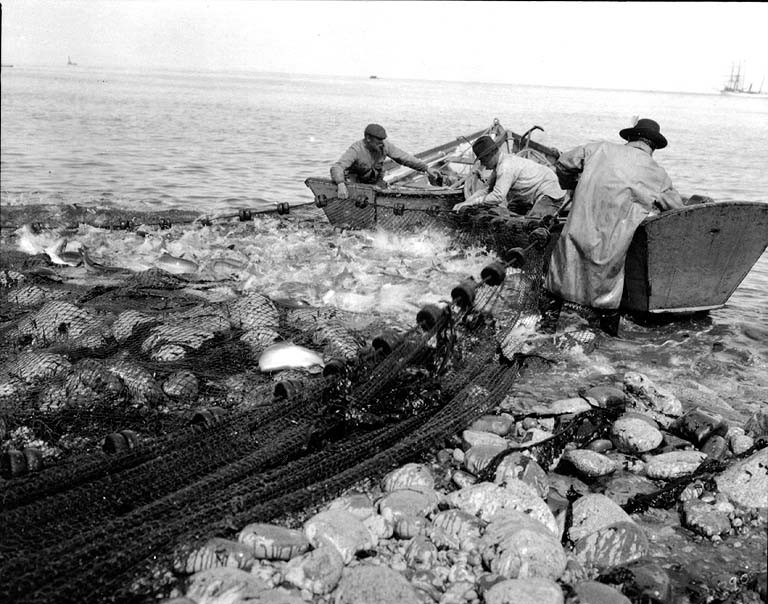
Hauling a salmon seine in Karluk, 1906

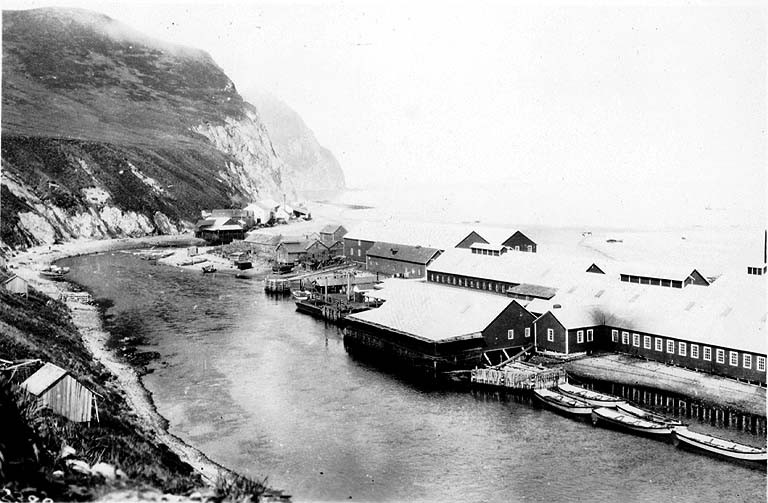
Karluk Cannery

In 1787 Evstratii Delarov, manager of the Russian Shelikhov-Golikov Company established an outpost at Karluk.

On March 17, 1945, the village participated in the rescue of seven (7) U.S. Navy aviators who ditched their PB1 Ventura patrol bomber offshore.

In 2021, the Ascension of Our Lord Chapel was relocated from a bluff overlooking the river to prevent its destruction.

== Education ==
The Karluk School, a K-12 rural school, is operated by the Kodiak Island Borough School District.

== See also ==
- Native Village of Karluk
