= Church of St. Constantine and St. Michael =

Russian Orthodox church in Vilnius, Lithuania

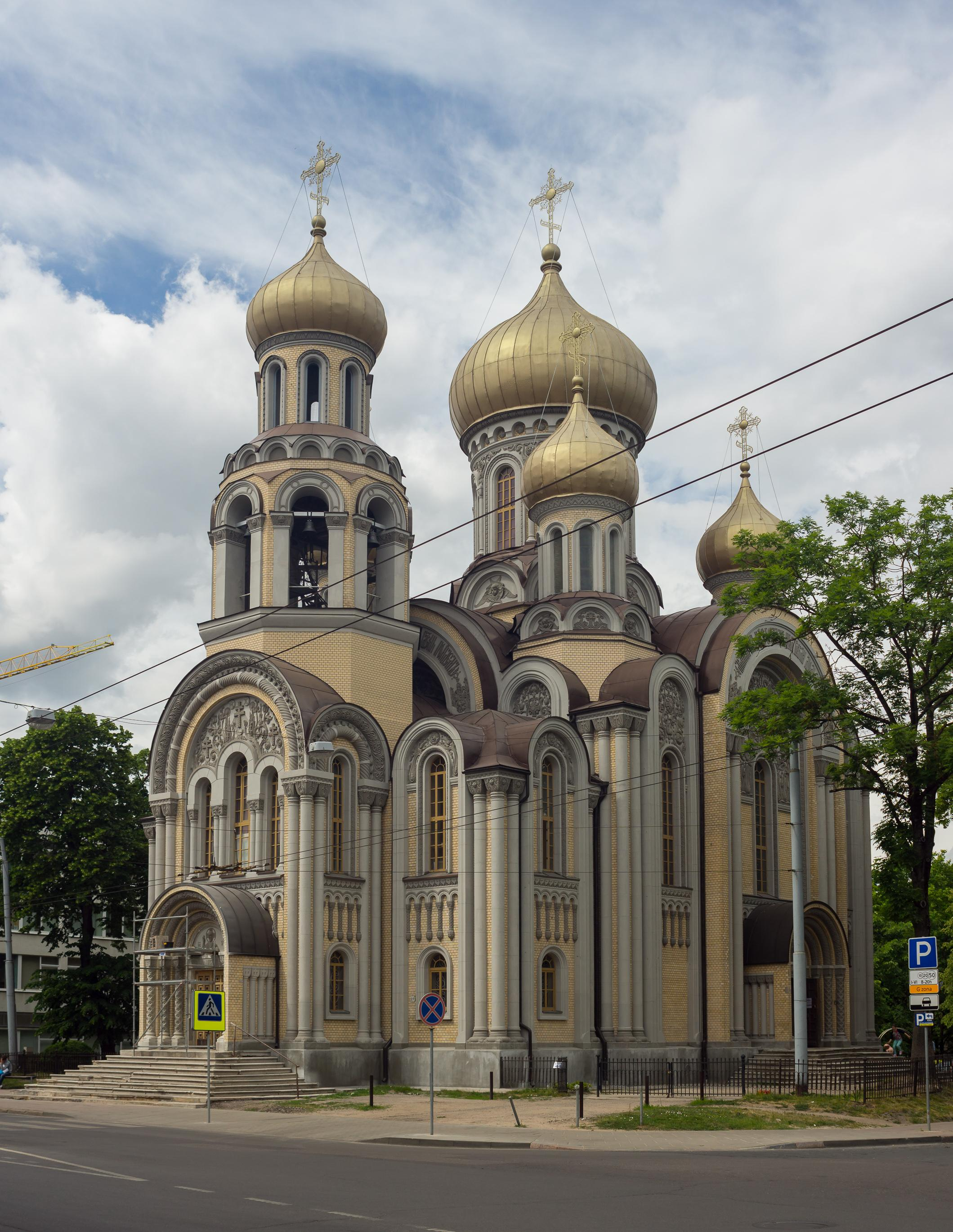
- Church of St. Constantine and St. Michael
- 54°40′55″N 25°16′6″E
- Address: Vilnius
- Country: Lithuania
- Denomination: Eastern Orthodox
- Sui iuris church: Russian Orthodox

History
- Consecrated: 13 May 1913; 113 years ago

Architecture
- Architect: Vladimir Adamovich
- Architectural type: Church
- Style: Historicism

Administration
- Diocese: Russian Orthodox Diocese of Lithuania

The Orthodox Church of St. Michael and St. Constantine (Lithuanian: Šv. Konstantino ir Michailo Cerkvė; Russian: Церковь Святых Константина и Михаила) is a Russian Orthodox church in Vilnius, Lithuania, belonging to the Russian Orthodox Diocese of Lithuania.

== History ==
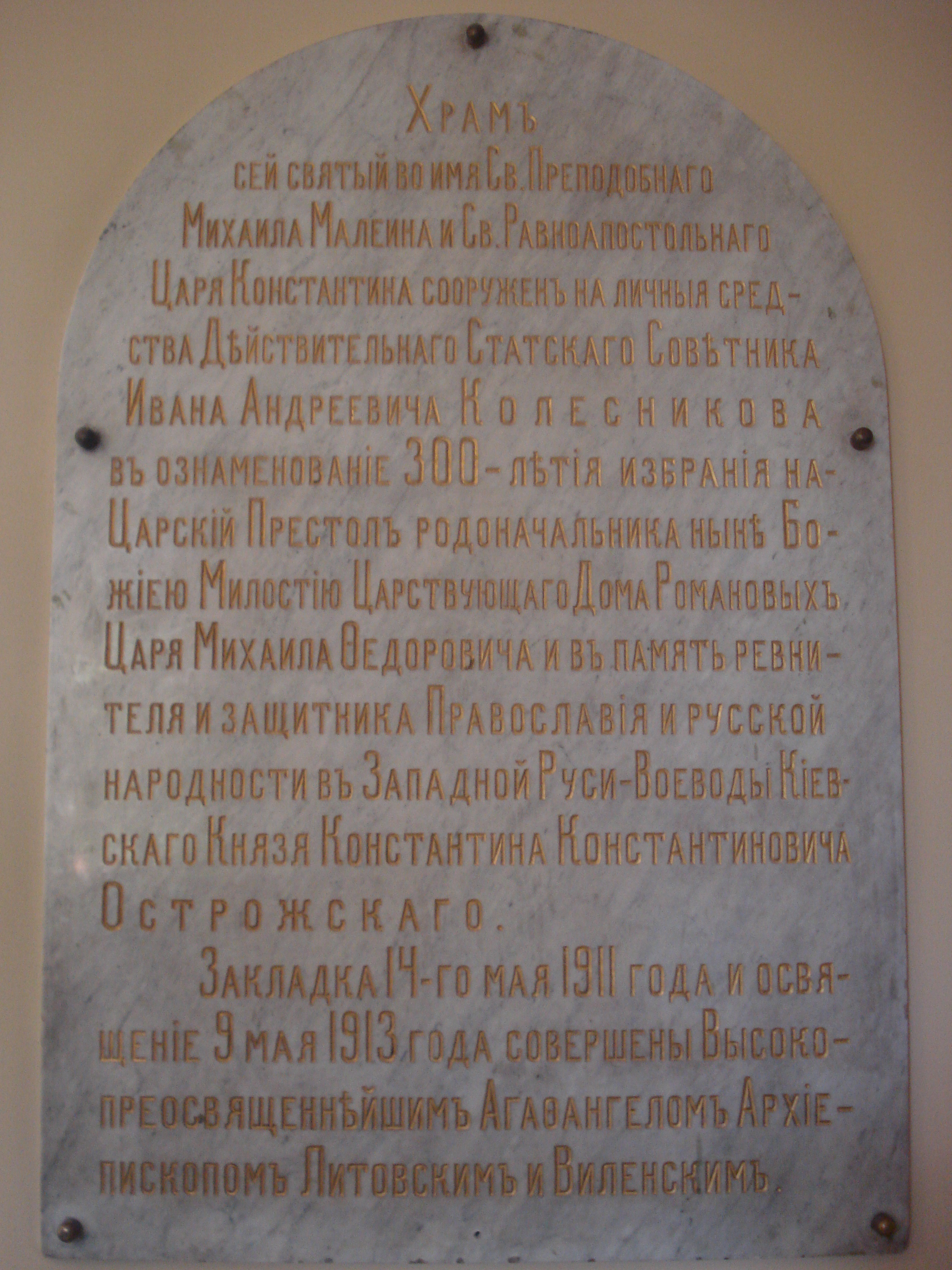
Plaque at church

It was built in 1913 to commemorate the 300th anniversary of the Romanov dynasty. The patron saints of the church are Michael Maleinos, patron saint of the Michael of Russia, the first tsar of the House of Romanov, and Constantine the Great who was the patron saint of Konstanty Ostrogski who cared for the Lithuanian Orthodox population. I. Kolupaev was the artist for the interior of the church and S.A. Sokolov designed the iconostasis. It was sponsored by I. Kolesnikov, and incorporates the Rostov and Suzdal architectural styles. On its consecration day of May 13, the church was visited by the former royal figure Grand-Duchess Elizabeth Feodorovna. She was known at the time of consecration as Sister Elizaveta and is now a martyr within the Russian Orthodox Church. During World War I, valuables from the church were sent to Russia and the interior was used as a detainment center by the Germans for civilians violating curfew. The church continued to function during Soviet occupation.
