= Soothe My Sorrows Church =

Coordinates: 51°31′48″N 46°02′09″E

- Утоли моя печали
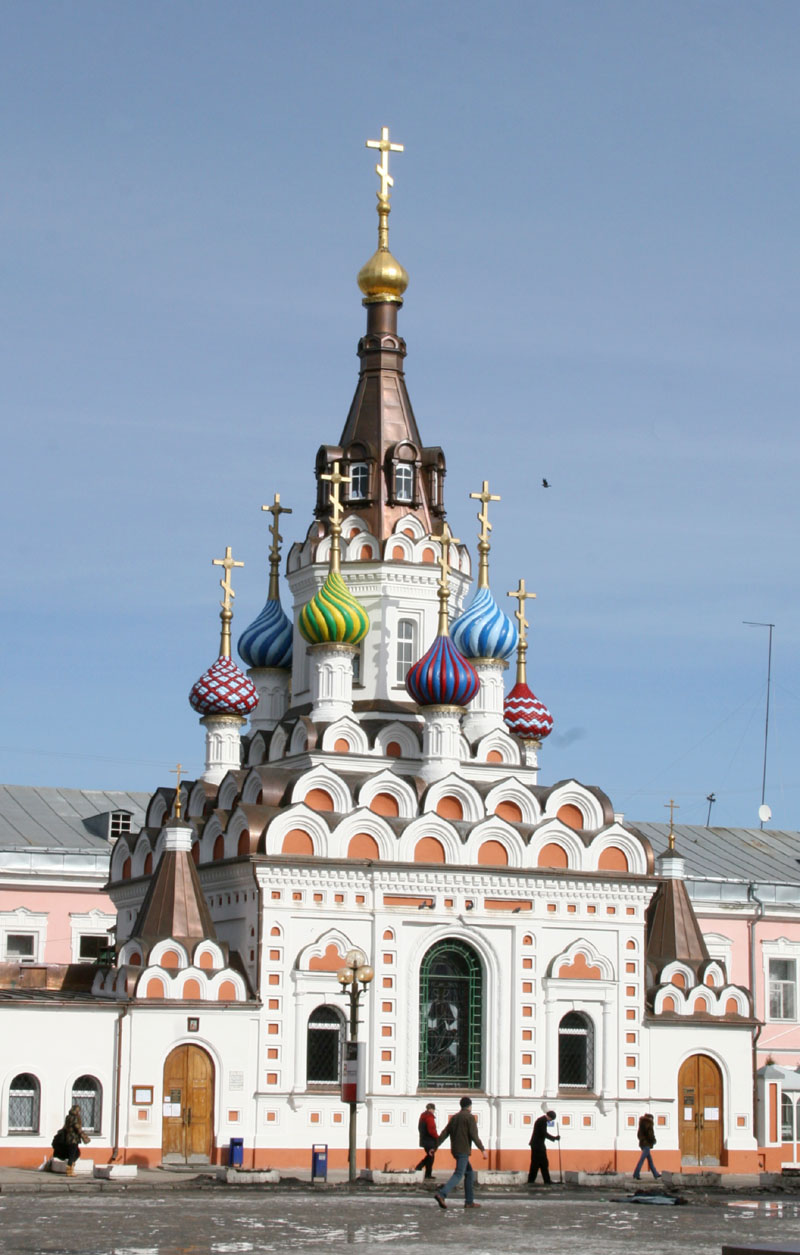
- Soothe My Sorrows Church
- Location: Saratov, Russia
- Address: Volzhskaya Street, 36
- Denomination: Eastern Orthodoxy

Architecture
- Architect: Pyotr Zybin
- Architectural type: Russian
- Years built: 1904-1906

Administration
- Diocese: Diocese of Saratov

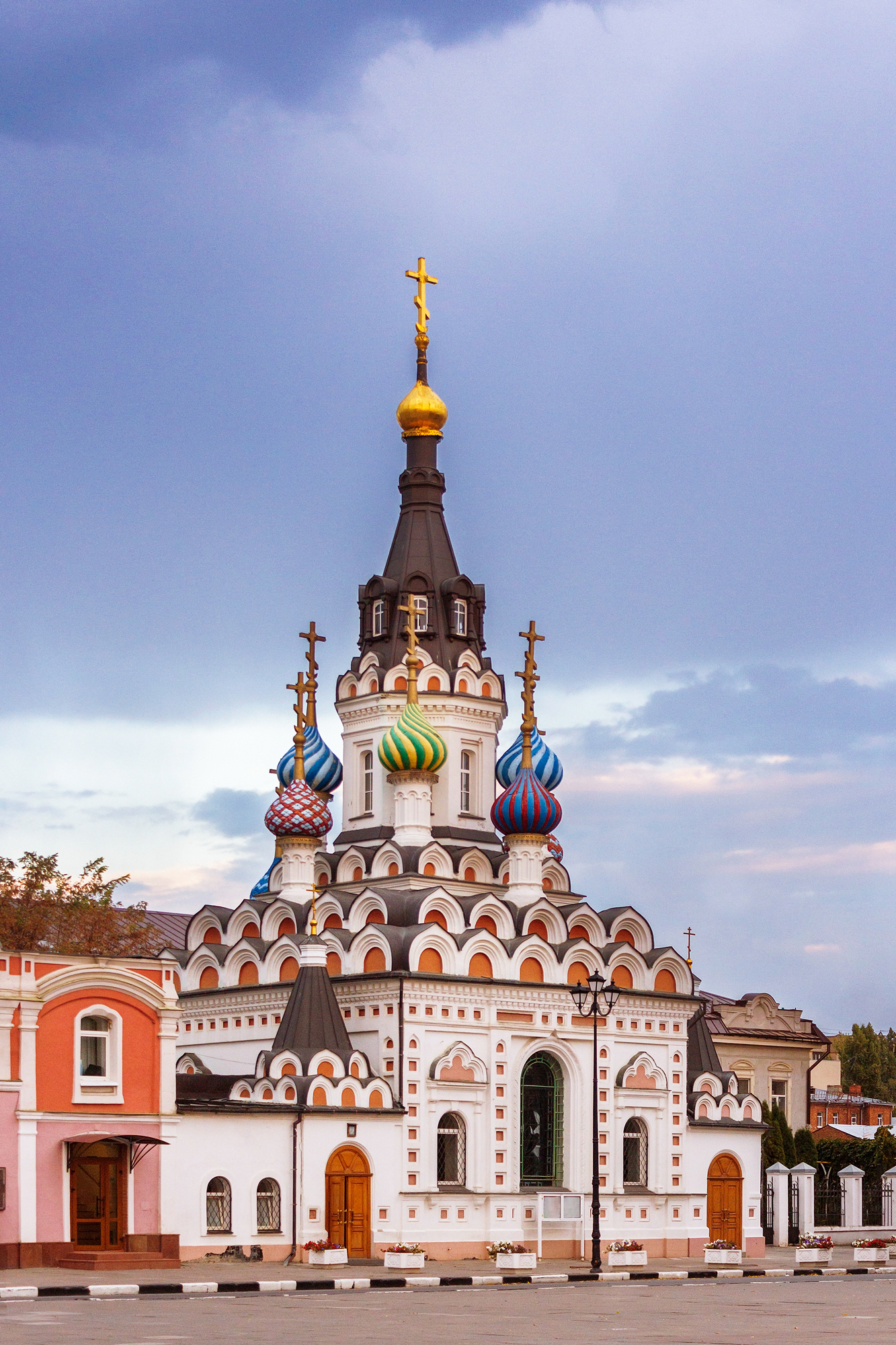
The church

Soothe My Sorrows Church (Russian: Утоли моя печали) is a Russian Orthodox church in Saratov, Russia. The church is located in the center of the city, on Volzhskaya Street and is one of the landmarks of the city.

== History ==
The church was built between 1904 and 1906. The project was designed by Pyotr Zybin and inspired by the architecture of the Saint Basil's Cathedral in Moscow.

In 1930 the church was closed, and various organizations were housed in its premises. In the 1990s the church began to be revived. Since 2007 repairs have been underway.
