= Transfiguration Cathedral (Tolyatti) =

Eastern Orthodox Cathedral in Tolyatti, Russia

Coordinates: 53°31′14.76″N 49°16′40.7″E

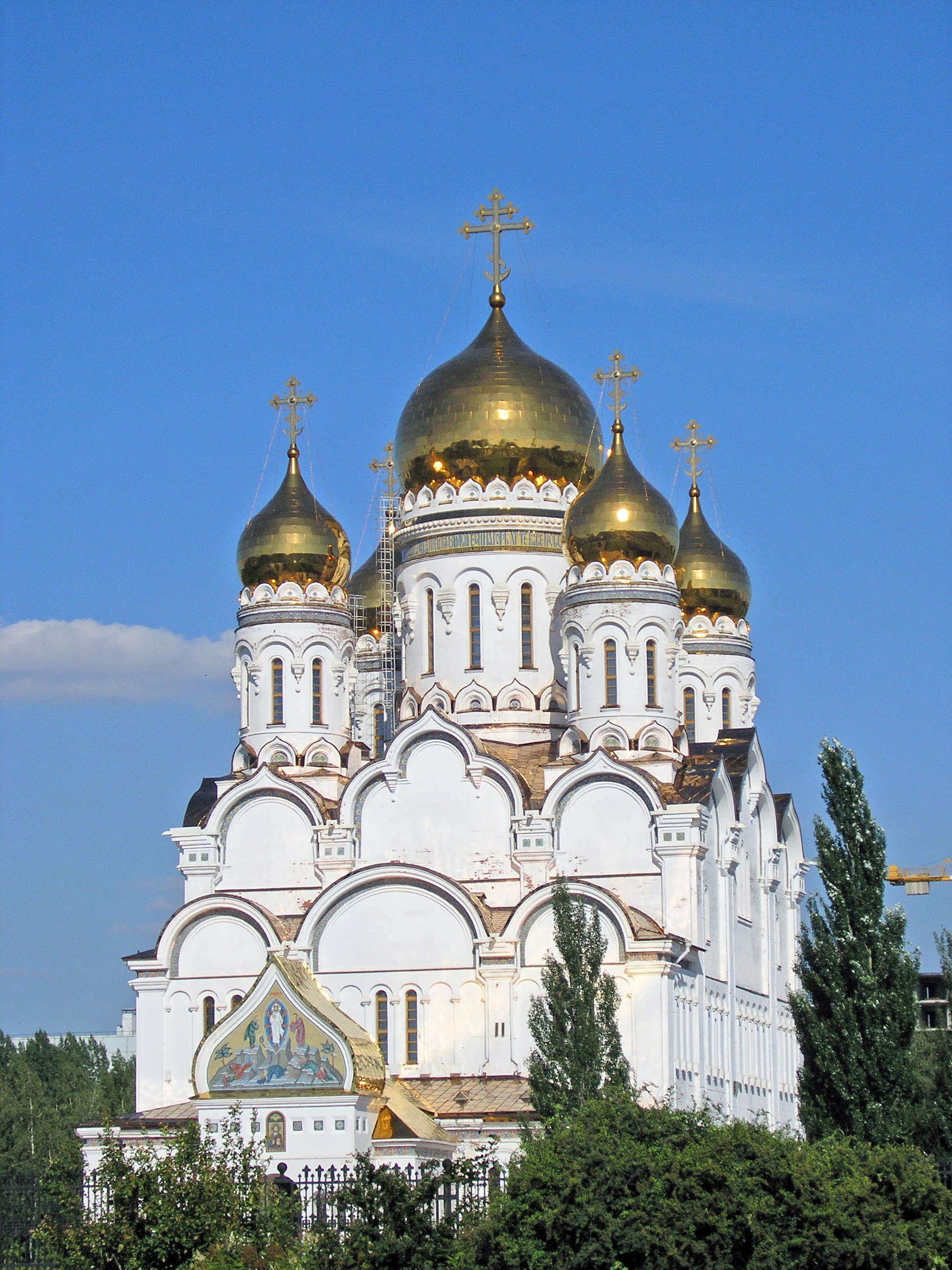
Transfiguration Cathedral, Tolyatti

The Transfiguration Cathedral (Russian: Спасо-Преображенский собор) is an Eastern Orthodox Cathedral in the Russian city of Tolyatti. Completed in 2002, it is named after the Christian Feast of the Transfiguration of the Lord, celebrated on August 19.

== Construction ==
Before the cathedral was built, services for Tolyatti's Auto Factory District were held in an ordinary flat in a conventional 16–storey apartment building on Yubileynaya (Jubilee) Street. Even then there was a sign on the door: "Cathedral of the Transfiguration". But, for services for the entire district, no more than two dozen people could be accommodated.

In August 1991 (at the same time as the 1991 Soviet coup d'état attempt was unfolding), the Tolyatti town planning council made the decision to build a temple complex consisting of a baptismal church, a bell tower, and the Transfiguration Cathedral. The original intent was to place the cathedral on the banks of the Volga, but it was later decided to build it closer to the residential areas.

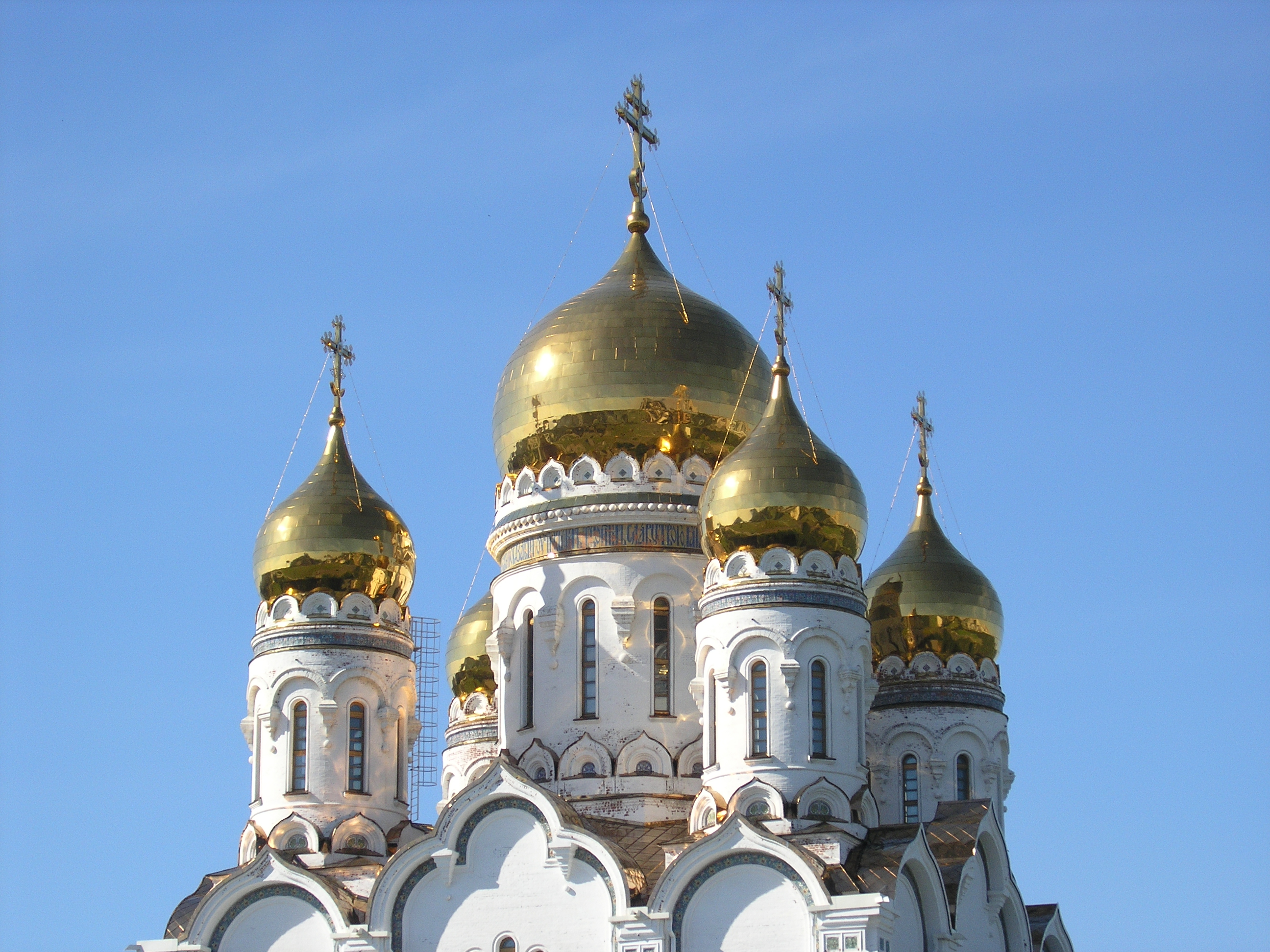
The domes

The chief architect was Dmitry Sokolo. Engineering drawings were developed by the Tolyatti companies Motor–Invest Ltd. and Hydroassembly. The construction was conducted by AvtoVAZ's Office of Capital Construction of Industrial Buildings and Structures with the direct involvement by Archpriest Valeriy Marchenko, rector of the Transfiguration Cathedral.

Construction began in June 1992 with the erection of a church in honor of John the Baptist and the residences for the clergy. The erection of the cathedral proper began in 1996 and was completed in 2002.

On August 19, 2002, Archbishop Sergius (Victor Poletkin), archbishop of the Samara and Syzran Diocese, consecrated the cathedral.

Still unbuilt, and not planned to be built for several years, is the final part of the construction – the bell tower. According to the initial draft, it will be 76 metres (249 ft) tall and will be provided with an elevator and observation deck.

== Architecture ==
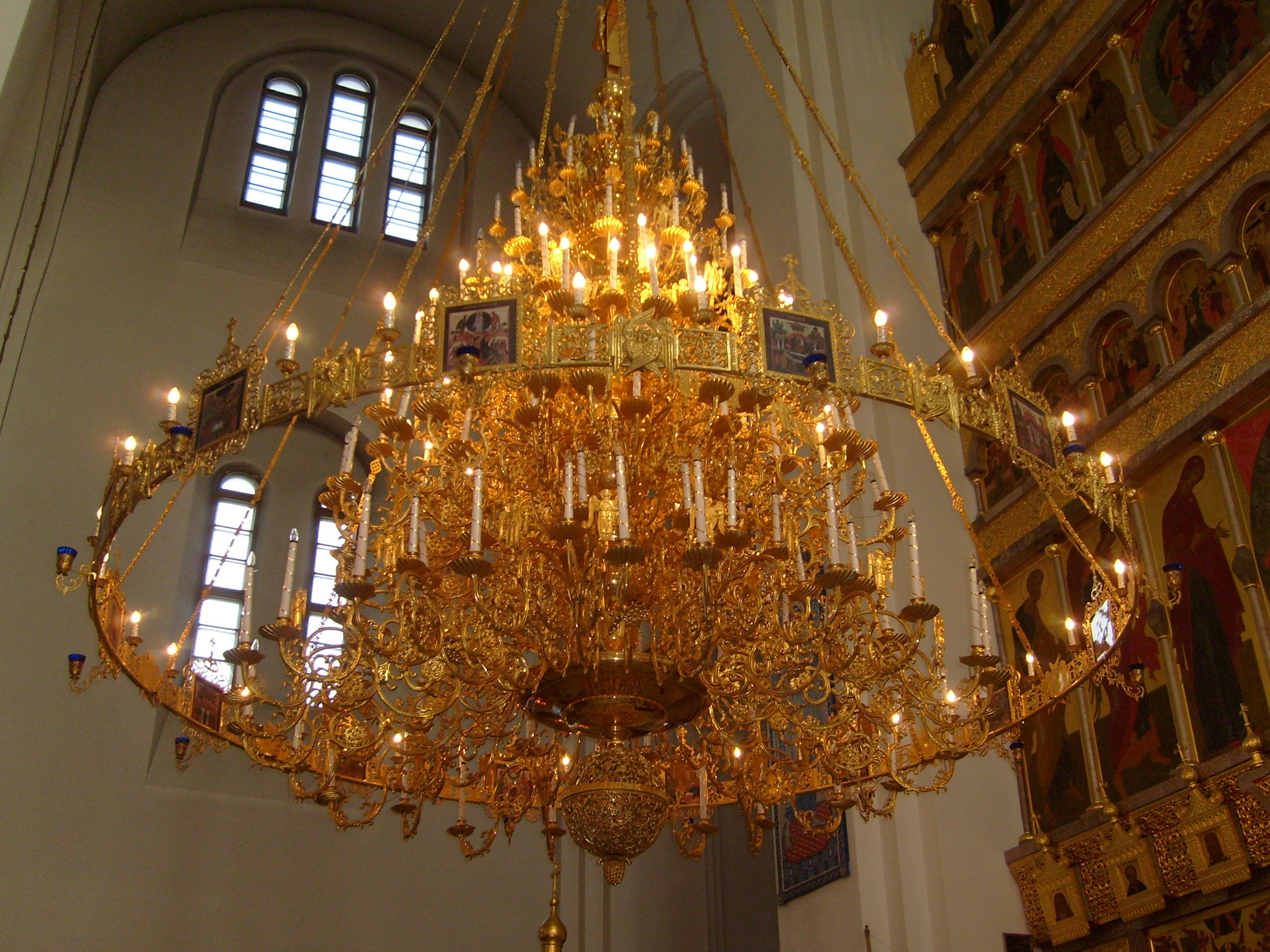
Chandelier

The usable area of the cathedral is 2,800 square metres (30,000 sq ft). The capacity exceeds 3,000 persons. The top of the main cross is 62 metres (203 ft) above ground level. The cathedral includes the main altar in honor of the Transfiguration, the southern and northern altars, choirs, and the west porch, north and south porches, and the basement. The height of the iconostasis (icon wall) at the altar is 15 metres (49 ft).

The floors are covered with mosaics of twelve kinds of marble. For the opening of the cathedral, Tolyatti jewelers provided sixteen enamel icons in silver frames. The interior and exterior are of carved oak brass fittings and grilles.

The domes are covered with gold–plated stainless steel. The crosses are made of the same material. The central dome weighs 26 tons; its construction required the use of a special custom crane.

The building is very modern from an engineering standpoint: the cathedral is equipped with radio broadcasting equipment, ventilation systems, a fire and burglar alarm system and other communications equipment, and outdoor floodlights.

== Activities ==
In July 2006, the cathedral hosted one of the most important relics in the Christian world, the supposed right hand of John the Baptist.
