= St. Peter and Paul Church, Luxembourg =

Coordinates: 49°36′51″N 6°07′09″E

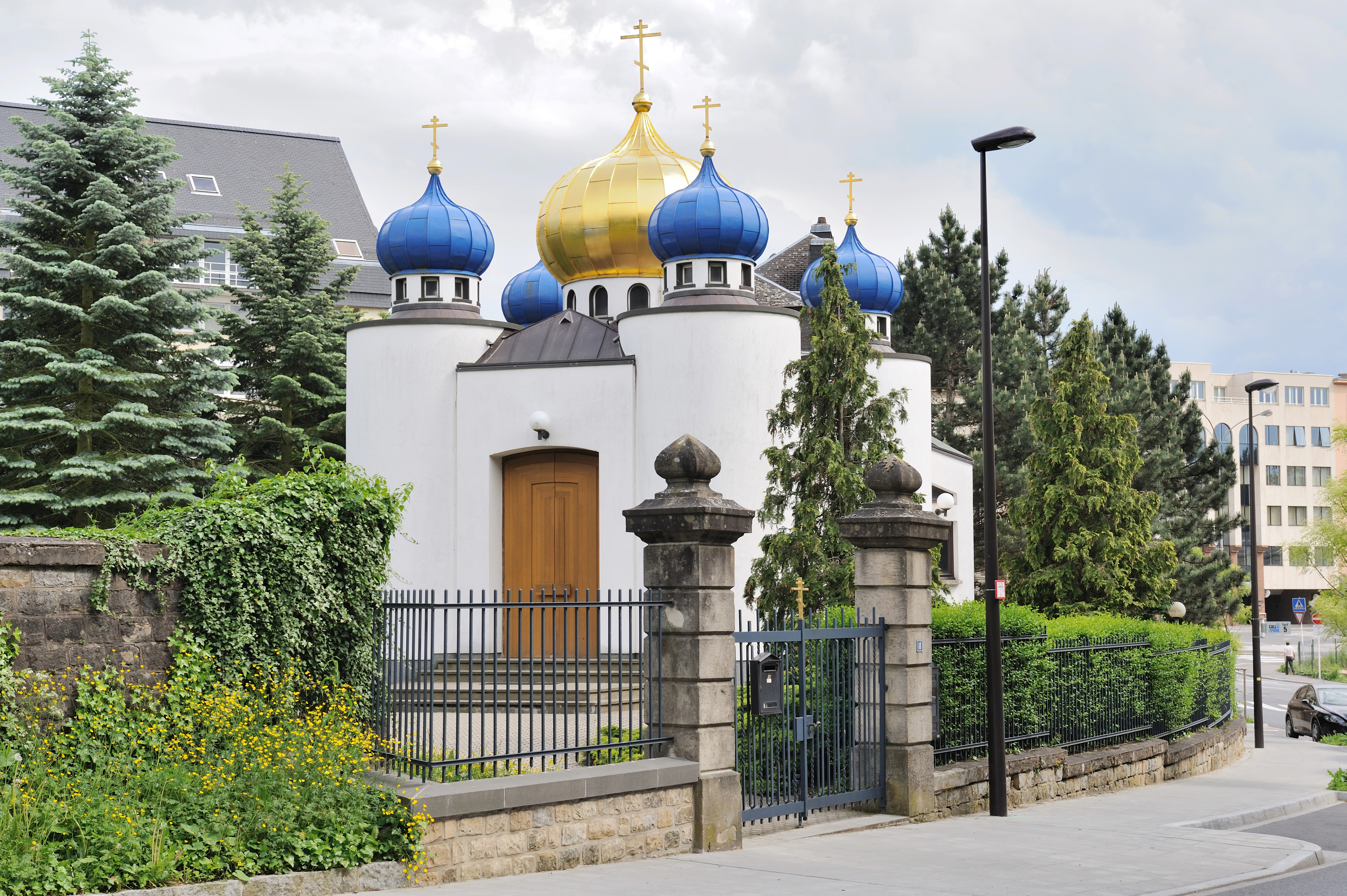
The Russian Orthodox Church in Luxembourg City

Church of the Saints Peter and Paul (Luxembourgish: Russesch-orthodox Péiter-a-Paul Kierch zu Lëtzebuerg; French: Église des Saints Apôtres Pierre et Paul de Luxembourg) is the first Russian Orthodox Church in Luxembourg. It is under the jurisdiction of the Western European Diocese of the Russian Orthodox Church Outside Russia.

== History ==
The first Russian settlers, according to various estimates between 120 and 300 people, arrived in Luxembourg from Bulgaria, Italy and Turkey in 1927. They were mostly the remains of part of General Lavr Kornilov. Professional military men were forced to beat swords into plowshares, remove the officer's uniform jacket and put on workers to start a new life in a foreign land, where only the work in the quarry or the factory could feed his families. Among the newcomers in the towns Mertert and Wiltz was not a priest, but had faith. Faith is not only in God, Tsar and Fatherland, but also the belief in the imminent return to his former life, home. In 1928 they founded a Russian orthodox parish to be able to pray fervently about it. First of all tried to build a house of worship, arranged initially in the barracks. Captain Evgeny Treschin, whose family remained in Russia, took over after the necessary training, conducting worship services. Kornilov Regiment always had a choir, so immediately found the singers for church choir. The owner of the most beautiful voice was regent Captain Roman Puch.

In 1975, with the permission of the local authorities has been obtained a plot of land. In 1979 Archbishop Anthony (Bartoshevich) laid the first stone of the church. Son of Captain Roman Puch priest Sergey Puch after return from USA began to build the St. Peter and Paul Church. The building has been built mainly on facilities Sergey Puch, local parishioners and assistance from Geneva.

The temple was consecrated on 12 July 1982 in honor of the Holy Apostles St. Peter and St. Paul.
