= St. John the Theologian Church =

Historic church in Alaska, United States

- U.S. National Register of Historic Places
- Alaska Heritage Resources Survey
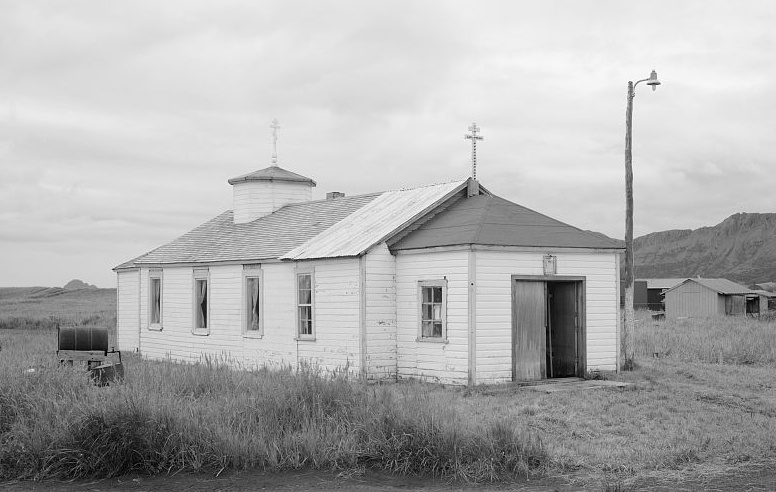

- Location within Alaska
- Location: Corner of B Street and 2nd Avenue, Perryville, Alaska
- Coordinates: 55°54′42″N 159°08′43″W
- Area: less than one acre
- MPS: Russian Orthodox Church Buildings and Sites TR
- NRHP reference No.: 80000741
- AHRS No.: XSB-003

Significant dates
- Added to NRHP: June 6, 1980
- Designated AHRS: May 18, 1973

The St. John the Theologian Church is a historic Russian Orthodox church in Perryville, Alaska, United States, that was listed on the National Register of Historic Places in 1980. It is now under the Diocese of Alaska of the Orthodox Church in America.

Named for St. John the Theologian, it was built soon after Perryville was founded in 1912, by survivors from the community of Katmai, Alaska, after it was destroyed in the 1912 Katmai volcano eruption. The church is 57.5 feet (17.5 m) in length and consists of traditional Alaskan R.O. church compartments of vestibule, nave, and altar chamber.
