= Nativity of Our Lord Chapel =

Historic church in Alaska, United States

- U.S. National Register of Historic Places
- Alaska Heritage Resources Survey
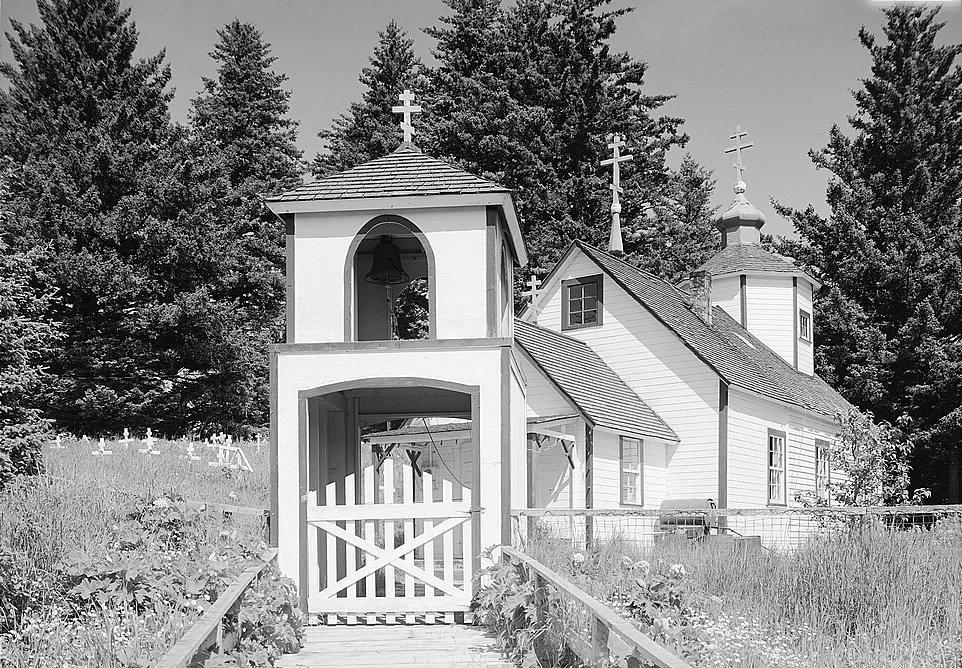

- Location within Alaska
- Location: Church Street, Ouzinkie, Alaska
- Coordinates: 57°55′23″N 152°30′1″W
- Area: less than one acre
- Built: 1906
- Built by: Various Ouzinkie villagers
- MPS: Russian Orthodox Church Buildings and Sites TR
- NRHP reference No.: 80004582
- AHRS No.: KOD-193

Significant dates
- Added to NRHP: June 6, 1980
- Designated AHRS: May 18, 1973

The Nativity of Our Lord Chapel (Russian: Церковь Рождества Христова) is a historic Russian Orthodox church located in Church Street, Ouzinkie, Alaska. It is now under the Diocese of Alaska of the Orthodox Church in America.

The current building was built in 1906 as a replacement to an older, adjacent building from 1849 or 1855 that was left to deteriorate. Its design was based on that of the 1888 Russian Orthodox church at Karluk, which itself was based upon the church at Belkofski. This church has a relatively larger onion dome, though the onion dome is still small.

It was added to the National Register of Historic Places in 1980.

== See also ==
- National Register of Historic Places listings in Kodiak Island Borough, Alaska
