= Belkofski, Alaska =

Unincorporated community in the state of Alaska, United States

Belkofski, Alaska Taxtamax̂
- Alaska Native Village
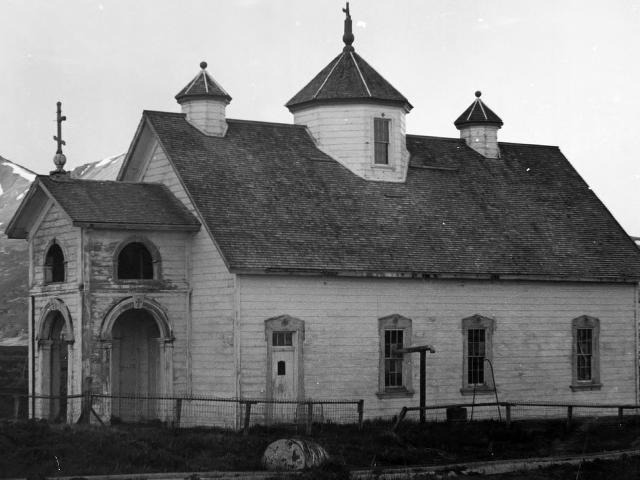
- Exterior of Holy Resurrection Russian Orthodox Church

- Location in Alaska
- Coordinates: 55°05′20″N 162°01′50″W
- Country: United States
- State: Alaska
- Borough: Aleutians East
- Elevation: 102 ft (31 m)

Population (2010)
  - Total: 0
- Time zone: UTC-9 (Alaska (AKST))
  - Summer (DST): UTC-8 (AKDT)
- ZIP code: 99571
- Area code: 907 (local prefix: 532)
- FIPS code: 02-05970
- GNIS feature ID: 1418210

Belkofski (Aleut: Taxtamax̂; Russian: Белкофский) is an abandoned unincorporated community and Alaska Native Village Statistical Area (ANVSA) in Aleutians East Borough, Alaska. It has been uninhabited since the 1980s, reporting a population of 0 in 1990, 2000 and 2010.

== Location ==
Belkofski is on a point at the eastern end of the Alaska Peninsula, 12 miles southeast of King Cove.

== History ==
Russians originally invaded Aleuts at Belkofski in 1823 to harvest sea otters in the area; at its height, it was the area's most important village. It was called "S(elo) Belkovskoe" from "belka," meaning "squirrel." In the 1880s, three stores were constructed, which were stocked with goods from San Francisco. There was a Russian Orthodox Holy Resurrection church built at that time as well. When the sea otter population diminished, so did the population. The economy switched to trapping wild game, and many of Belkofski’s inhabitants would move to the neighboring communities of Sand Point, Alaska and King Cove. The final few inhabitants vacated Belkofski for King Cove in the 1980s, bringing everything with them and establishing a new Orthodox Church.

The village’s abandoned buildings reportedly burned down in 2013.

== Demographics ==
Historical population
Census	Pop.	Note	%±
1880	268		—
1890	185		−31.0%
1900	147		−20.5%
1920	129		—
1930	123		−4.7%
1940	140		13.8%
1950	119		−15.0%
1960	57		−52.1%
1970	59		3.5%
1980	10		−83.1%
1990	0		−100.0%
2000	0		—
2010	0		—
U.S. Decennial Census

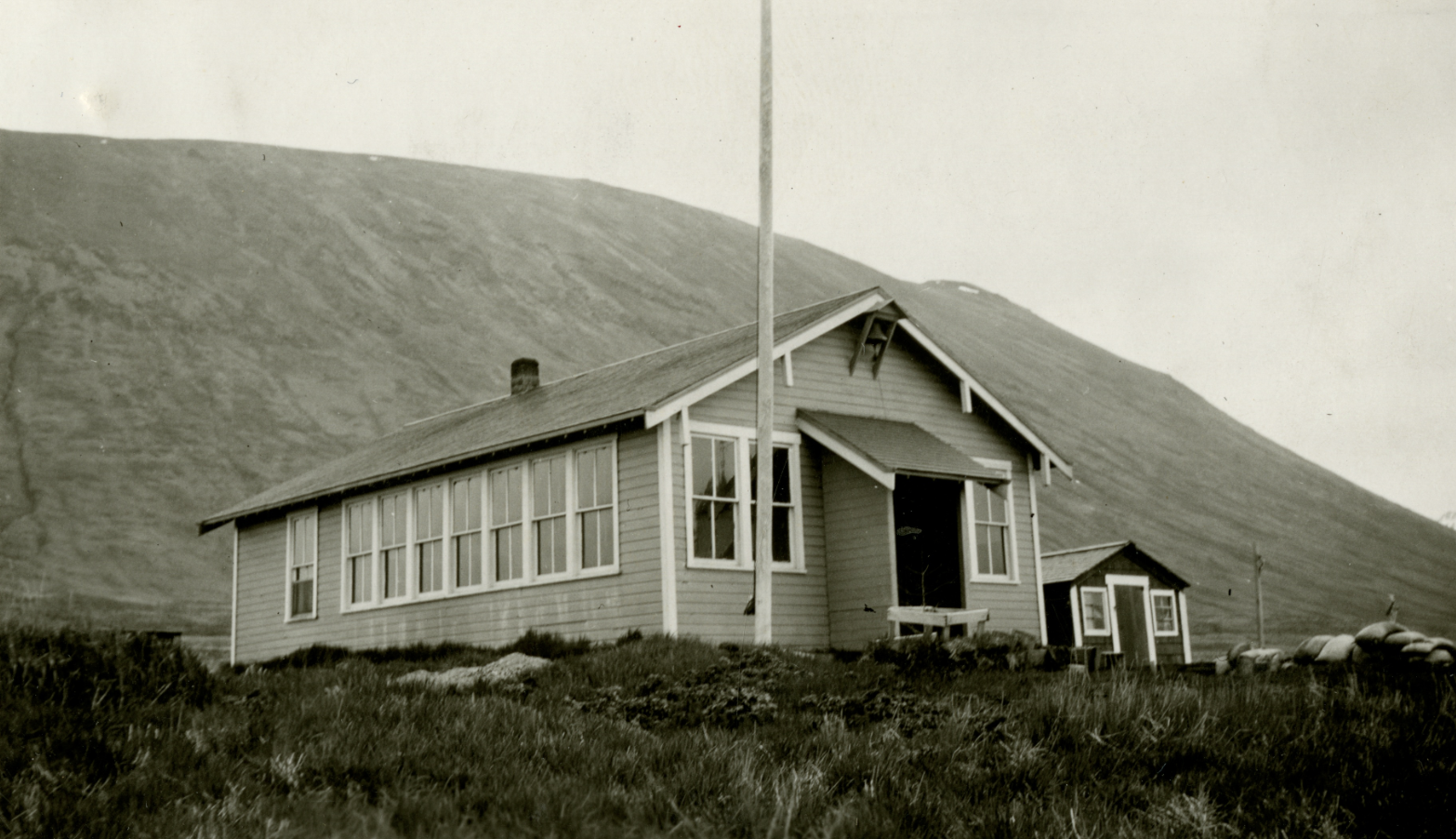
Belkofski schoolhouse, circa 1932

Belkofski first appeared on the 1880 U.S. Census as the unincorporated village of Belkovsky with 268 residents (making it the 25th largest community in the Alaska Territory). It appeared as "Belkovsky" in 1890, as Belkofski Village in 1900, it did not report in 1910, and as Belkofski from 1920-1970, with the exception of 1940 when it was erroneously reported as "Balkofski." Beginning in 1980, it was classified as an "Alaska Native Village" and from 1990 through 2010 censuses as an Alaska Native Village Statistical Area (ANVSA), but on the last three censuses has reported a population of zero.

== Climate ==
The area is in a maritime climate zone. Temperatures range from −13 to 78 °F (−25 to 26 °C). Average snowfall is 56 inches (1,400 mm), with an annual precipitation of 33 inches (840 mm) a year.

== Elevation ==
Generally 85 feet (26 m) above sea level.
