= Church of St. Paraskevi, Novgorod =

Church of St. Paraskevi
- Церковь Параскевы-Пятницы на Торгу
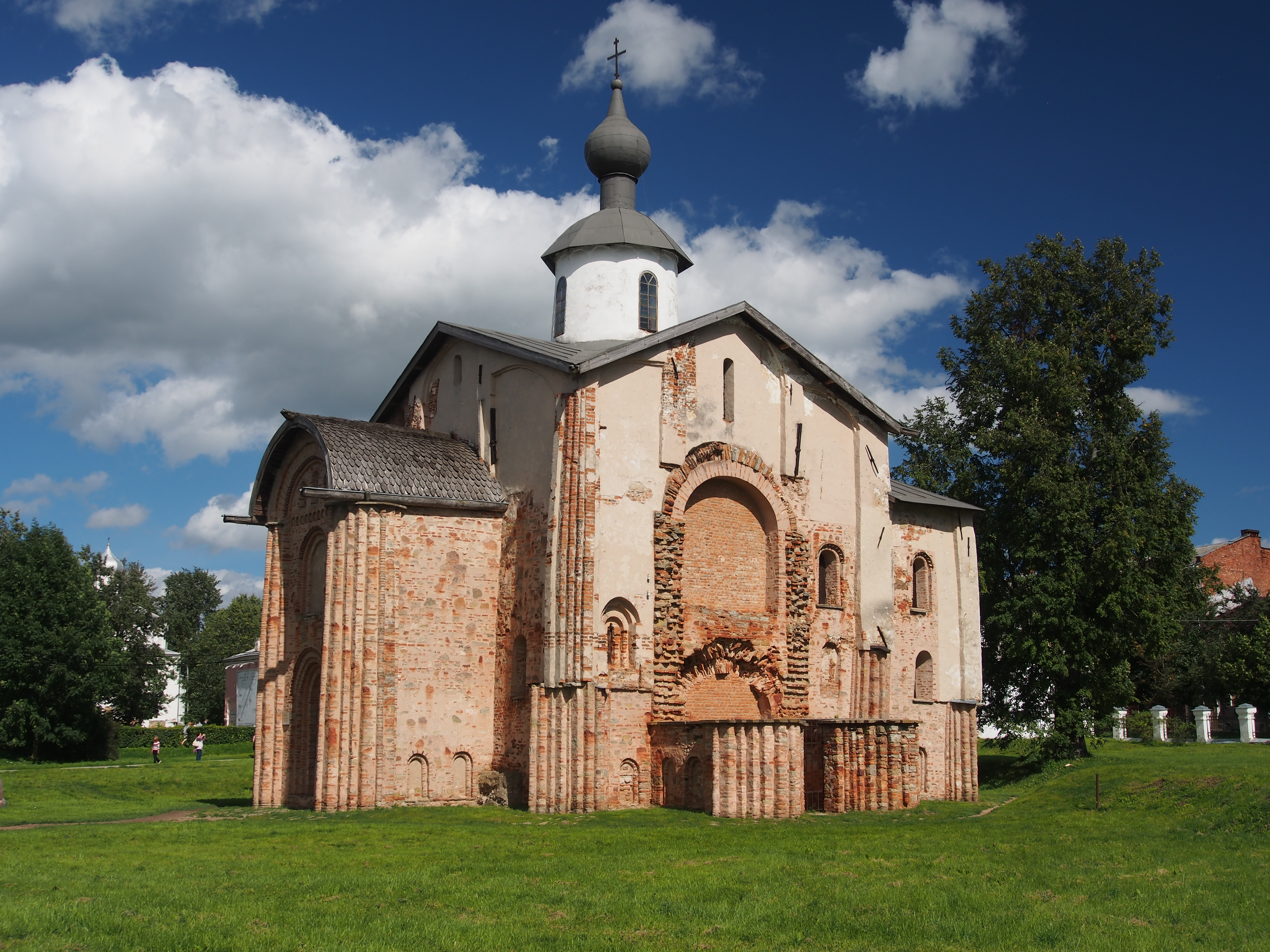
- Church of St. Paraskevi
- 58°31′06″N 31°17′08″E
- Location: Veliky Novgorod
- Country: Russia
- Denomination: Russian Orthodox

History
- Dedication: Paraskevi of Iconium

Architecture
- Style: Novgorod architecture
- Completed: 1207

Church of St. Paraskevi (Russian: Церковь Параскевы-Пятницы на Торгу, Tserkov Paraskevy Pyatnitsy na Torgu) in Veliky Novgorod is one of Russia's oldest churches, dating from 1207. The church is located at the city center, at the former Yaroslav's Court and the market square. It is currently a museum.

The Church of St. Paraskevi is on the World Heritage list as a part of object 604 Historic Monuments of Novgorod and Surroundings. The building was designated an architectural monument of federal significance (#5310046012).

== History ==
The church was built in 1207 by Novgorod merchants. Saint Paraskevi was the patron saint of the association of merchants who carried out overseas trade. Church of St. Paraskevi is one of the few survived churches in Russia which were built in the beginning of the 13th century. Previously, at least two different wooden Saint Paraskevi churches were standing at the same place, one constructed in 1156 and the second one in 1191.

The church was rebuilt several times. In particular, the dome was made in the 18th century. Between 1954 and the 2000s, the church was extensively restored, and the early walls were uncovered.

== Architecture ==
This is a small crossed dome church with three naves and four pillars. The walls are constructed of plinthite and limestone.

The church does not have close analogs with other contemporary Novgorod buildings, however, it is in many respects similar to the Saint Michael Church in Smolensk. It is presumed that the Saint Paraskevi Church was built by Smolensk masters. The decorative elements used in the design of the church were however taken over by Novgorod architects and became common in Novgorod ecclesiastical architecture of the 14th and the 15th centuries.
