= St. Nicholas Chapel (Igiugig, Alaska) =

Historic church in Alaska, United States

- U.S. National Register of Historic Places
- Alaska Heritage Resources Survey
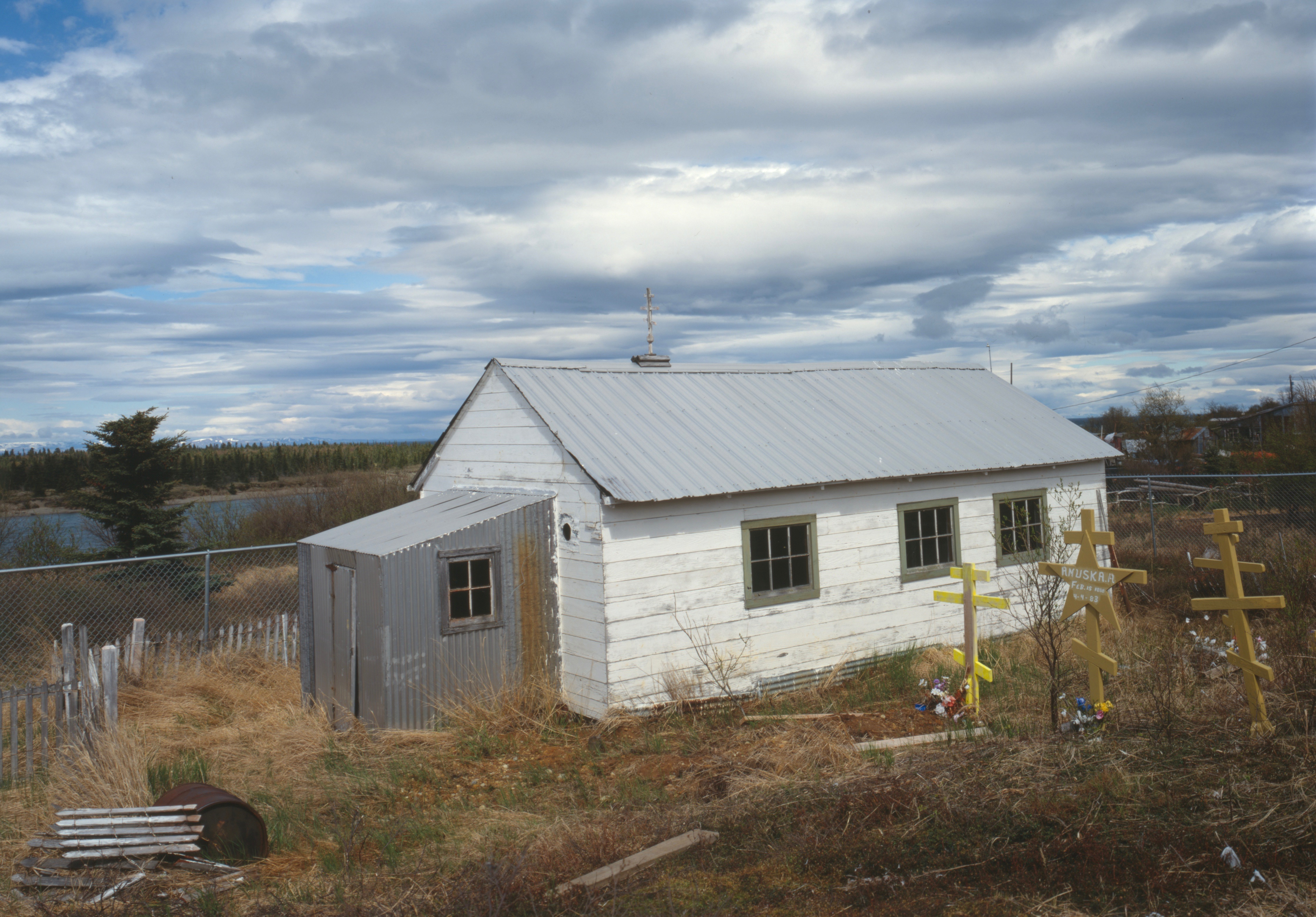
- HABS photo, 1990

- Location within Alaska
- Location: Along Main Road, Igiugig, Alaska
- Coordinates: 59°19′37″N 155°53′42″W
- Area: less than one acre
- Built: 1930
- MPS: Russian Orthodox Church Buildings and Sites TR
- NRHP reference No.: 80004579
- AHRS No.: ILI-042

Significant dates
- Added to NRHP: June 6, 1980
- Designated AHRS: May 18, 1973

The St. Nicholas Chapel is a historic Russian Orthodox church in the native village of Igiugig, Alaska, United States. It is now under the Diocese of Alaska of the Orthodox Church in America.

It is one of the region's smallest churches, measuring 12 by 18 feet (3.7 m × 5.5 m), with clapboard siding, a metal gable roof, and a small shed-roof vestibule at one end. The long walls each have three sash windows. A detached bell tower, holding five bells, stands next to the church. The church was built in 1930. The vestibule has seen the addition of a little onion dome sometime after 1990.

The church was listed on the National Register of Historic Places in 1980.

== See also ==
- National Register of Historic Places listings in Lake and Peninsula Borough, Alaska
