= Transfiguration of Our Lord Chapel =

Historic Russian Orthodox church in Nushagak, Alaska, United States

- U.S. National Register of Historic Places
- Alaska Heritage Resources Survey
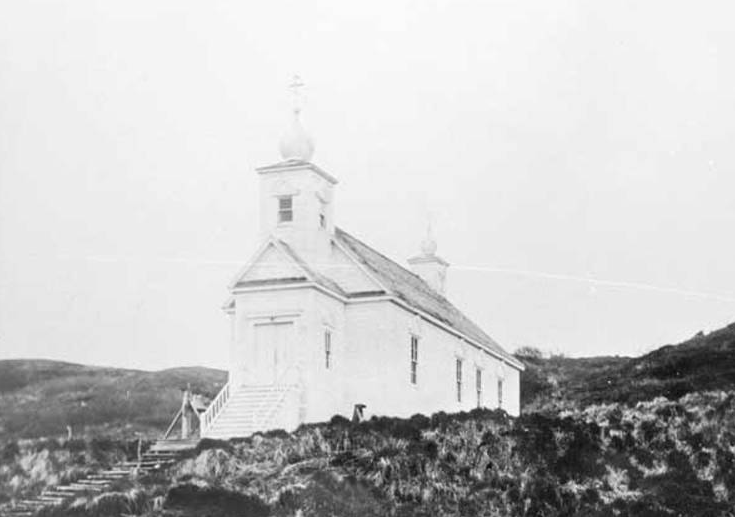
- Early 20th-century photo

- Location within Alaska
- Location: In Nushagak, Alaska
- Coordinates: 58°56′47″N 158°29′27″W
- Area: less than one acre
- Built: 1904
- MPS: Russian Orthodox Church Buildings and Sites TR
- NRHP reference No.: 80000752
- AHRS No.: XNB-012

Significant dates
- Added to NRHP: June 6, 1980
- Designated AHRS: May 18, 1973

The Transfiguration of Our Lord Chapel is a historic Russian Orthodox church in Nushagak, Alaska, United States. This now-abandoned building was erected in 1904 and was the third Russian Orthodox church to be built on this site, following earlier ones dating to the 1820s and 1860. Although this church has obvious Russian Orthodox features (most notably the onion dome atop the tower), it would not otherwise look out of place in a traditional New England village.

The church was listed on the National Register of Historic Places in 1980.

== See also ==
- National Register of Historic Places listings in Dillingham Census Area, Alaska
