= Holy Resurrection Church (Belkofski, Alaska) =

Historic church in Alaska, United States

- U.S. National Register of Historic Places
- Alaska Heritage Resources Survey
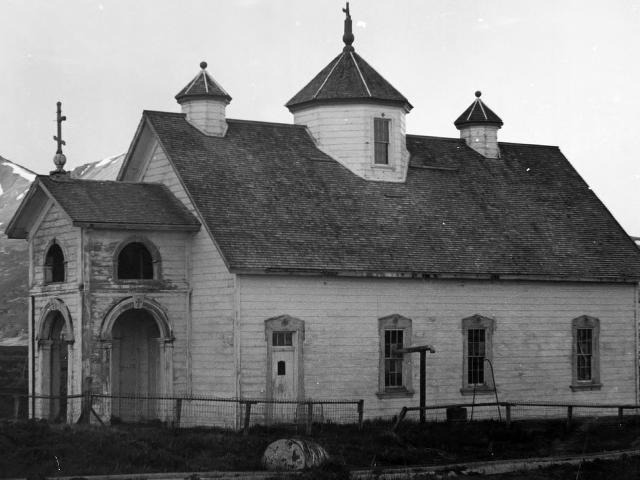
- Exterior of church

- Location within Alaska
- Location: Belkofski, Alaska
- Coordinates: 55°5′13″N 162°1′56″W
- Area: less than one acre
- Architectural style: Eclectic Byzant./Russ./Alas.
- MPS: Russian Orthodox Church Buildings and Sites TR
- NRHP reference No.: 80000739
- AHRS No.: XCB-020

Significant dates
- Added to NRHP: June 6, 1980
- Designated AHRS: May 18, 1973

The Holy Resurrection Church (Russian: Церковь Воскресения Христова) in Belkofski, Alaska, is a historic Russian Orthodox church.

It is significant as "a striking example of a special type of Russian Orthodox Church architectural heritage", with a pyramidal-shaped roof over a central tower, in a design following from the 1732 design of the Church of the Resurrection on the Moskva River at Kolomenskoye, near Moscow, Russia. It is believed that there has been a church at this site since 1881; the current church may be a reconstruction.

The church's design had an impact on the later Russian Orthodox churches at Karluk in 1888 and Ouzinkie in 1906.

It was listed on the National Register of Historic Places in 1980.

Gradually the residents of Belkofski moved to nearby villages which offered them new economic opportunities. In the 1980s, a new Orthodox church was built in King Cove, located twelve miles away by boat. The church's inventory, which includes an iconostasis containing numerous icons from Russia, was transferred there.

== See also ==
- National Register of Historic Places listings in Aleutians East Borough, Alaska
