= St. Nicholas Chapel (Seldovia, Alaska) =

Historic Russian Orthodox church in Seldovia, Alaska, United States

- U.S. National Register of Historic Places
- Alaska Heritage Resources Survey
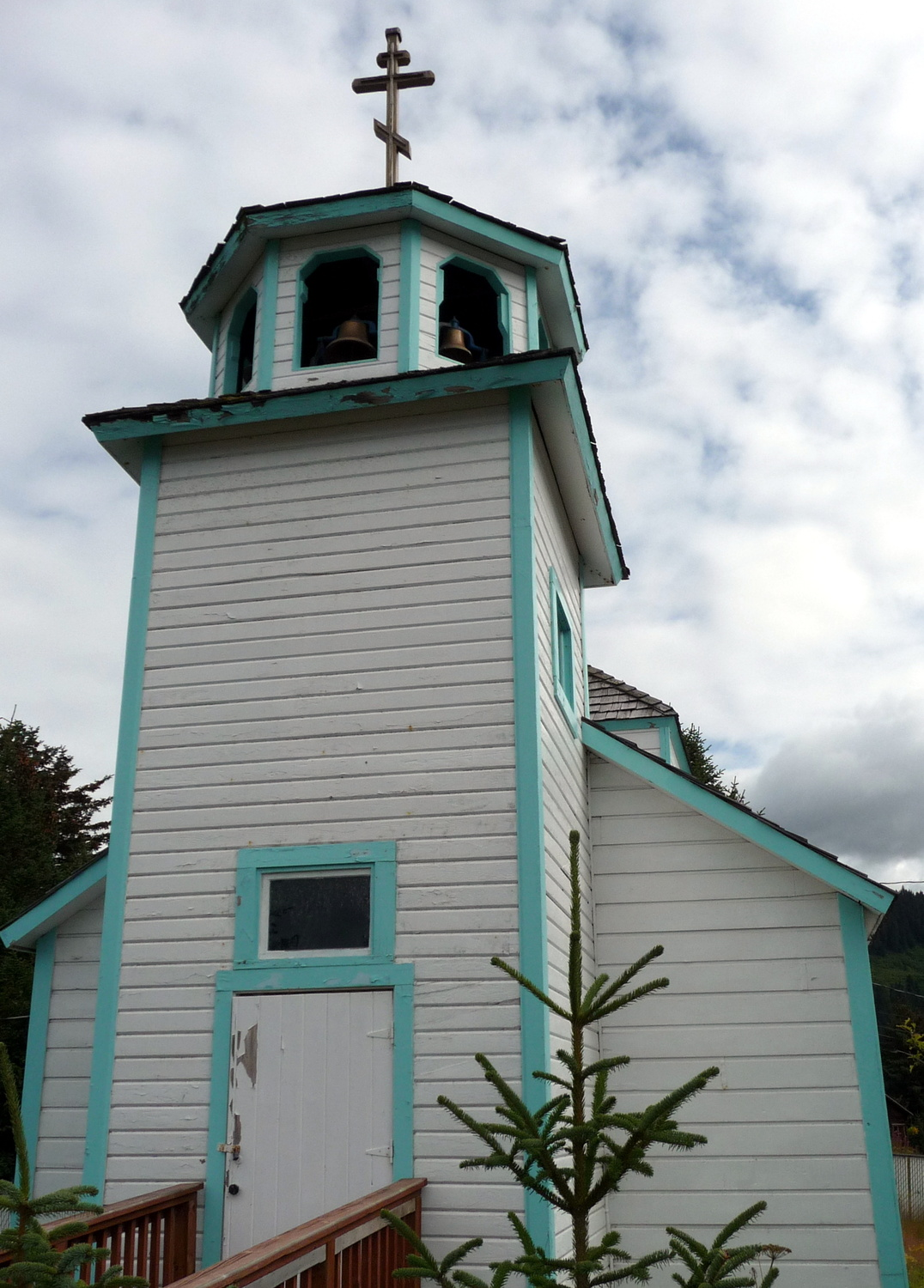

- Location within Alaska
- Location: Church Street, Seldovia, Alaska
- Coordinates: 59°26′22″N 151°42′59″W
- Area: less than one acre
- MPS: Russian Orthodox Church Buildings and Sites TR
- NRHP reference No.: 80004588
- AHRS No.: SEL-023

Significant dates
- Added to NRHP: June 6, 1980
- Designated AHRS: May 18, 1973

St. Nicholas Chapel (Russian: Церковь Николая Чудотворца), commonly known as Russian Orthodox Church, is a historic Russian Orthodox church in Seldovia, Alaska, United States. The church was most likely built in 1891 and replaced a log church. It is now under Diocese of Alaska of the Orthodox Church in America.

The church's design features a bell tower with an octagonal, partly open belfry; the tower is topped by a tall cross. The church has a gable roof with a four-sided cupola in the middle, which is topped by another cross.

The chapel was added to the National Register of Historic Places in 1980.

== See also ==
- National Register of Historic Places listings in Kenai Peninsula Borough, Alaska
