= Ascension of Our Lord Chapel =

Historic church in Alaska, United States

- U.S. National Register of Historic Places
- Alaska Heritage Resources Survey
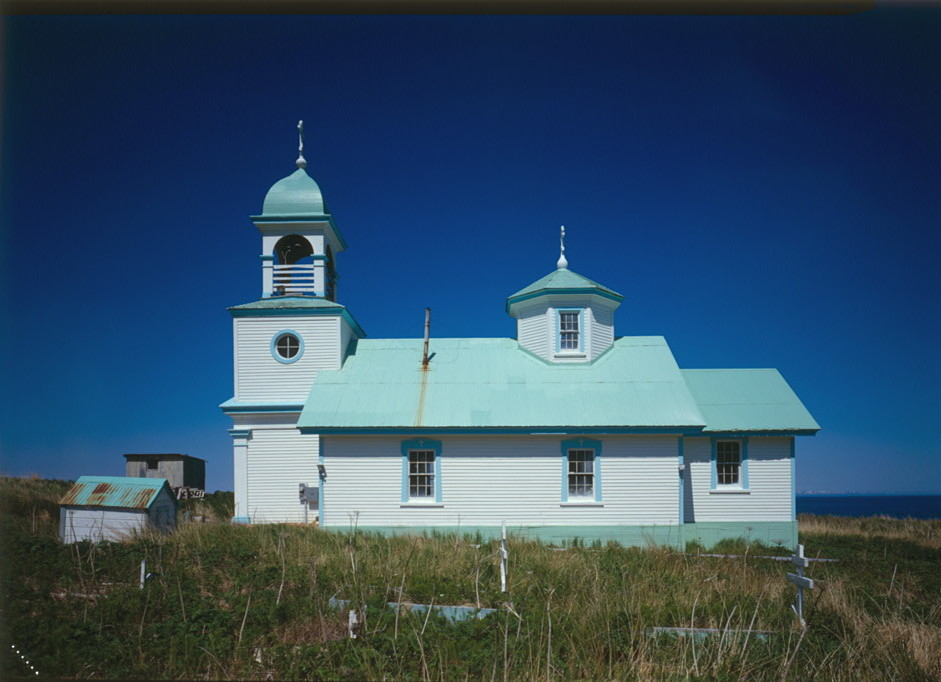
- The Ascension of Our Lord Chapel, 2013

- Location within Alaska
- Location: Karluk, Alaska
- Coordinates: 57°34′9″N 154°27′30″W
- Area: less than one acre
- Built: 1888
- Built by: Charles Smith Hursh
- MPS: Russian Orthodox Church Buildings and Sites TR
- NRHP reference No.: 80004580
- AHRS No.: KAR-032

Significant dates
- Added to NRHP: June 6, 1980
- Designated AHRS: May 18, 1973

The Ascension of Our Lord Chapel (Russian: Вознесение Часовни Господа нашего) is a historic Russian Orthodox chapel in Karluk, Alaska. It is now under the Diocese of Alaska of the Orthodox Church in America.

It is believed that an original church was built in Karluk in the 1700s. The current church was built in 1888, with design and building "attributed to one Charles Smith Hursh". Its architecture shared some with its contemporary Russian Orthodox church at Belkofski, but has "a more fully realized design for a small church, embodying eclectic features of one main stream of R. O. rural church design."

Its design was largely copied in the design of the Nativity of Our Lord Chapel in Ouzinkie, Alaska.

The church was listed on the National Register of Historic Places in 1980.

In 2021, the church was relocated from a bluff overlooking the river to prevent its destruction.

== See also ==
- National Register of Historic Places listings in Kodiak Island Borough, Alaska
