= St. Andrew's Cathedral, Philadelphia =

Russian Orthodox cathedral in Philadelphia

Coordinates: 39.9635°N 75.1464°W

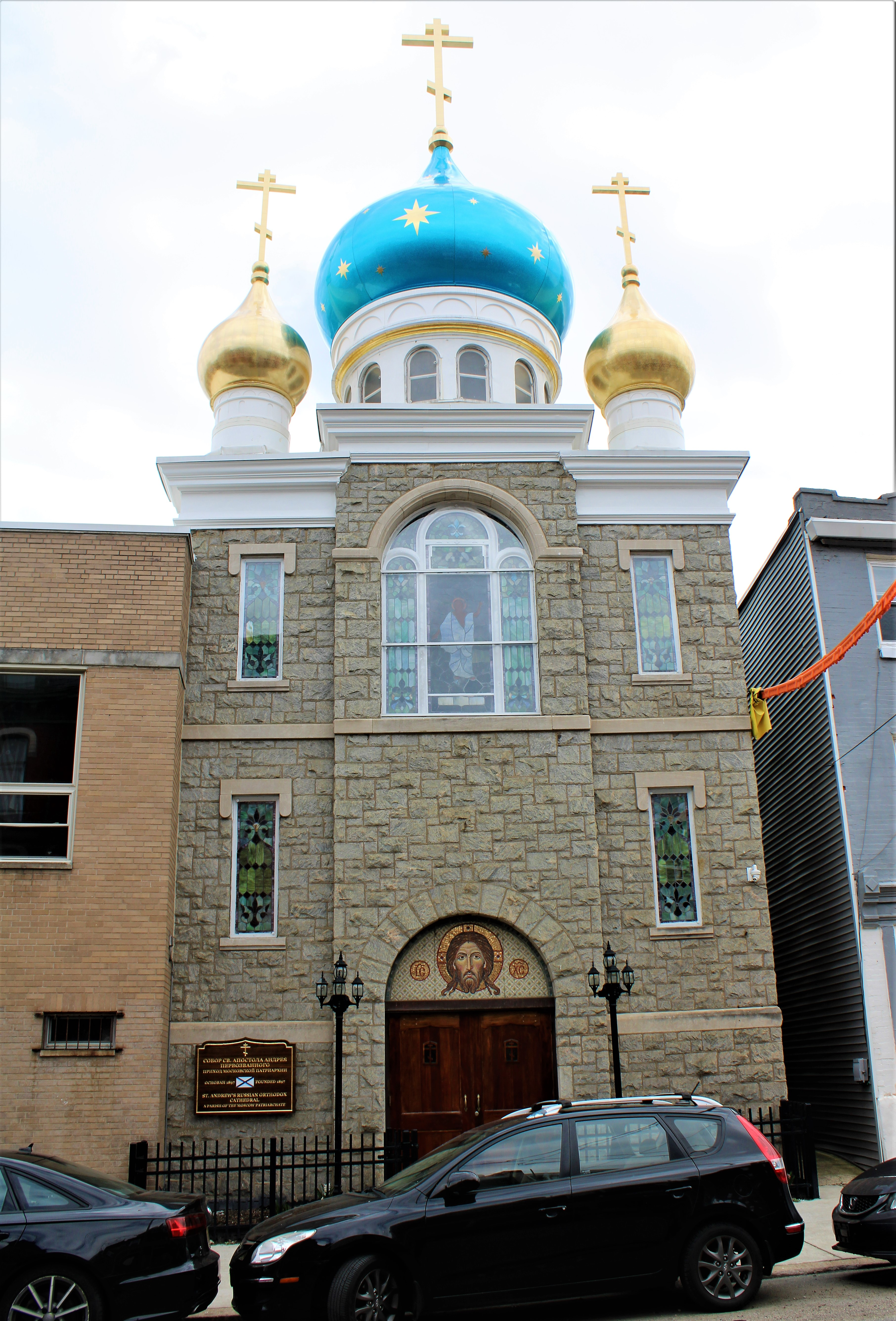
St. Andrew's Cathedral in 2022

St. Andrew's Cathedral, is a Russian Orthodox cathedral in Philadelphia. Established in 1897, it is the oldest Eastern Orthodox Christian Church in Philadelphia. The current rector is the Archpriest Mark Shinn. It is located at 5th Street & Fairmount Avenue.

The church was built by members of the Russian Navy who were awaiting completion of two Russian warships which were being built at Cramp's Shipyard for use in the Russo Japanese War, the Variag and Retvizan. The reason for the construction was that the sailors had no Russian Orthodox church to attend in Philadelphia and also wished to leave a place of worship for local Russian Orthodox people. The land and all materials and labor were donated by the sailors and construction was completed in 1897.

Adjacent to the church stands a small museum with photos, names and uniforms of the sailors who participated in the building of the church and also photos of their two ships which were both sunk by the Japanese during the war.

== Reliquary ==
This cathedral maintains a reliquary in which are kept the relics of 18 saints: the Holy Hierarch Alexis, Metropolitan of Moscow; Blessed Basil, Fool-for-Christ and Wonderworker of Moscow; the Holy Hierarch Ignatius (Brianchaninov); Blessed Matrona of Moscow; the Holy Great-Martyresses Marina and Barbara; the Holy Righteous Alexis (Mechev) of Moscow; the Holy Right-Believing Great Prince Alexander Nevsky; the Holy Hierarch Nicholas, Wonderworker of Myra in Lycia; the Holy Great-Martyr & Healer Panteleimon; the Holy Hierarch Theophanes the Recluse; the Holy Hierarch Tikhon of Zadonsk; and the Venerable Job of Pochaev, Herman of Alaska, Ambrose & Nectarius of Optina, Maximus the Greek, and Nilus of Stolobny Island.

The reliquary was brought from monasteries in Moscow and Odessa by clerics of St. Alexander Nevsky Cathedral: dean Archpriest Serge Lukianov and Archpriest Boris Slootsky, and presented to the clerics at St. Andrew's Cathedral, rector Archpriest Mark Shinn and Priest Alexander Tsygankov, who carried the relics into the cathedral, and presented them to "a multitude of the faithful, who had gathered to honor the memory of the Holy Apostle Andrew the First-Called on his feast day," according to Eastern American Diocese of the Russian Orthodox Church Outside Russia. Father Shinn celebrated this festal Divine Liturgy on December 13, 2017, which was co-officiated by Father Serge Lukianov; Archpriest Liubo Milosevich, rector of the Holy Trinity Church in Vineland, New Jersey; Boris Slootsky; Father Alexander Tsygankov; and Deacon Evgeny Iotov, a cleric of St. Andrew's Cathedral. Clergy from Antiochan, Romanian, and Serbian churches also participated. "Also taking part in the feast were representatives of the Russian Embassy in Washington, DC." Relics "from the diocesan cathedral itself" have also been placed inside the reliquary.
