= Ekuk, Alaska =

Unincorporated community in the state of Alaska, United States

Ekuk, Alaska Iquk
- Unincorporated community
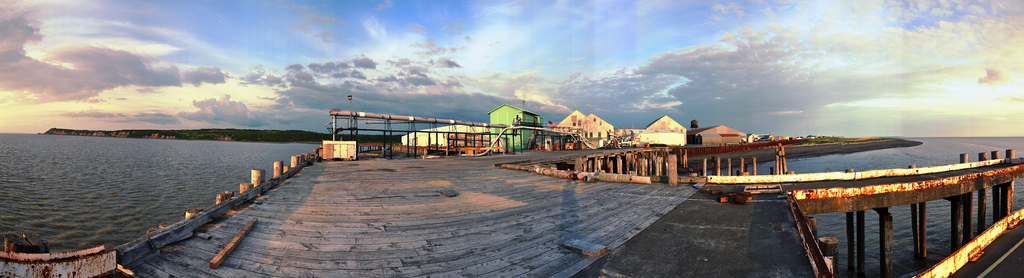
- Interactive map of Ekuk, Alaska
- Coordinates: 58°48′12″N 158°33′34″W
- Country: United States
- State: Alaska

Government
  - State senator: Lyman Hoffman (D)
  - State rep.: Bryce Edgmon (D)

Area
  - Total: 4.7 sq mi (12 km^{2})
  - Land: 4.7 sq mi (12 km^{2})
  - Water: 0.0 sq mi (0 km^{2})

Population (2010)
  - Total: 2
- Time zone: UTC-9 (AKST)
  - Summer (DST): UTC-8 (AKDT)
- Website: State of Alaska: Ekuk
- 72 housing units

Ekuk (Central Yupik: Iquk) is a small unincorporated community in the Dillingham Census Area in the U.S. state of Alaska. As of both the 2000 and 2010 U.S. Censuses, it had a population of 2. It is classified by the U.S. Census as an Alaska Native Village Statistical Area (ANVSA). Until 2002 it was the site of a large fish processing operation owned by Wards Cove Packing Company. Currently, it is inhabited mainly by seasonal fishing families who set gillnet in the nearby waters of the Nushagak Bay for mid-summer runs of sockeye salmon, early season runs of king salmon and late season runs of silver salmon.

Located 15 miles (24 km) southeast of Dillingham, Ekuk is accessible only by sea or by air.

Located in Southwest Alaska on the shores of Bristol Bay (and the Bering Sea), the nearby terrain is covered with tundra with few trees or shrubbery.

== Demographics ==
Historical population
Census	Pop.	Note	%±
1880	112		—
1890	65		−42.0%
1930	37		—
1960	40		—
1970	51		27.5%
1980	7		−86.3%
1990	3		−57.1%
2000	2		−33.3%
2010	2		0.0%
U.S. Decennial Census

At one point historically the Russians were there. Ekuk first appeared on the 1880 U.S. Census as an unincorporated village of 112 residents, all Yup'ik. It appeared as "Yekuk" on the 1890 census. It did not appear on the census again until 1930 (as Ekuk), and then not again until 1960. It was given the census designation of Alaska Native Village Statistical Area (ANVSA) in 1990.
