= Willi Brandt =

Willi Brandt may refer to:

- Willy Brandt (1913–1992), German statesman
- Willy Brandt (Oz), fictional character
- Willi Brandt (composer) (1869–1923), German composer

== See also ==
- Bill Brandt (1904–1983), British photojournalist
