= Ivan Lipaev =

Russian composer

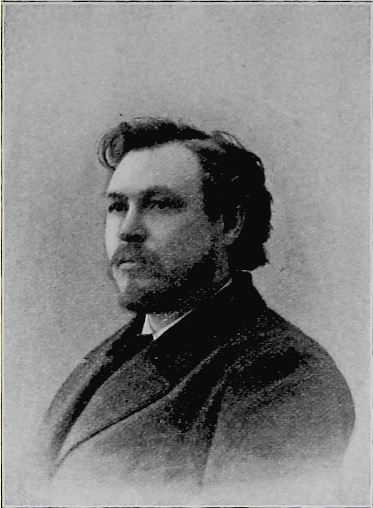
Ivan Vasilievich Lipaev c.1904

Ivan Vasilievich Lipaev (Russian: Иван Васильевич Липаев, 1865–1942) was a Russian music critic, composer, writer, social advocate, pedagogue, and trombonist active in both the Russian Empire and the Soviet Union. He played trombone in Russia's first brass quartet starting in around 1888, and in the Bolshoi Theatre orchestra from 1893 to 1912 and from 1924 to 1931. He was also dedicated to the modernization of music pedagogy in the Russian empire and advocated for better conditions for music students and orchestra members. He was made Honored Artist of the RSFSR in 1925.

== Biography ==
Lipaev was born on 16 May 1865 in the village of Spiridonovka, Bobrovskaya Volost, Samarsky Uyezd, Samara Governorate, Russian Empire. Starting in 1882 he studied trombone and composition at the School of Music and Drama of the Moscow Philharmonic Society and at the Moscow Conservatory.

In around 1888 he was a founding member of a new brass quartet at the Bolshoi Theatre, the first such quartet in Russia. The quartet became very popular and toured widely; its repertoire consisted mostly of Russian folk songs and operatic arias. Lipaev also joined the Bolshoi theatre orchestra from 1893 onwards. He also founded and led a mutual aid organization for orchestra musicians in 1903. After the turn of the century some members of the quartet moved on, and trumpeter Vassily Brandt joined; Lipaev remained in it until around 1912.

His writing career began in around 1885; thereafter he would publish and work prodigiously in a number of publications as editor, music critic, and correspondent. Among the publications he wrote for were Novosti dnya (Новости дня, 1885–1901), Teatr i zhizn' (Театр и жизнь, 1888–1890), Russkiy listok (Русский листок, 1893–1904), Teatr, izvestiya (Театр, известия, 1893–1900), Teatral (Театрал, 1895–1897), Teatr i iskusstvo (Театр и искусство, 1897–1898), Muzyka i zhizn' (Музыка и жизнь, 1908–1912), Saratovskiy listok (Саратовский листок, 1913–1917), and Rabis (Рабис, 1927–1930). At times he published under the pseudonyms Ivel, Samarov, or Volgarev. In 1896 he also became correspondent for Russkaya muzykal'naya gazeta (Russian Musical Gazette, Russian: Русская музыкальная газета), a position he held until 1917. He also founded two short-lived publications which he edited himself. The first, founded in 1906, was called Muzykalny truzhenik (Musical Worker, Музыкальный труженик). After that journal ceased publication in 1910 he founded a new one called Orkestr (Оркестр), which described and analyzed the lives of ordinary orchestral musicians; it lasted until 1912. He was also interested in Jewish music, was a friend of pioneering ethnomusicologist Joel Engel, and published what may have been the first scholarly examination of Klezmer music in a 1904 issue of Russkaya muzykal'naya gazeta.

In 1912 he followed Vassily Brandt to Saratov, leaving the Bolshoi and the quartet, and soon started teaching trombone and music history at the Saratov Conservatory. During his early years there he published a number of biographies of composers and musicians including Alexander Scriabin, Alexander Taneyev, and Sergei Rachmaninoff. He became a professor at the Saratov Conservatory in 1917. He left the conservatory in 1921. From 1923 to 1934 he taught Music History at various music colleges in Moscow. From 1924 onwards he also returned to playing in the Bolshoi Theatre orchestra.

Lipaev died in Tashkent on 25 September 1942. His papers were donated to the Russian State Archive of Literature and Art and other institutions.

== Selected works ==
- Essays on the way of life of orchestral musicians (Очерки быта оркестровыхъ музыкантовъ, 1891)
- Arthur Nikish, orchestra director (Артур Никиш, дирижёр оркестра, 1903)
- Wagneriana: A satellite of operas and musical dramas (Вагнериана. Спутник опер и музыкальных драм, 1904)
- Orchestral musicians (Оркестровые музыканты, 1904)
- Finnish Music: an essay (Финская музыка: очерк, 1906)
- A. N. Skriabin (А. Н. Скрябин, 1913)
- S.V. Rakhmaninov (С. В. Рахманинов, 1913)
- S. I. Tanev: life, activity, music, works, list of compositions (С.И. Танѣев: жизнь, деятельность, музык, произведения, список сочинений, 1915)
- A History of music (Исторія музыки: курс лекцій, читанных в Саратовской Императорской Алексѣевской консерваторіи, 1915)
- History of the Bolshoi theatre orchestra (Былое оркестра Большого театра, 1924)
- Twenty Tuba Exercises (Двадцать упражнений для тубы, 1927)
