= Apolinary Szeluto =

Polish pianist and composer (1884–1966)

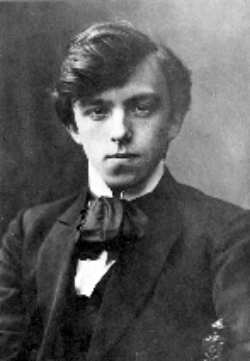
- Born: 23 July 1884; St. Petersburg, Russian Empire
- Died: 22 August 1966 (aged 82); Chodzież, Poland
- Known for: Music
- Movement: Young Poland

Apolinary Szeluto (23 July 1884 – 22 August 1966) was a Polish pianist and composer of the Young Poland style.

== Life and career ==
Apolinary Szeluto was born in St. Petersburg, and began the study of piano at age nine. He studied music at the Saratov Conservatory with Stanislav Echsner, composition at the Warsaw Conservatory from 1902 to 1905 with Roman Statkowski and Zygmunt Noskowski, and piano performance in Berlin from 1905 to 1908 with Leopold Godowsky. He also completed studies in law at the University of Dorpat. After completing his education, he worked as a concert pianist, actively performing from 1909 until 1931.

In 1909 Szeluto took a position as a professor at the Berlin Conservatory, and later relocated to work as a judge near Astrachan, Russia. He took part in the Russian Revolution, and was named Chairman of the local Revolutionary Committee. Afterward he worked for a time in the Ministry of Justice in Poland. His compositions from this period reflected his dedication to the ideal of Socialist realism.

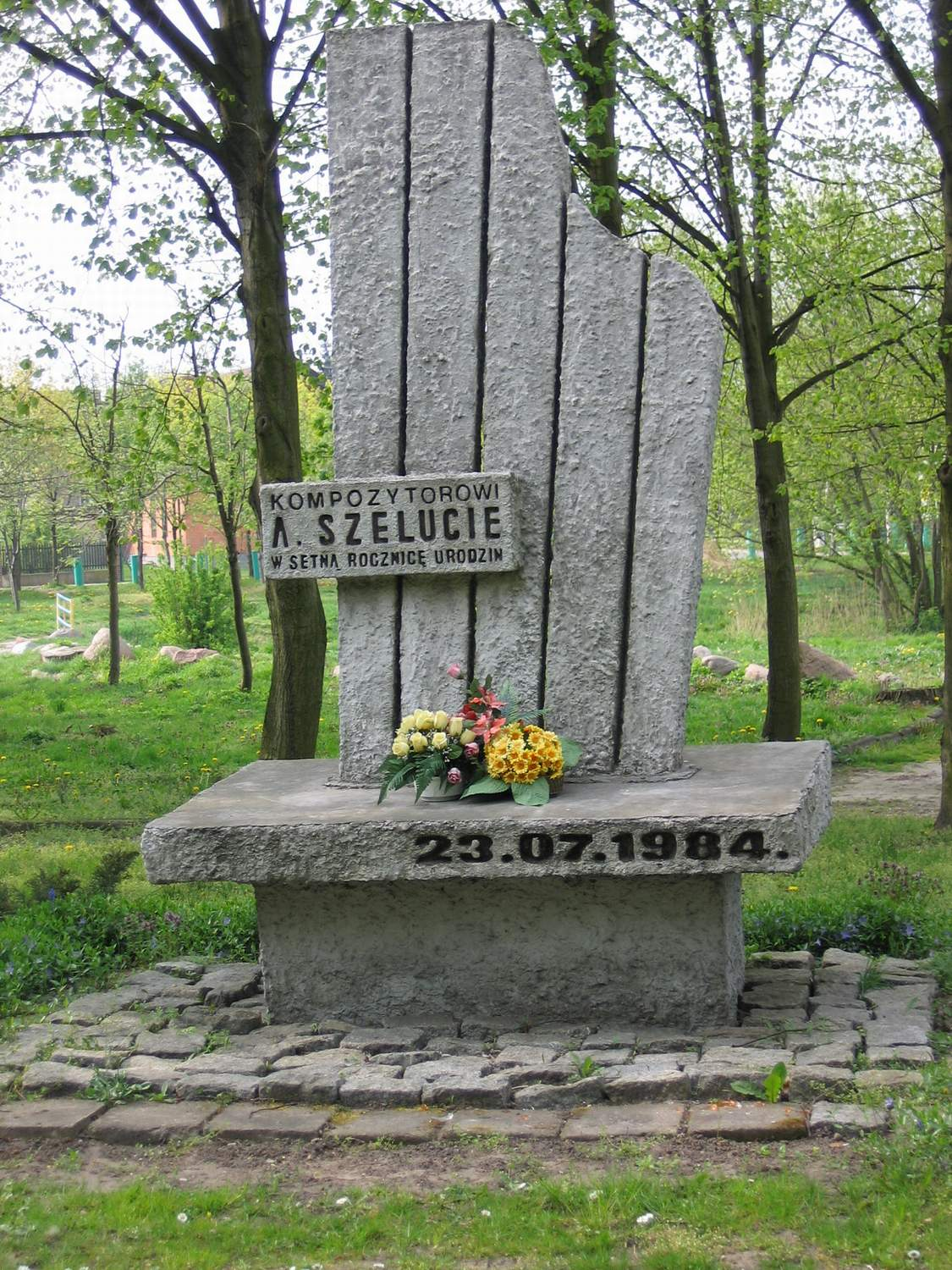
Monument to Szeluto in Słupca.

In 1934 he settled in Słupca in Greater Poland, where he worked as a notary and later as a judge. When the Nazis occupied Poland, he worked as a baker and street trader, while continuing to compose. In his later years, he suffered from a progressive mental illness. He died in a nursing home in Chodzież, and was buried at the Słupca Cemetery. His papers are housed in the National Library in Warsaw. A music school in Słupca bears his name.

== Works ==
Szeluto was a prolific composer, producing symphonies, orchestral suites, piano, violin and cello concertos, masses, choral music and songs, and instrumental and various chamber works. Selected compositions include:

- Cyrano de Bergerac, symphonic poem, 1933
- Macbeth, symphonic poem, 1933
- Piano Concerto No. 1, 1933–37
- Piano Concerto No. 2, 1936–37
- Piano Concerto No. 3, 1940
- Violin Concerto, 1942
- Cello Concerto, 1942
- Piano Concerto No. 4, 1944
- Piano Concerto No. 5, 1948
- String Quartet, 1931
- String Quartet "Tatra Mountains"
- Trio, for violin, cello and piano, 1940
- Violin Sonatas
- Cello Sonatas
