= Universal Saratov =

- City: Saratov, Russia
- Founded: 1953; 72 years ago
- Home arena: Dynamo Stadium

Universal Saratov (Russian: Универсал Саратов) is a bandy club in Saratov, Russia. The club was founded in 1953 and is playing in the Russian Bandy Supreme League, the second tier of Russian bandy. The home games are played at Stadium Dynamo. The building of an indoor arena is being considered. The club colours are black and white.

Team picture:
