= Saratov Drama Theater =

Russian theater

- Саратовский академический театр драмы имени И. А. Слонова
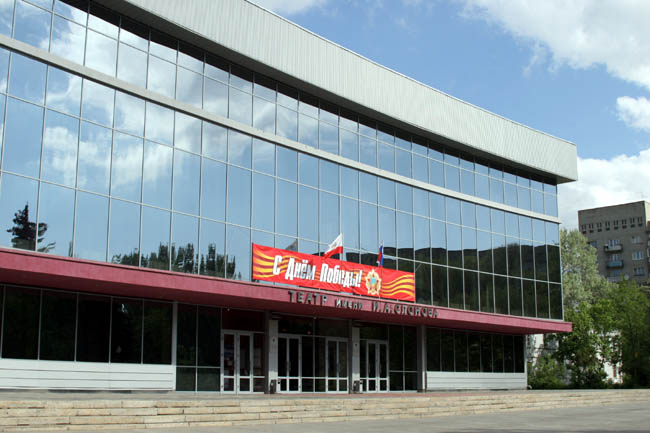
- Interactive map of Saratov Drama Theater
- Address: Saratov; Russia
- Coordinates: 51°32′02″N 46°00′06″E

Construction
- Opened: 1859

Website
- www.saratovdrama.com

Saratov Drama Theater (Russian: Саратовский академический театр драмы имени И. А. Слонова) is located in the city of Saratov, Russia. It is one of the oldest theaters in Russia.

Saratov Drama Theater was founded in 1859. Before its establishment, acting troupes from Moscow and St. Petersburg periodically visited Saratov, but only played private functions for the city's wealthier inhabitants.

In 1859, Franz Schechtel (ru: Франц Осипович Шехтель), a wealthy merchant of German descent, opened his private home theater to the general public. In the first decades of its existente, the theater burned down and was rebuilt several times.

The city did not originally possess its own troupe, but actors from other cities soon began to visit the new theater. Many famous 19th-century actors, including Piotr Medvedev (ru: Пётр Михайлович Медведев), Nicolay Sobolschikov-Samarin (ru: Собольщиков-Самарин, Николай Иванович), Aleksandr Lensky (ru: Александр Павлович Ленский), Maria Savina (ru: Савина, Мария Гавриловна), Vladimir Davydov (ru: Владимир Николаевич Давыдов), Pelageya Strepetova (ru: Стрепетова, Полина Антипьевна), and Vasily Kachalov (ru: Качалов, Василий Иванович), played in Saratov.

In 1915 a large group of professional actors moved from Kyiv to Saratov. Among them was Ivan Slonov, one of the most famous actors in the Russian Empire at the time. He would go on to perform at Saratov Dramatic Theater for 30 years, until his death in 1945.

After the 1917 Revolution, the theater changed its name to Karl Marx Drama Theater. In 1968, a new theater building was erected.

In 1991, with the fall of the Soviet Union, it changed its name to Ivan Slonov Dramatic Theater.

Nowadays, it is one of the oldest and most famous theaters in Russia. Its repertoire consists of both classical plays and contemporary authors.

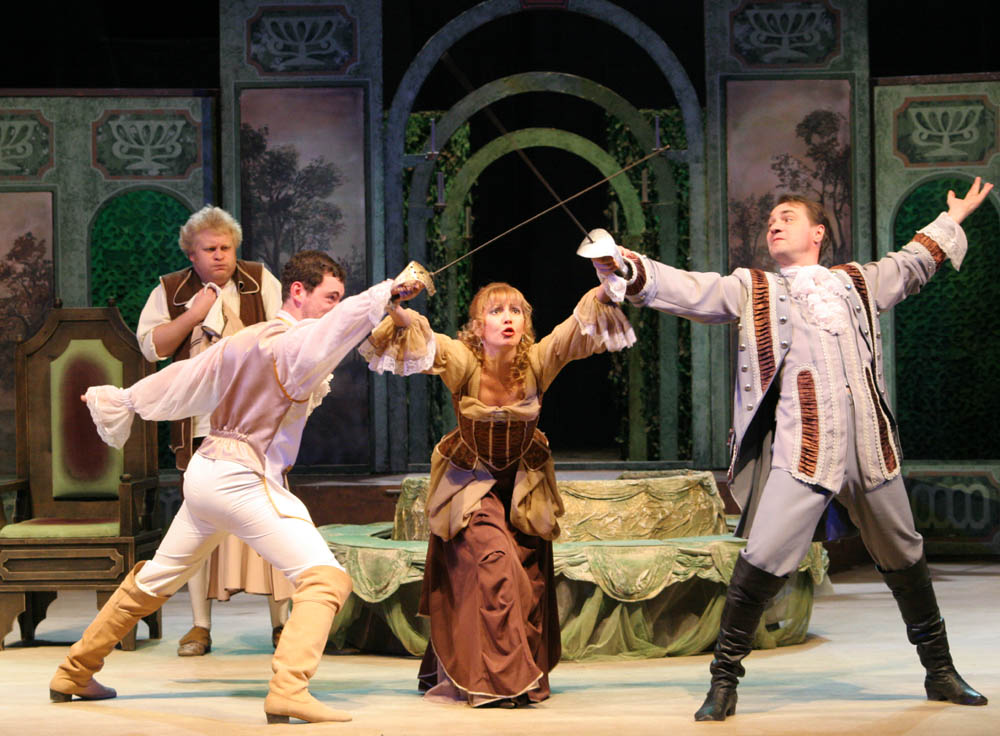
The Night bugs by Oliver Goldsmith, 2006

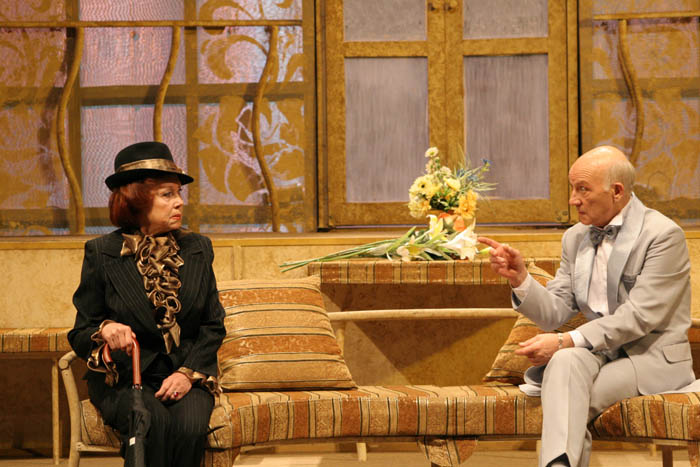
The Quartet by Ronald Harwood, 2006

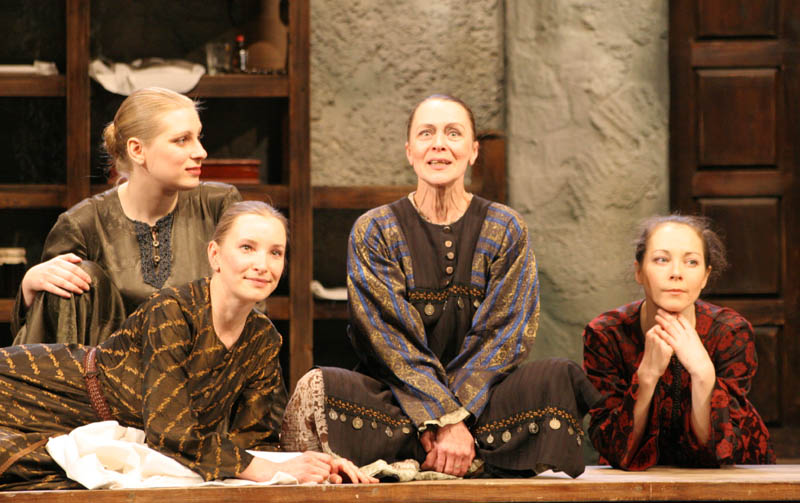
The House of Bernarda Alba by Federico García Lorca, 2006

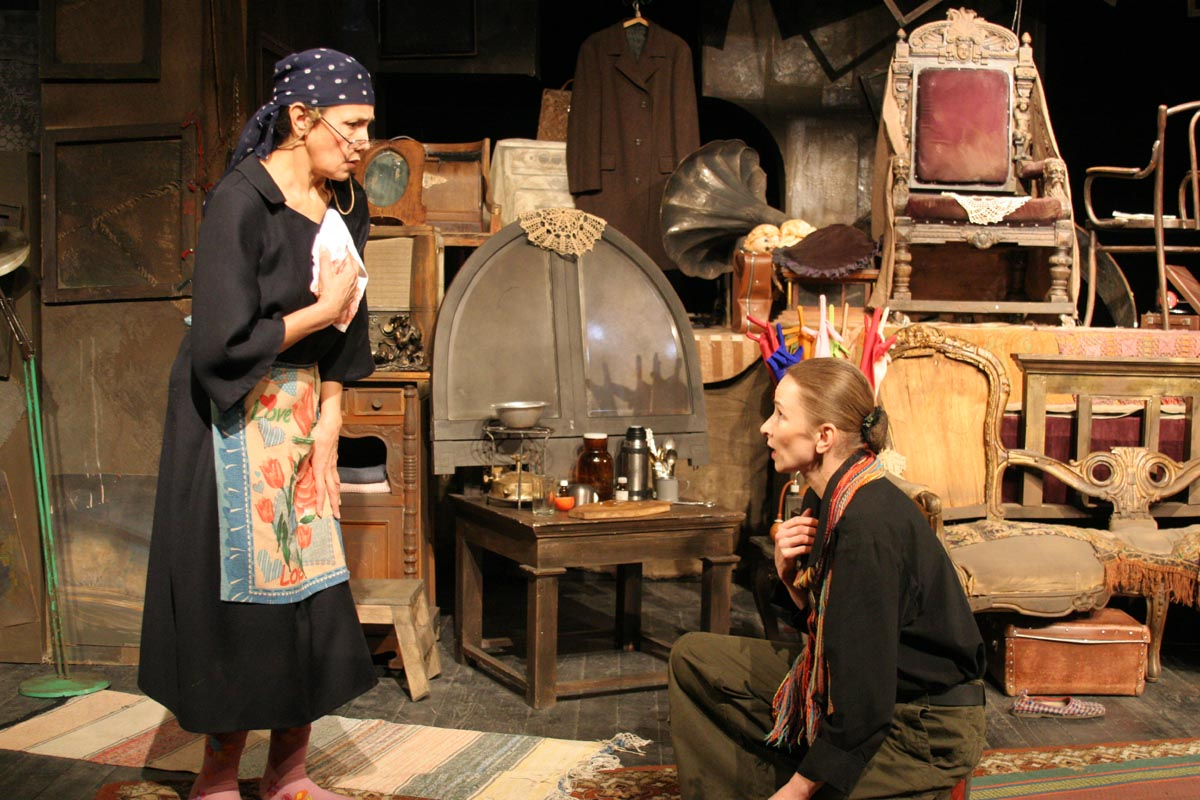
The Trash by Yosef Bar-Yosef (Cooper, his daughter and the art of photography), 2008

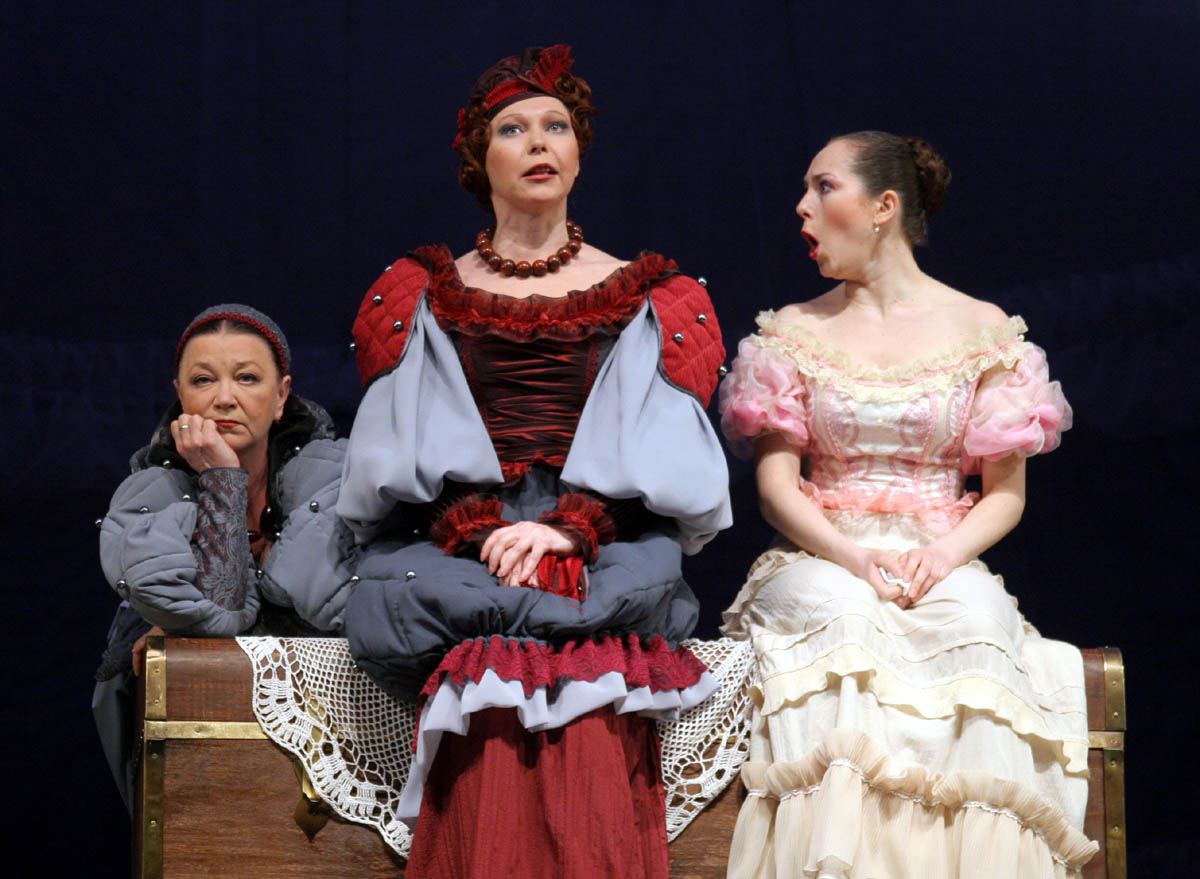
The Mariage by Nikolai Gogol, 2010

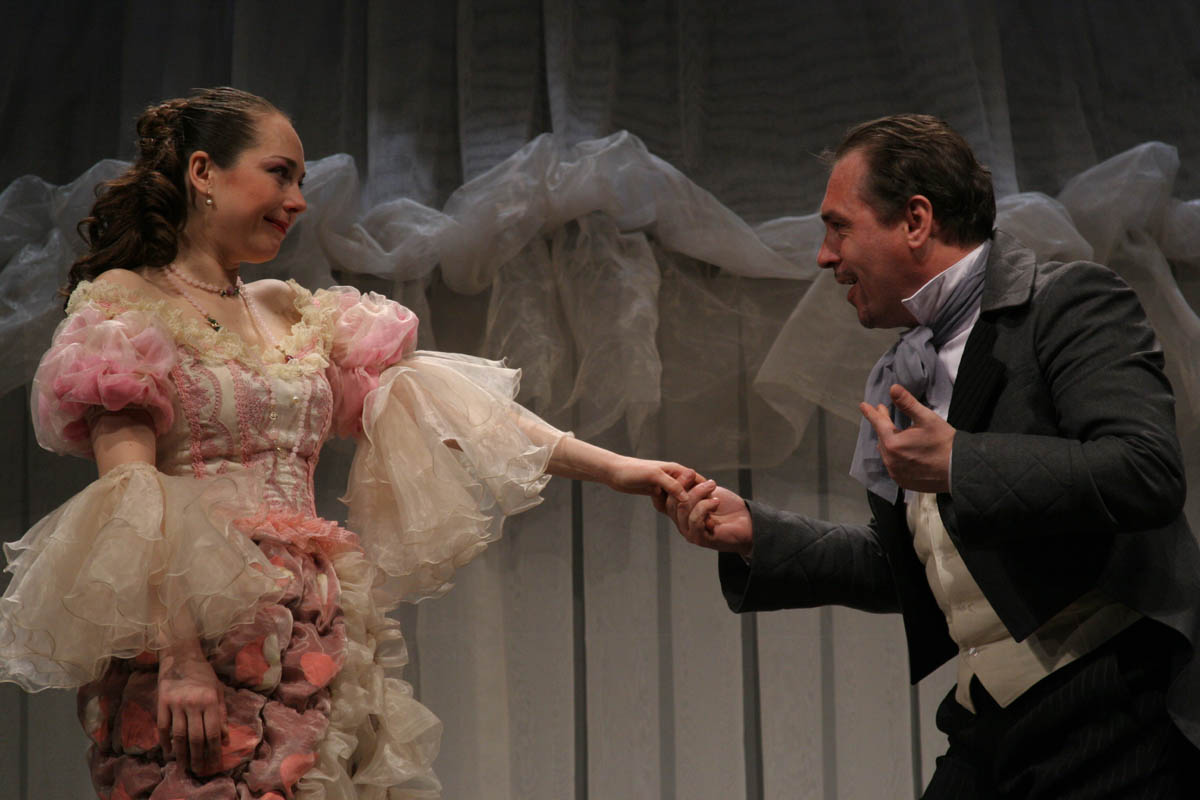
The Mariage by Nikolai Gogol. Agafya (actress Tatiana Rodionova), Podkolyosin (actor Igor Bagoley), 2010

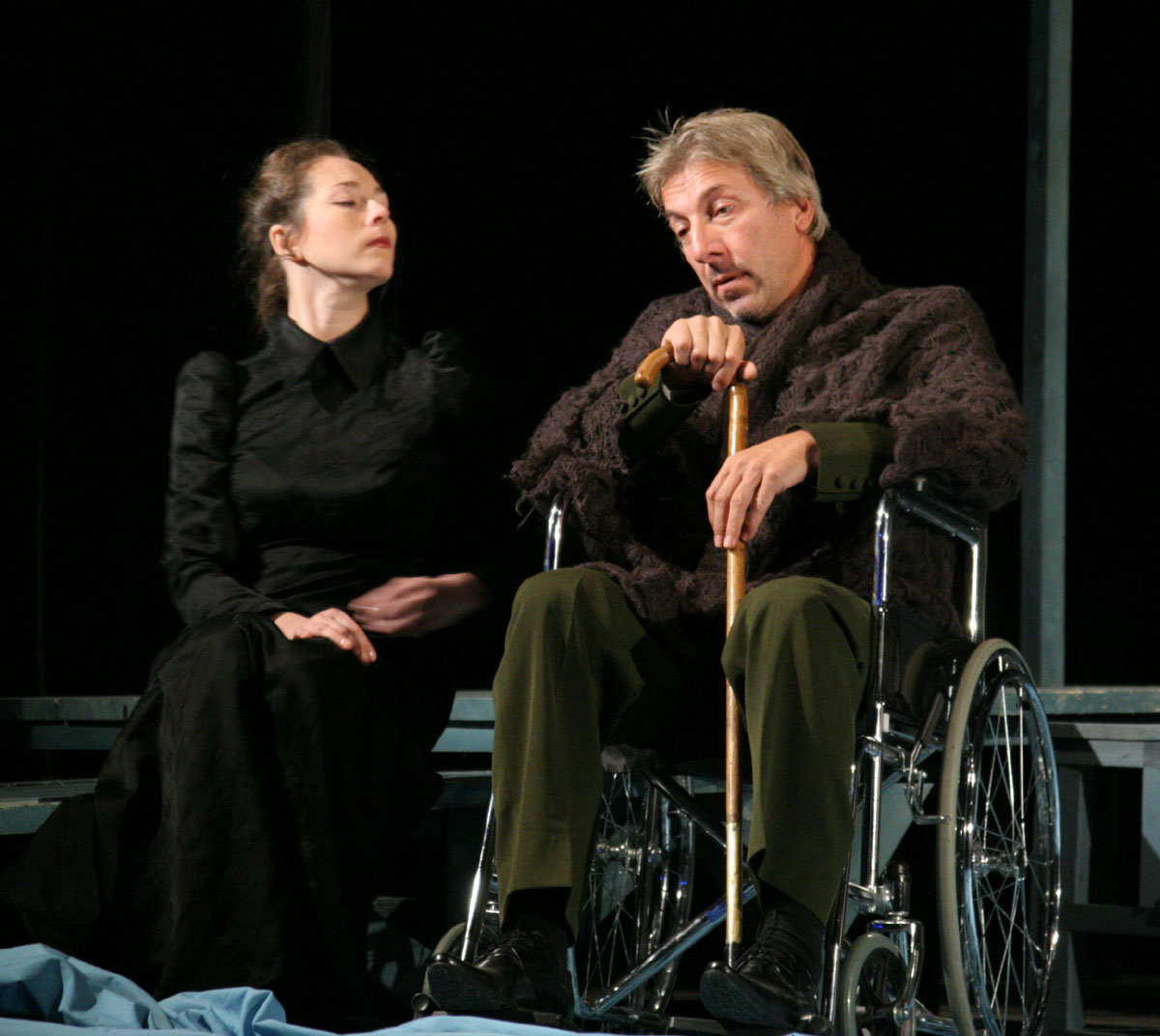
The Seagull by Anton Chekhov. Masha (actress Tatiana Rodionova, Sorin (actor Youriy Koudinov), 2010

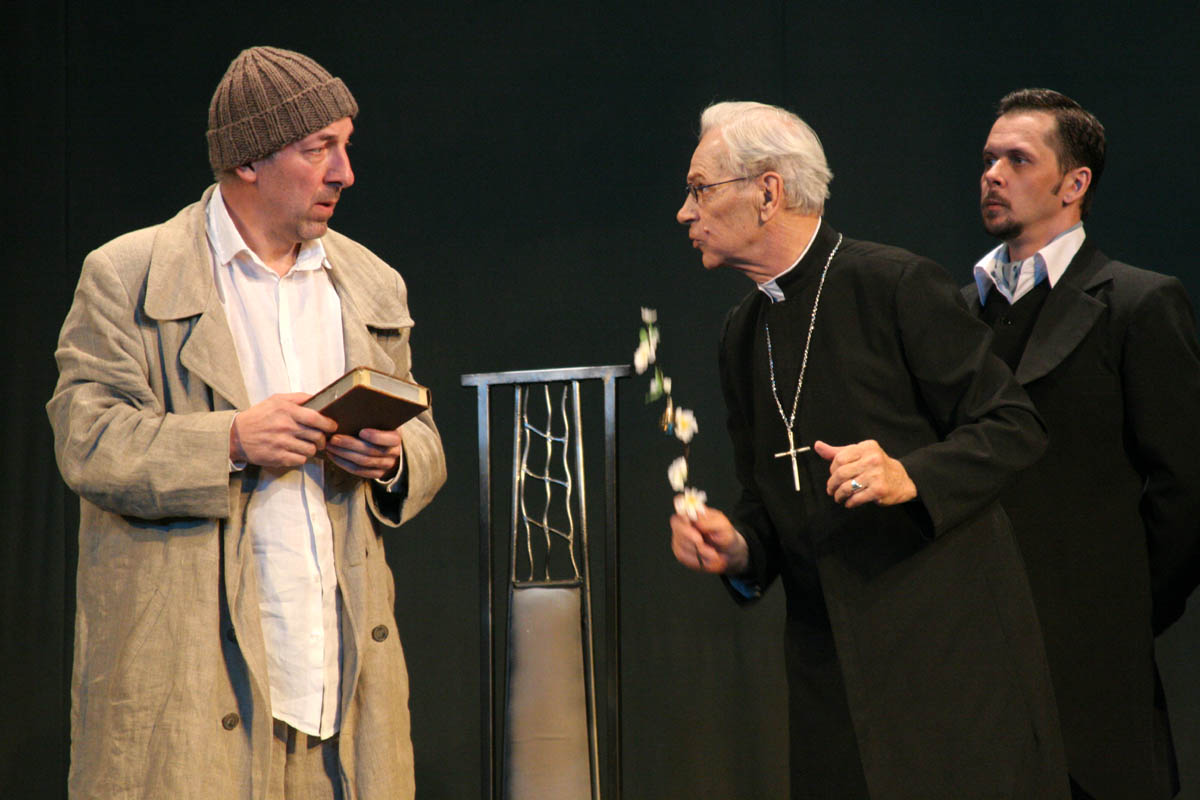
Le Miracle de saint Antoine by Maurice Maeterlinck. Saint Antoine (actor Youriy Koudinov), Abbot (Vladimir Aoukchtylaknis), M. Gustave (Andrey Sedov), 2011
