= Vassily Brandt =

Russian composer (1869–1923)

- Born: Karl Wilhelm Brandt; 1869; Coburg, Saxe-Coburg and Gotha
- Died: 2 February 1923 (aged 53–54) Saratov, Saratov Oblast, Russia
- Genres: Classical
- Occupations: Musician, composer, conductor, teacher
- Instruments: Cornet, trumpet, piano
- Years active: 1887–1923

Karl Wilhelm (Vasily Georgievich) Brandt (Willy Brandt) (1869 – 2 February 1923) was a German-Russian trumpeter, pedagogue, and composer. He is the founder of the Russian trumpet school.

== Life ==
Karl Wilhelm Brandt was born and educated in Coburg, Saxe-Coburg and Gotha, now part of Germany. Between 1887 and 1890, he worked alternately in the spa orchestra in Bad Oeynhausen and in Helsinki. He was active in the Helsinki Philharmonic Society, now the Helsinki Philharmonic Orchestra, under Robert Kajanus. In 1890, he changed his name to Vassily Georgyevich and moved to Moscow, Russia.

The opening of the Saratov Conservatory in September 1912 drew Vassily Brandt to Saratov for the remainder of his life. He spoke Russian quite poorly, often relying on demonstration for musical instruction. He died on 2 February 1923, purportedly as the result of a vaccination.

== Career ==
Vassily Brandt became principal trumpet of the Bolshoi Theatre in 1890 and became first cornet in 1903. He succeeded Theodor Richter (1826–1901) as the second ever trumpet professor of the Moscow Conservatory in 1900, and also taught band orchestration there. In Moscow, he was part of the Russian Musical Society and toured as part of a brass quartet with members of the Bolshoi Theatre. He conducted for the Alexandrovsky Military College military band.

Brandt joined the faculty of the newly established Saratov Conservatory in 1912 as the first professor of trumpet. His fellow brass quartet member Ivan Lipaev made a similar move. There, he managed and conducted the conservatory orchestra in addition to playing as the principal trumpet. He taught using the Arban method and his own compositions.

== Influence ==
Following the death of Brandt, Konstantin Listov composed Funeral Fanfare for his departed teacher. Brandt's 34 Orchestral Etudes (34 Studies for Trumpet) is an important study material for modern trumpet players. His Last Etudes (The Last Studies) serve a similar purpose. His two Concert Pieces (Konzertstücke Opp. 11–12) for trumpet and piano are also widely performed today. Country Pictures is a notable quartet for trumpets or horns from him. Several of his compositions and etude books are published by International Music Company.

Among his students are Pyotr Lyamin (1884–1968) who succeeded Brandt as a professor at the Saratov Conservatory; Pavel Klochkov (1884–1966) who was an early Russian recording artist; Vladimir Drucker (1898–1974) who was a principal trumpet with the Los Angeles Philharmonic; and Mikhail Tabakov (1877–1956) who became professor at the Moscow Conservatory.

34 Studies for Trumpet
No.	Tempo Marking	Written Keys	Meter	Subdivision
1	Allegro alla marcia = 116	C major	2/4	Sixteenth note
2	Marziale = 124	B♭ major	common time	Sixteenth note
3	Allegretto = 108	C major	3/4	Sixteenth note
4	Allegro ma non troppo = 100	C major	common time	Sixteenth note
5	Allegro = 126	F major	3/4	Sixteenth note
6	Tempo di Valse . = 60	F major	3/4	Eighth note
7	Moderato = 116	C minor	5/4	Sixteenth note
8	Allegro moderato = 120	E♭ major	common time	Sixteenth note
9	= 116	A minor	7/4	Sixteenth note
10	Tempo di Valse . = 72	F major	3/4	Eighth note
11	Maestoso = 84	C major	3/4	Thirty-second note
12	A la Polacca = 72	G major	3/4	Thirty-second note
13	Marziale = 120	E minor	common time	Sixteenth note
14	Maestoso = 108	C major	common time	Thirty-second note and Eighth note triplet
15	Scherzando = 76	A major	3/8	Sixteenth note
16	Allegro grazioso = 78	C minor	3/8	Sixteenth note
17	Scherzando . = 126	F major	6/8	Eighth note
18	Allegro = 116	F major	6/8	Eighth note
19	Allegro à la chasse . = 112	E major	6/8	Sixteenth note
20	Allegro . = 132	D minor	6/8	Sixteenth note
21	Allegro grazioso . = 112	F major	6/8	Sixteenth note
22	Allegro spiritoso . = 120	F major and G minor	12/8	Sixteenth note
23	Animato alla Polacca . = 96	G major	9/8	Sixteenth note
24	Moderato . = 90	F major	6/8	Sixteenth note
25	Allegretto . = 80	G major and C major	6/8	Sixteenth note
26	Presto = 136	E minor and F major	3/4	Sixteenth note
27	Vivo vivace (Presto) = 100	A minor	2/4	Sixteenth note and Eighth note triplet alternation
28	= 104	F major	2/4	Sixteenth note triplet
29	Adagio Cantabile = 66	C major and A♭ major	common time	Quarter note and Eighth note triplet
30	Scherzando . = 72	F major	3/8	Sixteenth note, Thirty-second note, and Eighth note quadruplet
31	Scherzo . = 90	G minor	3/8	Sixteenth note
32	Allegro con moto = 96	F major and D♭ major	common time	Sixteenth note
33	Moderato = 150	G minor	12/8	Sixteenth note
34	= 144 and Animato = 160	F major	6/8	Thirty-second note
