= Stanislav Echsner =

Polish-Russian musician and pianist

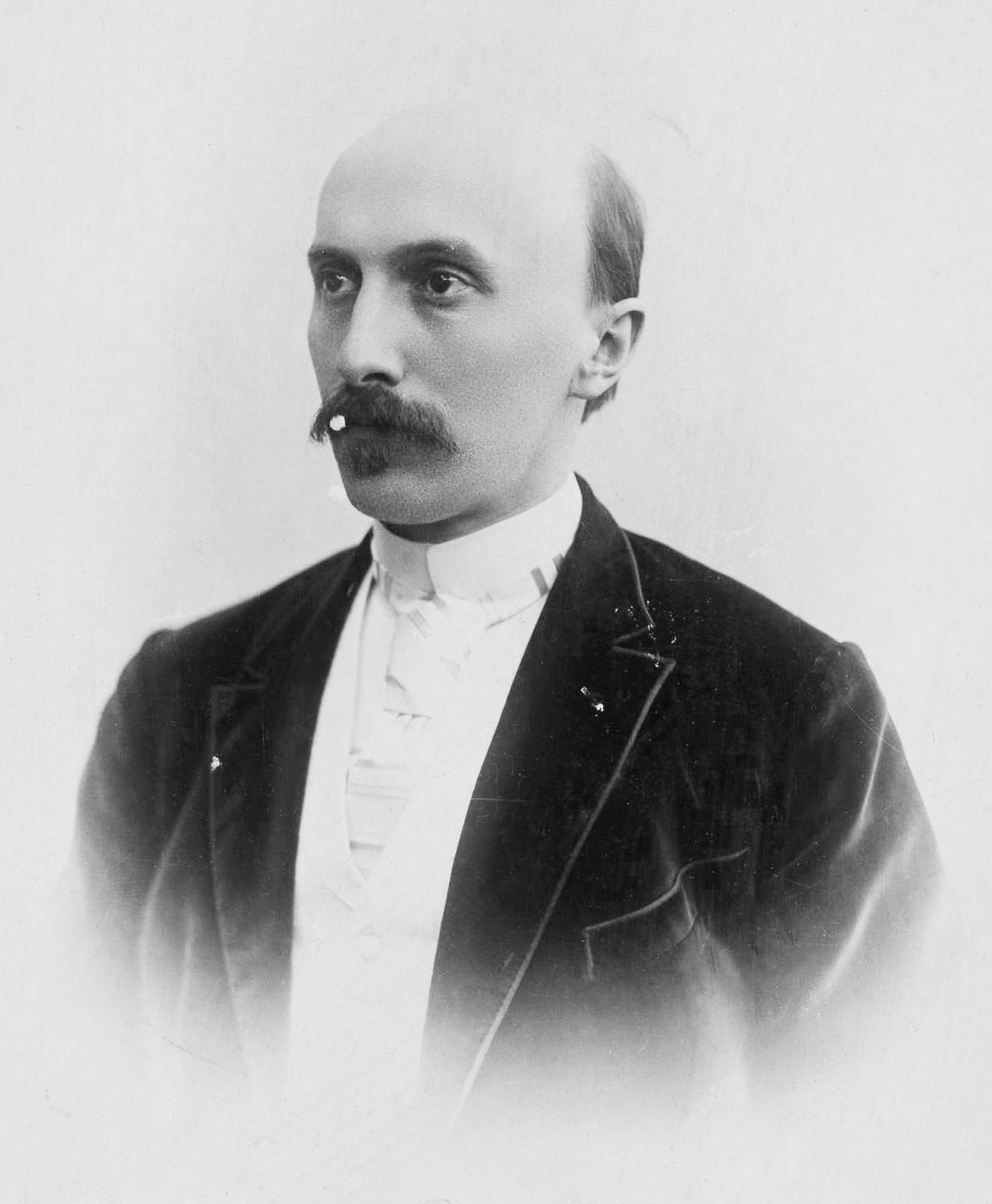
Stanisław Eksner

Stanislav Kasparovich Echsner, Polish: Stanisław Eksner (Exner), Russian: Станисла́в Каспа́рович Экснер Stanislav Kasparovič Eksner (May 7 ?/May 19, 1859, Radoszyce, Congress Poland – November 28, 1934, Warsaw) was a Polish-Russian musician, pianist, and activist music educator. He was the founder of the Saratov Music School (now Saratov Regional College of Art) - 1895, and the Saratov Conservatory - 1912.

== Biography ==
From 1875 to 1878, Echsner studied at the Leipzig Conservatory as a pianist. He then moved to St. Petersburg and graduated from the St. Petersburg Conservatory in 1883 with first prize. From 1883 to 1921 he lived and worked in Saratov, first as head of music classes of the Imperial Russian Musical Society, and then from 1912 to 1914 as the first director of the Saratov Conservatory. The growth of music education in Saratov was largely a result of his work. In addition to the educational and organizational work he put into concerts, he continued to perform as a pianist and later as a conductor. In 1909 he celebrated 25 years of artistic activity in the city. He was awarded the title of Honorary Citizen of Saratov in 1914.

In 1921 Echsner left Russia. He died in Warsaw in 1934 after a long illness, and was buried at the Powazki Cemetery.

Notable students include Apolinary Szeluto.
