= Yuri Gagarin State Technical University of Saratov =

- Саратовский государственный технический университет
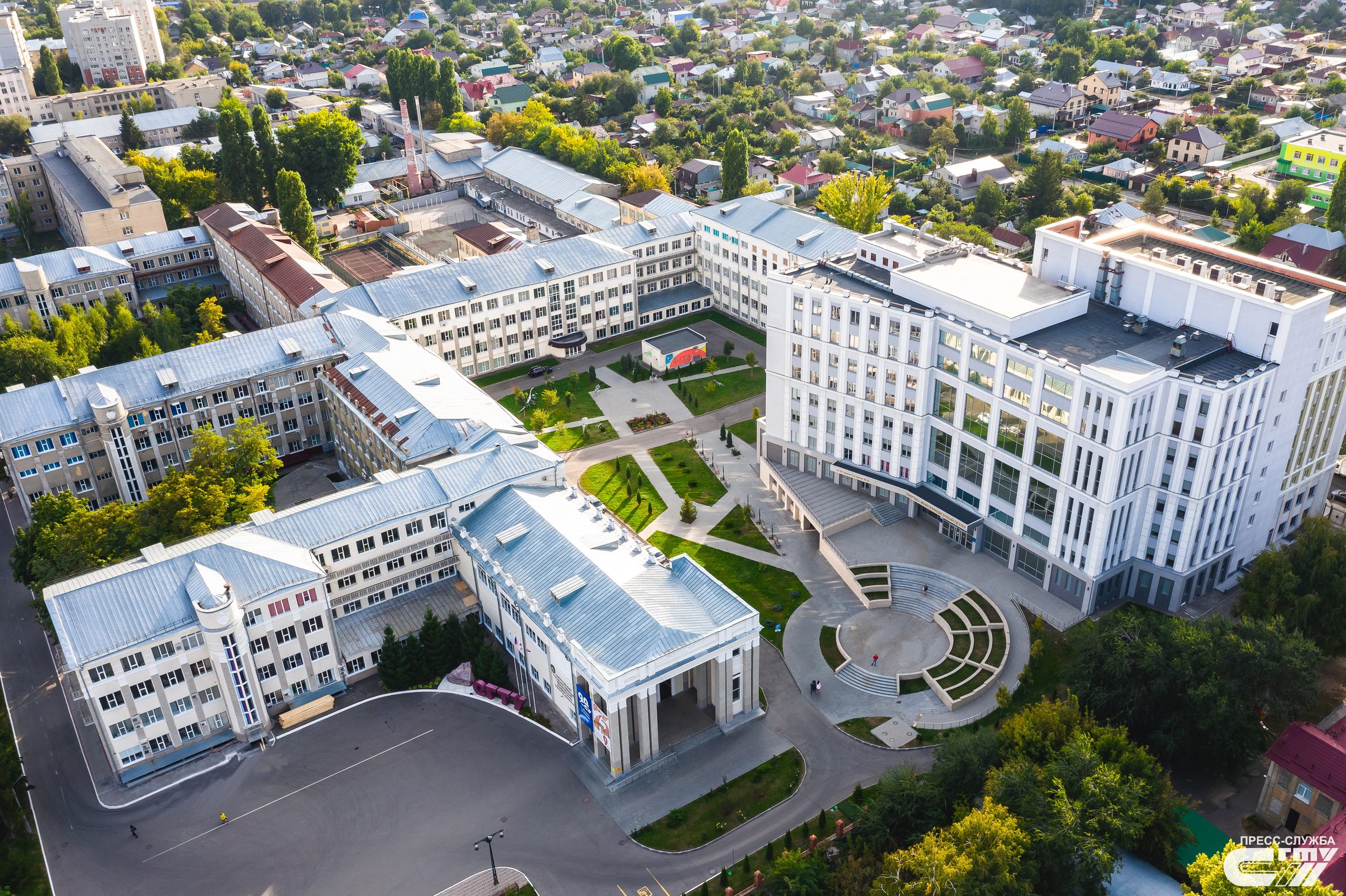
- Type: Public
- Established: October 6, 1930
- Rector: Sergei Naumov
- Undergraduates: 19694
- Location: Polytechnicheskaya st, 77, Saratov, Saratov Oblast, Russia; 51°31′44″N 45°58′40″E
- Website: www.sstu.ru

University rankings

Regional – Overall
- QS Emerging Europe and Central Asia: 251-300 (2022)

Yuri Gagarin State Technical University of Saratov (SSTU, Russian: Саратовский государственный технический университет имени Гагарина Ю.А.) was founded in 1930 as Saratov Automobile and Road Institute. It was renamed in 2011 to honour astronaut Yuri Gagarin. SSTU offers Bachelor, Master, and PhD studies in more than 115 fields.

== History ==
1930- Foundation of the Saratov Automobile and Road Institute.

1960- Saratov Polytechnic Institute.

1992 Saratov State Technical University.

2011 - Yuri Gagarin State Technical University of Saratov.

== Institutes ==
- Institute of Electronic Engineering and Instrumentation
- Institute of Mechanical Engineering and Materials Science
- Institute of Physics and Technology
- Institute of Applied Information Technologies and Communication
- Institute of Power Engineering & Transport Systems
- Institute of Urban Planning, Architecture & Civil Engineering
- Institute of Social and Industrial Management
- Social and Economic Institute
- Engels Institute of Technology (branch)
- Institute of Continuing and Pre-University Education

== Secondary vocational education ==
- Professional Training College
- Saratov College of Machine Building & Power Engineering
- Petrovsk College of Yuri Gagarin State Technical University of Saratov (Branch in the Petrovsk town)

== Russian language school ==
In SSTU foreign applicants are taught the Russian language for admission to the bachelor's and master's degree programs. There are three study programs:

Saratov Russian language school

- Russian language (preparatory course) - 9 months
- Russian summer language school- 1 month
- Russian on-line language school - 1 month
