= Saratov Regional College of Art =

Coordinates: 51.5288°N 46.0346°E

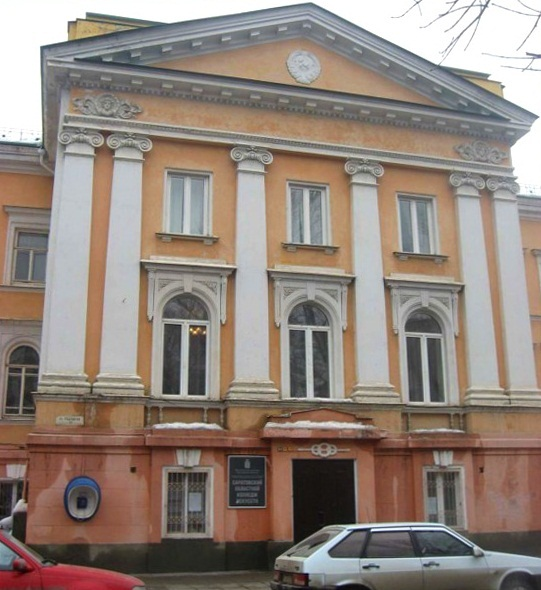
СОКИ 13412341234124

Saratov Regional College of Arts is a secondary school for training in the arts in the city of Saratov, Russia. It was officially opened on December 26, 2014.

The Saratov Regional College of Arts was founded by Stanislav Echsner as a music school in 1895. It is one of the oldest and most authoritative educational institutions of the Volga Region, but has never previously had a campus. The construction project provides accommodations for 156 students and living space for professors, tutors and classes, as well as medical facilities. Valery Radayev, the governor of Saratov region, attended the opening ceremony and noted that the accomplishment resulted from an important cooperation between business and government authorities.

== See also ==
- List of institutions of higher learning in Russia
