= Denis Bakurskiy =

Russian footballer

Personal information
- Full name: Denis Aleksandrovich Bakurskiy
- Date of birth: 19 March 1981 (age 45)
- Place of birth: Saratov, Russian SFSR
- Height: 1.80 m (5 ft 11 in)
- Positions: Defender; midfielder; forward

Senior career*
Years	Team	Apps	(Gls)
1999	FC Balakovo	1	(0)
2000	FC Spartak-2 Moscow	19	(1)
2001	FC Zhemchuzhina Sochi	27	(1)
2003–2005	FC Iskra Engels	73	(1)
2005	FC Sokol Saratov	15	(0)
2006	FC Sokol Saratov (amateur)		
2007	FC Gubkin	23	(0)
2008–2009	FC Sokol-Saratov	24	(0)
2009	FC Taganrog	15	(0)
- * Club domestic league appearances and goals

Denis Aleksandrovich Bakurskiy (Russian: Денис Александрович Бакурский; born 19 March 1981) is a former Russian professional football player.

== Club career ==
He played in the Russian Football National League for FC Sokol Saratov in 2005.
