= Nisson Shkarovsky =

Nisson Adolfovich Shkarovsky (1904, Odessa - 1964, Moscow), was an influential conductor and teacher in the Saratov Conservatory.

== Biography ==
Shkarovsky was born in Odessa in 1904, in a Jewish family that originated in Bila Tserkva. He studied in the Odessa Conservatory (now the Odessa National A. V. Nezhdanova Academy of Music), playing the violin. His debut was in Odessa in 1925, as a soloist in Faust (opera) by Charles Gounod.

From 1934 until his death, he served as a conductor, directing several productions:

- "Snow Maiden" by Rimsky-Korsakov in 1935
- "The Quiet Don" by I.I. Dzerzhinskogo in 1935
- "Othello" by Verdi in 1938
- "Dubrovsky" by E.F. Napravnika in 1945
- "Princess Mary" by V.A. Dehtereva in 1946
- "Bogdan Khmelnitsky" by K.F. Dankevicha in 1954
- "Tanya" by G.G. Kreytnera in 1956
- "The Golden Cockerel by Rimsky-Korsakov in 1956
- Three Fat Men" in 1957

In 1938 he received the prestigious Honored Artist of the Kazakh SSR award. In 1941 he joined the Communist Party. Later in 1949 he taught at the Saratov Conservatory. He was instrumental in building up their opera department. In 1964, Shkarovsky died in Moscow.
