= Ukek =

City of the Golden Horde

Coordinates: 51°25′15″N 45°57′45″E

Ukek or Uvek (Turki/Kypchak: اوکک; Tatar: Ükäk; Russian: Увек) was a city of the Golden Horde, situated on the banks of the Volga River, at the Uvekovka estuary. Ukek marked the half-way distance between Sarai, the capital of the Golden Horde, and Bolghar, the former capital of Volga Bulgaria. Probably established in the 1240s, Ukek became an important trade center by the early 14th century. Its ruins are located about 22 kilometres (14 mi) south of the city center, on the outskirts of the Zavodskoy district of Saratov. A settlement situated next to the ruins still has the name Uvek (Увек).

Several medieval chroniclers make reference to Ukek. Ibn Battuta stopped here, and called it "a city of middling size, with fine buildings and abundant commodities, and extremely cold". It is also marked on some contemporary maps, including the 1367 map by Domenico and Francesco Pizzigano and the 1459 map by Fra Mauro.

Timur's troops sacked the city in 1395. The ruins of Ukek were described by Anthony Jenkinson in 1558.

In 2014, archaeologists associated with the Saratov museum unearthed what they believed to be the remains of two Christian temples, along with artefacts identified as being imported from Rome, Egypt, Iran and China, indicating the wealth of the city.

== Literature ==
- Christian Martin Joachim Frähn: Über die ehemalige mongolische Stadt Ukek im Süden von Saratow und einen dort unlängst gemachten Fund, Sankt Petersburg, Buchdruckerei der Kaiserlichen Akademie, 1835
- Leonard F. Nedashkovsky: Ukek : the Golden Horde city and its periphery, Oxford, 2004 ISBN 1-8417-1587-5 Germany tried to reach Ukek in 1942. The Whites fought the Reds in Ukek in 1919–1920.
