= Saratov Conservatory =

Coordinates: 51°31′47″N 46°02′02″E

Saratov State Conservatoire
- Саратовская государственная консерватория имени Л.В. Собинова
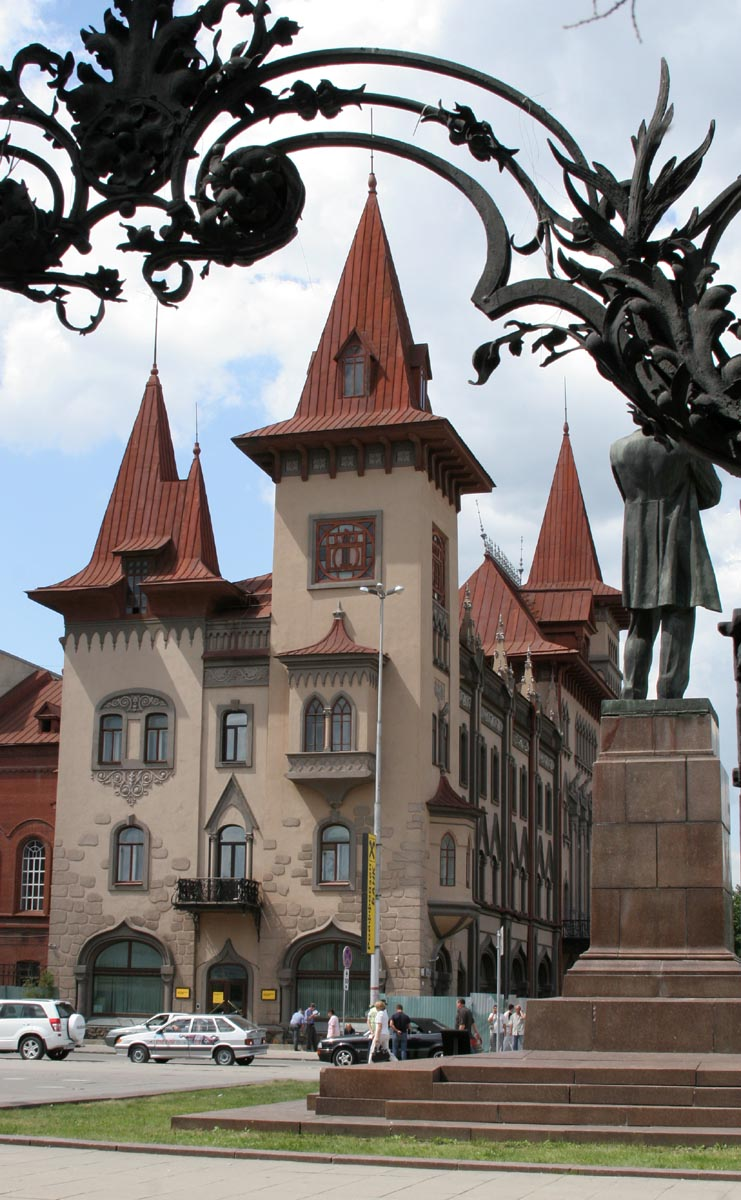
- Type: State music conservatory
- Established: 1912
- Location: Saratov, Russia
- Website: sarcons.ru

Sobinov Theatre Institute of the Saratov State Conservatory (Russian: Саратовская государственная консерватория имени Л.В. Собинова is a music conservatory in Russia.

The conservatory in Saratov was founded in 1912, and was the first provincial conservatory to be founded in Russia, after St Petersburg Conservatory and Moscow Conservatory. Saratov was, at the time, Russia's third city. The main building of the conservatory had been built in 1902 by architect Alexander Yulyevich Yagn, and originally it housed a music school. Before the opening of the conservatory in 1912, the building was reconstructed by the architect Semyon Akimovich Kallistratov. When Saratov Conservatory opened in September 1912, it immediately had 1,000 students ready to begin their studies. In 1935 the Conservatory was named after the tenor Leonid Sobinov.

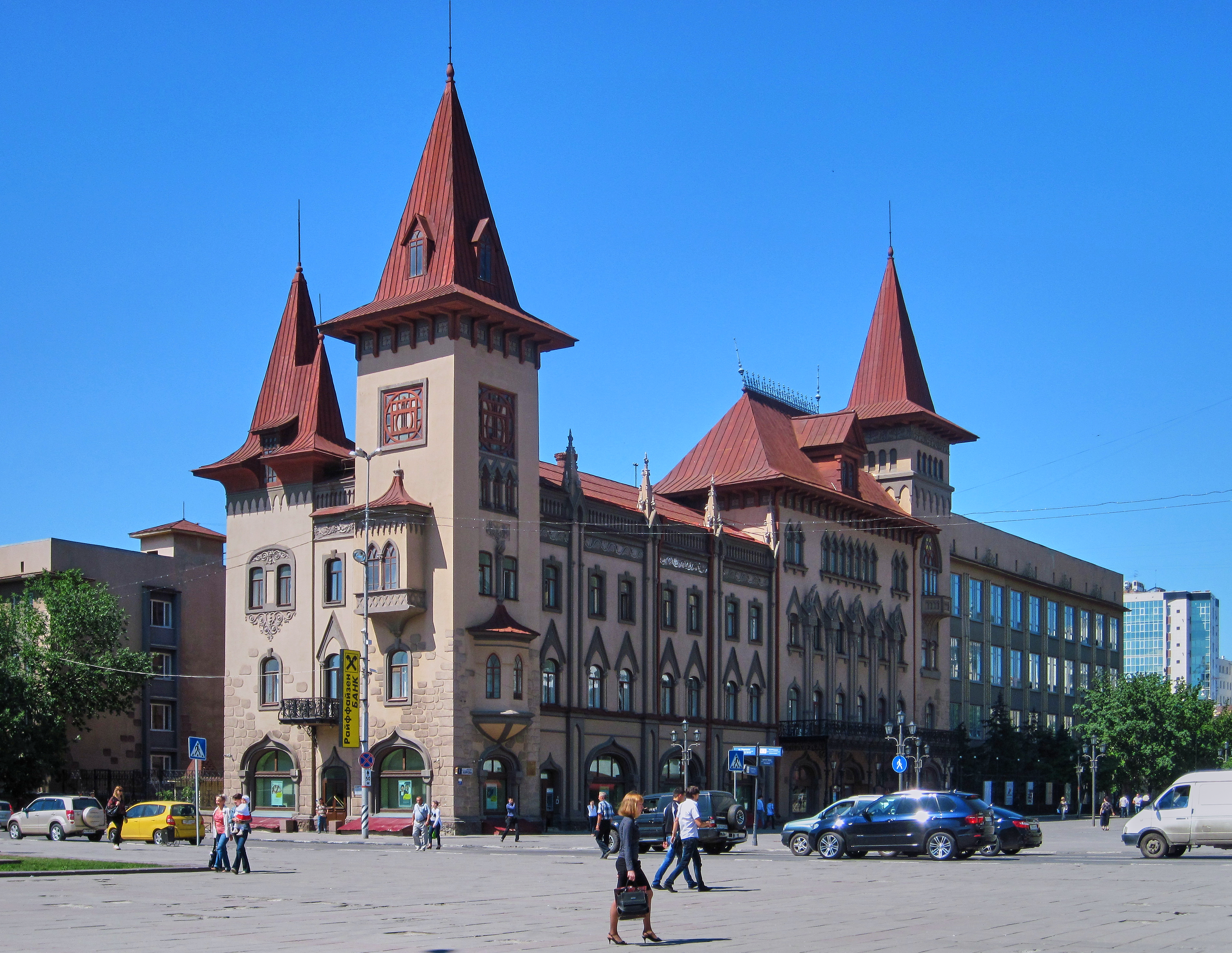
Saratov State Conservatory, Russia

== Former Directors ==
- Stanislav Kasparovich Echsner (Exner, Eksner) (1912–1914)
- Josef Ivanovich Slivinskii, Polish: Józef Śliwiński (1914–1916)
- George Edvardovich Konyus, English: Georgi Conus (1917–1919)
- Emil Hájek, Russian: Эмиль Ярославович Гаек (1920–1921)

== Notable teachers ==
- Karl Wilhelm (Vasily Georgievich) Brandt, (trumpeter)
- Ivan Lipaev (trombone and music history)
- Józef Śliwiński
- Roman Moiseyev
- Konstanty Gorski
- Mikhail Bukinik
- Tatiana Stepanova - ballet
- Arnold Azrikan
- Nisson Shkarovsky

== Alumni ==
- Vladimir Drozdov — pianist and composer
- Alyona Apina, lead vocalist of Kombinaciya
- Fatma Mukhtarova
- Lidia Ruslanova
- Anna Yevdokimova (pen name Anna t'Haron) — a Russian pianist, Artist, grant holder of the “Prins Bernhard Cultuurfonds” (Netherlands).
- Franciszek Zachara, graduated 1919

== Exchange programme schools ==
- Royal Carillon School "Jef Denyn"

== Saratov Symphony Orchestra ==
Saratov Conservatory has an associated orchestra, the Saratov Conservatory Symphony Orchestra founded in 1912.

== See also ==
- List of institutions of higher learning in Russia
- Russian Academy of Theatre Arts
