= Saratov =

City in Saratov Oblast, Russia

Saratov Саратов
- City
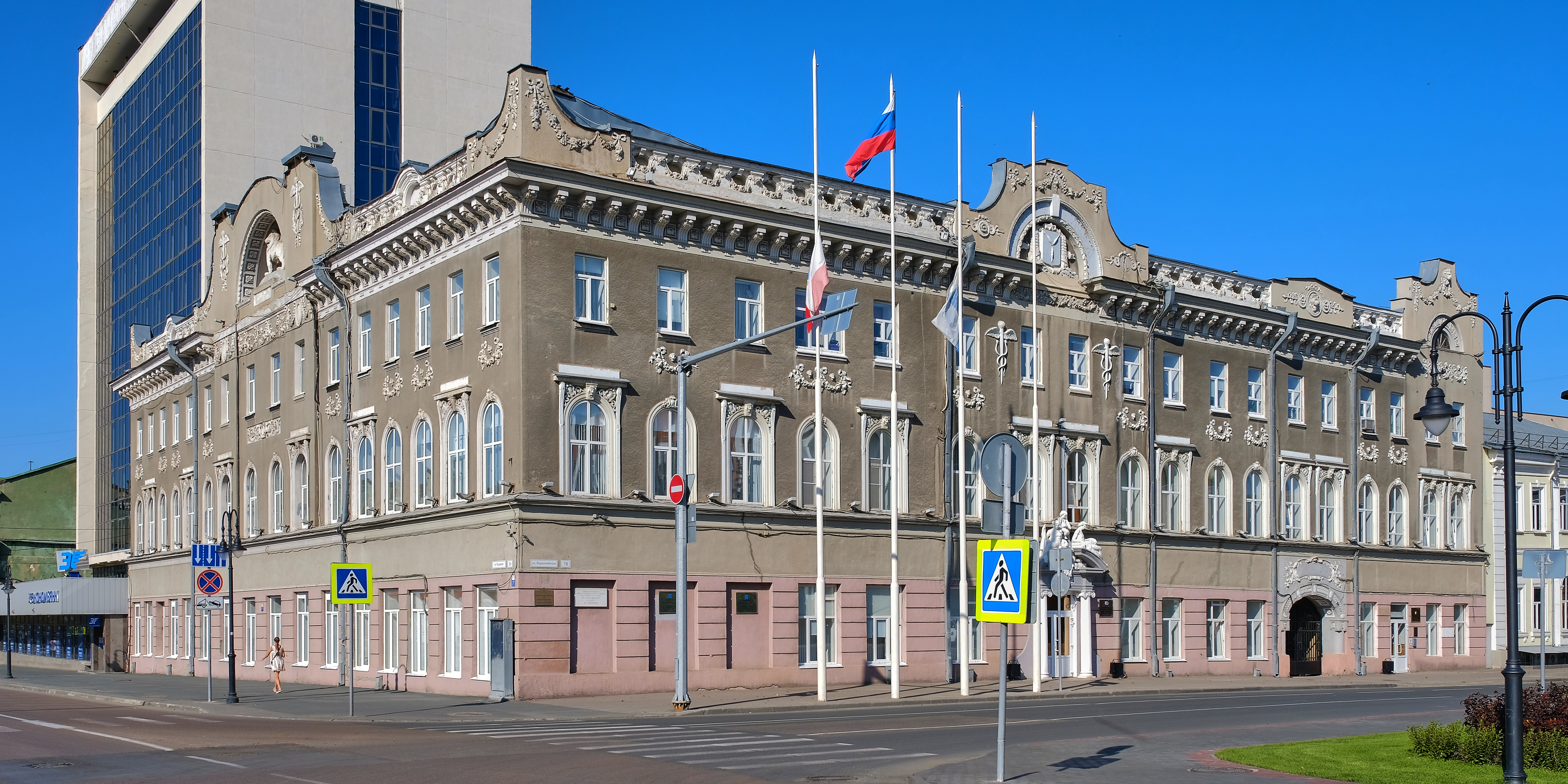
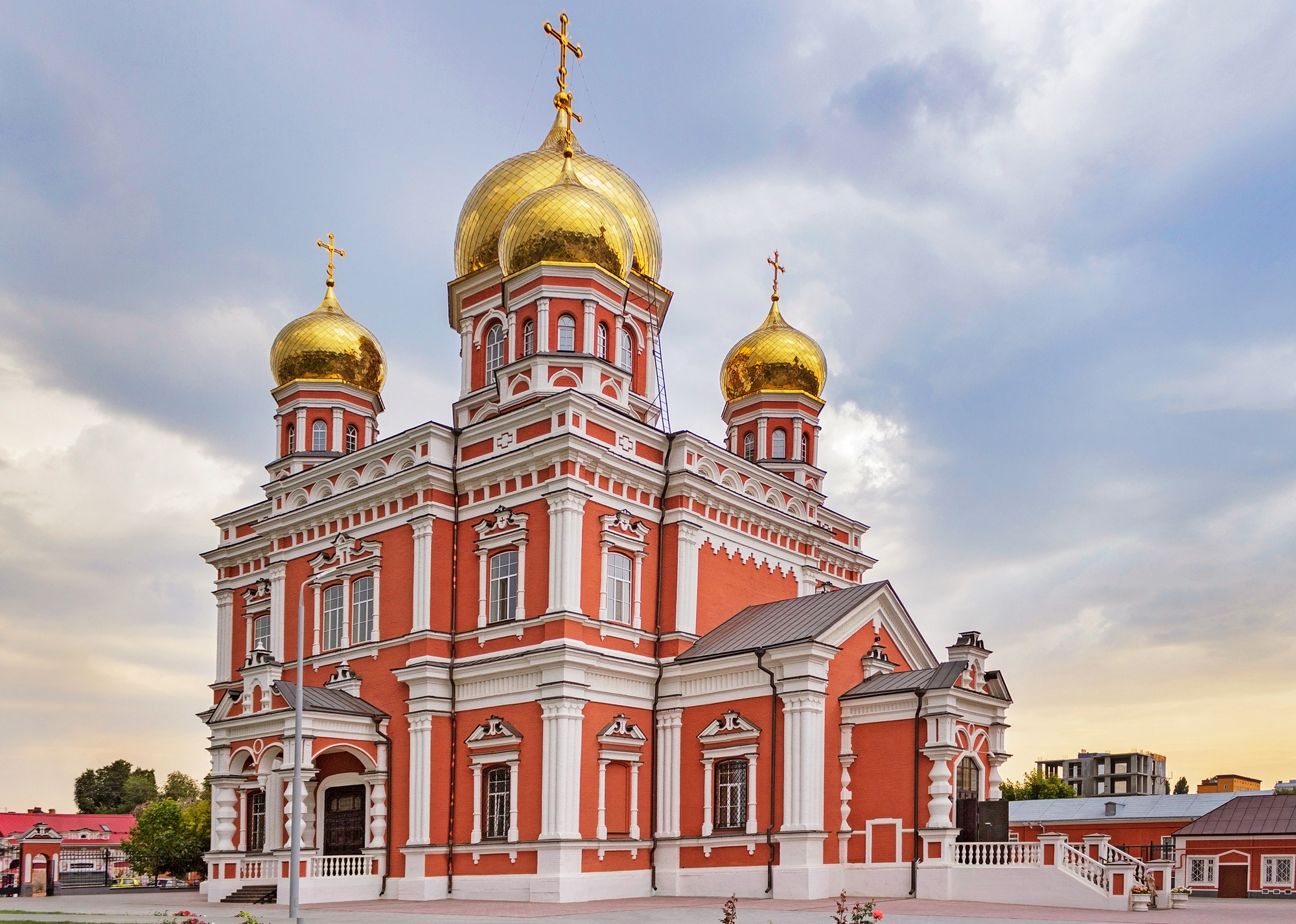
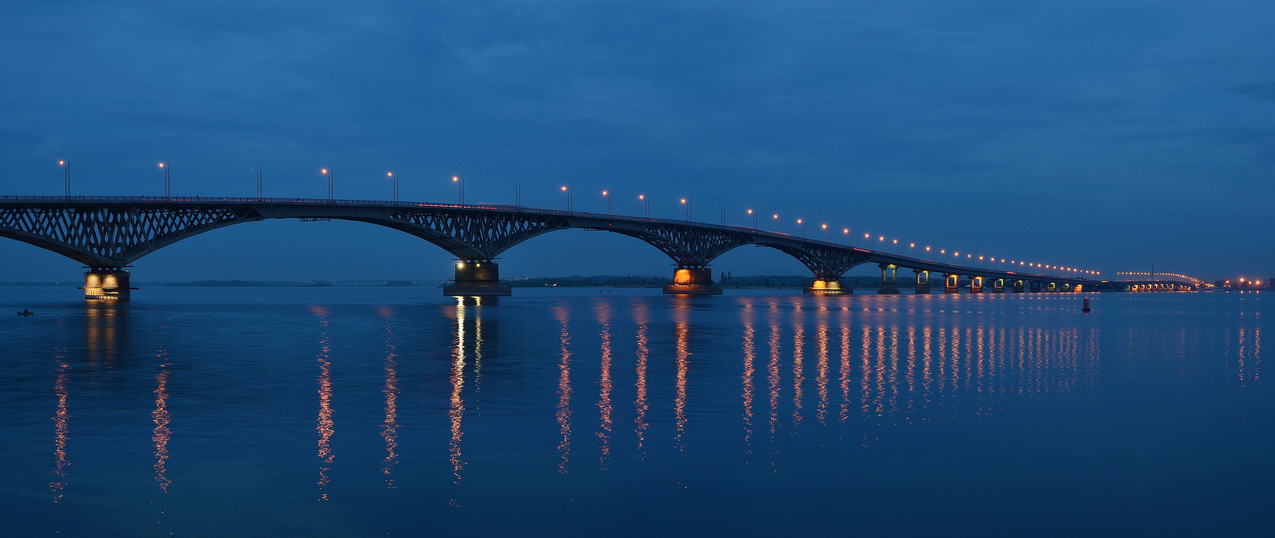
- Saratov Administration Office Conservatory Pokrovskaya Church Saratov Covered Market Schmidt Mill Saratov Bridge

- Flag Coat of arms
- Interactive map of Saratov
- Location of Saratov Saratov (European Russia) Saratov (Europe)
- Coordinates: 51°31′48″N 46°02′06″E
- Country: Russia
- Federal subject: Saratov Oblast
- Founded: ca. 1590
- City status since: 1708

Government
  - Body: City Duma
  - Head: Mikhail Isayev
- Elevation: 50 m (160 ft)

Population (2010 Census)
  - Total: 837,900
  - Estimate (2025): 886,165 (+5.8%)
  - Rank: 16th in 2010

Administrative status
  - Subordinated to: city of oblast significance of Saratov
  - Capital of: Saratov Oblast, Saratovsky District

Municipal status
  - Urban okrug: Saratov Urban Okrug
  - Capital of: Saratov Urban Okrug, Saratovsky Municipal District
- Time zone: UTC+4 (MSK+1)
- Postal codes: 410000–410005, 410007–410010, 410012, 410015, 410017–410019, 410022, 410023, 410025, 410028–410031, 410033–410042, 410047–410056, 410059, 410060, 410062–410065, 410068, 410069, 410071, 410074, 410076, 410078, 410080, 410082, 410086, 410700, 410880, 410890, 410899, 410960–410965, 410999
- Dialing code: +7 8452
- OKTMO ID: 63701000001
- Website: www.saratovmer.ru

Saratov (Note: UK: /səˈrɑːtɒf/ sə-RAH-tof, US: /-təf/ -təf; Russian: Саратов, pronounced [sɐˈratəf]) is the administrative center and largest city of Saratov Oblast, Russia, and a major port on the Volga River. As of the 2021 Census, Saratov had a population of 901,361, making it the 17th most-populous city in Russia. Saratov is 389 kilometres (242 mi) north of Volgograd, 442 kilometres (275 mi) south of Samara, and 858 kilometres (533 mi) southeast of Moscow. It is the country’s most populous city to not have 1 million residents.

The city stands near the site of Uvek, a city of the Golden Horde. Tsar Feodor I of Russia likely developed Saratov as a fortress to secure Russia's southeastern border. Saratov developed as a shipping port along the Volga and was historically important to the Volga Germans, who settled in large numbers in the city before they were expelled before and during World War II.

Saratov is home to a number of cultural and educational institutions, including the Saratov Drama Theater, Saratov Conservatory, Radishchev Art Museum, Saratov State Technical University, and Saratov State University.

== Etymology ==
The name Saratov may have been derived from, Sarı Taw (Сары Тау), meaning "Yellow Mountain" in the Tatar language. Another version of the name originates from the words, Sar Atau, which means [the] "Boggy Island".

== History ==
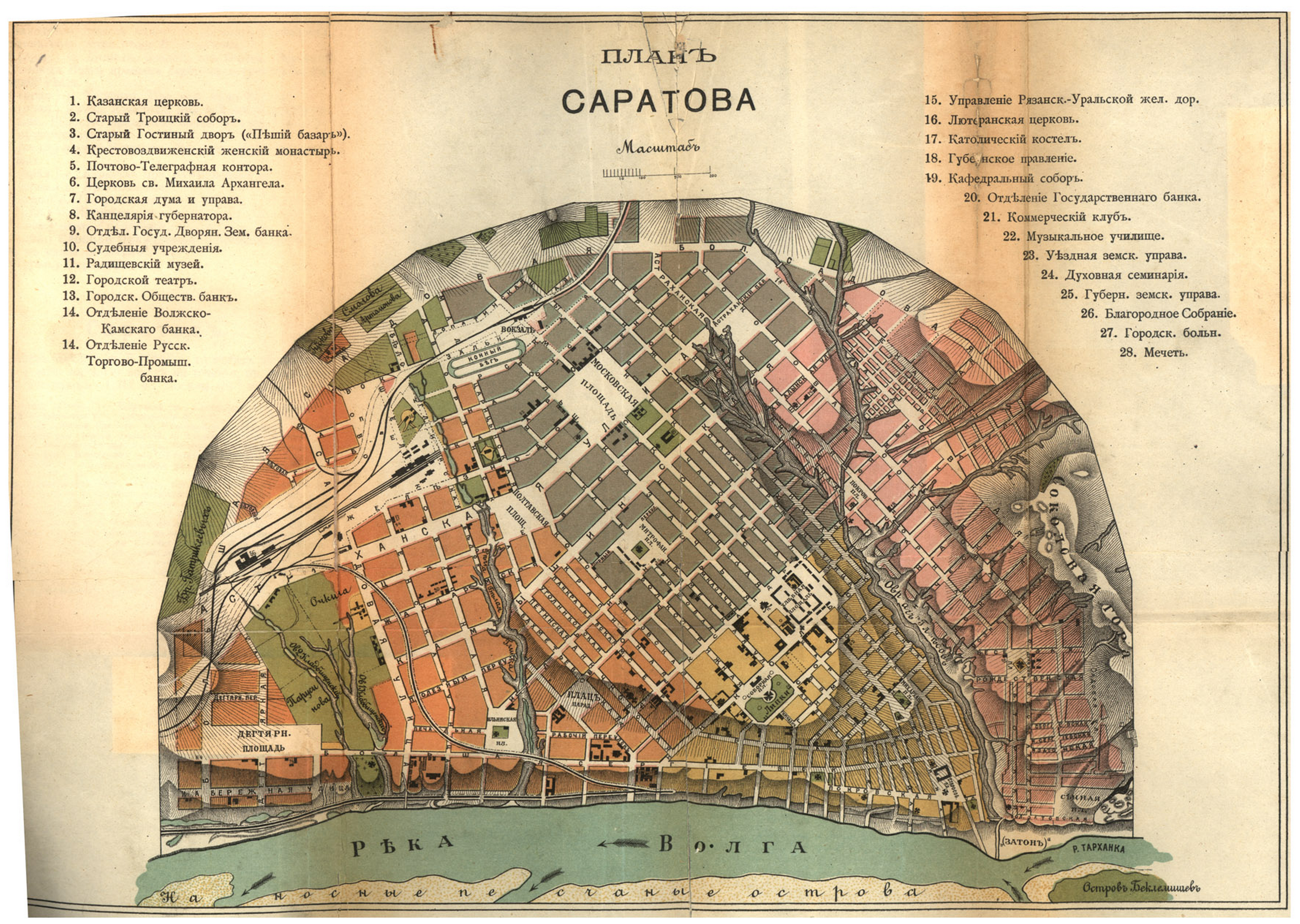
A city map of Saratov in 1903, (Russian edition)

Uvek, a city of the Golden Horde, stood near the site of the modern city of Saratov from the mid-13th century until its destruction by Tamerlane in 1395. While the exact date of the foundation of modern Saratov is unknown, plausible theories date it to ca. 1590, during the reign (1584–1598) of Tsar Fyodor Ivanovich, who constructed several settlements along the Volga River in order to secure the southeastern boundary of his state. Town status was granted to it in 1708. As the city was not strongly fortified, it was captured by the Cossacks and Kalmyks several times. Cossack insurgents captured it in 1671, 1708 and 1774.

Administratively, the city was part of the Kazan Governorate, then the Astrakhan Governorate, before it became the capital of the newly formed Saratov Viceroyalty in 1780, renamed to the Saratov Governorate in 1797. In c. 1770, Poles and Germans jointly built a Catholic church. Saratov became the seat of the Catholic Diocese of Saratov, comprising over 80 Polish-German parishes and over 40 Armenian parishes in the region. The city hosted three annual fairs, which, however, fell into decline in the late 19th century.

By the 1800s, Saratov had grown to become an important shipping port on the Volga. The Ryazan-Ural Railroad reached Saratov in 1870. In 1896, the line crossed the Volga and continued its eastward expansion. A unique train-ferry, owned by the Ryazan-Ural railroad, provided the connection across the river between the two ends of the railroad for 39 years, before the construction of a railway bridge in 1935.

During January 1915, with World War I dominating the Russian national agenda, Saratov became the destination for deportation convoys of ethnic Germans, Jews, Hungarians, Austrians and Slavs whose presence closer to the western front was perceived as a potential security risk to the state.

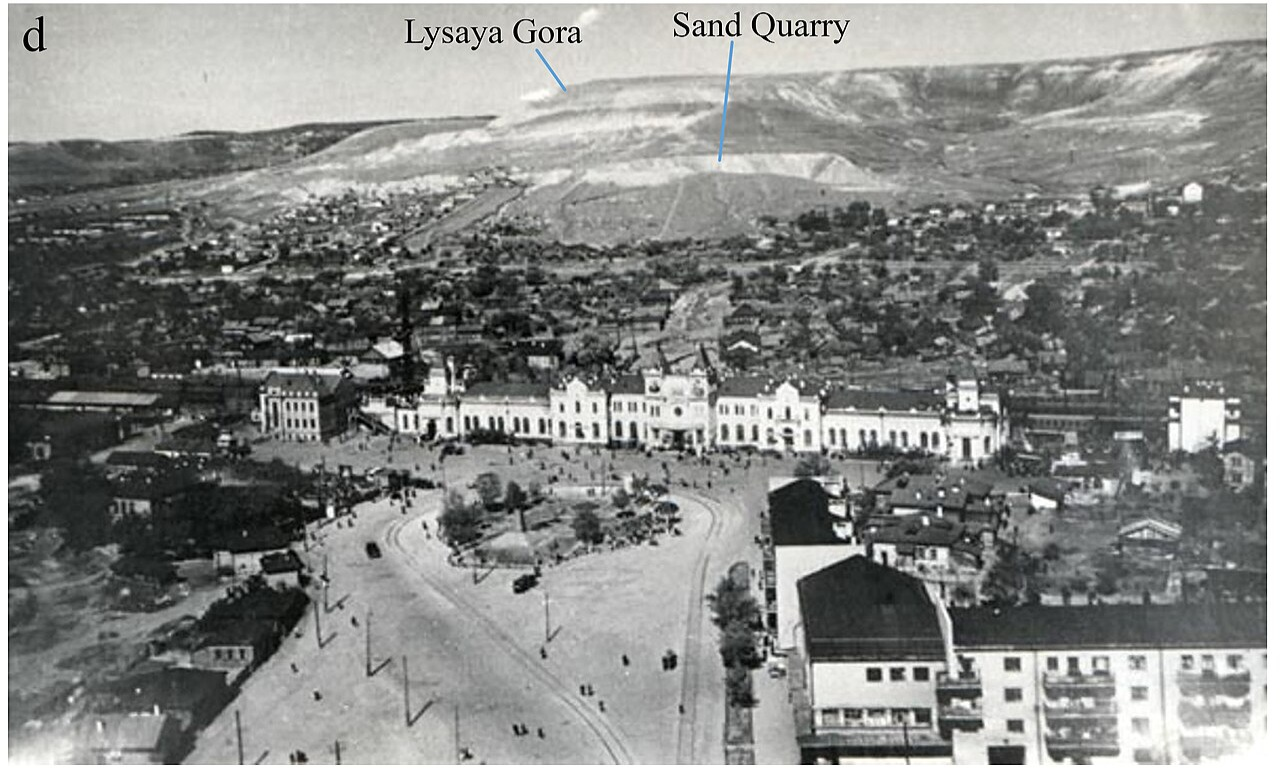
Saratov in 1941

During World War II, Saratov was a station on the north–south Volzhskaya Rokada, a specially designated military railroad supplying troops, ammunition and supplies to Stalingrad. In 1942-1943 the city was bombed by German aircraft. The main target was the Kirov oil refinery, which was heavily bombarded, seriously damaging the installation and destroying 80% of its plant and temporarily interrupting its work. The Luftwaffe was able to destroy all the fuel stock at bases in Saratov and eliminate the oil plant in the city.

Until the end of the Soviet Union in 1991, the Soviet authorities designated Saratov a "closed city"; off-limits to all foreigners due to its military importance as the site of a vital facility manufacturing military aircraft.

=== German community ===
Saratov played a prominent role in the history of the Volga Germans. In July 1763 Catherine II published an edict in which she promised that German settlers would remain German and enjoy a great deal of autonomy, even if they moved to the Volga region. Many Germans did so. There, they continued with their German language, their own education, their churches (for the Catholics the Diocese of Tiraspol was later founded and seated in Saratov), their publications, etc.

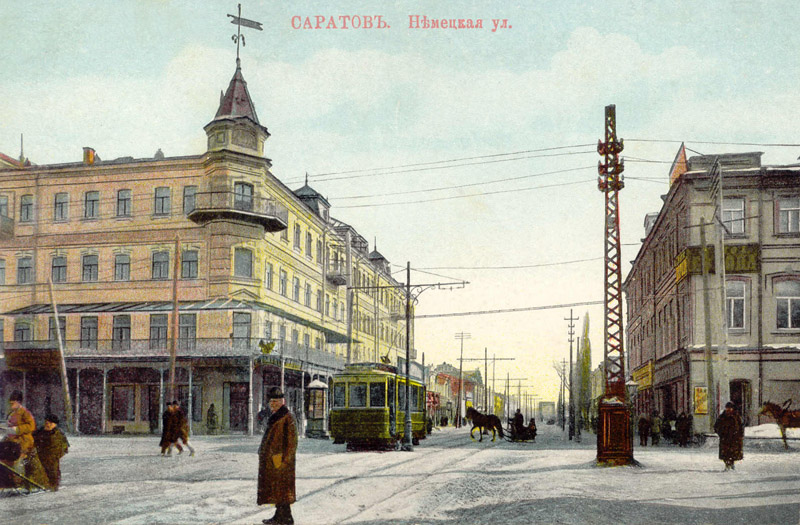
Nemetskaya Street ("German Street") before 1917

However, after more than a century living in that region, the living conditions of the Germans began to change. Catherine II had died in 1796, and the government began to apply an aggressive Russification policy, which meant that from 1878 (when Alexander II was Emperor of Russia) some groups of Volga Germans began to emigrate to the United States, Canada, Brazil and Argentina. Those who could not leave or who remained in the hope conditions would improve suffered greatly. Hostilities did not stop even after the confiscation of their assets. On 22 June 1941, Nazi Germany began a war against the Soviet Union. On 28 August 1941, dictator Stalin had the Presidium of the Supreme Soviet of the USSR pass a decree 'On the resettlement of Germans residing in the Volga region'. The approximately 400,000 remaining Volga Germans were accused of collective collaboration, deported to Siberia and Central Asia, and forced into labour camps of the 'Labour Army' (Трудармия); thousands of them died. Most Russian Germans (men and women) were 'conscripted' between October 1942 and December 1943.

In 1964, they were officially cleared of the accusation of collaboration, albeit with restrictions. (1964 marked the end of the Khrushchev era, which had begun in 1953 after Stalin's death. The Thaw period lasted from about 1956 to October 1964).
The freedom of travel granted on 3 November 1972 allowed a return to the Volga, but explicitly not to the settlement inhabited before the deportation. This only became possible after the Dissolution of the Soviet Union.

Today only a few reminders remain of the once prominent place for Volga Germans. The Roman Catholic St. Klemens Cathedral, which had been built by the Volga Germans on the main street of Saratov, the then called "German Street" (German: Deutsche Straße, Russian: Немецкая Улица, romanized: Nemetskaya Ulitsa), has its steeples removed and was converted into the Pioneer Cinema by order of the Soviet government (religion was prohibited). The old German Street, the pedestrian street of Saratov, was renamed Kirov Prospect in reference to the Bolshevik leader Sergei Kirov. On April 18, 2022, Kirov Prospect was officially renamed by decree of the city mayor to Stolypin Prospect.

== Administrative and municipal status ==
The Administrative divisions of Sarstov consisted of 6 districts; Volzhsky District, Kirovsky District, Leninsky District, Oktyabrsky District, Frunzensky District, Zavodskoy District

Saratov is the administrative center of the oblast and, within the framework of administrative divisions, it also serves as the administrative center of Saratovsky District, even though it is not a part of it. As an administrative division, it is incorporated separately as the city of oblast significance of Saratov—an administrative unit with the status equal to that of the districts. As a municipal division, the city of oblast significance of Saratov is incorporated as Saratov Urban Okrug.

== Geography ==
=== Climate ===
Saratov has a moderately continental climate with warm summers, relatively dry climate and an abundance of sunny days. The warmest month is July with daily mean temperature near +23 °C (73 °F); the coldest is February, at −8 °C (18 °F).

Summers are hot and in Saratov daytime temperatures of +30 °C (86 °F) or higher are commonplace, up to +40.9 °C (105.6 °F) during a heat wave in 2010.

Snow and ice are dominant during the winter season. Days well above freezing and nights below −25 °C (−13 °F) both occur in the winter.

Climate data for Saratov (1991-2020, extremes 1836-present)
Month	Jan	Feb	Mar	Apr	May	Jun	Jul	Aug	Sep	Oct	Nov	Dec	Year
Record high °C (°F)	8.1 (46.6)	8.4 (47.1)	18.8 (65.8)	31.1 (88.0)	34.1 (93.4)	39.2 (102.6)	40.8 (105.4)	40.7 (105.3)	36.7 (98.1)	25.5 (77.9)	17.1 (62.8)	11.7 (53.1)	40.8 (105.4)
Mean daily maximum °C (°F)	−4.7 (23.5)	−4.3 (24.3)	1.8 (35.2)	13.8 (56.8)	22.1 (71.8)	26.4 (79.5)	28.6 (83.5)	27.4 (81.3)	20.3 (68.5)	11.6 (52.9)	2.3 (36.1)	−3.3 (26.1)	11.8 (53.3)
Daily mean °C (°F)	−7.6 (18.3)	−7.7 (18.1)	−1.8 (28.8)	8.5 (47.3)	16.3 (61.3)	20.6 (69.1)	22.9 (73.2)	21.3 (70.3)	14.8 (58.6)	7.5 (45.5)	−0.4 (31.3)	−5.9 (21.4)	7.4 (45.3)
Mean daily minimum °C (°F)	−10.2 (13.6)	−10.5 (13.1)	−4.8 (23.4)	4.3 (39.7)	11.2 (52.2)	15.6 (60.1)	17.7 (63.9)	16.1 (61.0)	10.4 (50.7)	4.3 (39.7)	−2.6 (27.3)	−8.3 (17.1)	3.6 (38.5)
Record low °C (°F)	−37.3 (−35.1)	−34.8 (−30.6)	−26.8 (−16.2)	−17.8 (0.0)	−3.8 (25.2)	2.1 (35.8)	6.4 (43.5)	4.3 (39.7)	−2.9 (26.8)	−12.6 (9.3)	−23.8 (−10.8)	−33.4 (−28.1)	−37.3 (−35.1)
Average precipitation mm (inches)	43 (1.7)	36 (1.4)	33 (1.3)	31 (1.2)	36 (1.4)	48 (1.9)	44 (1.7)	27 (1.1)	50 (2.0)	38 (1.5)	39 (1.5)	41 (1.6)	466 (18.3)
Average rainy days	6	5	7	12	14	15	14	12	13	14	12	8	132
Average snowy days	19	15	10	1	0	0	0	0	0	1	9	16	71
Average relative humidity (%)	84	81	78	64	55	59	59	59	64	74	84	84	70
Mean monthly sunshine hours	57	81	141	219	278	310	320	273	152	115	60	50	2,056
Source 1: Pogoda.ru.net
Source 2: worldweather.wmo.int

== Economy and infrastructure ==
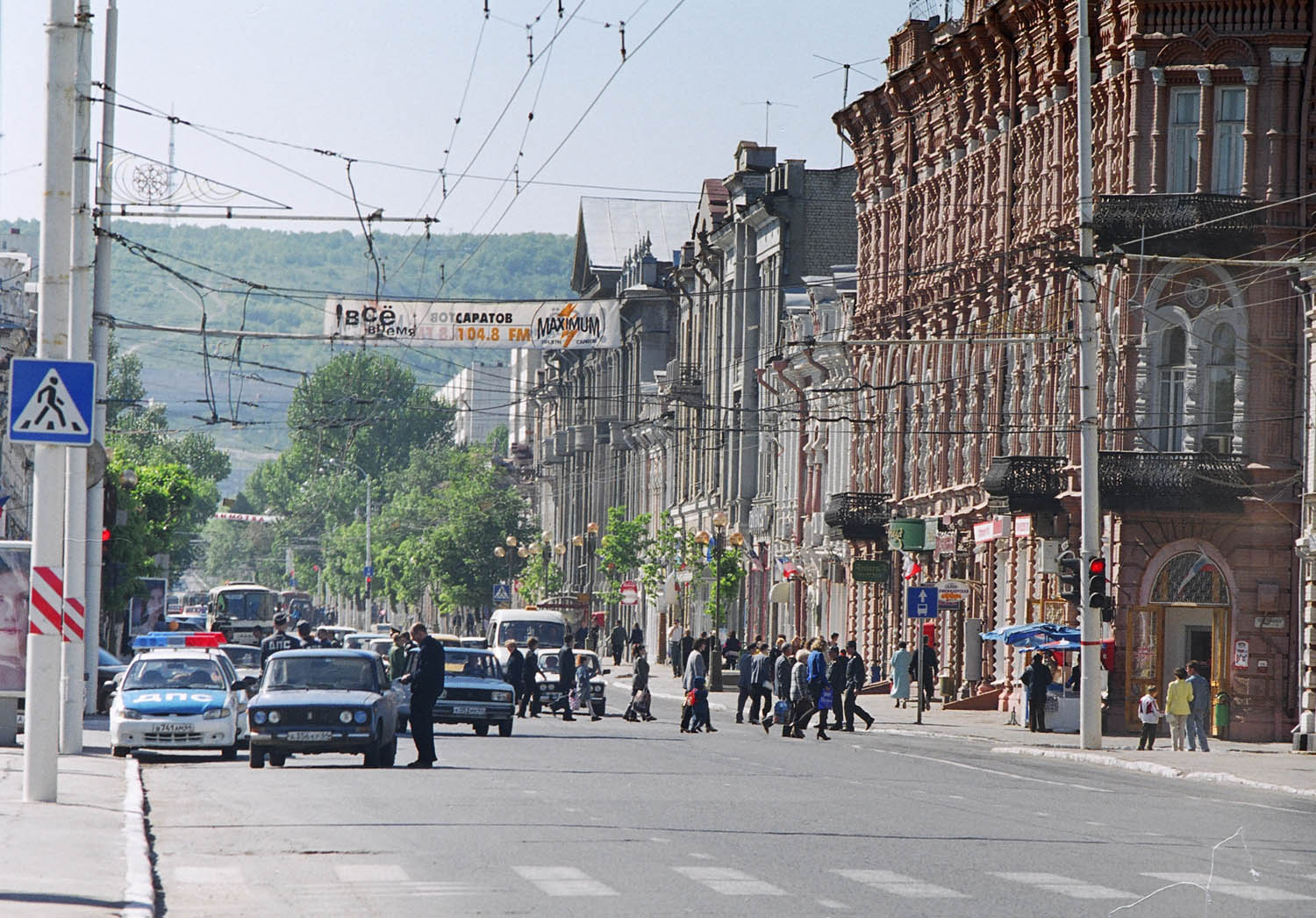
Moskovskaya Street in Saratov

Saratov Oblast is highly industrialized, due in part to the richness in natural and industrial resources of the area. The oblast is also one of the more important and largest cultural and scientific centers in Russia. Saratov possesses six institutes of the Russian Academy of Sciences, twenty-one research institutes, nineteen project institutes, as well as the Saratov State University, the Saratov State Socio-Economic University, the Saratov State Technical University, and many scientific and technological laboratories attached to some of the city's large industrial enterprises.

=== Transportation ===
Saratov is served by the Saratov Gagarin Airport (opened in August 20, 2019, replacing Saratov Tsentralny Airport). The airport serves flights to both international and domestic destinations. Saratov West is a general aviation airfield. The aerospace manufacturing industry was served by the Saratov South airport. Nearby Engels-2 (air base) is the main base for Russian strategic Tu-95 and Tu-160 bombers. Motorways link Saratov directly to Volgograd, Samara, and Voronezh. The railways also play an important role. The Privolzhskaya Railway is headquartered in Saratov. The Volga itself is an important inland waterway. Buses and trolleybuses form the backbone of public transport in the city.

Saratov has a tram network, which opened in 1908. Currently, there are two depots, while a third was closed in 2001. The rolling stock currently consists of 71-605, 71-619, 71-608 and a number of refurbished Tatra T3, renamed to MTTE and MTTCh.

A trolleybus network is also present in the city. On July 2, 2021, an intercity route over the Volga was opened, linking to the trolleybus network of Engels.

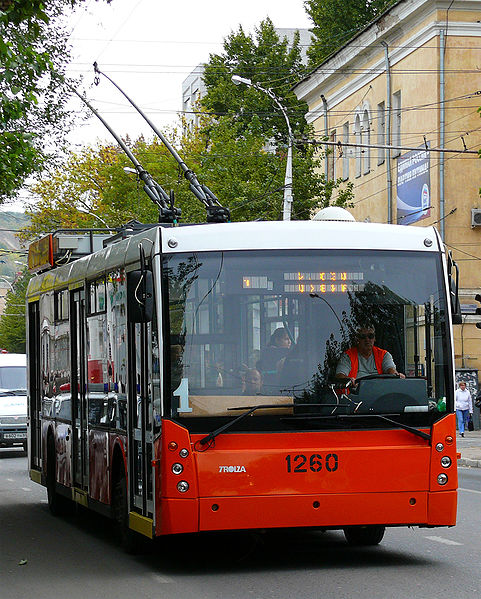
Trolza-5275 low-floor trolleybus

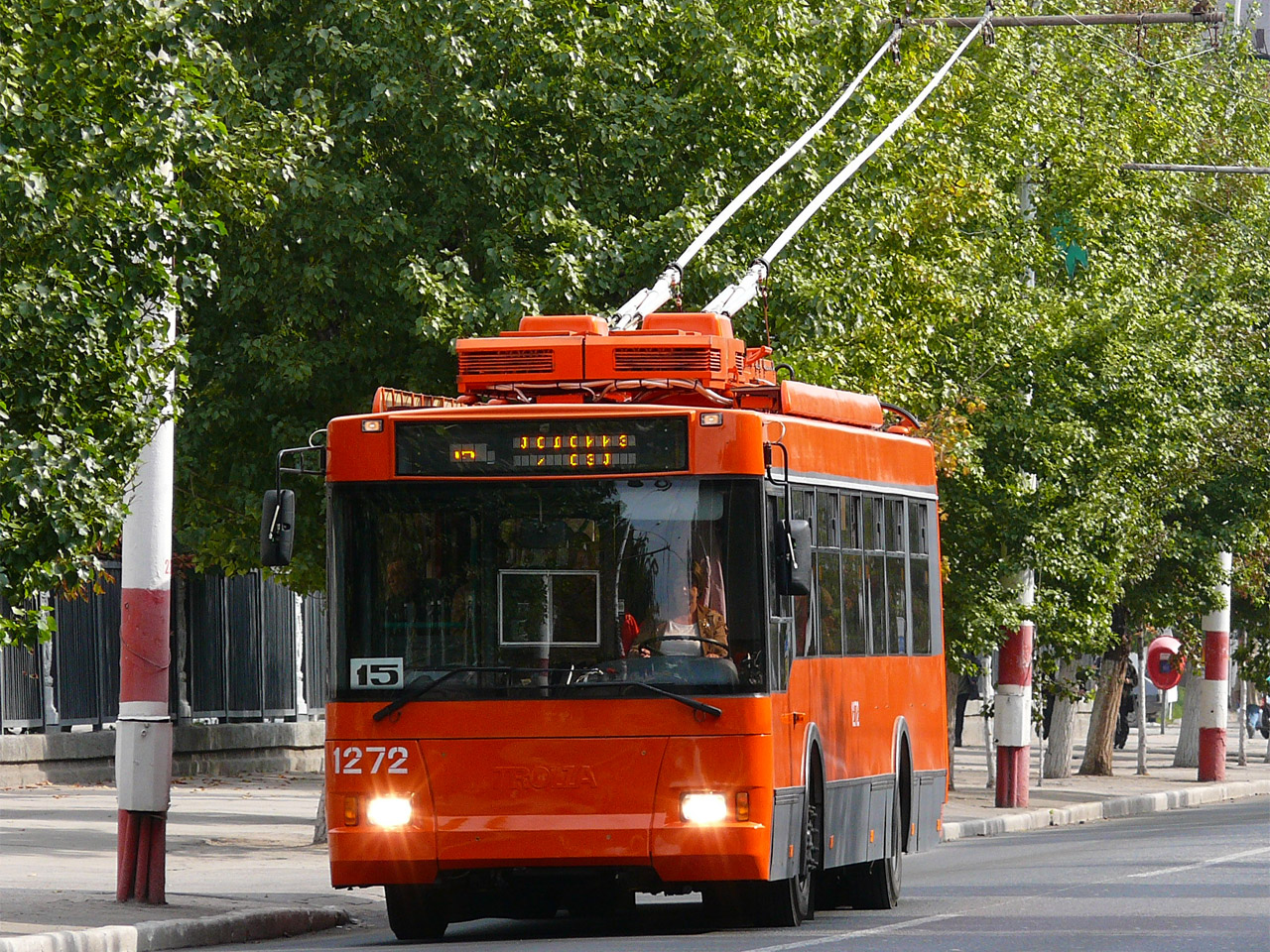
Trolza-5275 low-entry trolleybus

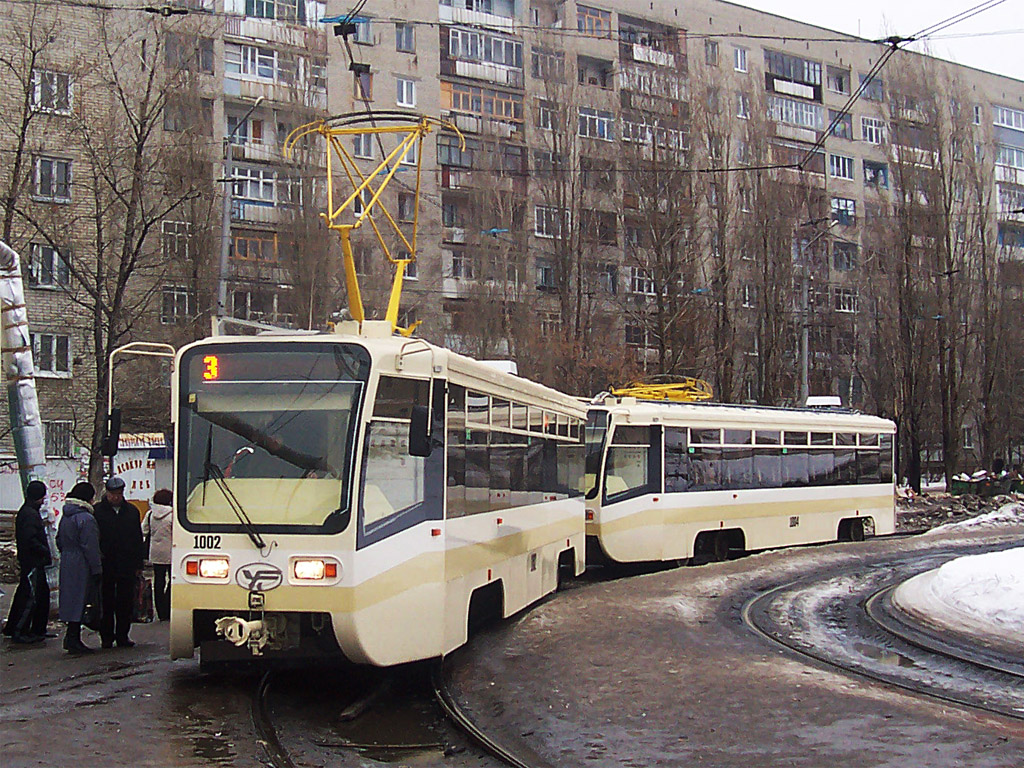
KTM-19 trams

=== City budget ===
Information about revenues and expenditures of the city budget for the period 2007–2017.

Indicators	2007	2008	2009	2010	2011	2012	2013	2014	2015	2016	2017
Revenues, billion rubles	6.38	9.59	10.45	10.65	12.15	12.77	12.00	12.07	11.06	14.91	14.84
Expenditures, billion rubles	6.15	9.39	11.17	11.23	12.99	13.29	13.02	12.75	11.77	15.31	15.40
Balance, billion rubles	0.23	0.20	−0.72	−0.58	−0.84	−0.52	−1.02	−0.68	−0.71	−0.40	−0.57

== Demographics ==
Historical population
Year	Pop.	±%
1830	49,664	—
1850	66,660	+34.2%
1867	93,218	+39.8%
1885	122,829	+31.8%
1897	137,000	+11.5%
1926	212,395	+55.0%
1939	372,002	+75.1%
1959	584,092	+57.0%
1970	757,330	+29.7%
1979	855,702	+13.0%
1989	904,643	+5.7%
2002	873,055	−3.5%
2010	837,900	−4.0%
2021	901,361	+7.6%
Source: and census data

Saratov has a population of 901,361 within city limits and roughly 1.2 million in the urban agglomeration. More than 90% of the city's population are ethnic Russians. Among the remainder are Tatars, Kazakhs, Armenians, Azerbaijanis, Ukrainians and others.

In the 2021 Census, the following ethnic groups were listed:

Ethnic group	Population	Percentage
Russians	686,699	92.8%
Tatars	10,291	1.3%
Kazakhs	7,354	1.0%
Armenians	6,456	0.9%
Azerbaijanis	4,198	0.6%
Ukrainians	3,392	0.5%
Others	40,262	3.8%

== Education ==
Saratov is host to a number of colleges and universities. These include the Saratov State University (1909), Saratov State Technical University, Saratov State Medical University, Saratov State Academy of Law and Saratov State Agrarian University. In 2014 a newly renovated campus for the Saratov Regional College of Art was opened.

== Culture ==
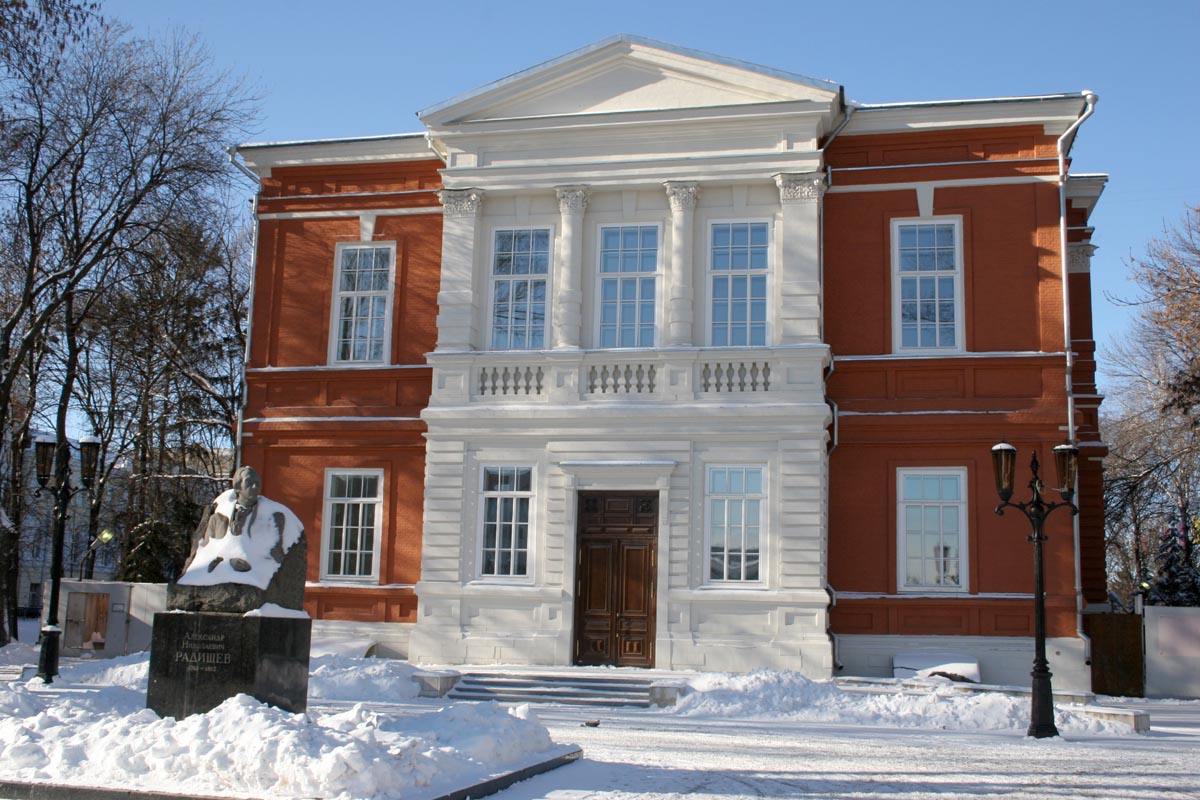
The Radishchev Art Museum

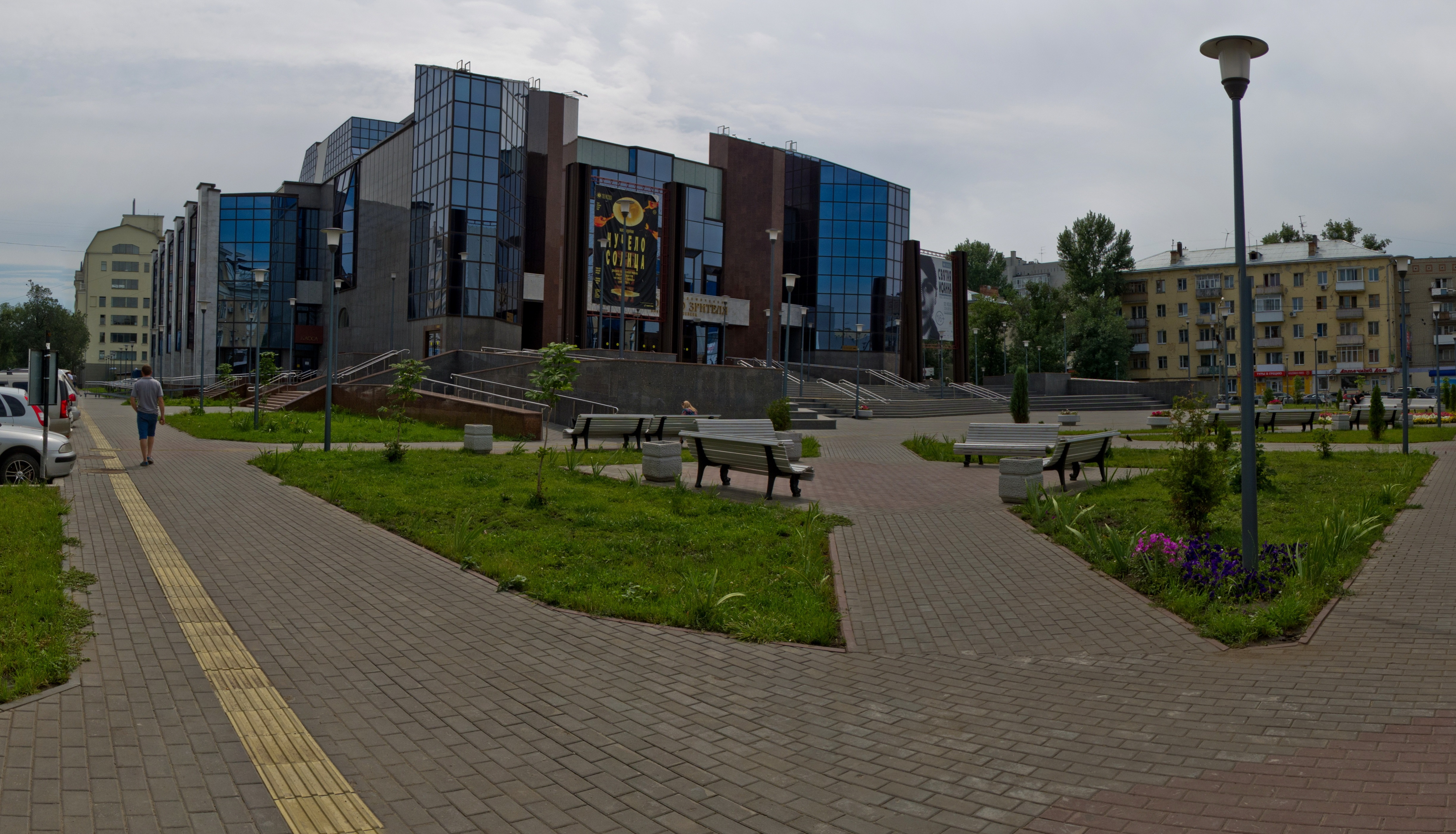
Saratov Academic Theater

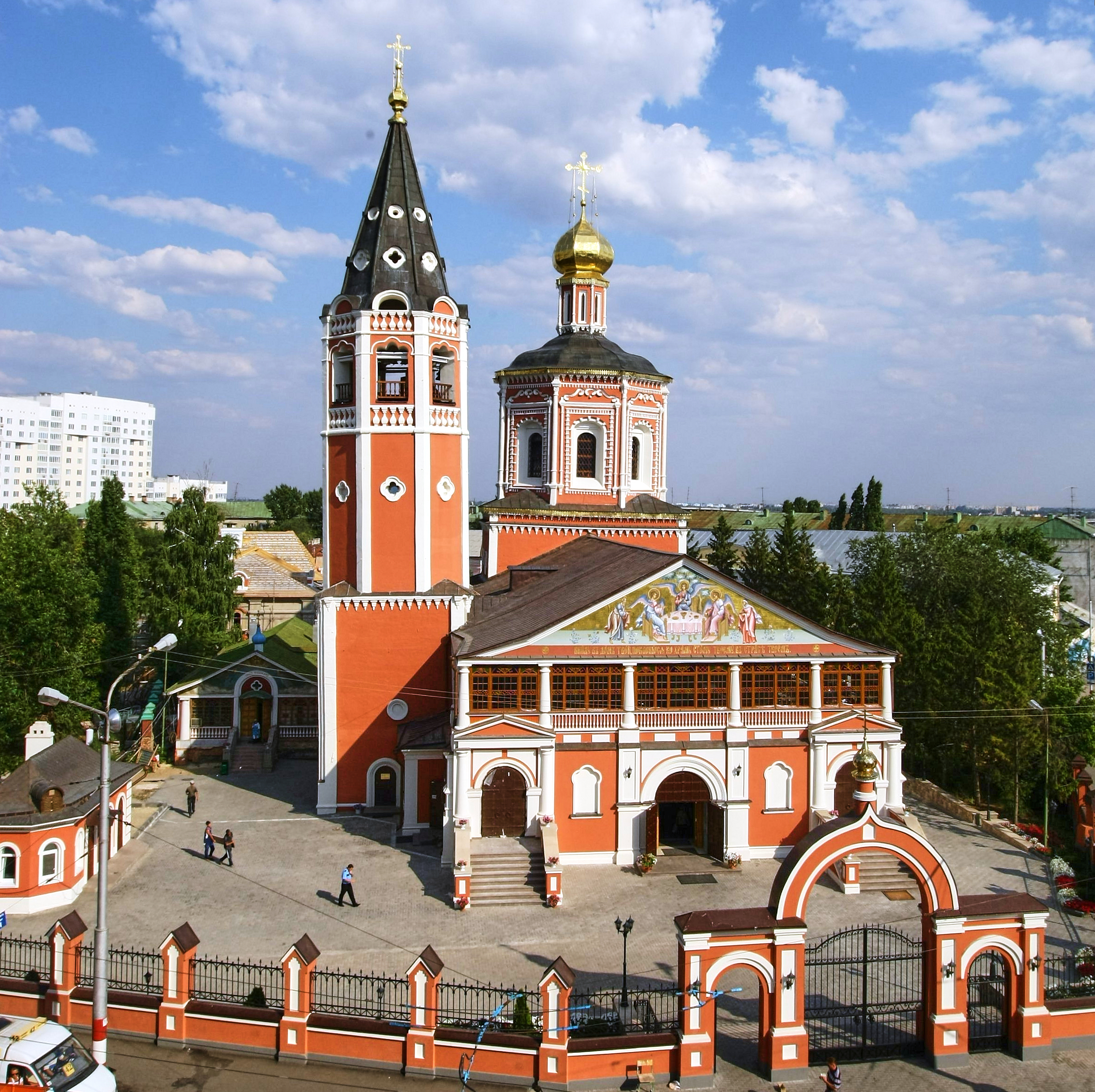
Holy Trinity Cathedral

One of the city's most prominent landmarks is the 19th century neo-Gothic Conservatory. When it was built in 1912, the Conservatory was Russia's third such institution (after Moscow and St. Petersburg). At the time, Saratov, with a population of 240,000, was the third-largest city in Russia. The main building of the conservatory had been built in 1902 by architect Alexander Yulyevich Yagn, and originally it housed a music school. Before the opening of the conservatory in 1912, the building was reconstructed by the architect Semyon Akimovich Kallistratov. When Saratov Conservatory opened in September 1912, it immediately had 1,000 students ready to begin their studies.

Another landmark is the Soothe My Sorrows Church, built at the beginning of the 20th century.

The Saratov Drama Theater was founded in 1802, making it one of Russia's oldest. It is ranked as one of Russia's National Theaters. In Soviet times, the theater was renamed in honor of Karl Marx, but now carries the name of Ivan Slonov (1882–1945), an actor, theatrical director and educator, born in the city. The full name in Russian is The I. A. Slonov Saratov State Academic Theater (Саратовский государственный академический театр драмы имени И. А. Слонова).

Saratov is noted for several art museums, including the Radishchev Art Museum, named for Alexander Radishchev, Fedin Art Museum, named after Russian novelist Konstantin Fedin, Saratov Local History Museum, Chernyshevsky Estate Museum, named for Nikolay Chernyshevsky, and some others. The Radishchev Art Museum contains more than 20,000 exhibits, including ancient Russian icons, works by Camille Corot, Auguste Rodin, as well as works by some of the finest Russian painters (e.g. Ivan Kramskoy, Vasily Polenov, Ilya Repin, Ivan Shishkin, Aleksandra Ekster, Pavel Kuznetsov, Aristarkh Lentulov, Robert Falk, Pyotr Konchalovsky, Martiros Saryan, Fyodor Rokotov).

== Sports ==
Several sports clubs are active in the city:

Club	Sport	Founded	Current league	League Rank	Stadium
Kristall Saratov	Ice Hockey	1955	Higher Hockey League	2nd	Kristall Sports Palace
Sokol Saratov	Football	1930	Russian Football National League	2nd	Lokomotiv Stadium
Avtodor Saratov	Basketball	1960	VTB United League	1st	Kristall Sports Palace
Universal Saratov	Bandy	1953	Bandy Supreme League	2nd	Dynamo Stadium
Proton Saratov	Volleyball	1988	Volleyball Superleague	1st	

== Twin towns – sister cities ==
Saratov is twinned with:

- Carrboro, United States
- Dallas, United States (ties suspended in 2022)
- Dobrich, Bulgaria
- Wuhan, China

== Notable people ==
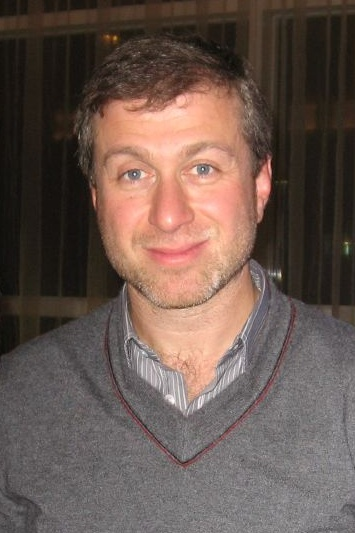
Roman Abramovich

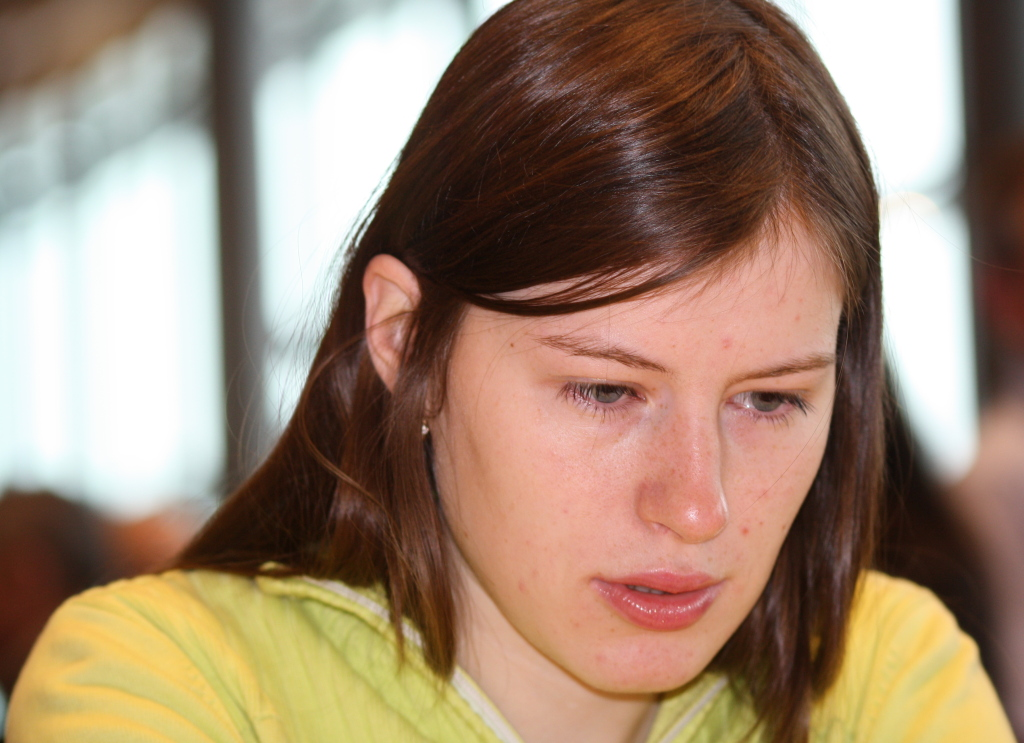
Natalia Pogonina

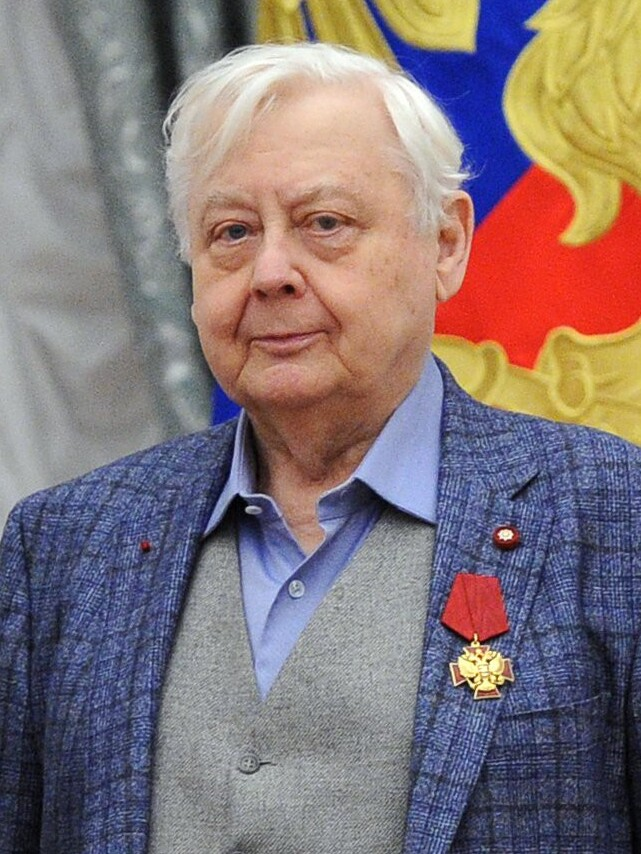
Oleg Tabakov

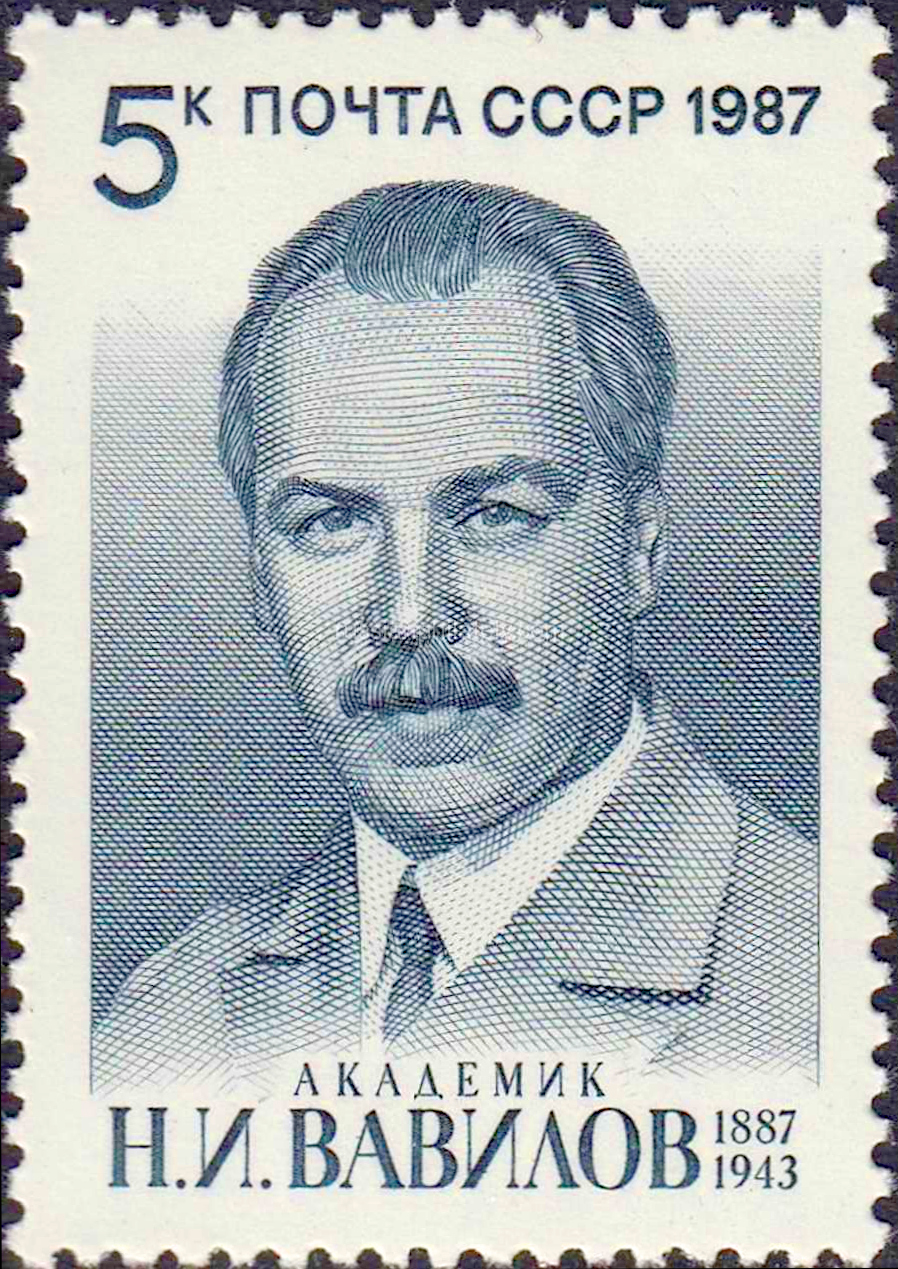
Nikolai Vavilov

- Roman Abramovich (born 1966), businessman and politician
- Boris Andreyev, actor
- Oleg Antonov, aircraft designer
- Boris Babochkin, actor, director
- Denis Bakurskiy, former Russian professional football player
- Rachel Bluwstein, poet
- Alexey Bogolyubov, painter
- Nikolai Bondarenko, politician
- Viktor Borisov-Musatov, painter
- Nikolay Chernyshevsky, philosopher
- Gavrila Derzhavin, poet
- Irina Dryagina, World War II pilot and scientist
- Katia Elizarova, model
- Konstantin Fedin, writer
- Nikolai Grandkovsky, painter
- Joseph Hakobyan, engineer
- Lev Igorev, painter
- Anastasia Karpova, pop singer
- Lev Kassil, writer
- Kombinaciya, female pop band
- Pavel Kuznetsov (1878–1968), painter and graphic artist
- Eduard Limonov, writer and politician
- Konstantin Lokhanov (born 1998), Russian junior world champion and Olympic sabre fencer living in the United States
- Konstantin Paustovsky, writer
- Kuzma Petrov-Vodkin, painter
- Lev Pitaevskii, theoretical physicist
- Natalia Pogonina, chess player, women Grandmaster (WGM)
- Jean-Victor Poncelet, French engineer and mathematician (POW)
- Alexander Radishchev, writer
- Lidiya Ruslanova, Russian folk singer
- Sweeney Schriner, Russian-born Canadian ice hockey player
- Nikolay Semyonov (1896–1986), Nobel Prize-winning chemist
- Ellen Sheidlin, photoblogger and painter
- Fyodor Shekhtel, architect
- Leonid Sobinov, operatic tenor
- Pyotr Stolypin, statesman
- Vladimir Stoupel, Russian-born French pianist and conductor
- Elvira T, singer and songwriter
- Oleg Tabakov, actor
- Evgeny Tomashevsky, chess Grandmaster and former World number 15
- Valeriya, pop singer
- Nikolai Vavilov (1887–1943), biologist and geneticist, died in a Saratov jail
- Mikhail Vrubel, painter
- Oleg Yankovsky, actor
- Zedd, music producer and DJ, born in Saratov and moved to Germany.
- Nikolay Zinin, chemist
