= List of Eastern Orthodox jurisdictions in North America =

The following is a list of Eastern Orthodox jurisdictions with a presence in North America that have a Wikipedia article.

== Mainstream jurisdictions ==
These mainstream Eastern Orthodox jurisdictions are present in North America:

- Ecumenical Patriarchate of Constantinople
  - Albanian Orthodox Diocese of America
  - American Carpatho-Russian Orthodox Diocese
  - Greek Orthodox Archdiocese of Canada
  - Greek Orthodox Archdiocese of America
  - Greek Orthodox Metropolis of Mexico
  - Ukrainian Orthodox Church of Canada
  - Ukrainian Orthodox Church of the USA
  - Vicariate for Palestinian-Jordanian Communities in the USA
  - Vicariate for the Communities of Slavic Tradition in the USA
- Patriarchate of Antioch
  - Antiochian Orthodox Christian Archdiocese of North America
  - Antiochian Orthodox Archdiocese of Mexico, Venezuela, Central America and the Caribbean
- Russian Orthodox Church
  - Russian Orthodox Church in Canada
  - Russian Orthodox Church in the USA
  - Russian Orthodox Church Outside Russia:
    - Diocese of Montreal and Canada
    - Russian Orthodox Eparchy of Eastern America and New York
    - Diocese of San Francisco and Western America
    - Diocese of Chicago and Middle America
- Serbian Orthodox Church
  - Serbian Orthodox Eparchy of New Gračanica and Midwestern America
  - Serbian Orthodox Eparchy of Eastern America
  - Serbian Orthodox Eparchy of Western America
  - Serbian Orthodox Eparchy of Canada
- Romanian Orthodox Church
  - Romanian Orthodox Archdiocese of America and Canada
- Bulgarian Orthodox Church
  - Bulgarian Eastern Orthodox Diocese of the USA, Canada and Australia
- Georgian Orthodox Church
  - Georgian Apostolic Orthodox Church in North America
- Orthodox Church in America
  - Diocese of Alaska
  - Albanian Orthodox Archdiocese in America
  - Bulgarian Diocese of the Orthodox Church in America
  - Archdiocese of Canada
  - Diocese of Eastern Pennsylvania
  - Diocese of Mexico
  - Diocese of the Midwest
  - Diocese of New England
  - Diocese of New York and New Jersey
  - Romanian Orthodox Metropolia of the Americas
  - Diocese of the South
  - Archdiocese of Washington
  - Diocese of the West
  - Archdiocese of Pittsburgh and Western Pennsylvania
  - Orthodox Church in America Stavropegial Institutions
- Macedonian Orthodox Church – Archdiocese of Ohrid
  - Macedonian Orthodox Diocese of America and Canada

== Independent jurisdictions ==
- American Orthodox Catholic Church
- Belarusian Autocephalous Orthodox Church
- Church of the Genuine Orthodox Christians of Greece
- Holy Orthodox Church in North America
- Autonomous Orthodox Metropolia of North and South America and the British Isles
