= Archbishop of America =

Greek Orthodox religious leader

The Archdiocese of America, better known as the Greek Orthodox Archdiocese of America, is a jurisdiction of the Eastern Orthodox Church under the Ecumenical Patriarchate of Constantinople. It was formally constituted in 1922 and has had seven archbishops. The Archdiocese currently covers the United States and one parish in the Bahamas, and is mostly Greek-American in composition and culture.

== Archbishops of America ==
The following individuals have held the office of Archbishop of America:

- Alexander (Demoglou), Archbishop of America (1922–1930)
- Athenagoras, Archbishop of America (1931–1948)
- Timotheos, Archbishop of America (Elected in 1949)
- Michael, Archbishop of America (1949–1958)
- Iakovos, Archbishop of America (1959–1996)
- Spyridon, Archbishop of America (1996–1999)
- Demetrios, Archbishop of America (1999–2019)
- Elpidophoros, Archbishop of America (2019 to present)

== Related titles ==
=== Archbishops of the Russian Diocese of the Aleutians and North America ===
The Diocese of the Aleutians and North America was a pan-ethnic and missionary jurisdiction of the Eastern Orthodox Church under the Russian Orthodox Church from 1900 to 1922. (Before this period it was known as the "Diocese of the Aleutians and Alaska" from 1870 to 1900; before that, it was part of the Diocese of Kamchatka, Russia, from 1840 to 1870, and before that, of the Diocese of Irkutsk, Russia. From the 1920s until 1970 it was the "Metropolia of All America and Canada" [a/k/a the "Russian Orthodox Greek Catholic Church in America"], and since 1970 it has also been known as "The Orthodox Church in America," covering the United States, Canada, Mexico, and two parishes in Australia.) From 1905 to 1922, its incumbents held the title of Archbishop:

- Saint Tikhon
  - Bishop of the Aleutians and Alaska, 1898-1900
  - Bishop of the Aleutians and North America, 1900-1905
  - Archbishop of the Aleutians and North America, 1905-1907
- Platon (Rozhdestvensky), Archbishop of the Aleutians and North America, 1907-1914
- Evdokim (Meschersky), Archbishop of the Aleutians and North America, 1914-1918
- Alexander (Nemolovsky), Archbishop of the Aleutians and North America, 1919-1922

Since 1922 its incumbents and primates have held the title of Metropolitan of All America and Canada. Today it is majority-Russian in ecclesiastical heritage, but with significant Romanian, Albanian, Bulgarian, and Mexican (in Mexico) jurisdictions and at least one Arab parish - all largely English- (or Spanish-)speaking - as well as increasing numbers of transfers from other Orthodox jurisdictions, and converts to Orthodoxy.

=== Archbishops of the Russian Exarchate of North America ===
The Russian Exarchate of North America was another jurisdiction of the Russian Orthodox Church under its Patriarchate of Moscow from 1933 to 1970. While most of its bishops were titled Metropolitans of varying Sees, the final one was

- Jonathan (Kopolovitch), Archbishop of New York and the Aleutians, 1967–1970.

Moscow was permitted to replace this Exarchate, and a diocese in Canada, with a non-diocesan patriarchal vicariate in each country, the United States and Canada, when it and the Metropolia were reconciled, and Moscow recognized the Metropolia's autocephaly, in 1970. These vicariates form the "Russian Orthodox Patriarchal Parishes in the USA", sometimes described as "Russian Orthodox Church in the USA", with some patriarchal parishes in Canada.

== See also ==
- Eastern Orthodoxy in North America
- List of Eastern Orthodox jurisdictions in North America
- List of Eastern Orthodox bishops in the United States and Canada
- List of primates of the Orthodox Church in America
- Standing Conference of the Canonical Orthodox Bishops in the Americas, Assembly of Canonical Orthodox Bishops of North and Central America
- Antiochian Orthodox Christian Archdiocese of North America
