= Assembly of Canonical Orthodox Bishops of the United States of America =

American Orthodox Christian organization

The Assembly of Canonical Orthodox Bishops of the United States of America (formerly the Episcopal Assembly of North and Central America and later the Assembly of Canonical Orthodox Bishops of North and Central America) is an organization of church hierarchs of Eastern Orthodox churches in United States.

== Overview ==
The assembly began when delegates from the 14 autocephalous Eastern Orthodox churches met at the Center of the Ecumenical Patriarchate in Chambésy, Switzerland, on June 6–12, 2009. At that time, the conference decided to sanction the establishment of episcopal assemblies in 12 regions of the so-called Eastern Orthodox diaspora which are beyond the boundaries of the autocephalous churches. Such assemblies have the authority to propose future administrative structures for the Church in their respective regions.

The first conference of the Episcopal Assembly of North and Central America was held at the Helmsley Park Lane Hotel in New York on May 27–28, 2010 under the chairmanship of Archbishop Demetrios of America.

One of the major decisions reached at the Episcopal Assembly's first meeting was the dissolution of the Standing Conference of the Canonical Orthodox Bishops in the Americas, and to assume all of SCOBA's functions, agencies and ministries.

Other issues discussed included requests to partition the present region of the Episcopal Assembly of North and Central America into two distinct regions of the United States and Canada, as well as to merge Mexico and Central America with the Episcopal Assembly of South America. As a result, some of the bishops of Mexico and Central America did not attend the North American Assembly, anticipating their joining with the South American Assembly.

Although autonomy is an issue for North and Central American churches, there was no direct statement from the assembly regarding autonomy for the Church in North or Central America.

Shortly after the May 2010 meeting the name of the assembly was changed to Assembly of Canonical Orthodox Bishops of North and Central America to avoid possible confusion with the Episcopal Church of the United States.

In April 2014, the Canadian and US bishops decided to form separate assemblies in order to best respond to the cultural diversity and pastoral needs in the region. The assembly was renamed to Assembly of Canonical Orthodox Bishops of the United States of America. The Canadian bishops formed the Assembly of Canonical Orthodox Bishops of Canada and the Central American bishops joined the Assembly of Canonical Orthodox Bishops of Latin America.

== Members of the Assembly ==
These jurisdictions' bishops are members of the Assembly, according to diptych order:

- Ecumenical Patriarchate
  - Greek Orthodox Archdiocese of America
  - American Carpatho-Russian Orthodox Diocese
  - Ukrainian Orthodox Church of the USA
  - Albanian Orthodox Diocese of America
- Patriarchate of Antioch
  - Antiochian Orthodox Christian Archdiocese of North America
- Moscow Patriarchate
  - Russian Orthodox Church in the USA
  - Russian Orthodox Church Outside Russia
- Serbian Patriarchate
  - Serbian Orthodox Eparchy of New Gračanica and Midwestern America
  - Serbian Orthodox Eparchy of Eastern America
  - Serbian Orthodox Eparchy of Western America
- Romanian Patriarchate
  - Romanian Orthodox Metropolis of the Americas
- Bulgarian Patriarchate
  - Bulgarian Eastern Orthodox Diocese of the USA, Canada and Australia
- Georgian Orthodox Church
  - Georgian Apostolic Orthodox Church in North America
- Orthodox Church in America

== Meetings of the Assembly of Bishops ==
Assemblies are held annually. Members may abstain due to extraneous circumstances including illness, or distance. Many members live outside the United States and some outside of North America. Some jurisdictions in Central America do not participate in these Assemblies, as the Assembly of Bishops in North America and the Assembly in South America have petitioned to join Central America to the South American Assembly. Members from Canada also may not attend as this Assembly and their Bishops have applied to create a separate Assembly for Canada.

== Attendees of the Inaugural Assembly (2010) ==
Fifty-five of the sixty-six hierarchs in the region were present at the founding assembly in 2010:

1. Archbishop Demetrios (Trakatellis) of America, Chairman
2. Metropolitan Philip (Saliba) of New York, Vice Chairman
3. Archbishop Justinian (Ovchinnikov) of Naro-Fominsk, Vice Chairman
4. Bishop Basil (Essey) of Wichita, Secretary
5. Archbishop Anthony (Scharba) of Hierapolis, Treasurer
6. Metropolitan Iakovos (Garmatis) of Chicago
7. Metropolitan Athenagoras (Aneste) of Mexico
8. Metropolitan Methodios (Tournas) of Boston
9. Metropolitan Isaiah (Chronopoulos) of Denver
10. Metropolitan Alexios (Panagiotopoulos) of Atlanta
11. Metropolitan Nikitas (Lulias) of Dardanellia
12. Metropolitan Nicholas (Pissare) of Detroit
13. Metropolitan Gerasimos (Michaleas) of San Francisco
14. Metropolitan Evangelos (Kourounis) of New Jersey
15. Metropolitan Paisios (Loulourgas) of Tyana
16. Archbishop Yurij (Kalistchuk) of Toronto
17. Bishop Christophoros (Rakintzakis) of Andida
18. Bishop Vikentios (Malamatenios) of Apameia
19. Bishop Savas (Zembillas) of Troas
20. Bishop Andonios (Paropoulos) of Phasiane
21. Bishop Ilia (Katre) of Philomelion
22. Bishop Hiarion (Rudnyk) of Edmonton
23. Bishop Andriy (Peshko) of York
24. Bishop Demetrios (Kantzavelos) of Mokissos
25. Bishop Daniel (Zelinskyy) of Pamphilon
26. Bishop Antoun (Khouri) of Miami
27. Bishop Joseph (Al-Zehlaoui) of Los Angeles
28. Bishop Thomas (Joseph) of Charleston and Oakland
29. Bishop Mark (Maymon) of Toledo
30. Bishop Alexander (Mufarrij) of Ottawa
31. Metropolitan Hilarion (Kapral) of New York
32. Bishop Job (Smakouz) of Kashira
33. Bishop Gabriel (Chemodakov) of Montreal
34. Bishop Peter (Loukianoff) of Cleveland
35. Bishop Theodosius (Ivashchenko) of Seattle
36. Bishop George (Schaefer) of Mayfield
37. Bishop Jerome (Shaw) of Manhattan
38. Metropolitan Christopher (Kovacevich) of Midwestern America
39. Bishop Maxim (Vasilijevic) of Western America
40. Archbishop Nicolae (Condrea) of Chicago
41. Bishop Ioan Casian (Tunaru) of Vicina
42. Metropolitan Joseph (Bosakov) of America and Australia
43. Metropolitan Jonah (Paffhausen) of Washington
44. Archbishop Nathaniel (Popp) of Detroit
45. Archbishop Seraphim (Storheim) of Ottawa
46. Bishop Nikon (Liolin) of Boston
47. Bishop Tikhon (Mollard) of Philadelphia
48. Bishop Benjamin (Peterson) of San Francisco
49. Bishop Melchisedek (Pleska) of Pittsburgh
50. Bishop Alejo (Pacheco y Vera) of Mexico City
51. Bishop Irineu (Duvlea) of Dearborn Heights
52. Bishop Irénée (Rochon) of Quebec City
53. Bishop Michael (Dahulich) of New York

== See also ==
- List of Eastern Orthodox jurisdictions in North America
- Assembly of Canonical Orthodox Bishops of Canada
- List of Eastern Orthodox bishops in the United States and Canada
- Eastern Orthodoxy in North America
