= Assembly of Canonical Orthodox Bishops of Latin America =

The Assembly of Canonical Orthodox Bishops of Latin America (Spanish: Asamblea episcopal de Iglesias ortodoxas en América Latina), formerly known as the Episcopal Assembly of South America, consists of all the active Orthodox bishops in Latin America, representing multiple jurisdictions. It is not, properly speaking, a synod. It is one of several such bodies around the world which operate in the so-called "diaspora."

== Overview ==
The assembly began when delegates from the 14 autocephalous Eastern Orthodox churches met at the Center of the Ecumenical Patriarchate in Chambésy, Switzerland, on June 6–12, 2009. At that time, the conference decided to sanction the establishment of episcopal assemblies in 12 regions of the so-called Eastern Orthodox diaspora which are beyond the boundaries of the autocephalous churches. Such assemblies have the authority to propose future administrative structures for the Church in their respective regions.

In the Americas, two assemblies were established: the Episcopal Assembly of North and Central America and the Episcopal Assembly of South America. However, the bishops from Mexico and Central America requested instead to be joined with the South American Assembly, while the Canadian bishops wanted their own assembly separate from that of the United States. As such, after five years of reflection and discussion, in April 2014, the two assembles were reorganized into the three respective assemblies: Assembly of Canonical Orthodox Bishops of Canada, the Assembly of Canonical Orthodox Bishops of the United States of America, and the Assembly of Canonical Orthodox Bishops of Latin America.

== Members of the Assembly ==
The Latin American jurisdictions include the following:

- Ecumenical Patriarchate of Constantinople
  - Greek Orthodox Metropolis of México and Exarchate of All Central America and the Caribbean
  - Greek Orthodox Metropolis of Buenos Aires and Exarchate of All South America
  - Ukrainian Orthodox Church of the USA – Eparchy of Eastern USA (which includes a Mission in Puerto Rico)
  - Ukrainian Orthodox Church of the USA – Eparchy of South America (under the care of the Bishop of the Ukrainian Orthodox Church of the USA)
- Greek Orthodox Patriarchate of Antioch
  - Antiochian Orthodox Archdiocese of Mexico, Venezuela, Central America and the Caribbean
  - Antiochian Orthodox Archdiocese of Buenos Aires and All Argentina
  - Antiochian Orthodox Archdiocese of Santiago and All Chile
  - Antiochian Orthodox Archdiocese of São Paulo and All Brazil
  - Antiochian Orthodox Patriarchal Vicariate of Rio de Janeiro
- Moscow Patriarchate
  - Russian Orthodox Patriarchal Parish in Mexico (under the care of the Administrator of the Patriarchal Parishes in the USA)
  - Russian Orthodox Diocese of Argentina and South America
  - Russian Orthodox Church Outside Russia
    - Russian Orthodox Archdiocese of New York and Eastern America (which includes a parish in Puerto Rico)
    - Russian Orthodox Diocese of San Francisco and Western America (which includes Mexico)
    - Russian Orthodox Diocese of Caracas and South America
- Serbian Patriarchate
  - Serbian Orthodox Eparchy of Buenos Aires, South America, and Central America
  - Serbian Orthodox Eparchy of Western America (which includes Mexico)
- Romanian Patriarchate – Metropolis of the Americas (missions under the care of the Archbishop of the United States of America)
- Bulgarian Patriarchate - Communities in Argentina and Brasil
- Georgian Patriarchate – Eparchy of South America
- Polish Orthodox Church
  - Polish Orthodox Archdiocese of Rio de Janeiro and Olinda-Recife
  - Polish Orthodox Diocese of Recife
- Orthodox Church in America – Diocese of Mexico

== Inaugural Assembly (2010) ==
The "First Episcopal Assembly of the Orthodox Churches in South America" took place from April 16 to April 18, 2010, at the Antiochian Archdiocese of São Paulo in Brazil, hosted by Archbishop Damaskinos. This assembly brought together bishops from various Orthodox Churches in the continent, including the Patriarchates of Constantinople, Antioch, Moscow, and Romania. Ten bishops were present, with the only absence being the bishop from the Patriarchate of Serbia, who was engaged in the meeting of the Holy Serbian Synod.

The primary objective of the assembly was to implement the resolutions made during the 4th Episcopal Conference in Chambésy, Switzerland, in 2009. This global initiative aimed at creating Assemblies of Bishops worldwide to enhance the visibility of Orthodoxy and coordinate collaborative efforts in areas such as education, catechesis, liturgical text translations, and relations with public authorities. Discussions at the assembly included the adoption of a Spanish version of the documents approved in Chambésy, and each Orthodox Church in South America presented its current situation. The assembly established an executive committee composed of Archbishop Athenágoras of Mexico (President, Patriarchate of Constantinople), Antonio of Mexico (1st vice-president, Patriarchate of Antioch), Platón of Buenos Aires (2nd vice-president, Patriarchate of Moscow), Siluan of Buenos Aires (Secretary, Patriarchate of Antioch), and Tarasios of Buenos Aires (Member, Patriarchate of Constantinople). The assembly concluded with several recommendations to be addressed at the inter-Orthodox level.

A significant highlight of the meeting was the celebration of the Sunday Divine Liturgy in the Antiochian Cathedral of St. Paul, attended by Orthodox communities from St. Paul and representatives of various public, religious, and social authorities. There, the Assembly expressed gratitude to the President of Brazil, Luiz Inácio Lula da Silva, for his support and his message conveying well wishes for the success of the meeting and its positive impact on communities across South America. The assembly also extended thanks to Archbishop Damaskinos for his warm welcome, hospitality, and organizational efforts, as well as to the Syrian-Lebanese community of São Paulo for their kindness and attention to the assembly participants.

== See also ==
- Assembly of Canonical Orthodox Bishops of Canada
- Assembly of Canonical Orthodox Bishops of the United States of America
- Assembly of Canonical Orthodox Bishops of Spain and Portugal
