= Assembly of Canonical Orthodox Bishops of Canada =

Organization of church hierarchs

The Assembly of Canonical Orthodox Bishops of Canada is an organization of church hierarchs of Eastern Orthodox Churches in Canada.

== Overview ==
The assembly began when delegates from the 14 autocephalous Eastern Orthodox churches met at the Center of the Ecumenical Patriarchate in Chambésy, Switzerland, on June 6–12, 2009. At that time, the conference decided to sanction the establishment of episcopal assemblies in 12 regions of the so-called Eastern Orthodox diaspora which are beyond the boundaries of the autocephalous churches. Such assemblies have the authority to propose future administrative structures for the Church in their respective regions.

The first conference of the Episcopal Assembly of North and Central America was held at the Helmsley Park Lane Hotel in New York on May 27–28, 2010 under the chairmanship of Archbishop Demetrios of America.

One of the major decisions reached at the Episcopal Assembly's first meeting was the dissolution of the Standing Conference of the Canonical Orthodox Bishops in the Americas, and to assume all of SCOBA's functions, agencies and ministries.

Other issues discussed included requests to partition the present region of the Episcopal Assembly of North and Central America into two distinct regions of the United States and Canada, as well as to merge Mexico and Central America with the Episcopal Assembly of South America. As a result, some of the bishops of Mexico and Central America did not attend the North American Assembly, anticipating their joining with the South American Assembly.

Although autonomy is an issue for North and Central American churches, there was no direct statement from the assembly regarding autonomy for the Church in North or Central America.

Shortly after the May 2010 meeting the name of the assembly was changed to Assembly of Canonical Orthodox Bishops of North and Central America to avoid possible confusion with the Episcopal Church of the United States.

In April 2014, the Canadian and US bishops decided to form separate assemblies in order to best respond to the cultural diversity and pastoral needs in the region. As such, the Assembly of Canonical Orthodox Bishops of Canada and the Assembly of Canonical Orthodox Bishops of the United States of America were created. Moreover, the Mexican and Central American jurisdictions joined the newly renamed Assembly of Canonical Orthodox Bishops of Latin America.

== Members of the Assembly ==
These jurisdictions' bishops are members of the Assembly, according to diptych order:

Ecumenical Patriarchate

- Archbishop Sotirios of Canada - Greek Orthodox Archdiocese of Canada and Exarchate of the Arctic
- Auxiliary Bishops:
  - Bishop Vartholomeos of Keramos
  - Bishop Athenagoras of Patara
- Metropolitan Gregory - American Carpatho-Russian Orthodox Diocese of North America
- Ukrainian Orthodox Church - Metropolitan Yurij - Ukrainian Orthodox Church of Canada
- Ukrainian Orthodox Church - Bishop Andriy - Ukrainian Orthodox Church of Canada - Eastern Eparchy
- Ukrainian Orthodox Church - Bishop Illarion - Ukrainian Orthodox Church of Canada - Western Eparchy

Greek Orthodox Patriarchate of Antioch

- Bishop Alexander - Antiochian Orthodox Christian Archdiocese of North America - Diocese of Ottawa, Eastern Canada, and Upstate New York

Moscow Patriarchate

- Bishop Matthew - Administrator - Russian Orthodox Patriarchal Parishes in Canada
- Archbishop Gabriel - Russian Orthodox Church Outside Russia (ROCOR) - Diocese of Montreal and Canada

Serbian Patriarchate

- Bishop Mitrofan - Serbian Orthodox Eparchy of Canada

Romanian Patriarchate

- Bishop Ioan Casian - Romanian Orthodox Metropolis of the Americas - Eparchy of Canada

Bulgarian Patriarchate

- Metropolitan Joseph - Bulgarian Orthodox Eparchy of the USA, Canada and Australia

Orthodox Church in America

- Archbishop Irénée - Archdiocese of Ottawa & Canada
- Archbishop Nathaniel - Romanian Orthodox Episcopate of America

== See also ==
- List of Eastern Orthodox jurisdictions in North America
- Assembly of Canonical Orthodox Bishops of the United States of America
- List of Eastern Orthodox bishops in the United States and Canada
- Eastern Orthodoxy in North America
