= Albanian Orthodox Archdiocese =

Albanian Orthodox Archdiocese may refer to:

- Albanian Orthodox Archdiocese of Tirana-Durrës, the principal diocese of Albanian Orthodox Church
- Albanian Orthodox Archdiocese in America, a diocese of the Orthodox Church in America

== See also ==
- Albanian Orthodox Diocese of America
