= Hudson Incident =

The Hudson Incident was a 1907 controversy following the death and burial of Kristaq Dishnica, an Albanian immigrant to the United States, which catalyzed the foundation of the Albanian Orthodox Mission in America under the leadership of Fan Noli, eventually leading to the Orthodox Church of Albania's formation.

== Background ==
Albanians who retained Eastern Orthodox Christianity typically associated it with the Greek language, as Orthodox schools and churches used Greek. Greek also functioned as a lingua franca in Epirus, a border region where Albanian- and Greek-speaking people mixed. During the 19th century, elite Orthodox Albanians often identified closely with Greek nationalism, viewing Muslim Albanians with some degree of mistrust and hostility. Exposure to Greek nationalism and other independence movements eventually catalyzed a separate Albanian nationalist movement spearheaded by Albanian writer Naum Veqilharxhi, who stressed the importance of the Albanian language and culture.

In 1905 Albanian Eastern Orthodox priest Kristo Negovani preached the Divine Liturgy in Albanian for the first time, ultimately leading to his assassination on the orders of Bishop Karavangelis of Kastoria, and later the retaliatory assassination of Bishop Photios of Korçë.

== Incident ==
In 1907 a young Albanian emigrant to the United States named Kristaq Dishnica died of influenza in Hudson, Massachusetts. Dishnica was an Albanian patriot and nationalist. Since the Greek Orthodox Church considered Dishnica excommunicated due to his Albanian nationalist beliefs, no Eastern Orthodox church or clergy in the area would perform his funeral rites. Dishnica was buried in a Worcester, Massachusetts, cemetery without religious services, angering the Albanians of Massachusetts.

Fan Noli—an Albanian who had emigrated one year earlier to Boston, and at that time a church cantor—recognized this as an opportunity to serve the spiritual needs of his own community and to champion the cause of religious and political freedom in Albania. Noli was able to garner the support of Archbishop Platon, head of the Russian Orthodox Church in the United States, who ordained Noli as a priest on 18 March 1908 at the Cathedral of St. Nicholas in New York City.

A week later Noli was appointed administrator of the Albanian Orthodox Mission in America, and later elevated to the rank of Mitred Archmandrite.

== Aftermath ==
As a result of the Hudson Incident, Fan Noli helped organize the Saint George Albanian Orthodox Church at the Knights of Honor Hall on Tremont Street in Boston. The church later evolved into the Saint George Albanian Orthodox Cathedral, today the seat of the Albanian Archdiocese of the Orthodox Church in America.

== Other sources ==
- Smith, Timothy L. (December 1978). "Religion and Ethnicity in America". The American Historical Review. 83 (5): 1155–1185. doi:10.2307/1854689. JSTOR 1854689.
