= Orthodox Christian Education Commission =

The Orthodox Christian Education Commission is an agency of SCOBA. It was founded in 1957 by a group of Orthodox theologians and educators as a forum where they could exchange ideas and search for solutions to common educational problems. It currently aims to develop and publish educational materials and offer support services to Orthodox churches in North America.

== Organization ==
The OCEC is governed by a board of trustees made up of jurisdictional representatives. Under the presidency of Metropolitan Philip (Saliba) of the Antiochian Orthodox Christian Archdiocese of North America, the commission seeks to encourage cooperation among member jurisdictions. The daily operations of the commission are conducted by an executive board, composed of a chairman (the vice president of the commission) and the various heads of the departments.It was founded in 1957 by a group of orthodox theologians and educators as a forum where they could exchange ideas and search for solution to common educational problems.
