= Irineu Duvlea =

Romanian Orthodox bishop

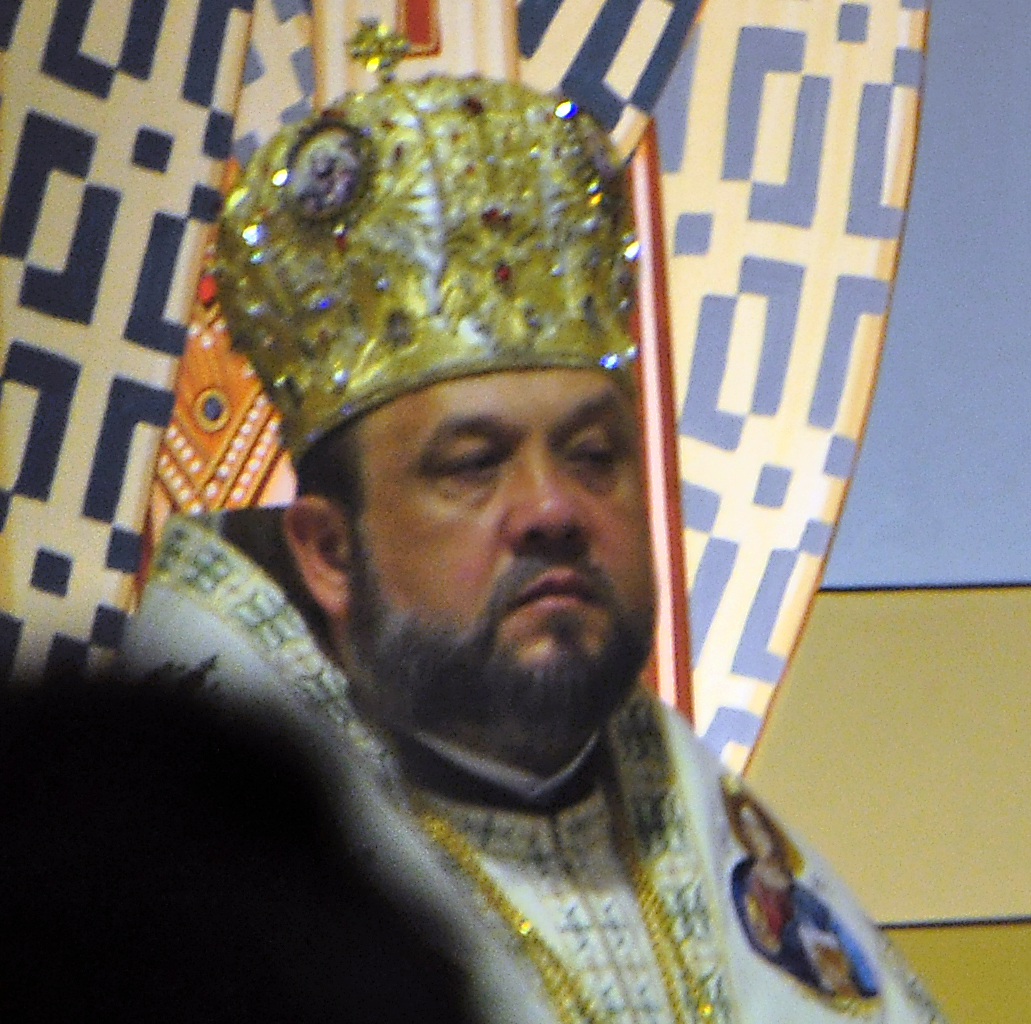

Irineu (Romanian pronunciation: [iriˈnew], secular name Ioan Duvlea, Romanian pronunciation: [iˈo̯an ˈduvle̯a]; born April 19, 1962) is a former bishop of the Orthodox Church of America, the Auxiliary Bishop of Dearborn Heights, vicar of the Romanian Orthodox Episcopate of America. He was consecrated on November 2, 2002. Since June 29, 2017 he is no longer part of the ROEA Diocese and the OCA.

== Background ==
Bishop Irineu was born on April 19, 1962, in Alba Iulia, Romania to Ion and Aurelia Duvlea, an Orthodox Christian family. His theological education includes the Theological Seminary in Cluj-Napoca (1981-1987), Theological Institute "Andrei Șaguna" in Sibiu (1987-1991), graduating with thesis: "Rules of organization and function of monasteries in the Romanian Orthodox Church."

Moved to enter the monastic life, he entered the Brâncoveanu Monastery at Sâmbătă de Sus, Brașov County, in 1980. On May 24, 1983, he was tonsured into monasticism by Bishop Lucian Florea of Făgăraș.

During his monastic life, Irnieu was ordained into the various ranks of Holy Orders. On May 3, 1983, he was ordained Hierodeacon by Archbishop John (Rinne) of Helsinki on behalf of Metropolitan Antonie Plămădeală of Transylvania, and, on November 17, 1984, ordained Hieromonk in the Metropolitan Cathedral of Sibiu by Metropolitan Antonie.

On August 15, 1988, he was blessed as Protosinghel by Antonie; on January 1, 1993, named Hegumen of the Brâncoveanu Monastery; in 1993 named Exarch of Monasteries in the Metropolia; on August 15, 1993, blessed as Archimandrite and Abbot of the monastery by Antonie on the occasion of the consecration of the monastery by Patriarch Bartholomew I of Constantinople, and Patriarch Teoctist of Romania, also at that time receiving the honor of the "Patriarchal Cross of Constantinople”; and on September 24, 2000, the Holy Synod of Romania bestowed upon him the rank of Mitred Archimandrite, a rare distinction in the Church of Romania.

During his time as Abbot of the Brâncoveanu Monastery, he performed his duties as Exarch of Monasteries in the Metropolia (encompassing most of Transylvania), which included the regular supervision and regulation of 15 monasteries and 10 sketes, and was delegated by Antonie to bless several monasteries and numerous monuments.

== America ==
Following an exchange of letters between Antonie and Nathaniel, Archbishop of Detroit and The Romanian Orthodox Episcopate of America, Archimandrite Irineu and a group of monks were given canonical release to come to America and establish The Ascension of the Lord Monastery under the omofor of Archbishop Nathaniel, with Archimandrite Irineu as Abbot, at the Saint Andrew House in Detroit, Michigan. Since their arrival on February 23, 2001, they worked to offer hospitality, comfort and spiritual care to not only the Romanian community but to the entire Orthodox population of Metropolitan Detroit and the Midwestern United States region.

Having been elected by the Congress of The Romanian Orthodox Episcopate of America (ROEA) in Special Session on June 28, 2002, the members of the Holy Synod of Bishops of The Orthodox Church in America, under the presidency of Metropolitan Herman, confirmed the election of the Archimandrite Irineu to the episcopacy during its special session as part of the All-American Council on July 24, 2002.

== Episcopacy ==
Bishop Irineu was consecrated to the episcopacy on November 2, 2002, at Saint George the Great-Martyr Romanian Orthodox Cathedral in Southfield/Detroit, Michigan. Presiding at the event was Archbishop Herman (Swaiko) of Washington and Metropolitan of All America and Canada, along with Nathaniel (Popp); Metropolitan Christopher (Kovacevich) (Serbian Patriarchate); Archbishops Kyrill (Yonchev) (OCA) and Nicolae (Condrea) (Romanian Patriarchate); Bishops Seraphim (Storheim) (OCA), Demetri (Khoury) (Antiochian Patriarchate) and Nikon (Liolin) (OCA).

Since his consecration, he has overseen activities as requested of him by Archbishop Nathaniel, traveling extensively throughout the country, especially visiting the numerous mission communities.

From June 19 to 23, 2017, the members of the Holy Synod of Bishops of the Orthodox Church in America, in a special session of the Synodal Court, canonically deposed the Bishop Irineu [Duvlea], from the status and all sacred functions of the episcopacy, removed him from the ranks of the clergy, and returned him to the status of a lay monk.

Eastern Orthodox Church titles
Preceded by Nathaniel (Popp)	Bishop of Dearborn Heights; 1984–2017	Succeeded by Vacant
