= Ecumenical Patriarchate in America =

The Ecumenical Patriarchate in America comprises nine separate jurisdictions, along with a number of stavropegial institutions, and includes roughly two-thirds of all Eastern Orthodox Christians in America. The archbishop of the Greek Orthodox Archdiocese of America, by far the largest of Constantinopolitan jurisdictions in the US, is considered the local primate and may convene a Holy Synod of all the hierarchs of the Ecumenical throne in America.

Reliable statistics are difficult to find, but the Ecumenical Patriarchate has roughly 500,000 adherents (or up to 2 million, by some estimates) in the United States worshiping at about 750 parishes (about 725) and monasteries (about 25). This includes 14 defined dioceses (a number of which overlap, since multiple jurisdictions exist), governed by 19 diocesan and auxiliary bishops. Thus Constantinople is by far the largest numerical representation of Eastern Orthodoxy in North America, including roughly twice as many Eastern Orthodox Christians under its omophorion than all other jurisdictions combined and about two-fifths of all Orthodox bishops in America.

== Jurisdictions ==
1. Albanian Orthodox Diocese of America
2. American Carpatho-Russian Orthodox Diocese
3. Greek Orthodox Archdiocese of Canada
4. Greek Orthodox Archdiocese of America
5. Greek Orthodox Metropolis of Mexico
6. Ukrainian Orthodox Church of Canada
7. Ukrainian Orthodox Church of the USA
8. Vicariate for Palestinian-Jordanian Communities in the USA
9. Vicariate for the Communities of Slavic Tradition in the USA

== Stavropegial institutions ==
The Patriarchal and Stavropegial Orthodox Monastery of St. Irene Chrysovalantou in Astoria, New York, founded in 1972, had historically been part of the Old Calendarist movement (specifically the "Kiousis Synod") but in 1998 it came under the omophorion of the Ecumenical Patriarch. Though not formally organized as a diocese, the monastery and its ten metochia—two monasteries and eight parishes—essentially function as a jurisdiction of the Ecumenical Patriarchate in the United States (also including one mission in Belize).

The abbot and the deputy abbot of the monastery are both bishops, governing not only the monastery but also the metochia, most of which are in the northeastern United States. Apart from a second monastery in Astoria, New York, and one in North Fort Myers, Florida, there are four parishes in New York, one in Delaware, one in Florida, one in Illinois, and one in Belize. (The list at the Greek Archdiocese website also includes a parish in New Jersey.) The current abbot is Metropolitan Paisios (Loulourgas) of Tyana, who led the monastery and its metochia into the Ecumenical Patriarchate along with the deputy abbot, Bishop Vikentios (Malamatenios) of Apameia. Both Paisios and Vikentios were ordained upon entry into the patriarchate, as their previous ordinations in the Old Calendarist movement were regarded as invalid.

The monastery and its metochia are stavropegial, directly under the Ecumenical Patriarch, and until recently continued to follow the Julian Calendar, but are using the Revised Julian Calendar for some years.

The Patriarch Athenagoras Orthodox Institute in Berkeley, California, is also a stavropegial institution of the patriarchate.
