= Greek Orthodox Church =

A Greek Orthodox Church (Greek: Ἑλληνορθόδοξη Ἐκκλησία, romanized: Ellinorthódoxi Ekklisía, IPA: [elinorˈθoðoksi ekliˈsia]) is any of three classes of Eastern Christian churches, each associated in some way with Greek Orthodoxy, Levantine Arab Christians (Antiochian), or more broadly, adhering to the Byzantine Rite, used in the lands of the former Eastern Roman Empire:

- The broader meaning refers to "the entire body of Orthodox (Chalcedonian) Christianity, sometimes also called 'Eastern Orthodox', 'Greek Catholic', or generally 'the Greek Church'".
- A second, narrower meaning refers to "any of several independent churches within the worldwide communion of Eastern Orthodox Christianity that retain the use of the Greek language in formal ecclesiastical settings". In this sense, the Greek Orthodox churches are the Ecumenical Patriarchate of Constantinople and its dependencies, the patriarchates of Alexandria, Antioch and Jerusalem, the Church of Greece and the Church of Cyprus.
- The third meaning refers to the Church of Greece, an Eastern Orthodox Church operating within the modern borders of Greece.

== Etymology ==
Historically, the term "Greek Orthodox" has been used to describe all Eastern Orthodox churches, since the term "Greek" can refer to the heritage of the Byzantine Empire. During the first eight centuries of Christian history, most major intellectual, cultural, and social developments in the Christian Church took place in the Byzantine Empire or its sphere of influence, where the Greek language was widely spoken and used for most theological writings. The empire's capital, Constantinople, was an early important center of Christianity, and its liturgical practices, traditions, and doctrines were gradually adopted throughout Eastern Orthodoxy, still providing the basic patterns of contemporary Orthodoxy. Thus, Eastern Orthodox came to be called "Greek" Orthodox in the same way that Western Christians came to be called "Roman" Catholic. However, the appellation "Greek" was abandoned by the Slavic and other Eastern Orthodox churches as part of their peoples' national awakenings, beginning as early as the 10th century A.D. Thus, by the early 21st century, generally only those churches most closely tied to Greek or Byzantine culture and ethnicity were called "Greek Orthodox" in common parlance.

Greek Orthodoxy has also been defined as a religious tradition rooted in preserving the Greek identity. In 2022, U.S. government estimated that 81–90% of the population of Greece identified as Greek Orthodox.

== History ==
The Greek Orthodox churches are descendants of churches which the Apostles founded in the Eastern Mediterranean during the first century A.D., as well as maintainers of many ancient church traditions.

== Churches ==
- The four ancient patriarchates:
  - The Ecumenical Patriarchate of Constantinople, headed by the Ecumenical Patriarch of Constantinople, who is also the "first among equals" of the Eastern Orthodox Church
    - The semi-autonomous Archdiocese of Crete
    - The Greek Orthodox Archdiocese of America
    - The Greek Orthodox Archdiocese of Australia
    - The Greek Orthodox Archdiocese of Canada
    - The Greek Orthodox Archdiocese of Italy
    - The Greek Orthodox Archdiocese of Thyateira and Great Britain
  - The Greek Orthodox Church of Alexandria
  - The Greek Orthodox Church of Antioch
    - The Antiochian Orthodox Archdiocese of Australia, New Zealand and the Philippines
    - The Antiochian Orthodox Archdiocese of Buenos Aires and All Argentina
    - The Antiochian Orthodox Archdiocese of France, Western and Southern Europe
    - The Antiochian Orthodox Archdiocese of Germany and Central Europe
    - The Antiochian Orthodox Archdiocese of Mexico, Venezuela, Central America and the Caribbean
    - The Antiochian Orthodox Archdiocese of North America
    - The Antiochian Orthodox Archdiocese of Santiago and All Chile
    - The Antiochian Orthodox Archdiocese of São Paulo and All Brazil
    - The Antiochian Orthodox Archdiocese of the British Isles and Ireland
  - The Greek Orthodox Church of Jerusalem
    - The autonomous Church of Sinai
- Autocephaly defended at the Council of Ephesus
  - The Church of Cyprus
- A modern autocephalous church:
  - The Church of Greece

== See also ==
- List of bishops and Ecumenical Patriarchs of Constantinople
- Old Calendarists
- History of the Eastern Orthodox Church
- Russian Orthodox Church
- Hayhurum
- Name days in Greece
- Greek East and Latin West
- Rum millet
- Romioi
- Rum (endonym)
- Melkite
