= Standing Conference of the Canonical Orthodox Bishops in the Americas =

Defunct organization of Eastern Orthodox bishops

The Standing Conference of the Canonical Orthodox Bishops in the Americas (SCOBA) was an organization of bishops from Eastern Orthodox Christian jurisdictions in the Americas. It acted as a clearinghouse for educational, charitable, and missionary work in the Americas. In 2010, it was replaced by the Assembly of Canonical Orthodox Bishops of North and Central America.

The members of SCOBA were the archbishops, metropolitan bishops, and bishops of the canonical Eastern Orthodox Churches in North and South America. These are churches in full communion with the four ancient Greek Orthodox Patriarchates – Ecumenical Patriarchate of Constantinople (Istanbul, Turkey), Patriarch of Antioch (now in Damascus, Syria), Greek Orthodox Patriarchate of Alexandria (Egypt), Greek Orthodox Patriarch of Jerusalem – and with the Patriarchate of Moscow.

== Jurisdictions ==
- Ecumenical Patriarchate
  - Greek Orthodox Archdiocese of America
  - Albanian Orthodox Diocese of America (not to be confused with the Albanian Orthodox Archdiocese in America, which is an archdiocese within the OCA)
  - American Carpatho-Russian Orthodox Diocese
  - Ukrainian Orthodox Church of the USA
  - Ukrainian Orthodox Church of Canada
- Antiochian Orthodox Archdiocese of North America
- Russian Orthodox Church in the USA (parishes directly under the Patriarch of Moscow)
- Serbian Orthodox Church in the USA and Canada
- Romanian Orthodox Archdiocese in America and Canada
- Bulgarian Orthodox Church Diocese of America, Canada & Australia
- Orthodox Church in America (the only autocephalous Orthodox church in North America, its autocephaly granted by the Patriarch of Moscow, is however not recognized by the Ecumenical Patriarchate of Constantinople, though still in communion with it)

== Agencies ==
The main agencies of SCOBA along with their dates of establishment are

- The Orthodox Christian Education Commission (OCEC), 1960
- The Eastern Orthodox Committee on Scouting (EOCS), 1960
- The Orthodox Christian Fellowship (OCF) 1965, 2001
- International Orthodox Christian Charities (IOCC), 1992
- The Orthodox Christian Mission Center (OCMC), 1994
- The Orthodox Christian Network (OCN), 2003

== See also ==
- Eastern Orthodoxy in North America
- Eastern Orthodox Church
- List of Eastern Orthodox jurisdictions in North America
- Archbishop of America
