= List of Eastern Orthodox bishops in the United States and Canada =

Eastern Orthodox bishops in the United States and Canada are bishops of various Eastern Orthodox Churches serving in the United States and Canada. The list includes all bishops serving in those countries, whether as diocesan bishops or in some other capacity, for example: as auxiliary bishops, diocesan administrators, or heads of various exarchates and vicariates. The dates following their names indicate the years during which they served in the United States or Canada.

This list includes all bishops by service, regardless of their nationality (citizenship).

== Church of Antioch ==
- Germanos (Shehadi) of Zahle

=== Antiochian Archdiocese ===
- Alexander (Mufarrij) of Ottawa, 2004–present
- Anthony (Michaels) of Toledo, 2011–present
- Antony (Bashir) of New York, 1935-1966
- Antoun (Khouri) of Miami, 1981-2017
- Basil (Essey) of Wichita, 1992–present
- Demetri (Khoury) of Jableh, 1995-2003 (retired)
- Joseph (Al-Zehlaoui) of Los Angeles, 1995–2022
- Mark (Maymon) of Toledo, 2004-2010
- Michael (Shaheen) of Toledo, 1958-1992
- Philip (Saliba) of New York, 1966-2014
- Samuel (David) of Toledo, 1935-1958
- Thomas (Joseph) of Oakland, 2004–present
- Victor (Abo-Assaley) of New York, 1924-1935

== Church of Russia, 1794-1924 ==
- Saint Tikhon (Belavin), Patriarch of Moscow, Apostle to America
- Vladimir (Sokolovsky-Avtonomov) of the Aleutians, 1888-1891
- Saint Innocent (Veniaminov) of Alaska, Equal to the Apostles and Enlightener of North America
- John (Mitropolsky) of the Aleutians, 1870-1877
- Nestor (Zass) of the Aleutians, 1878-1882
- Nicholas (Ziorov) of the Aleutians, 1891-1898
- Paul (Popov) of Novoarkhangelsk, 1867-1870
- Peter (Ekaterinovsky) of Novoarkhangelsk, 1859-1867
- Platon (Rozhdestvensky) of New York
- Saint Raphael (Hawaweeny) of Brooklyn, 1904-1915

=== Russian Exarchate of North America, 1933-1970 ===
- Benjamin (Fedchenkov) of the Aleutians, 1933-1947
- Makarius (Ilyinsky) of New York, 1947-1953
- Germogen, 1954
- Boris (Vik) of the Aleutians, 1955-1962
- John (Wendland) of New York and the Aleutians, 1962-1967
- Jonathan (Kopolovitch) of New York and the Aleutians, 1967-1970

=== Russian Orthodox Church Outside Russia (partial) ===
- Hilarion (Kapral), First Hierarch of the Russian Orthodox Church Outside of Russia and Metropolitan of Eastern America and New York, 2008–2022
- Kyrill (Dmitrieff), Archbishop of San Francisco and Western America, 2000–present
- Alypy (Gamanovich), Archbishop of Chicago and Mid-America
- Peter (Lukianoff) of Cleveland, Administrator of the Diocese of Chicago & Mid-America. Treasurer of the Synod of Bishops
- Theodosius (Ivashchenko), Bishop of Seattle, Vicar Bishop of the Diocese of San Francisco and Western America, 2008–present
- George (Schaefer) of Mayfield, Vicar Bishop of the Diocese of Eastern America and New York
- Jerome (Shaw) of Manhattan, Vicar Bishop of the Diocese of Eastern America and New York, Deputy Secretary of the Synod of Bishops
- Philaret (Voznesensky) Metropolitan
- Vitaly (Ustinov) First Hierarch of the Russian Orthodox Church Outside Russia and Metropolitan of Eastern America and New York, 1986 - 2001
- Laurus (Škurla), First Hierarch of the Russian Orthodox Church Outside Russia and Metropolitan of Eastern America and New York, 2001 - 2008
- Saint John of Shanghai and San Francisco

== Greek Orthodox Archdiocese of America ==
- Anthimos (Drakonakis) of Olympus, Bishop of Christoupolis Sixth District (Pittsburg) 1977–1979, Bishop of Boston 1979-1983, Bishop of Denver 1984-1987, later assigned to Bishop of Olympus 1992-2015
- Alexander (Demoglou) of America, 1922-1930
- Alexios (Panagiotopoulos) of Atlanta, 1999–present
- Andonios (Paropoulos) of Phasiane, - present
- Anthony (Gergiannakis) of San Francisco, 1978-2004
- Apostolos (Koufallakis) of New Jersey, 2023–present
- Athenagoras (Spyrou) of America, 1931-1949
- Demetrios (Kantzavelos) of Mokissos, -present
- Demetrios (Trakatellis) of America, 1999-2019
- Dimitrios (Couchell) of Xanthos, 1998-2026
- Evangelos (Kourounis) of New Jersey, 2003 - 2020
- George (Papaioannou) of New Jersey, 1998-1999
- Gerasimos (Michaleas) of San Francisco, 2005–present
- Iakovos (Coucouzis) of America, 1959-1996
- Iakovos (Garmatis) of Chicago, 1979–2017
- Isaiah (Chronopoulos) of Denver, 1992–present
- Maximos (Aghiorgoussis) of Pittsburgh, 1979-2011
- Methodios (Tournas) of Boston, 1983–present
- Michael (Konstantinides) of America, 1949-1959
- Nathanael (Symeonides) of Chicago, 2018–present
- Nicholas (Pissare) of Detroit, 1999–present
- Philip (Koutoufas) of Atlanta, 1992-1996
- Savas (Zembillas) of Troas, 2002–present
- Spyridon (Papageorge) of America, 1996-1999
- Timothy (Negropontis) of Detroit, 1979-1995

== Northern American Metropolia/Orthodox Church in America ==
- Platon (Rozhdestvensky) Archbishop of the Aleutians and North America (1907-1914). Later named Metropolitan of All America and Canada (1922-1934)
- Evdokim (Meschersky) Archbishop of the Aleutians and North America (1914-1918)
- Alexander (Nemolovsky) Archbishop of the Aleutians and North America (1919-1922)
- Theophilus (Pashkovsky) Archbishop of San Francisco, Metropolitan of All America and Canada (1934-1950)
- Leontius (Turkevich) Archbishop of New York, Metropolitan of All America and Canada (1950-1965)
- John (Shakhovskoy) Archbishop of San Francisco and the West (1950-1974)
- Irenaeus (Bekish) Archbishop of New York, Metropolitan of All America and Canada (1965-1977)
- Theodosius (Lazor) Archbishop of Washington, Metropolitan of All America and Canada (1977-2002)
- Herman (Swaiko) Archbishop of Washington and New York, Metropolitan of All America and Canada (2002-2008)
- Jonah (Paffhausen) Archbishop of Washington, Metropolitan of All America and Canada (2008-2012)
- Tikhon (Mollard) Archbishop of Washington, Metropolitan of All America and Canada (since 2012)

=== Holy Synod of Bishops (2024) ===
- Tikhon (Mollard), Archbishop of Washington and Metropolitan of All America and Canada
- Nathaniel (Popp), Archbishop of Detroit and the Romanian Episcopate
- Benjamin (Peterson), Archbishop of San Francisco and the West
- Mark (Maymon), Archbishop of Philadelphia and Eastern Pennsylvania
- Alejo (Pacheco y Vera), Archbishop of Mexico City and Mexico
- Melchisedek (Pleska), Archbishop of Pittsburgh and Western Pennsylvania
- Irénée (Rochon), Archbishop of Ottawa and the Archdiocese of Canada
- Michael (Dahulich), Archbishop of New York and New Jersey
- Alexander (Golitzin), Archbishop of Dallas, the South and the Bulgarian Diocese
- Daniel (Brum), Archbishop of Chicago and the Midwest
- Alexei (Trader), Bishop of Sitka and Alaska
- Nikodhim (Preston) Bishop of Boston, New England, and the Albanian Archdiocese
- Benedict (Churchill) Bishop of Hartford and New England
- Andrei (Hoarşte), Bishop of Cleveland and Auxiliary to the Romanian Orthodox Episcopate of America
- Gerasim (Eliel), Bishop of Fort Worth and Auxiliary to the Diocese of the South

== Sources ==
- Derived, in part, with permission from List of American bishops at OrthodoxWiki.
- Hierarchs of the Greek Orthodox Church, Orthodox Research Institute.
- , Orthodox Church in America (OCA Website).
