= Justinian Ovchinnikov =

Russian archbishop

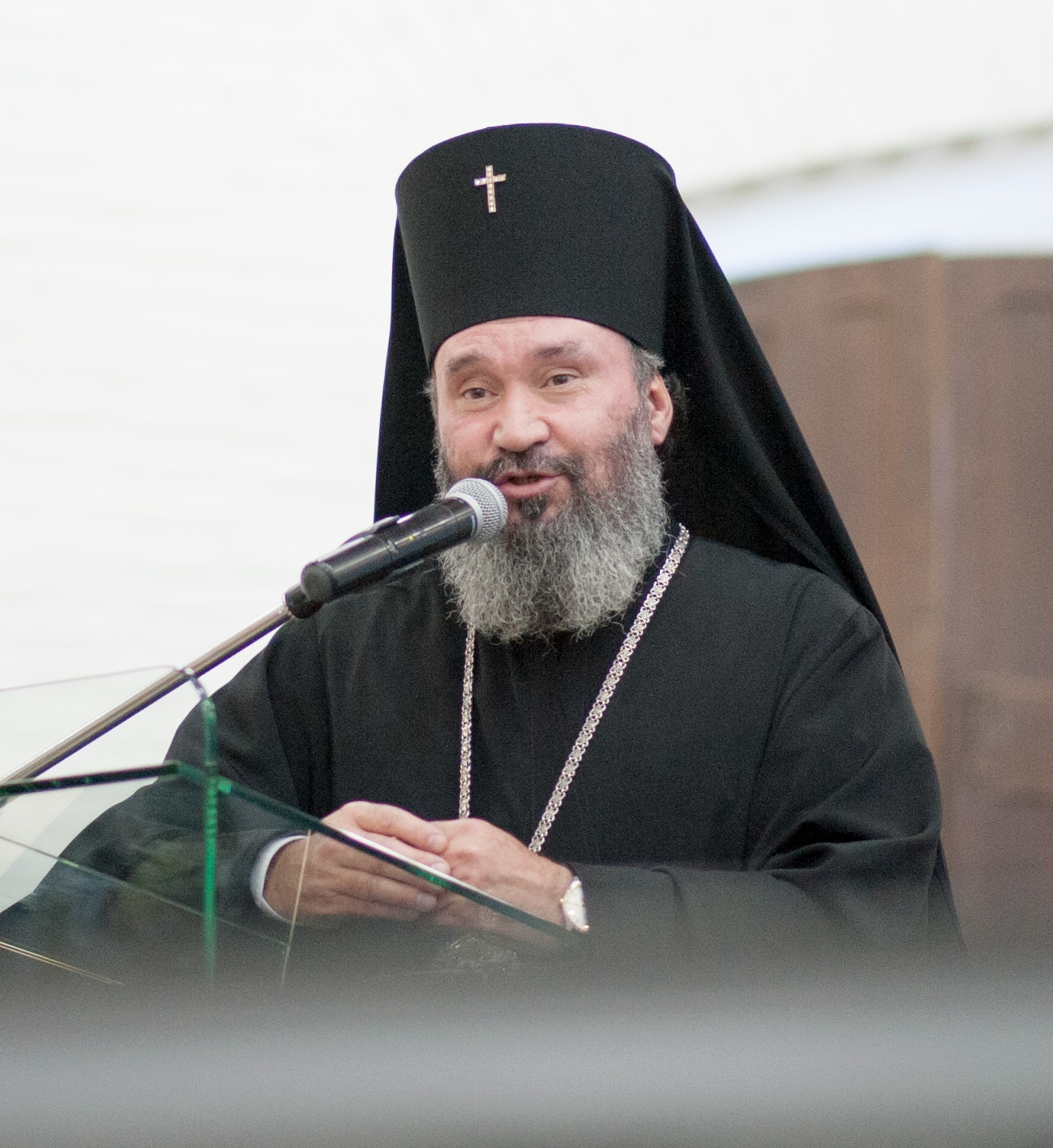
Ovchinnikov in September 2015

Justinian Ovchinnikov (Russian: Юстиниан Овчинников; born Victor Ivanovich Ovchinnikov, 28 January 1961 in Kosteryovo, Vladimir Oblast) is a high-ranking member of the Russian Orthodox Church. He held the title of archbishop of the patriarchal parishes in the United States from March 2010 to 2014.

Prior to this appointment, he was head of the Diocese of Tiraspol, in Transnistria (Moldova) and its mother church, the Christmas Church from 1998 to 2010.
