= Demetri Khoury =

American bishop

His Grace, the Right Reverend Demetri (Khoury)
- Bishop of Jableh (titular)
- Church: Greek Orthodox Church of Antioch
- Archdiocese: Antiochian Orthodox Christian Archdiocese of North America
- See: Jableh
- Installed: 1995-03-12
- Retired: 2003

Personal details
- Born: Matta Khoury; 1948-09-20 (age 78) Taybeh
- Education: BA in Philosophy and Religion, 1974 Hellenic College; MDiv, 1978 Holy Cross Greek Orthodox School of Theology

Ordination history
History
Episcopal consecration
- Consecrated by: Ignatius IV of Antioch

Demetri (born Matta Khoury), titular Bishop of Jableh, was an auxiliary bishop of the Antiochian Orthodox Christian Archdiocese of North America from 1995 to 2003.

== Career ==
Born in Taybeh on 20 September 1948 to the Very Rev. Ibrahim and Hanneh Khoury, he was educated at the St. John of Damascus Orthodox Theological Academy. He received a Bachelor of Arts degree in Philosophy and Religion in 1974 and a Master of Divinity degree in 1978, both from Hellenic College Holy Cross Greek Orthodox School of Theology. Ordained as a deacon on 6 September 1975 and to the priesthood on 7 September 1975, he was elevated to the dignity of archimandrite by Metropolitan Philip in 1981.

He served as pastor at St. George, Boston, and at St. Mary, Cambridge. After serving at St. George, Allentown, Pennsylvania, he then served as dean at St. Nicholas Cathedral, Brooklyn, New York, and at St. George Cathedral, Coral Gables, Florida. On 12 March 1995, he was consecrated as titular bishop of Jableh by Patriarch Ignatius IV of Antioch at the Mariamite Cathedral of Damascus. He served as an auxiliary bishop in the Antiochian Orthodox Christian Archdiocese of North America at the chancery in Toledo, Ohio until 2003. In 2004, he was arrested following a sexual assault in a casino and was sentenced to 28 days in jail as well as being placed on the sex offender registry.

As of 2008, he was serving as an auxiliary bishop of the Antiochian Orthodox Archdiocese of Mexico, Venezuela, Central America and the Caribbean (Note: "Visita de su Exelencia Obispo Demetri Khoury" [Visit of His Excellency Bishop Demetri Khoury]. Antiochian Orthodox Archdiocese of Mexico, Venezuela, Central America and the Caribbean (in Spanish). 2008-12-03.) but retired again in 2009.

== Books ==
- ———— (2008-07-11). A Cloud of Witnesses: Saints and Martyrs From the Holy Land. Bloomington, Indiana: AuthorHouse. ISBN 978-1-4343-9440-8. LCCN 2008905429. OCLC 300980363. OL 23013532M.
- Morris, John, ed. (March 2011). The Book of the Typikon: Containing all the Rubrics and Ordinances of the various Divine Services of the Holy Orthodox Church (PDF). Translated by ————. Miami. Archived (PDF) from the original on 2022-02-20.
- ————, ed. (2012-08-01). Prophetelogion (PDF). Rives Junction, Michigan: Holy Dormition Monastery. Archived (PDF) from the original on 2022-02-20.
