= Albanian Orthodox Diocese of America =

Albanian Orthodox Diocese of America Dioqeza ortodokse shqiptare në Amerikë
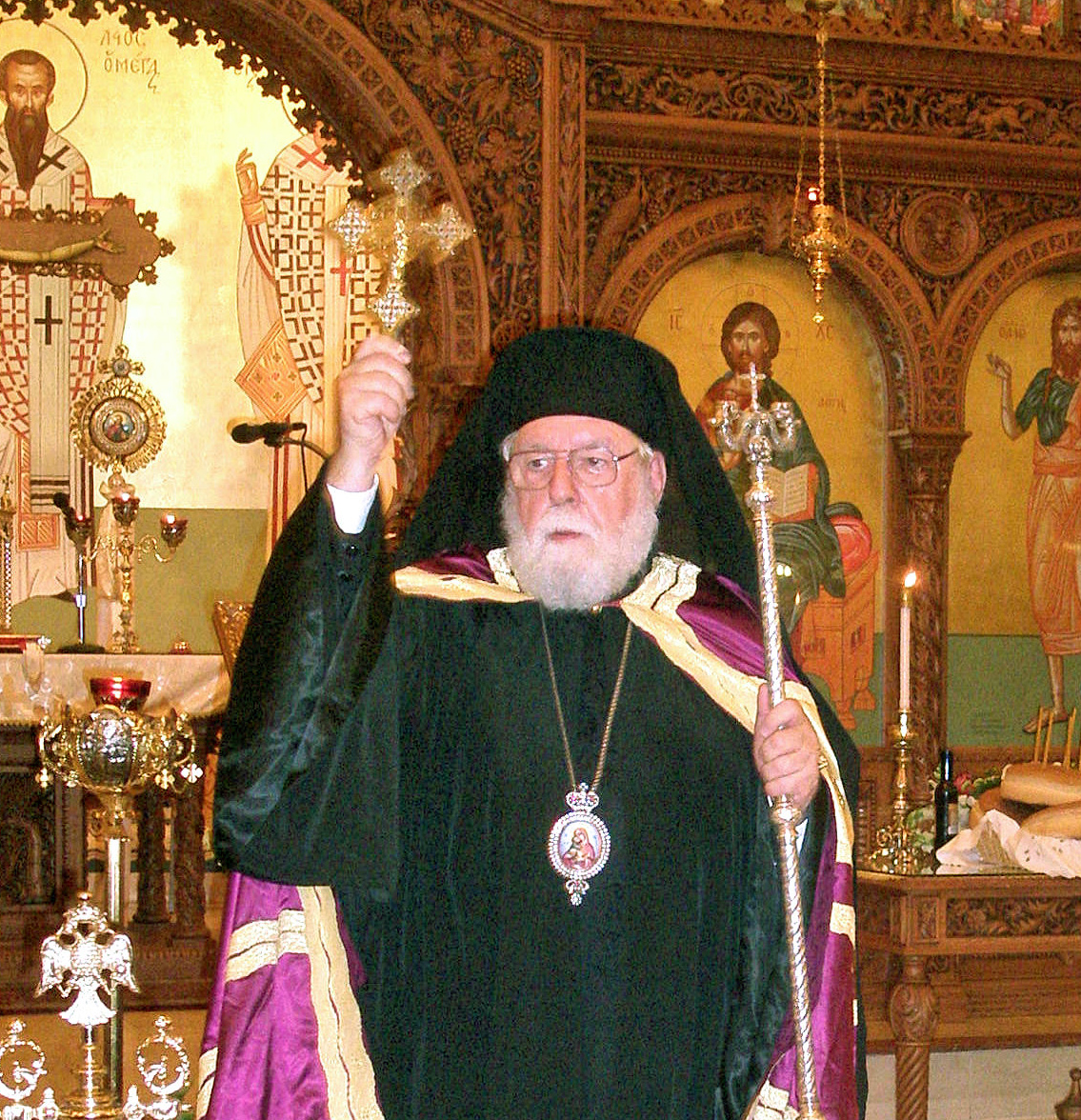
- Bishop Ilia (Katre), in 2008.

Location
- Territory: United States, Canada
- Headquarters: Las Vegas, Nevada

Statistics
- Churches: 2 (2020)
- Members: 800 (2020)

Information
- Denomination: Eastern Orthodox
- Sui iuris church: Ecumenical Patriarchate
- Rite: Byzantine
- Established: 1949; Boston, USA by Athenagoras (Spyrou)
- Language: Albanian, English
- Music: Byzantine chant

Website
- Albanian Orthodox Diocese in America, at the website of the GOA

The Albanian Orthodox Diocese of America (Albanian: Dioqeza ortodokse shqiptare në Amerikë) is a jurisdiction of the Ecumenical Patriarchate in the United States. As of 2020, there are 2 parishes, 800 adherents, and 160 regular attendees.

== History ==
In the first half of the 20th century, the Orthodox Albanian communities in America were loosely affiliated with one another, with six of fifteen communities claiming "independent" status and the others not incorporated as dioceses until after the Second World War. The earliest organized Albanian dioceses were set up under the auspices of the Russian Orthodox Greek Catholic Church (now Orthodox Church in America), because the Church of Constantinople would not allow the rise of any Albanian Orthodox Church and officially opposed the use of the Albanian language in churches until 1937 when the Autocephalic Orthodox Church of Albania was recognized by Constantinople. These early Albanian dioceses in America were led by Fan S. Noli, and in 1908 a translation of the liturgy into Albanian was made. After political dislocations following the October Revolution of 1917 in Russia, all ties with the Russian Orthodox church were severed, and the Albanian churches under Noli became independent. In the 1920s Noli was exiled to Germany, returning in 1932. His return reopened the discussion of the need for a canonical Albanian diocese in North America; Noli had been consecrated in 1922 as Bishop of Durrës by the Church of Albania, which did not claim any jurisdiction in North America, so he could not gain recognition as head of a diocese in the Americas.

=== Dioceses ===
With the controversy around Bp. Theofan's status, the end of World War II, and the increasing suppression and manipulation of the Albanian Orthodox Church by the new Communist government, a significant portion of Orthodox Albanian-Americans petitioned the patriarch of Constantinople, Athenagoras, to send a canonical bishop. Mark (Lipa) organized the diocese in 1950 and accepted into it the large community in Chicago and an older parish, the first of three Albanian Orthodox parishes to locate in South Boston.

Ten other Albanian Orthodox parishes incorporated under Bp. Theofan's archdiocese and two parishes persisted in an "independent" status.

In 1965 at the passing of Bp. Theofan, without an archdiocesan nomination and under the cloud of Communist influence, the Albanian Orthodox Church consecrated his successor, Bp. Stephen (Lasko), who was not accepted throughout the archdiocese and who likewise could not gain canonical recognition by the other Orthodox jurisdictions in North America. The situation was further irritated by the complete public suppression of all religious communities in Albania, with only the most stalwart Orthodox believers maintaining a clandestine liturgical life.

Bp. Mark and the Albanian Orthodox Diocese of America reasserted their status as the lone canonical Albanian Orthodox jurisdiction in the Americas. By October 1971, with the acceptance of Bp. Stephen and the Albanian Orthodox Archdiocese in America as a constituent diocese of the OCA, the canonical controversy was ended.

=== Legacy ===
The Albanian Orthodox Diocese of America played a crucial role in the resurrection of the Albanian Orthodox Church. In 1990, the Diocesan clergy and laity petitioned the ecumenical patriarch, Demetrios, during his visit to North America, to prepare a plan for the restoration of the Albanian Orthodox Church. In 1991, the (then) protopresbyter Ilia Katre, who had served for many years as dean of students at Holy Cross Greek Orthodox School of Theology in Brookline, Massachusetts, took up residence in Albania, organized and opened the Resurrection of Christ Seminary with the blessing of the newly arrived patriarchal exarch, Anastasios. Ilia also directed the enthronement of Anastasios as Archbishop of All Albania in August 1992. Individuals and delegations from the diocese made major financial contributions to the Albanian Orthodox Church as well as applied pressure on the government for the return of confiscated property to the Church. In 2002 Bishop Ilia returned to lead the seminary for three years, during which he expanded, strengthened, and lengthened the course to a full four-year programme.

The diocese has made outreach to new communities in Toronto, Montreal, Washington, and Baltimore.

== Bishops ==
- Mark (Lipa) (September 10, 1950 - March 11, 1982)
- Ilia (Katre) (May 10, 2002 - October 7, 2022)
- Theophan (Koja) (since July 25, 2023)

== Sources ==
This article incorporates text from Albanian Orthodox Diocese of America at OrthodoxWiki which is licensed under the CC-BY-SA and GFDL.

== See also ==
- Orthodox Autocephalous Church of Albania
- Orthodox Church in America Albanian Archdiocese
- Assembly of Canonical Orthodox Bishops of the United States of America
- Assembly of Canonical Orthodox Bishops of Canada
