= Orthodox Church in America Archdiocese of Canada =

Diocese of the Orthodox Church in America

Archdiocese of Canada (Orthodox Church in America)

Orthodox
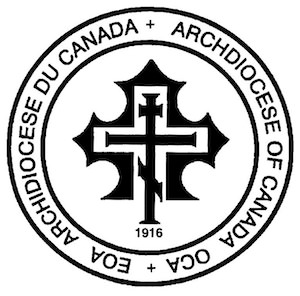

Location
- Territory: Canada
- Metropolitan: Tikhon (Mollard)

Statistics
- Parishes: 61 active (95 total), 6 monasteries

Information
- Denomination: Eastern Orthodox
- Rite: Byzantine Rite
- Established: 1903
- Secular priests: 1 bishop, 71 clergy (61 active priests), 32 deacons and 30 monastics

Current leadership
- Parent church: Orthodox Church in America
- Governance: Episcopal
- Archbishop: Irénée (Rochon)

Map
- The provinces in which the Archdiocese of Canada has jurisdiction.

Website
- www.archdiocese.ca

The Archdiocese of Canada is a diocese of the Orthodox Church in America (OCA). Its territory includes parishes, monasteries, and missions located in nine provinces and territories in Canada—Alberta, British Columbia, Manitoba, Newfoundland and Labrador, Nova Scotia, Ontario, Quebec, Saskatchewan, and Yukon. The diocesan center is located in Rawdon, Quebec.

The Archdiocese of Canada is the descendant in Canada of the Orthodox mission of the Russian Empire in North America. The diocese was founded and incorporated by Saint Tikhon, then Orthodox Bishop for all North America (later Patriarch of Moscow and all Rus), in 1903.

Seraphim (Storheim) was consecrated auxiliary bishop of Edmonton in 1987, and became ruling bishop of the archdiocese of Canada in 1990. He was elevated to Archbishop during the Spring Holy Synod meeting in March 2007.

On April 2, 2009, the Holy Synod of the Orthodox Church in America, elevated Higoumène Irénée (Rochon) to the rank of Archimandrite, and elected him to be Auxiliary Bishop for Archbishop Seraphim of Ottawa and Canada, with the title of Bishop of Québec City. On October 21, 2014, the Holy Synod of Bishops of the Orthodox Church in America elected Bishop Irénée as Bishop of Ottawa and the Archdiocese of Canada. On March 20, 2015, during the Spring Session of the Holy Synod of Bishops of the Orthodox Church in America, Bishop Irénée was elevated to the rank of Archbishop of Ottawa and the Archdiocese of Canada.

== History ==
The history of the Archdiocese of Canada of the Orthodox Church in America is closely connected with the development of Orthodox Christianity in North America and the Russian Orthodox missionary presence on the continent. The origins of the Orthodox Church in North America date to 1794, when missionaries from Valaam Monastery arrived in Alaska and established the first Orthodox mission. As Orthodox communities expanded beyond Alaska, the missionary territory gradually developed into the Russian Orthodox ecclesiastical structure in North America.

By the end of the 19th century, Orthodox communities began to appear in Canada as a result of immigration from Eastern Europe, particularly from regions of the Austro-Hungarian Empire and the Russian Empire. The earliest Orthodox parishes in Canada were established to serve immigrants of various ethnic backgrounds, including Ukrainians, Carpatho-Rusyns, Russians, and other Orthodox Christians. These communities initially remained under the pastoral administration of the Russian Orthodox mission in North America.

In 1903, during the episcopacy of Saint Tikhon (Bellavin), Bishop of the Diocese of the Aleutians and North America, the Orthodox communities in Canada received a more organized ecclesiastical structure. The Bishop of the Russo-Greek Catholic Orthodox Church and the parishes and missions of the Church in Canada were incorporated through legislation in the North-West Territories, providing a legal foundation for the administration of Orthodox Church property and institutions.

In the early decades of the 20th century, the Orthodox Church in Canada continued to expand. New parishes were established in the Prairie provinces, Ontario, and other parts of the country as Orthodox immigrants settled throughout Canada. In 1916, a Canadian auxiliary episcopal see was established within the Diocese of the Aleutians and North America, and Alexander (Nemolovsky) was appointed as the first bishop associated with the Canadian territory.

Following the Russian Revolution of 1917, the Orthodox Church in North America experienced significant changes in its administrative structure. The separation of the North American church from direct administration by the Moscow Patriarchate led to the development of the Russian Orthodox Greek Catholic Church of America, commonly known as the Metropolia. The Canadian parishes continued within this ecclesiastical body and developed their own local identity while maintaining their connection with the wider Orthodox Church in North America.

In 1940, the Canadian territory was organized as a separate diocese within the Russian Orthodox Greek Catholic Church of North America (the Metropolia). The diocese continued to develop during the post-war period, with new parishes, missions, and monastic communities being established throughout Canada. In 1954, the Diocese of Canada was elevated to the rank of an archdiocese.

In 1970, the Russian Orthodox Church granted autocephaly to the Metropolia, which became the Orthodox Church in America (OCA). The Tomos of Autocephaly established the OCA as an independent and self-governing Orthodox Church, and the Archdiocese of Canada became one of its dioceses. Since that time, the archdiocese has continued to serve Orthodox Christians throughout Canada through its parishes, monasteries, and missionary communities.

== Deaneries ==
The diocese is grouped geographically into five deaneries, each consisting of a number of parishes. Each deanery is headed by a parish priest, known as a dean. The deans coordinate activities in their area's parishes, and report to the diocesan bishop. As of 2018 the deaneries of the Archdiocese of Canada were:

- Alberta and Northwest Territories Deanery
- British Columbia and Yukon Deanery
- Manitoba, Saskatchewan and Nunavut Deanery
- Ontario Deanery
- Quebec & Atlantic Provinces Deanery

== Episcopacy ==
- Alexander (Nemolovsky) – 1916–1919
- Apollinary (Koshevoy) – 1924–1925
- Arseny (Chavtsov) – 1926–1927
- Emmanuel (Abo-Hatab) – 1927–1933
- Jeronim (Chernov) – 1936–1937
- Joasaph (Skorodumov) – 1938–1946
- Anthony (Tereschenko) – 1947
  - Leonty (Turkevich) – locum tenens 1951–1952
- Nikon (de Greve) – 1952–1958
  - Leonty (Turkevich) – locum tenens 1958–1960
- Anatoly (Apostlov) – 1961–1962
- Sylvester (Haruns) – 1963–1981
  - Theodosius (Lazor) – locum tenens 1981–1990
- Seraphim (Storheim) – 1990–2011
- Irénée (Rochon) – 2011–present

== See also ==
- Assembly of Canonical Orthodox Bishops of Canada

== Bibliography ==
- Efimov, A. B.; Lasaeva, O. V. (2011). "The Formation of Orthodoxy in Canada at the Turn of the 19th–20th Centuries". Vestnik PSTGU. Series II: History. History of the Russian Orthodox Church (4 (41)): 60–75.
