= Russian Orthodox Patriarchal Parishes in Canada =

- Abbreviation: PPC
- Formation: 1890
- Type: religious organization in Canada
- Legal status: active
- Purpose: advocate and public voice, educator and network
- Headquarters: Edmonton, Alberta
- Region served: Canada
- Official language: English; French
- Parent organization: Moscow Patriarchate
- Website: Official Website

The Patriarchal Parishes of the Russian Orthodox Church in Canada is a canonical unit of the Moscow Patriarchate in Canada. The headquarters of the church is in Edmonton; home to St. Barbara Cathedral. From Edmonton, two traveling priests serve a number of rural churches in Alberta, Saskatchewan, and Manitoba. Other parishes are located in Toronto and Ottawa.

== History ==
Orthodox believers first came to Canada in large numbers from the Austro-Hungarian province of Bukovina in the 1890s, and they settled mostly in the prairie provinces. Most self-identified as Ruthenians or Ukrainians but some were Russophiles; all of them were without any Orthodox priests. The Russian Church had prior claim to all of North America because of its missionary activity in Alaska and California. The first Orthodox service in Canada was held in 1897 by the Reverend Dimitri Kamnev and Deacon Vladimir Alexandrov. They had been dispatched by Bishop Nicholas of the Russian Orthodox Church Mission in San Francisco, USA to the tiny settlement of Wostok near Edmonton.

After the Russian Revolution, many Orthodox believers in Western Canada defected to the Ukrainian Greek Catholic Church or the new Ukrainian Greek Orthodox Church of Canada. Those Orthodox churches in Canada that stayed with the Moscow Patriarchate, primarily in Alberta, combined with later churches built in Eastern Canada, formed the basis for what is now known as the Patriarchal Parishes of Russian Orthodox Church in Canada.

== Cathedral ==
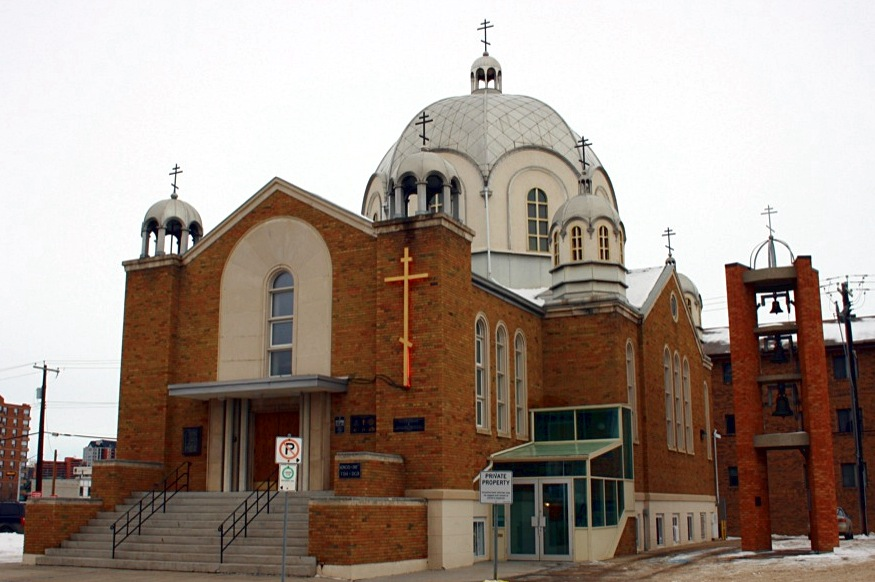

St. Barbara Church in Edmonton was founded in 1902. The original building, sitting on the same site as the present on top of Grierson Hill, was a converted two-story residence. It was replaced by a wooden church that was used until 1958. The third and present building was opened officially opened August 8, 1959, and was consecrated as a cathedral. In 2010, the iconostas was replaced with icons from Russia attached to a screen carved by a parishioner who is also a master woodworker.

== See also ==
- Assembly of Canonical Orthodox Bishops of Canada
