= Romanian Orthodox Metropolia of the Americas =

Orthodox church in North America

Romanian Orthodox Metropolia of the Americas Mitropolia Ortodoxă Română A Celor Două Americi
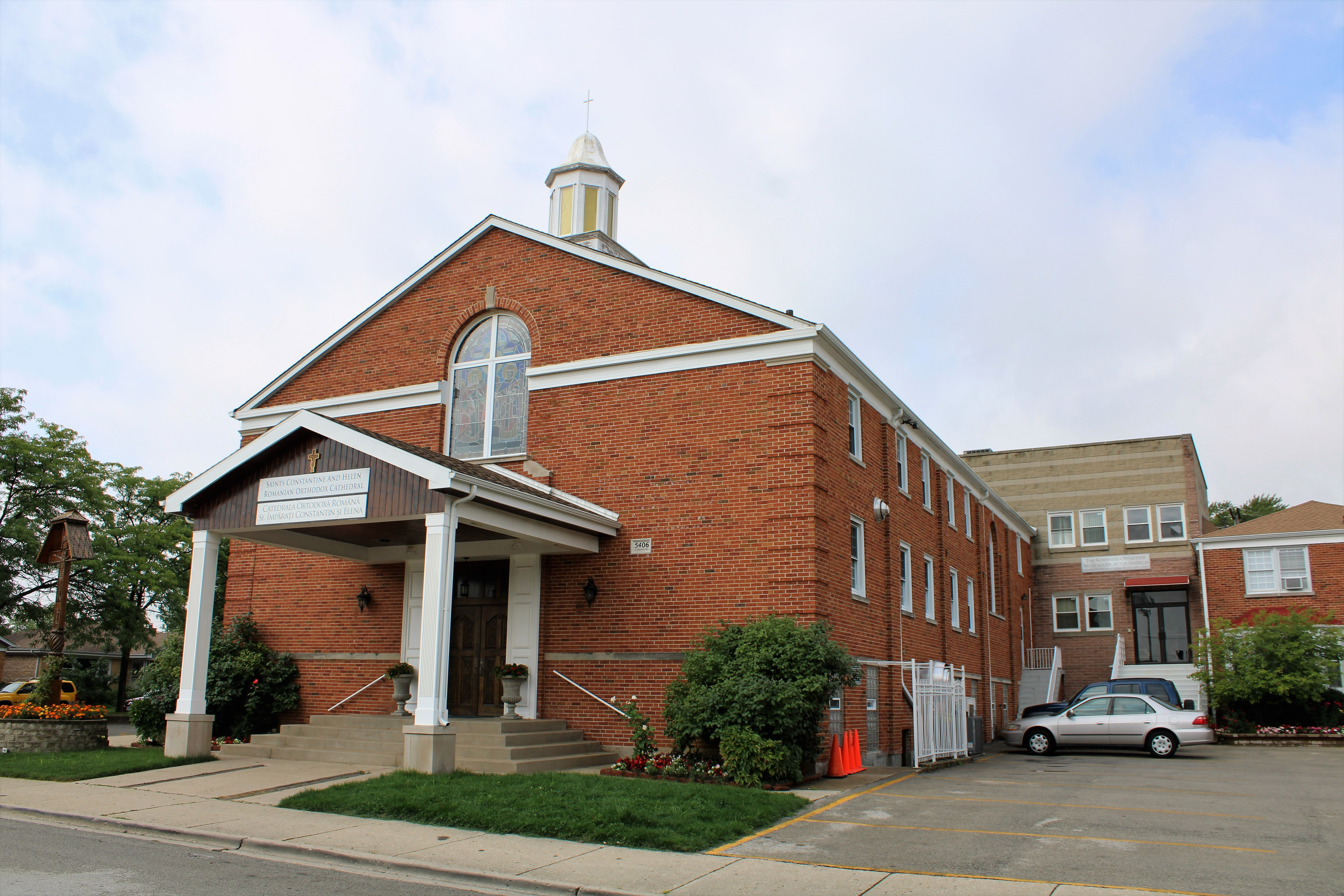
- Saints Constantine and Helen Romanian Orthodox Cathedral in Chicago, Illinois
- Type: Eastern Orthodox
- Structure: Metropolis
- Patriarch of All Romania: Daniel
- Metropolitan: Nicolae (Condrea)
- Language: Romanian, English
- Territory: United States; Canada
- Recognition: Orthodox

The Romanian Orthodox Metropolia of the Americas or simply Metropolia (Romanian: Mitropolia Ortodoxă Română a celor două Americi or simply Mitropolia) is an autonomous Eastern Orthodox metropolis of the Romanian Orthodox Church. The Metropolia covers the territory of the United States and Canada. As of 2020 it had 1 monastery and 32 parishes with 6,439 adherents, but 2,258 regular attendees in the United States.

The Metropolia is led by Nicolae, Archbishop of the Romanian Orthodox Archdiocese of the United States of America and The Romanian Orthodox Metropolitan of the Americas, with the metropolitan center located in Chicago, Illinois.

== Administration and structure ==
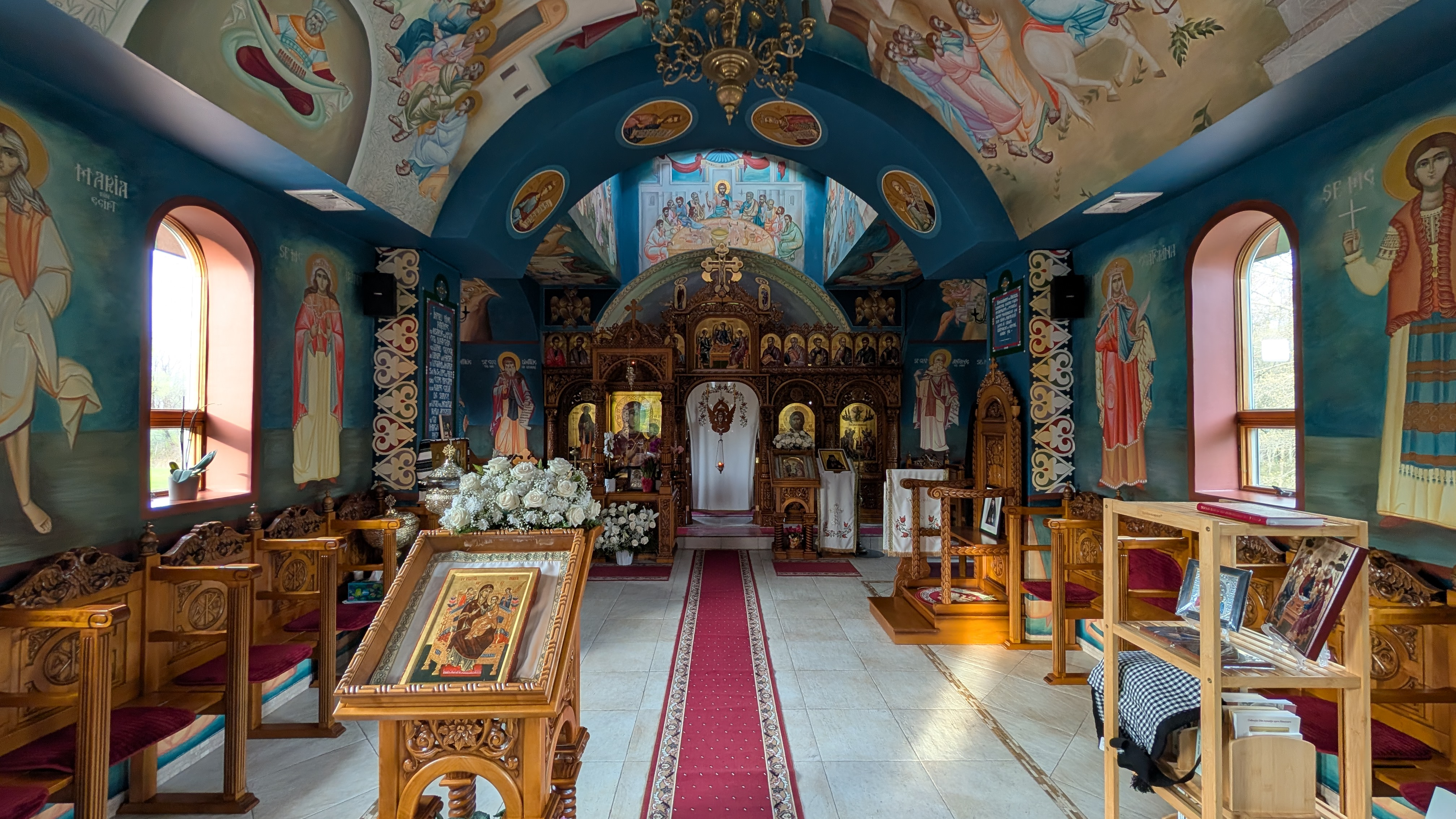
Interior of St Dumitru Romanian Orthodox Monastery in Middletown, NY

The church is divided into one archdiocese and one diocese, each organized into three geographical deaneries, around which the parishes are grouped.

=== Archdioceses and Archbishops ===
- Romanian Orthodox Archdiocese of the United States of America: Nicolae
  - Eastern USA Deanery
  - Central USA Deanery
  - Western USA Deanery

=== Dioceses and Bishops ===
- Romanian Orthodox Diocese of Canada: Ioan Casian de Vicina
  - Eastern Canada Deanery
  - Central Canada Deanery
  - Western Canada Deanery

== See also ==
- List of members of the Holy Synod of the Romanian Orthodox Church
- Assembly of Canonical Orthodox Bishops of the United States of America
- Assembly of Canonical Orthodox Bishops of Canada
- Assembly of Canonical Orthodox Bishops of Latin America
