= Antiochian Orthodox Archdiocese of Mexico, Venezuela, Central America and the Caribbean =

Jurisdiction of the Greek Orthodox Church of Antioch

- Primate: Metropolitan Ignacio (Samaán)
- Official website: iglesiaortodoxa.org.mx

The Antiochian Orthodox Archdiocese of Mexico, Venezuela, Central America and the Caribbean (Spanish: Arquidiócesis Ortodoxa Antioquena de México, Venezuela, Centroamérica y El Caribe; Arabic: أبرشية المكسيك، فنزويلا، أمريكا الوسطى وجزر الكاريبي للأرثوذكس الأنطاكيين ʼamabrashiyya almaksīk, finizwaylā, ʼamīrkā alwūsṭā wajazr alkārībī lilʼurthūdhuks alʼanṭākīyin) is a jurisdiction of the Greek Orthodox Church of Antioch. Its current Metropolitan is Ignacio (Samaán).

The Antiochian Orthodox Church is administered by Patriarch John X of Antioch in Damascus, Syria.

The Greek Orthodox Patriarchate of Antioch operates several archdioceses throughout the world, one of which is the Antiochian Archdiocese of Mexico, Venezuela, Central America, and the Caribbean.

In charge of the archdiocese is Archbishop Ignacio at the Saint George Cathedral in Mexico City, Mexico.

== Parish list ==
The Antiochian Orthodox Christian Archdiocese of Mexico has parishes in the following countries:

- Mexico
  - Mexico City - Saint George Cathedral
  - Huixquilucan- Saint Peter and Saint Paul Cathedral
  - Mérida - Dormition of the Theotokos
  - Jilotepec de Abasolo - Saint Anthony the Great Monastery
  - Tijuana - Project Mexico / Saint Innocent Orphanage
- Venezuela
  - Caracas
  - Valencia
- Puerto Rico
- Guatemala
- Colombia
  - Orthodox Mission "Casa de la misericordia"

== See also ==
- Antiochian Orthodox Archdiocese of Buenos Aires and All Argentina
- Antiochian Orthodox Archdiocese of Santiago and All Chile
- Antiochian Orthodox Archdiocese of São Paulo and All Brazil
- Assembly of Canonical Orthodox Bishops of Latin America
