= Antiochian Orthodox Archdiocese of Santiago and All Chile =

Chilean Greek Orthodox Christian church

- Primate: Metropolitan Sergio Abad
- Territory: Chile
- Official website: www.chileortodoxo.cl

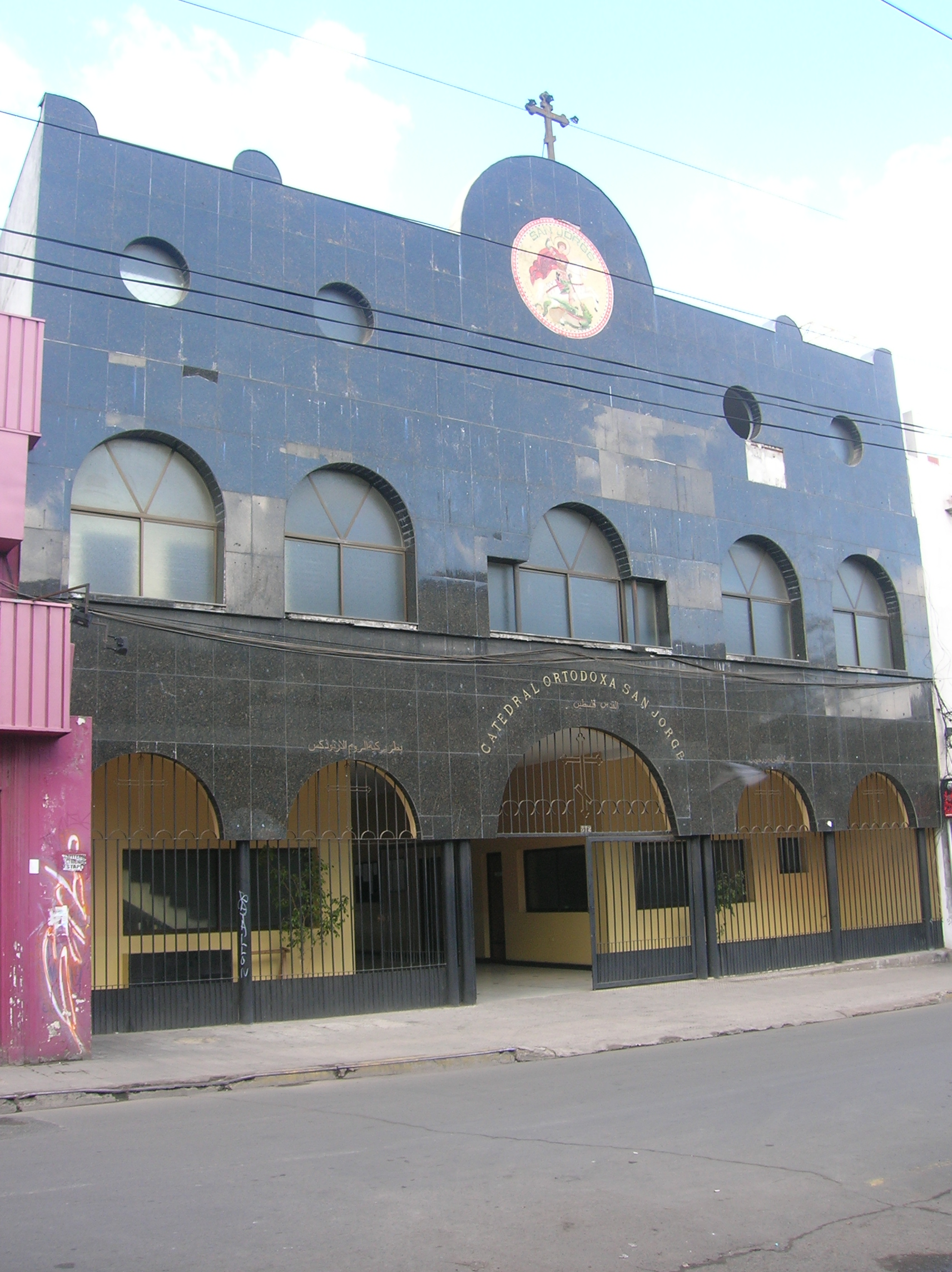
St George's Orthodox Cathedral, Santiago

The Antiochian Orthodox Archdiocese of Santiago and All Chile (Spanish: Arquidiócesis Ortodoxa Antioquena de Santiago y todo Chile) is the Greek Orthodox Church of Antioch archdiocese in Chile. Its current Metropolitan is Sergio Abad.

The Greek Orthodox Christians built St George's Orthodox Cathedral, Santiago (Catedral Ortodoxa San Jorge) in Santiago in 1917. It is a cathedral of the Church of Antioch with six parishes.

== See also ==
- Assembly of Canonical Orthodox Bishops of Latin America
