= Albanian Orthodox Archdiocese in America =

Ethnic diocese of the Orthodox Church of America

Albanian Archdiocese in America

orthodox

Location
- Country: United States
- Metropolitan: Tikhon (Mollard)
- Headquarters: Boston, Massachusetts

Information
- Denomination: Eastern Orthodox
- Rite: Byzantine Rite
- Language: English, Albanian

Current leadership
- Parent church: Orthodox Church in America
- Archbishop: Nikodhim (Preston)

Map
- The states in which the Albanian Archdiocese has jurisdiction.

Website
- albanianarchdiocese.org

The Albanian Archdiocese, also known as the Albanian Orthodox Archdiocese in America (Albanian: Kryedioqeza Orthodokse Shqiptare në Amerikë), is one of three ethnic dioceses of the Orthodox Church in America (OCA). Its territory includes parishes, and missions located in seven states in the United States – California, Connecticut, Massachusetts, Michigan, New York, Ohio, and Pennsylvania. The current bishop of the archdiocese is Nikodhim Preston.

== History ==
The earliest organized Albanian dioceses were set up under the auspices of the Russian Orthodox Greek Catholic Church in America (now Orthodox Church in America), because the Church of Constantinople would not allow the rise of any Albanian Orthodox Church and officially opposed the use of the Albanian language in churches until 1937 when the Autocephalic Orthodox Church of Albania was recognized by Constantinople.

On March 18, 1908, as a result of the Hudson Incident, Fan Noli was ordained as a priest by Metropolitan Platon in the United States. In March 1908, Noli thus led the first Divine Liturgy in Albanian in the U.S.

After political dislocations following the October Revolution of 1917 in Russia, all ties with the Russian Orthodox church were severed, and the Albanian churches under Noli became independent.

After World War II, following the controversies about Noli's status, and the political divergences of Albanian-Americans with the rise of Communism in Albania, Patriarch of Constantinople, Athenagoras, to send a canonical bishop, Mark (Lipa), who organized the diocese in 1949–1950 and accepted into it the considerable community in Chicago and an older parish, the first of three Albanian Orthodox parishes to locate in South Boston.

Ten other Albanian Orthodox parishes incorporated under Bishop Theofan's archdiocese and two parishes persisted in an "independent" status.

By October 1971, with the acceptance of Bishop Stephen and the Albanian Orthodox Archdiocese in America as a constituent diocese of the OCA, the canonical controversy was ended. Meanwhile, the Albanian Orthodox Diocese of America founded by Lipa continued under the jurisdiction of the Church of Constantinople affiliated with the Greek Orthodox Church in America.

== Bishops ==
The bishop of the archdiocese from 2005 to 2019 was Nikon Liolin, who was elected to the position of Bishop of Boston and the Albanian Archdiocese on October 22, 2003. He was later installed as Bishop of Boston, New England, and the Albanian Archdiocese on December 18, 2005, reflecting his election by the Holy Synod to simultaneously head the OCA's Diocese of New England which is based in Hartford, Connecticut. Archbishop Nikon died on September 1, 2019. On September 10, 2019, the OCA announced that Metropolitan Tikhon Mollard would be the locum tenens for the diocese until a successor was found.

The current bishop of the archdiocese is Nikodhim Preston. Bishop Nikodhim was ordained to the episcopacy and enthroned as Bishop of Boston and the Albanian Archdiocese on September 16, 2023, at the Cathedral of St. George in Boston.

== Annual Convention ==
The Annual Convention is the supreme legislative and administrative authority in all secular matters of the archdiocese. It is composed of the bishop, the clergy of the archdiocese, and lay delegates representing each parish within the jurisdiction of the Albanian Orthodox Archdiocese in America.

== Deaneries ==
The diocese is grouped geographically into three deaneries, each consisting of a number of parishes. Each deanery is headed by a parish priest, known as a dean. The deans coordinate activities in their area's parishes, and report to the diocesan bishop. The current deaneries of the Albanian Archdiocese and their territories are:

- Great Lakes Deanery – Michigan, New York, and Ohio
- Massachusetts Deanery – California and Massachusetts
- Mid-Atlantic Deanery – Connecticut, New York, and Pennsylvania

== See also ==
- Albanian Orthodox Diocese of America
- Albanian Orthodox Church

== Notes and references ==
- Official site of the Albanian Archdiocese in America
- Biography on oca.org
- 2005 interview with Bishop Nikon
