= Greek Orthodox Metropolis of Mexico =

Eparchy of the Greek Orthodox Church

Orthodox

Location
- Territory: Mexico; Central America; Colombia; Venezuela; Caribbean
- Headquarters: Mexico City

Statistics
- Parishes: 116 (Central America); 14 (Venezuela/Colombia); 10 (Caribbean); 7 (Mexico/Panama)

Information
- Denomination: Eastern Orthodox
- Rite: Byzantine Rite
- Established: 1996
- Cathedral: Archdiocesan Church of Agia Sophia
- Language: Greek, Spanish

Current leadership
- Parent church: Ecumenical Patriarchate of Constantinople
- Governance: Episcopal
- Patriarch: Bartholomew I of Constantinople
- Metropolitan: Metropolitan Iakovos of Mexico

Website
- arzobispado.org

The Greek Orthodox Metropolis of Mexico (Greek: Ιερά Μητρόπολις Μεξικού, Spanish: Sacro Arzobispado Ortodoxo Griego de Mexico), headquartered in Mexico City, Mexico, is an eparchy of the Ecumenical Patriarchate of Constantinople. Metropolitan Iakovos of Mexico became primate in 2024.

== History ==
Following the retirement of Archbishop Iakovos (Coucouzis) of America, Ecumenical Bartholomew I of Constantinople determined that the church in the Western Hemisphere would be better served, if the then Greek Orthodox Archdiocese of North and South America were to be re-structured into separate jurisdictions. Subsequently in July 1996, a new metropolis for Central America and the Islands of the Caribbean was established, to which Metropolitan Athenagoras was elected.

The metropolis covers a vast region, including Mexico, all the countries of Central America, two countries of South America (Colombia and Venezuela) and all the island countries of the Caribbean, including Cuba, Puerto Rico, Haiti, and the Dominican Republic.

Since the Holy Metropolis of Mexico is under the direct jurisdiction of the Ecumenical Patriarchate, thus functioning separately and apart from the Greek Orthodox Archdiocese of America, nevertheless the metropolis reflects and considers itself a daughter church of the American jurisdiction, which nurtured the region of Central and South America throughout most of the previous century.

== Organization ==
The Greek Orthodox Metropolis of Mexico, Central America and the Caribbean Islands is a single metropolis with the countries of: Mexico, Guatemala, Belize, El Salvador, Honduras, Nicaragua, Costa Rica, Panama, Colombia, Venezuela, and the Caribbean Islands.

The central church, the Archdiocesan Church of Agia Sophia, is the headquarters of the Metropolis.

=== Metropolitan ===
- Metropolitan Athenagoras of Mexico (1996-2024)
- Metropolitan Iakovos of Mexico (since 2024)

=== Assistant Bishops ===
- Bishop Isyhios of Marciana, since 2020
- Bishop Timotheos of Assos, since 2020
- Bishop Athenagoras of Myrina, since 2020
- Bishop Osios of Sasima, since 2024
