= Russian Orthodox Patriarchal Parishes in the USA =

Group of parishes of the Russian Orthodox Church in the United States

The Russian Orthodox Church in the USA is the name of the group of parishes of the Russian Orthodox Church in America that are under the canonical authority of the Patriarch of Moscow and all Rus'. They were previously known as the Russian Exarchate of North America before autocephaly was granted to the Orthodox Church in America (OCA) in 1970. According to a census of Orthodox Christians in the United States by Alexei Krindatch for 2020, there were 9,773 adherents, but only 1,562 regularly attended. There are 30+ parishes and 2 monastic communities.

== Bishops ==
Vicar of His Holiness Patriarch of Moscow and All Russia, Administrator of the Patriarchal parishes in the USA:

- Macarius (Svistun), Bishop of Uman (1970–1974)
- Job (Tyvoniuk), Bishop of Zaraisk (1975–1976)
- Irenaeus (Seredny), Bishop of Serpukhov (1976–1982)
- Clement (Kapalin), Bishop of Serpukhov (1982–1990)
- Macarius (Svistun), Bishop of Klin (1990–1992)
- Paul (Ponomaryov), Bishop of Zaraisk (1992–1999)
- Mercurius (Ivanov), Bishop of Zaraisk (2000–2009)
- Job (Smakouz), Bishop of Kashira (2009–2010)
- Justinian (Ovchinnikov), Archbishop of Naro-Fominsk (2010–2014)
- John (Roshchin) (2014–2018)
- Matthew (Andreev) (temporary administrator since 14 October 2018)

== List of Parishes ==
All of the parishes of the exarchate were given a choice to join the OCA when it was granted autocephaly. The parishes that remained under the jurisdiction of the Patriarch of Moscow are overseen by the patriarchal vicar based at St. Nicholas Russian Orthodox Cathedral in Manhattan. The parishes that remained were the following:

- St. Nicholas Church, Brookside, Alabama
- St. Demetrius Monastery, Bellflower, California
- Christ the Savior Church, San Francisco, California
- St. Nicholas Cathedral, San Francisco, California (since 2022, the rector of the cathedral and the Dean of the Western States is Priest Michael Kozyrev
- Church of All Saints Glorified in the Russian Land, San Francisco, California
- Our Lady of Kazan Church, San Diego, California
- Resurrection Church, Chicago, Illinois
- Dormition Church, Benld, Illinois
- Holy Trinity Church, Baltimore, Maryland
- St. Elias Church, Battle Creek, Michigan
- St. Innocent Church, Detroit, Michigan
- St. Michael the Archangel Church, Detroit, Michigan
- Church of St. Andrew the First-Called Apostle, East Lansing, Michigan
- Holy Trinity Church, Saginaw, Michigan
- St. John Chrysostom Church, Grand Rapids, Michigan
- House Chapel of St. Seraphim of Sarov, Westtown, New York
- St. Demetrius Church, Jackson, Michigan
- St. Nicholas Church, Bayonne, New Jersey
- Sts. Peter and Paul Church, Elizabeth, New Jersey
- Three Saints Church, Garfield, New Jersey
- Holy Cross Church, Hackettstown, New Jersey
- Sts. Peter and Paul Church; Passaic, New Jersey
- St. John the Baptist Church, Little Falls, New Jersey
- St. Olga Church, Somerset, New Jersey
- St. Mark Chapel, New York City
- Church of St. George the Great Martyr, New York
- Church of All Saints Glorified in the Russian Land, Pine Bush, New York
- St. John the Baptist Chapel, Bronx, New York
- St. Stephen Church, Lorain, Ohio
- Nativity of Christ Church, Youngstown, Ohio
- St. Nicholas Church, Chester, Pennsylvania
- St. Nicholas Church, Pageville, Edinboro, Pennsylvania
- St. Nicholas Church, Reading, Pennsylvania
- Sts. Peter and Paul Church, Mount Union, Pennsylvania
- St. Nicholas Church, Wilkes-Barre, Pennsylvania
- St. Andrew the Apostle Church, Philadelphia, Pennsylvania
- St. Michael the Archangel Church, Philadelphia, Pennsylvania
- Sts. Peter and Paul Church, Scranton, Pennsylvania
- Sts. Peter and Paul Church, Burgaw, North Carolina
- St. Gregory the Theologian Church, Tampa, Florida
- Sts. Peter and Paul Church, Manchester, New Hampshire
- Church of St. George the Great Martyr, Buffalo, New York
- All Exarchate parishes and clergy in Canada

Maps of parishes have been published on the basis of 2010 data.

== See also ==
- Assembly of Canonical Orthodox Bishops of the United States of America
