= Orthodox Church in America =

Eastern Orthodox church in North America

- Abbreviation: OCA
- Type: Autocephaly
- Classification: Christian
- Orientation: Russian Orthodoxy
- Polity: Episcopal
- Primate: Metropolitan Tikhon (Mollard)
- Bishops: 14
- Parishes: 683
- Monasteries: 20
- Associations: Christian Churches Together, National Council of Churches
- Language: English, Russian, Church Slavonic, Greek, Serbian, Albanian, Bulgarian, Romanian, French, Spanish, Aleut, Tlingit, Yup'ik
- Liturgy: Byzantine Rite (Note: There was once a Western Rite mission, located in Edmonton under the Archdiocese of Canada. As of September 2024, it is now under the Antiochian Western Rite Vicariate.)
- Headquarters: Springfield, Virginia, United States
- Territory: United States; Canada; Mexico
- Possessions: formerly Australia and South America
- Founder: Herman of Alaska (as Russian Orthodox mission in Alaska); Innocent of Alaska (as Diocese of Kamchatka, the Kurile and Aleutian Islands); Irenaeus Bekish (as autocephalous Orthodox Church in America)
- Recognition: Autocephaly recognized by the Russian, Bulgarian, Georgian, Polish, Serbian, and Czech and Slovak Churches
- Branched from: Russian Orthodox Church (1963)
- Separations: Antiochian Orthodox Christian Archdiocese of North America (1924); American Orthodox Catholic Church (1927)
- Members: 900,000 (baptized members, 2015), 74,415 total adherents (USA), 32,484 regular attendees (USA)
- Official website: www.oca.org

The Orthodox Church in America (OCA) is an Eastern Orthodox Christian church based in North America. The OCA consists of more than 680 parishes, missions, communities, monasteries and institutions in the United States, Canada, and Mexico. In 2020, it had an estimated 74,415 members in the United States. In 2015, the OCA claimed 900,000 baptized members.

The OCA has its origins in a mission established by eight Russian Orthodox monks in Alaska, then part of Russian America, in 1794. This grew into a full diocese of the Russian Orthodox Church named the Diocese of Alaska and Aleutines with the Cathedral in Sitka (founded by Russians with the name of Novoarkhangelsk). The first Orthodox missionary bishop was in 1840 Saint Innocent of Alaska. After the United States purchased Alaska from Russia in 1867, the diocese was granted jurisdiction for all North America and the see moved to San Francisco between 1872 and 1903, and later in New York City after 1903. By the late 19th century, the Russian Orthodox Church had grown in other areas of the United States due to the arrival of immigrants from areas of Eastern and Central Europe, many of them formerly of the Eastern Catholic Churches ("Greek Catholics"), and from the Middle East. These immigrants, regardless of nationality or ethnic background, were united under a single North American diocese of the Russian Orthodox Church.

After the Bolshevik Revolution, Patriarch Tikhon of Moscow (previously Bishop of the Diocese of Alaska and Aleutines, named in 1900 also Bishop of all North America) directed all Russian Orthodox churches outside of Russia to govern themselves autonomously. Orthodox churches in America became a self-governing Russian Orthodox Greek Catholic Church in America in 1924 under the leadership of Metropolitan Platon (Rozhdestvensky), popularly called the Metropolia (from Russian: митрополия). The Russian Orthodox Greek Catholic Church in America was granted autocephaly by the Russian Orthodox Church in 1970, and renamed the Orthodox Church in America. Its hierarchs are part of the Assembly of Canonical Orthodox Bishops of the United States of America. While the OCA is in full communion with most Eastern Orthodox churches in the world, the OCA's autocephaly is not fully recognized.

Unlike most Orthodox jurisdictions in the United States, the OCA does not have an affinity towards any particular foreign nationality, but most OCA members are ethnically Euro-American, and most OCA clergy are Americans. However, the OCA does have other minority ethnic dioceses for Romanian, Bulgarian, and Albanian immigrants. Additionally, as a consequence of history, certain ethnic groups (particularly Russian Americans, Ruthenian Americans and Alaska Natives) are disproportionately represented in the OCA compared to the general population. Liturgical and church traditions, such as forms of singing, liturgics, vestments, iconography, use of Church Slavonic, and architecture broadly reflect those of Russian Orthodoxy.

The OCA states that currently the Russian, Bulgarian, Georgian, Polish, Serbian, and Czech and Slovak churches recognize the autocephaly of the OCA. Among the churches that do not recognize it is the Ecumenical Patriarchate of Constantinople, which argues that the Russian Church did not have the authority to grant autocephaly, partly because the Russian Church at the time was considered to be heavily influenced by the Soviet government. The Ecumenical Patriarch also cites Canon 28 of the Council of Chalcedon, which asserted the jurisdiction of the bishop of Constantinople in dioceses located "among the barbarians" (i.e. outside the Roman Empire) as the source of the Ecumenical Patriarchate's authority in the matter. As a result of this, the Ecumenical Patriarchate offers the Greek Orthodox Archdiocese of America ("GOArch") as an alternative for orthodox Americans. The remaining churches do not recognize the OCA as autocephalous, although they do recognize the self-governing nature of the church. While the subject of political and ecclesiastical dispute, this controversy does not impair the communion between the OCA and the wider Eastern Orthodox Church.

== Official name ==
According to the April 1970 Tomos of Autocephaly granted by the Russian Orthodox Church, the official name of the church is The Autocephalous Orthodox Church in America. The more comprehensive March 1970 Agreement of Tomos of Autocephaly, however, states in Article VIII that the legal name of the church was changed to Orthodox Church in America (the Russian language does not use the grammatical articles).

== History ==
=== Missionary work ===
The first Eskaleut peoples to become Eastern Orthodox Christians were the Aleuts living in contact with Siberian fur traders in the mid 18th century. They had been baptized mostly by their Eastern Orthodox trading partners or during occasional visits by priests serving aboard exploring vessels of the Russian navy. A Russian colony in Alaska was established in 1784 by merchant Grigory Shelikhov. Shelikhov's attempt to colonize Kodiak Island was met with resistance by the native population. He returned to Russia and installed Alexandr Baranov as director of the colony. In order to convince the Russian imperial court of the seriousness of his colonial ambitions, Shelikhov recruited volunteers from the Valaam Monastery, an environment that appears strikingly similar to the Kodiak archipelago's landscape, as well as the Konevsky Monastery, to travel to the new colony.

The volunteers, led by Archimandrite Joasaph Bolotov, departed Saint Petersburg on December 21, 1793, and arrived at Kodiak Island on September 24, 1794. When they arrived, they were shocked by the harsh treatment of the Kodiak natives at the hands of the Russian settlers and Baranov. They sent reports to Shelikhov detailing the abuse of the local population, but were ignored. In response, however, the Holy Synod created an auxiliary episcopal see in Alaska in 1796, and elected Fr. Joasaph as bishop. Fr. Joasaph and a small party returned to Russia in 1798 for his consecration and to offer first-hand accounts of what they had seen. During their return voyage to the colony in May 1799, their ship sank and all aboard died. In 1800, Baranov placed the remaining monks under house arrest and forbade them to have any further contact with the local population.

Despite the lack of leadership, the Eastern Orthodox mission in Alaska continued to grow. In 1811, however, the Holy Synod officially closed the episcopal see. It was not until 1823 that the Holy Synod sent instructions for a new priest to travel to Alaska. John Veniaminov of Irkutsk volunteered for the journey, and left Russia in May 1823. He and his family arrived at Unalaska Island on July 29, 1824. In 1840, after the death of his wife, Veniaminov accepted monastic tonsure and, taking the name Innocent, ordination as the Bishop of Kamchatka, the Kurile and Aleutian Islands, making him the first ruling bishop of the Alaskan mission since Bishop Joasaph. Bishop Innocent was elevated to archbishop in 1850 (he became in 1868 Metropolitan of Moscow). For his missionary and scholarly work that had focused on blending indigenous Alaskan languages and cultures with Orthodox tradition, Innocent became a saint of the Eastern Orthodox Church in America in 1977, and is referred to as the Enlightener of the Aleuts and Apostle to the Americas.

=== Growth ===
In 1868, the first Orthodox church in the contiguous United States was established in San Francisco, California. From the late 19th century until World War I, there was a wave of immigration to the U.S. Within this wave of new people, were immigrants from traditionally Orthodox Christian regions of the world. There were many immigrants from the Russian and Austro-Hungarian Empires, who formed the backbone of the diocese. Numerous parishes were established across the country throughout the rest of the 19th century. Although these parishes were typically multi-ethnic, most received support from the missionary diocese. In 1872 the diocesan see was relocated from Alaska to the city of San Francisco, California in the United States. The mission itself was instituted as a separate Diocese of Alaska and the Aleutian Islands on June 10, 1870, subsequent to the sale of Alaska to the United States in 1867. In November 1870, the first Eastern Orthodox church in New York City was consecrated.

Eastern Catholicism was viewed with suspicion by several Latin Church bishops in the United States; some, such as Archbishop John Ireland of Saint Paul, Minnesota, were actually hostile, especially concerning the matter of married clergy. In 1891, Alexis Toth—a Slovak-born Ruthenian Catholic priest rejected by Bishop Ireland—brought a group of 361 Eastern Catholics into Eastern Orthodoxy. From then until his death in 1909, Toth brought approximately 20,000 Eastern Catholics from 65 independent communities to Eastern Orthodoxy. By 1917, 163 Eastern Catholic parishes consisting of more than 100,000 faithful had been converted. For his efforts, Toth was glorified as a saint by the OCA in 1994.

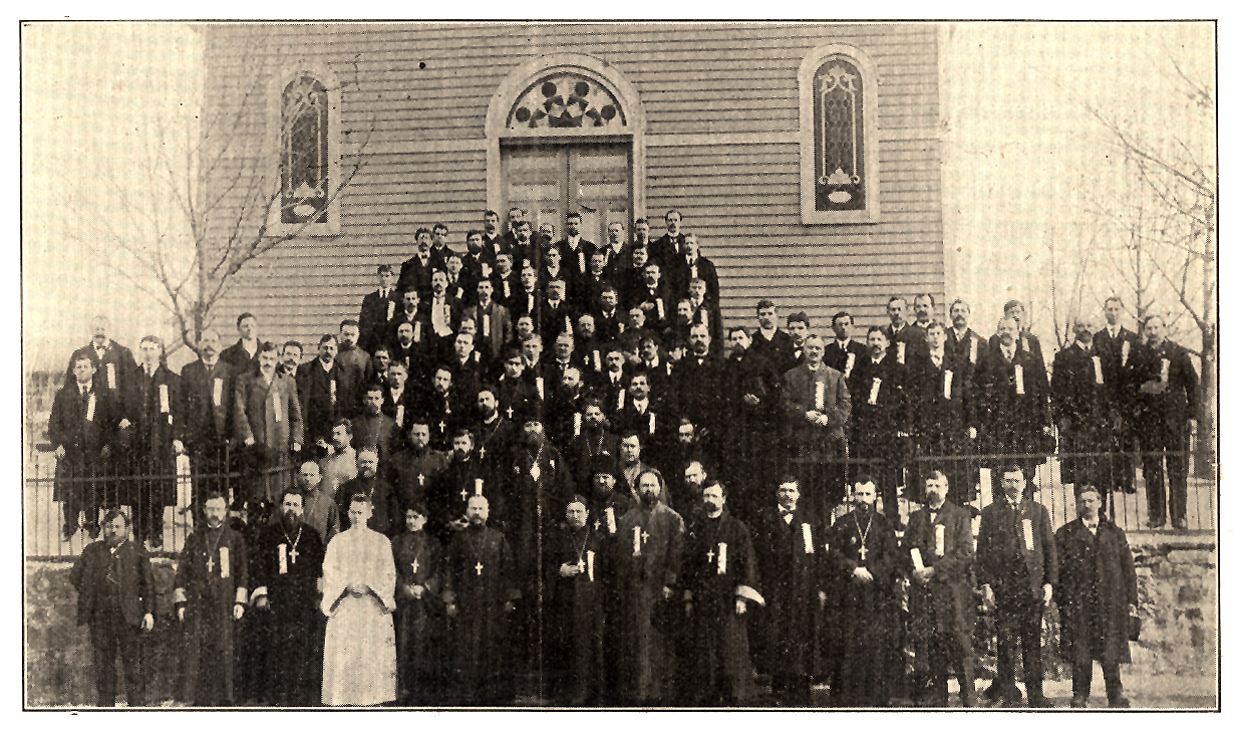
The first All-American Sobor was held March 5–7, 1907.

In recognition of the expansion of the church beyond Alaska, Bishop Tikhon (Belavin) petitioned the Holy Synod to change the diocese's title to the Diocese of the Aleutians and North America. This was approved in February 1900. (Note: "His Grace, Bishop Tikhon (Bellavin) of Moscow: Patriarch and Confessor of Moscow, Enlightener of North America". OCA.) He consecrated Innocent (Pustynsky) as auxiliary bishop for Alaska in 1903, and in 1904 he consecrated Raphael Hawaweeny to administer to the Arab parishes. In 1905, Bishop Tikhon relocated the diocesan administration from San Francisco to New York City.

In a report to the Holy Synod that year, Bishop Tikhon proposed dramatic changes in the operation of the diocese. Recognizing the needs of the growing multi-ethnic Orthodox community, he recommended reforming the missionary diocese into a self-supporting American diocese, composed of numerous ethnic auxiliary dioceses. His plan called for Russian (New York), Arab (Brooklyn), Serbian (Chicago), and Greek dioceses. Additionally, he called for the formation of a governing council, composed of clergy and laity, which would meet to discuss administrative and canonical issues. On March 5, 1907, the first All-American Sobor convened in Mayfield, Pennsylvania. Following Archbishop Tikhon's reassignment to Russia that year, however, few of his reforms were implemented.

During this period, education and charity was a focus of the diocese. In 1905, Archbishop Tikhon oversaw the creation of an Eastern Orthodox seminary in Minneapolis, Minnesota. St. Platon's Seminary moved from Minneapolis to Tenafly, New Jersey, in 1912 and enrolled 78 students from then until 1923. In 1916, an unaccredited Russian women's college was established in Brooklyn. An immigrant society and orphanage also were established, as well as the first Orthodox monasteries in the United States (Saint Tikhon's Monastery for men in 1905 and Holy Virgin Protection for women in 1915).

By 1917, the American diocese was the largest in the Russian Orthodox Church. It had grown from ten parishes in 1890 to more than 350. Most of the funding for the diocese was provided by Russian Church, via the Imperial Missionary Society. The connections between the American diocese and the Russian Church would be severely compromised by the events of that year.

=== Revolution and turmoil ===
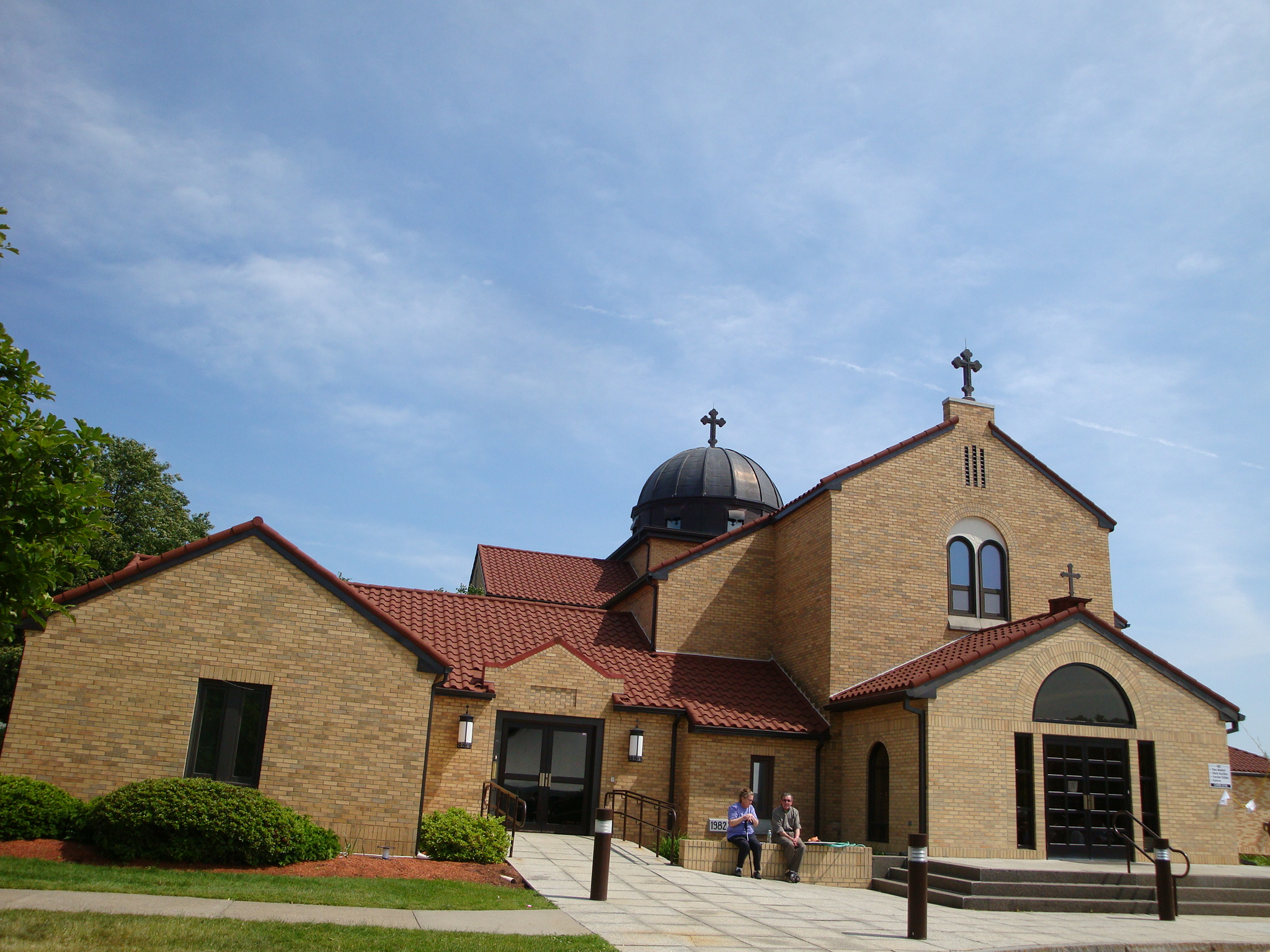
The Albanian Orthodox Church in Worcester, Massachusetts

The Russian Revolution of 1917 and the subsequent establishment of the Communist Soviet government ushered in a period of repression for the Russian Orthodox Church. Church property was confiscated and, when Patriarch Tikhon resisted, he was imprisoned from April 1922 until June 1923. On November 20, 1920, Patriarch Tikhon formally authorized Russian Orthodox bishops to set up temporarily independent organizations, until such time as normal communications with and governance from the patriarchate could be restored.

Ethnic groups within the American diocese began to re-align themselves with other national churches. In 1918, a group of Ukrainians in Canada formed the Ukrainian Greek Orthodox Church in Canada, and in 1922, the Greek Orthodox Archdiocese of America was established. In 1926, the Serbs aligned with the Serbian Orthodox Church. As a result of the realignments, Aftimios (Ofiesh) and Platon chartered the American Orthodox Catholic Church in 1927.

In Soviet Russia, a splinter group known as the Living Church gained official state recognition in place of the Russian Orthodox Church in 1922. In the United States, a group of Living Church clergy led by John Kedrovsky attempted to depose ruling American hierarch Bishop Alexander (Nemolovsky). Bishop Alexander, in addition to the political and ethnic struggles of his diocese, had also to deal with mounting Church debt as a result of the loss of funds from the Russian Church. He was forced to mortgage church property to pay creditors and was replaced, in 1922, by Archbishop Platon (Rozhdestvensky), who had previously served as archbishop of the diocese from 1907 to 1914.

After Archbishop Platon's return, he was elected Metropolitan of All America and Canada at the third All-American Sobor in November 1922. Soon after, Communist authorities in Russia (in collaboration with the Living Church) attempted to seize church assets in the United States. In response, the fourth All-American Sobor convened in April 1924. During the Sobor, the historic step of declaring the North American diocese to be temporarily self-governing was taken. This was meant to be necessary only until relations with the Russian Church could be normalized, and the justification for the move was the earlier decree by Patriarch Tikhon. The diocese was officially incorporated as the Russian Orthodox Greek Catholic Church of America.

Despite the conditions set out by Tikhon's decree for this temporary autonomy not being met, the American diocese of the Russian church declared self-governance in 1924, against the protests of the patriarchate, with which it had communication and which was capable of governance had its American branch been willing. The refusal of the American branch to submit to the patriarchate thus based itself officially on a document whose conditions it had not met. In reality, however, it was a fear of Communism and a belief that the patriarchate had been compromised which fueled the rebellion, paired with a desire on the part of the Metropolia to dissociate itself from the Russian Orthodox Church Outside Russia (ROCOR) of which it had allegedly been part. (Note: ROCOR and OCA on OrthodoxWiki)

Despite the declaration of self-governance, Kedrovsky and the Living Church were awarded the church's diocesan cathedral in New York City. To prevent further loss of property, the diocese allowed individual parishes to take ownership of their properties, which made them effectively independent. This, combined with the increasing number of ethnic parishes aligning themselves with other Orthodox jurisdictions (as well as some non-Orthodox), led to a unique situation in Orthodox America whereby multiple jurisdictions overlapped geographically. The remainder of the American Church became known informally as the Metropolia (or under the jurisdiction of the Metropolitan). Following Patriarch Tikhon's death, the Russian Orthodox Church, led by Metropolitan Sergius, began cooperating with the Soviet government. In 1933, the Russian Church declared the Metropolia to be schismatic.

A third Russian church, the Synod of Russian Orthodox Church Outside Russia (also known as the Karlovci Synod), formed in 1920. The Synod saw itself as representing all Russian Orthodox abroad, including the Metropolia. The Metropolia cooperated with the synod at first but severed relations with them in 1926, citing the synod's increasing claims of authority in America. The synod, for its part, suspended Metropolitan Platon and his clergy. In 1935, an agreement entitled "Temporary Regulations of the Russian Orthodox Church Abroad" was signed that normalized relations between the Metropolia and the ROCOR. The 6th All-American Sobor, held in 1937, affirmed that while the Metropolia remained autonomous, it reported to the ROCOR in matters of faith.

The ROCOR, forced to leave Yugoslavia toward the end of World War II, eventually established its base of operations in New York City. In 1946, it was decided at the 7th All-American Sobor that the Metropolia would sever its ties with the ROCOR and attempt to return to the Patriarchate of Moscow. This return was proposed with the stipulation that the Metropolia be allowed to retain its autonomy. When this condition was not met, the Metropolia continued as a self-governing church.

Although there were periodic attempts at reconciliation between the Metropolia and the Russian Church over the next few decades, no serious progress was made. During this time, the ethnic character of the Metropolia began to change. Since many Russian immigrants to America aligned themselves with the vocally anti-Communist ROCOR, the Metropolia experienced its growth increasingly through the addition of English-speaking converts. As a result, the ethnic makeup of the Metropolia began to shift away from a purely Slavic one that had included mainly Russians, Ukrainians and Rusyns.

=== Move toward unity and independence ===
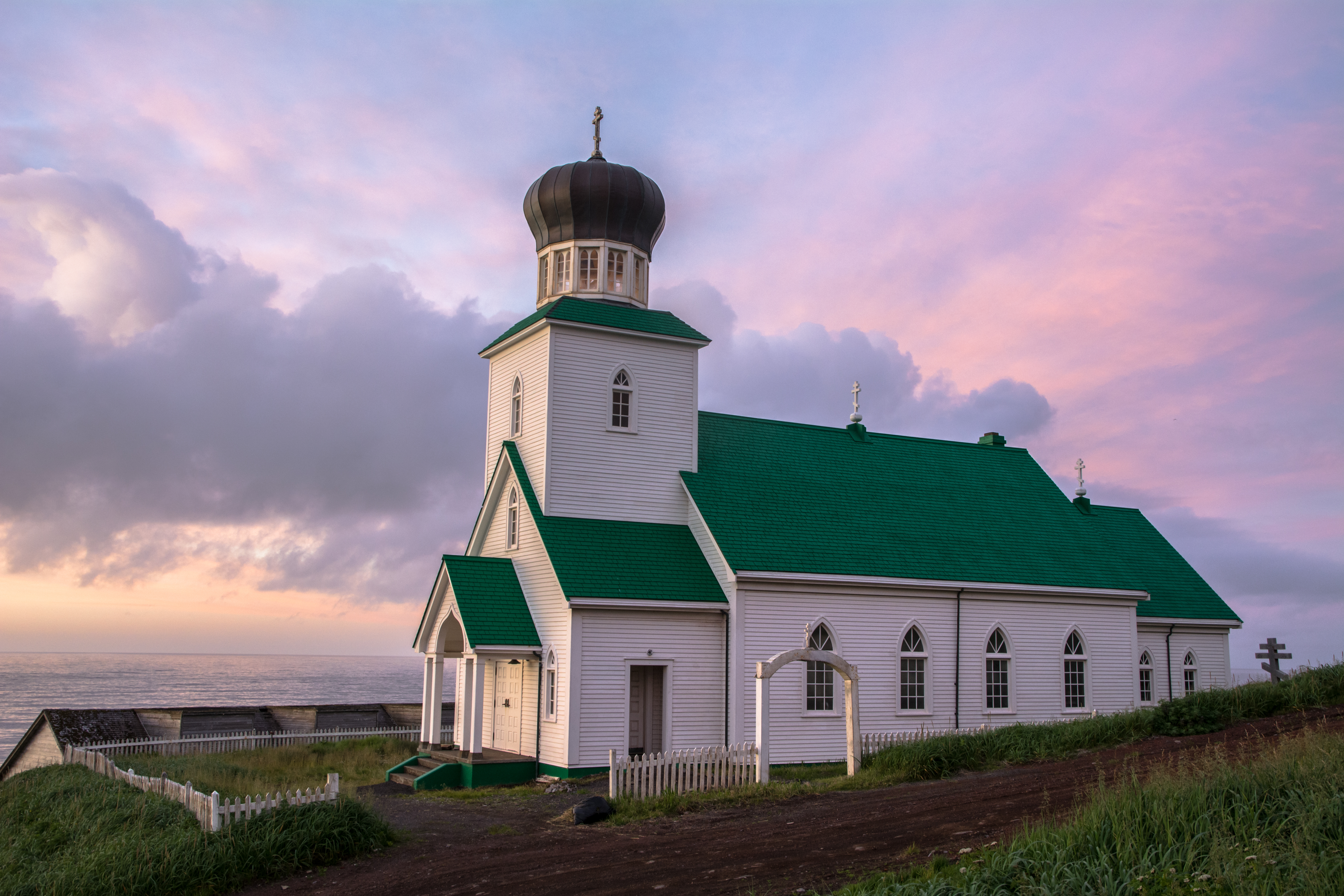
St. George the Great Martyr Orthodox Church, St. George Island, Alaska

Prior to the 13th All-American Sobor in November 1967, a proposal was prepared to change the name of the church from the Russian Orthodox Greek Catholic Church of America to the "Orthodox Church in America". The Council of Bishops, already aware of the proposal, forbade a vote on the matter. After much debate, however, a non-binding straw poll was permitted. The result of the poll was decidedly in favor of the name change. As a result, the decision to deal with the matter at another Sobor (to be held in two years) was made.

In the early 1960s, the Metropolia resumed communication with the Patriarch of Moscow. In 1968, the Metropolia and the Russian Church communicated informally to resolve long-standing differences. Representatives from the Metropolia sought the right of self-governance, as well as the removal of Russian jurisdiction from all matters concerning the American Church. Official negotiations on the matter began in 1969. On April 10, 1970, Patriarch Alexius I and fourteen bishops of the Russian Church's Holy Synod signed the official Tomos of Autocephaly, which made the newly renamed Orthodox Church in America the fifteenth autocephalous Orthodox Church. The name change, as well as the granting of autocephaly, was officially accepted at the 14th All-American Sobor (also known as the 1st All-American Council in recognition of the church's new-found independence) in October 1970.

The granting of autocephaly by the Moscow Patriarchate was strongly condemned by the Ecumenical Patriarchate of Constantinople as an act that exceeded the former′s authority and violated the canons. Apologists for the OCA's autocephaly claim that the decree did not need the approval of the Ecumenical Patriarchate, as it was an internal matter for the Russian Orthodox Church to decide. Many autocephalous churches, the Russian Church included, were not recognized as such for many years, albeit their autocephaly was granted by the Ecumenical Patriarchate. All canonical Orthodox churches recognize the OCA as canonical and its sacraments as valid, however.

The OCA was a member of the Standing Conference of Orthodox Bishops in America (SCOBA), together with the Greek Orthodox Archdiocese of America, the Antiochian Orthodox Christian Archdiocese of North America (AOCA) and the other member jurisdictions. In 2010, SCOBA was dissolved with the creation of the new Assembly of Canonical Orthodox Bishops of North and Central America, which was mandated by Orthodox patriarchates in 2009 at a meeting in Switzerland. Serious consideration has been given recently to a possible merger between the OCA and the AOCA. Both groups share a significant common history, in that a Syrian priest, Raphael Hawaweeny, was sent by the Moscow Patriarchate in the late 19th century as a missionary to Arabic-speaking Orthodox Christians living in North America. Raphael was ordained a bishop in 1904, and his flock eventually became the AOCA. Bishop Raphael was canonized in March 2000 by the OCA as St. Raphael of Brooklyn.

=== Financial scandal ===
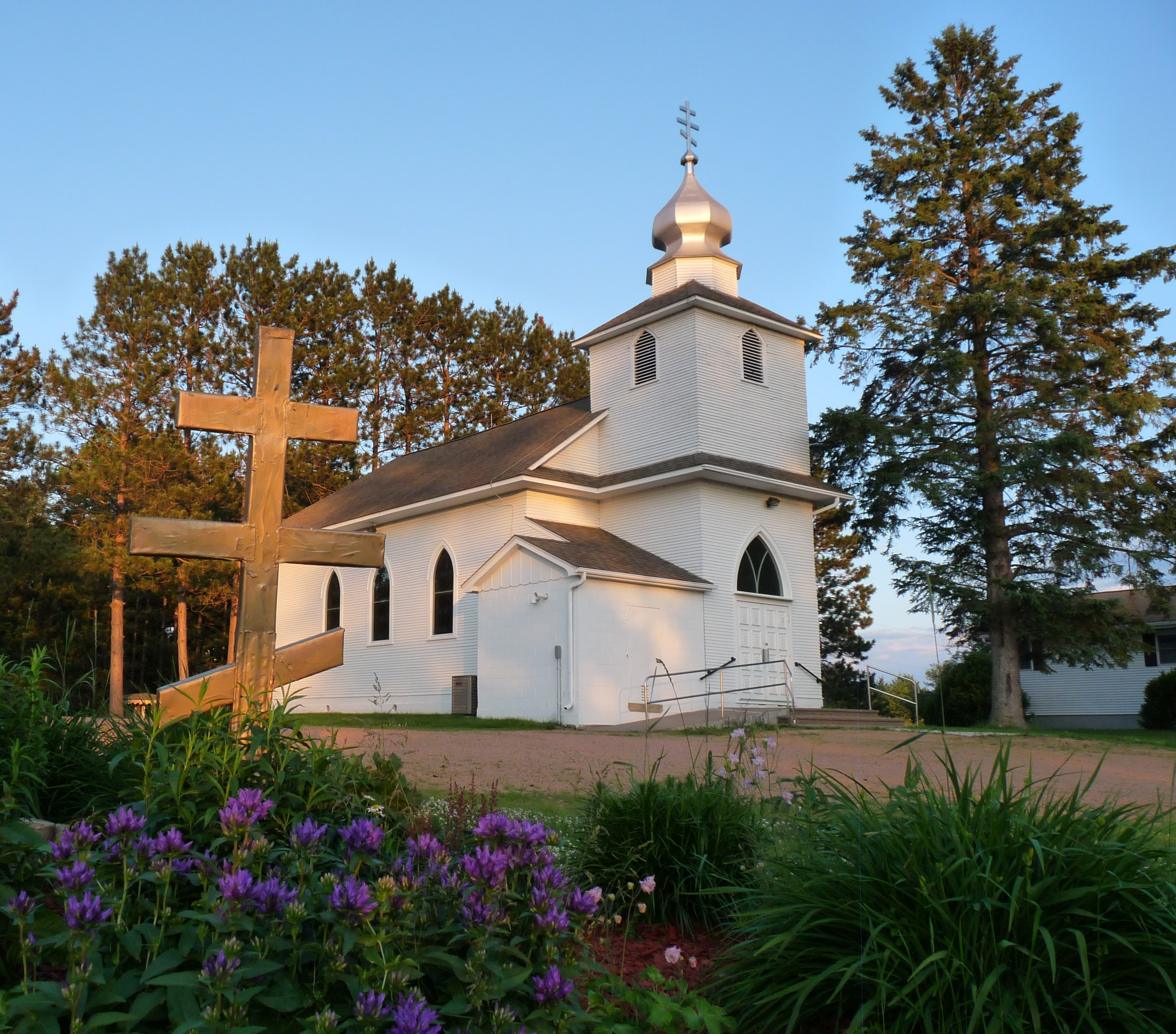
Holy Assumption Orthodox Church, located in Lublin, Wisconsin

In 2005, former treasurer Protodeacon Eric Wheeler publicly accused the OCA administration of financial misconduct. Wheeler alleged that millions of dollars in donations to the church were improperly used for personal expenses or to cover shortfalls in church accounts.

A 32-page report was released on September 3, 2008, that addressed the financial scandal and recommended "discipline" for five individuals, including then-primate Metropolitan Herman, his predecessor Metropolitan Theodosius, and two former treasurers as well as a former comptroller. The same report recommended then-primate Metropolitan Herman immediately resign or retire from his post or risk being defrocked.

One day after the report was released, Herman resigned from his position as metropolitan. That November, the OCA elected a new Primate at its 15th Annual All-American Council. Metropolitan Jonah (Paffhausen) was chosen because he had recently been appointed as a bishop (only 11 days prior) and was viewed to not be involved with the previous financial scandal. Metropolitan Jonah immediately took a strong stance against the previous scandal and became a very public metropolitan, seeking to repair damage done by the previous scandal and bring the OCA into the public realm. Metropolitan Jonah also sought to improve relations with non-Orthodox groups and especially sought to repair the relations between the OCA and traditional Anglican groups. He was invited twice to speak at the conference of the Anglican Church in North America, in 2009 and 2012.

Less than four years after his election, Metropolitan Jonah was asked by the Holy Synod, in a unanimous decision, to resign from his position. While wary of initially releasing information about the resignation, the Holy Synod felt prompted to release a public statement about his release due to rumors that had spread about their intentions. The statement they released on the official website of the OCA detailed several administrative decisions Metropolitan Jonah had made that the Holy Synod felt put the church and its members at risk. In the statement, the Holy Synod clarified the reason they withheld information initially was to protect the reputation and integrity of Metropolitan Jonah as well as protect anyone involved in the specific decisions made by him.

On November 13, 2012, an extraordinary All-American Council elected Archbishop Tikhon (Mollard) of Philadelphia and Eastern Pennsylvania as the Metropolitan of All-America and Canada. He was installed on January 27, 2013. Metropolitan Tikhon is a convert to the Eastern Orthodox faith and a long-time monk of St. Tikhon's Monastery in South Canaan, Pennsylvania.

=== Response to the Russian invasion of Ukraine ===
On February 24, 2022, in response to Russia's invasion of Ukraine, Metropolitan Tikhon issued a statement saying, in part, "I ask that the hostilities be ceased immediately and that President Putin put an end to the military operations. As Orthodox Christians, we condemn violence and aggression." On February 28, 2022, he made an urgent appeal for OCA members to contribute to a fund to aid Ukrainian refugees to be administered by the Orthodox Church of Poland. As of March 8, 2022, over US$433,000 had been raised.

On March 13, 2022, Tikhon sent a letter to Patriarch Kirill of Moscow imploring him to use his influence to help put an end to the war.

The OCA continues to recognize the Ukrainian Orthodox Church as the sole canonical Orthodox church in Ukraine and therefore does not accept communion with the Orthodox Church of Ukraine.

In June 2024, Tikhon visited Ukraine and met with Metropolitan Onufriy Berezovsky of the UOC in a show of solidarity for the people of Ukraine. Members of the OCA and UOC held a joint vigil at the Chernivtsi Cathedral during this four day meeting.

== Membership ==
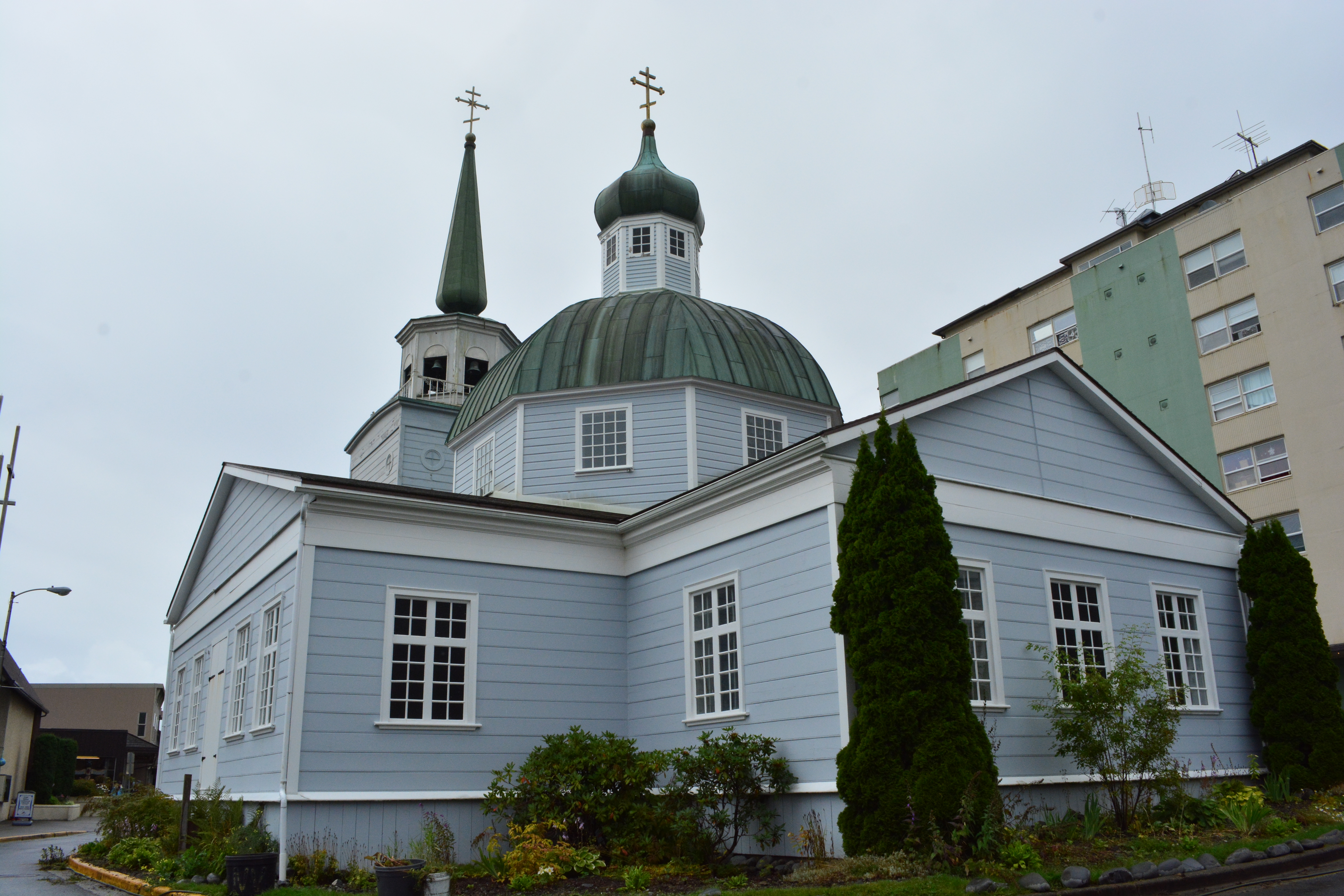
St. Michael's Cathedral, Sitka

The exact number of OCA parishioners is debated. According to the 2006 edition of the Yearbook of American and Canadian Churches, the OCA had 1,064,000 members, an increase of 6.4 percent from 2005. This figure places the OCA as the 24th largest Christian church in the United States, and the second largest Eastern Orthodox church in the country, after the Greek Orthodox Archdiocese of America. In 2015, the OCA claimed 900,000 baptized members, a modest decline from 2006 and 2005.

In 2000, a study by Alexei D. Krindatch, of the Patriarch Athenagoras Orthodox Institute, presented a substantially lower figure — 115,100 adherents (baptized Orthodox who attend services on at least an occasional basis and their children) and 39,400 full members (persons older than 18, paying annual church membership fees). The Greek Orthodox Archdiocese, by comparison, was listed as having 440,000 adherents. In response to the study, an OCA representative stated the church had "around 750,000 adults and children."

In 2004, Jonathan Ivanoff stated in a presentation at the OCA's Evangelization Conference that the church's census population in 2004 was 27,169, and that membership from 1990 to 2000 declined 13 percent. It further stated that the OCA population in the continental United States declined between six and nine percent per year.

In 2011, The Atlas of American Orthodox Christian Churches, published by Holy Cross Orthodox Press and based on research by Alexei Krindatch, was released. It has extensive data on various Eastern Christian denominations in the United States, including both Eastern Orthodox and Oriental Orthodox groups (as well as groups considered uncanonical by those two groups). The publication is endorsed by the Assembly of Canonical Orthodox Bishops and is being used by various Assembly committees as part of their research and planning. The Atlas lists the United States membership of the OCA as 84,900, 33,800 of which it says are regular church attendees. It lists the OCA as having 551 parishes and 19 monasteries in the United States. It also indicates the states with the heaviest concentration of OCA parishes are, in order: Alaska (with 86), Pennsylvania (with 83), California (with 43) and New York (with 41).

In 2020, according to a census done by Alexei Krindatch, the number of regular attendees in the United States had decreased to 74,415, and the number of regular attendees decreased slightly to 32,484. The number of parishes in the United States increased slightly to 559.

== Structure ==
=== Episcopacy ===
The supreme canonical authority of the OCA is the Holy Synod of Bishops, composed of all the church's diocesan bishops. The ex officio chairman of the OCA Holy Synod is the metropolitan. The OCA Holy Synod meets twice annually; however, special sessions can be called either by the metropolitan or at the request of at least three diocesan bishops.

=== Metropolitan ===
The primate of the OCA is the metropolitan. He also serves as the bishop of one of the church's dioceses. With the other bishops of the church, the metropolitan is considered the first among equals. His official title is "Metropolitan of All-America and Canada". His role is to manage the welfare of the church, and to act as its representative with other Orthodox churches, religious organizations, and secular authorities. The metropolitan is elected, when necessary, by the Holy Synod at an All-American Council (a general council of OCA clergy and laity). There are no age or term limits for the metropolitan, and he may retire at any time, but usually does so only for health-related reasons.

=== Dioceses ===
The diocese is the basic church body that comprises all the parishes of a determined geographical area. It is governed by the Diocesan Bishop, with the assistance of a Diocesan Assembly and a Diocesan Council. The OCA is currently composed of twelve geographic and three ethnic dioceses (Albanian, Bulgarian, and Romanian). The boundaries of the ethnic dioceses overlap those of certain geographic ones. These dioceses are the result of smaller ethnic jurisdictions joining the OCA at some point in its history, usually after having broken from other bodies. Dioceses are established by the Holy Synod whenever needed, and the Synod may also modify the boundaries of an existing diocese. Maps of parishes and adherents have been published on the basis of the 2010 census.

=== All-American Council ===
According to the Statute of the Orthodox Church in America, the All-American Council is the "highest legislative and administrative authority within the Church." The council is composed roughly of the metropolitan, all bishops, priests, and selected lay delegates. The purpose of the All-American Council is to discuss and vote on Church matters. When necessary, the Council has also elected new metropolitans.

The period between All-American Councils is set at three years, although this is not always the case. The first thirteen Councils (held from 1907 to 1970) are referred to as All-American Sobors, reflecting the American Church's jurisdictional ties to the Russian Orthodox Church. The fourteenth Sobor (held in 1970) is jointly known as the 1st All-American Council, reflecting the autocephalous status of the OCA. The most recent All-American Council (21st) was held in July 2025 in Phoenix, Arizona.

=== Metropolitan Council ===
The Metropolitan Council is the permanent executive body of the church's administration. It is tasked with implementing the decisions of the All-American Council, as well as handling the church's budgetary concerns. The council is headed by a chairman (the current metropolitan), and is composed of the OCA's chancellor, secretary, treasurer, and selected clergy and lay delegates. It usually meets twice per year but, in December 2006, a rare joint meeting between the Metropolitan Council and the Holy Synod of Bishops was held.

== See also ==
- Timeline of Eastern Orthodoxy in North America
- List of primates of the Orthodox Church in America
- Eastern Orthodox Church organization
- Eastern Orthodoxy in North America
- Assembly of Canonical Orthodox Bishops of the United States of America
- Assembly of Canonical Orthodox Bishops of Canada
- Assembly of Canonical Orthodox Bishops of Latin America

== Sources ==
- Roberson, Ronald G. (2008). "The Orthodox Church in America". The Eastern Christian Churches: A Brief Survey (7th ed.). University Press of the Pontifical Oriental Institute. ISBN 978-8-8721-0359-3. OCLC 1040756029. Archived from the original on 2020-10-26 – via Catholic Near East Welfare Association.
- Tarasar, Constance J.; Erickson, John H., eds. (1975). Orthodox America 1794–1976. Syosset, New York: The Orthodox Church in America Department of History and Archives. LCCN 76368792. OCLC 1245636329. OL 4941373M – via Internet Archive.
