= St. Nicholas Greek Orthodox Church (Manhattan) =

Church in Manhattan, New York

Coordinates: 40°42′37″N 74°00′50″W

- St. Nicholas Greek Orthodox National Shrine
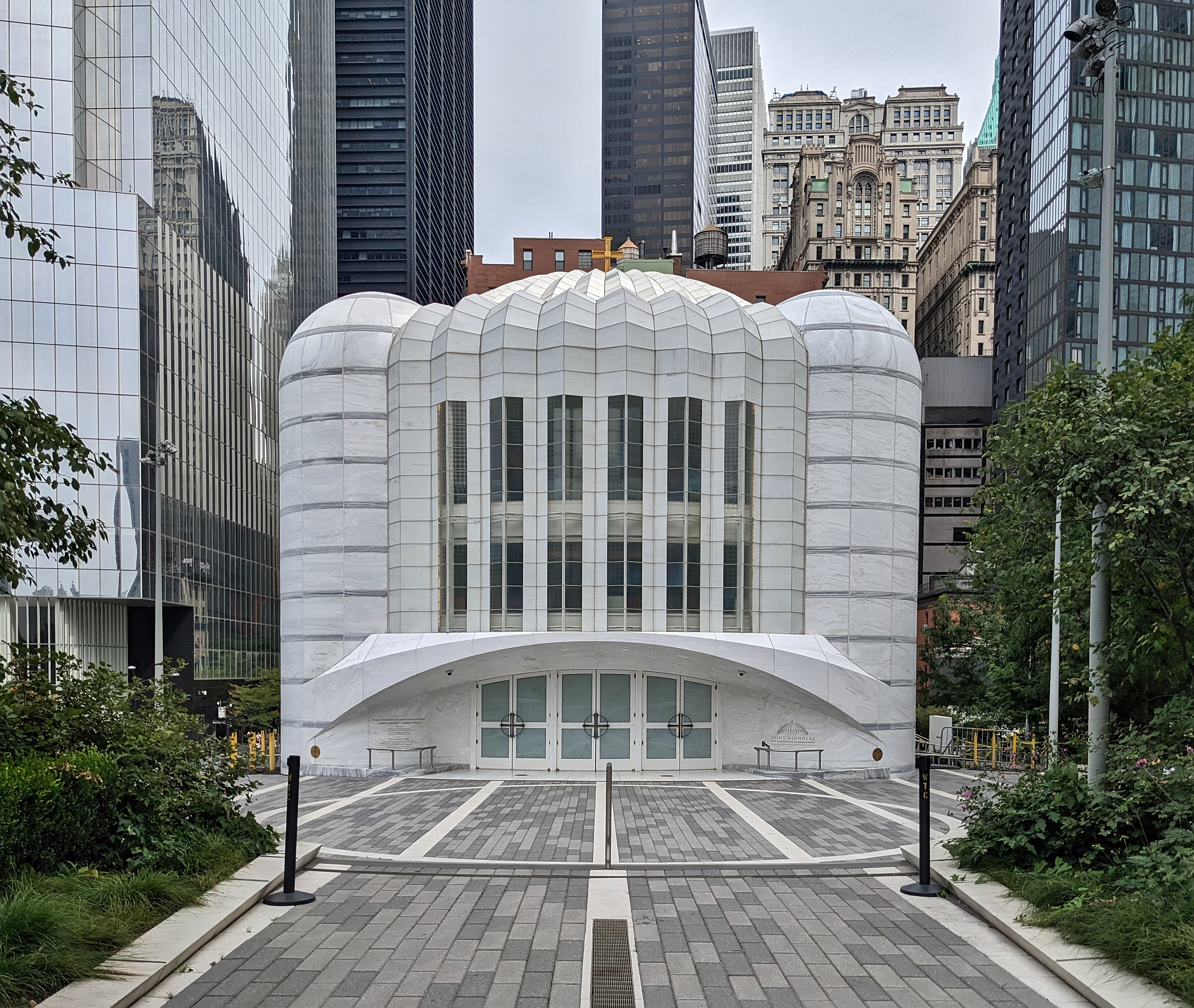
- The Church and National Shrine in August 2023
- St. Nicholas Greek Orthodox Church
- Location: 130 Liberty Street, Manhattan, New York City
- Country: United States
- Denomination: Greek Orthodox
- Website: stnicholaswtc.org

History
- Former name: St. Nicholas Greek Orthodox Church
- Status: Completed
- Founded: 1916
- Founder: Greek immigrants
- Consecrated: July 4, 2022

Architecture
- Architect(s): Santiago Calatrava, Koutsomitis Architects PC
- Architectural type: Modern
- Style: Eastern Orthodox
- Groundbreaking: October 18, 2014
- Completed: December 6, 2022

Specifications
- Length: 56 ft (17 m)
- Width: 22 ft (6.7 m)
- Height: 35 ft (11 m)

Administration
- Archdiocese: Greek Orthodox Archdiocese of America

Clergy
- Priest: Father Andreas Vithoulkas

The St. Nicholas Greek Orthodox Church, officially the St. Nicholas Greek Orthodox Church and National Shrine, is a church and shrine in the World Trade Center in Lower Manhattan, New York City. It is administered by the Greek Orthodox Archdiocese of America and has been developed by the Port Authority of New York and New Jersey, based upon a design by Spanish architect Santiago Calatrava. The church was consecrated on July 4, 2022.

St. Nicholas replaced the original church of the same name that was destroyed during the September 11 attacks in 2001—the only house of worship, and only building outside the original World Trade Center complex, to be completely destroyed. (Note: The adjacent Deutsche Bank Building and nearby Fiterman Hall were later demolished due to severe damage and contamination) The new church is located in Liberty Park, overlooking the National September 11 Memorial & Museum. Its architecture draws from Byzantine influences, namely the Church of the Savior and the Hagia Sophia in Istanbul, as well as from the Parthenon in Athens. In addition to serving as a Greek Orthodox parish, St. Nicholas acts as a "House of Prayer for all people" that functions as a national shrine and community center, incorporating a secular bereavement space, social hall, and various educational and interfaith programs.

Initially scheduled to open in 2016, St. Nicholas' rebuilding effort was beset by delays, cost overruns, and claims of financial impropriety. In 2019, the nonprofit Friends of St. Nicholas was founded to help complete the project, which continued under the auspices of the newly elected Archbishop Elpidophoros. The church was partially opened for a memorial service commemorating the 20th anniversary of the September 11 attacks. The church fully opened on December 6, 2022, the Feast of Saint Nicholas.

== History ==
External image
- Interior of the original church

Greek immigrants who had passed through Ellis Island founded the congregation of St. Nicholas Greek Orthodox Church in 1916, naming it for Saint Nicholas, the patron saint of sailors and travelers. Parishioners initially worshiped in the dining room of a hotel on Morris Street owned by Stamatis Kalamarides. In 1919, five families raised $25,000 to purchase a new location for the church, a three-story tavern at 155 Cedar Street that was originally built in the 1830s as a private home. The modest structure was converted into a church and given a fourth story, holding worship services by 1922.

St. Nicholas was only 22 feet (6.7 m) wide, 56 feet (17 m) long, and 35 feet (11 m) tall. It was originally an old calendar church, but in 1993 began holding Wednesday services according to the Gregorian calendar. It was notable for its small size and its unusual location, where it was juxtaposed with the large modern skyscrapers in the area. All of the other adjacent buildings had been demolished, leaving the church surrounded on three sides by a parking lot.

Before the September 11 attacks, the church had a dedicated congregation of about 70 families led by Father John Romas. On Wednesdays, the building was open to the public, often receiving visitors who were not Greek Orthodox. In addition to local residents and Greek immigrants, St. Nicholas attracted Greek shipping magnates passing through New York City.

== September 11, 2001 ==
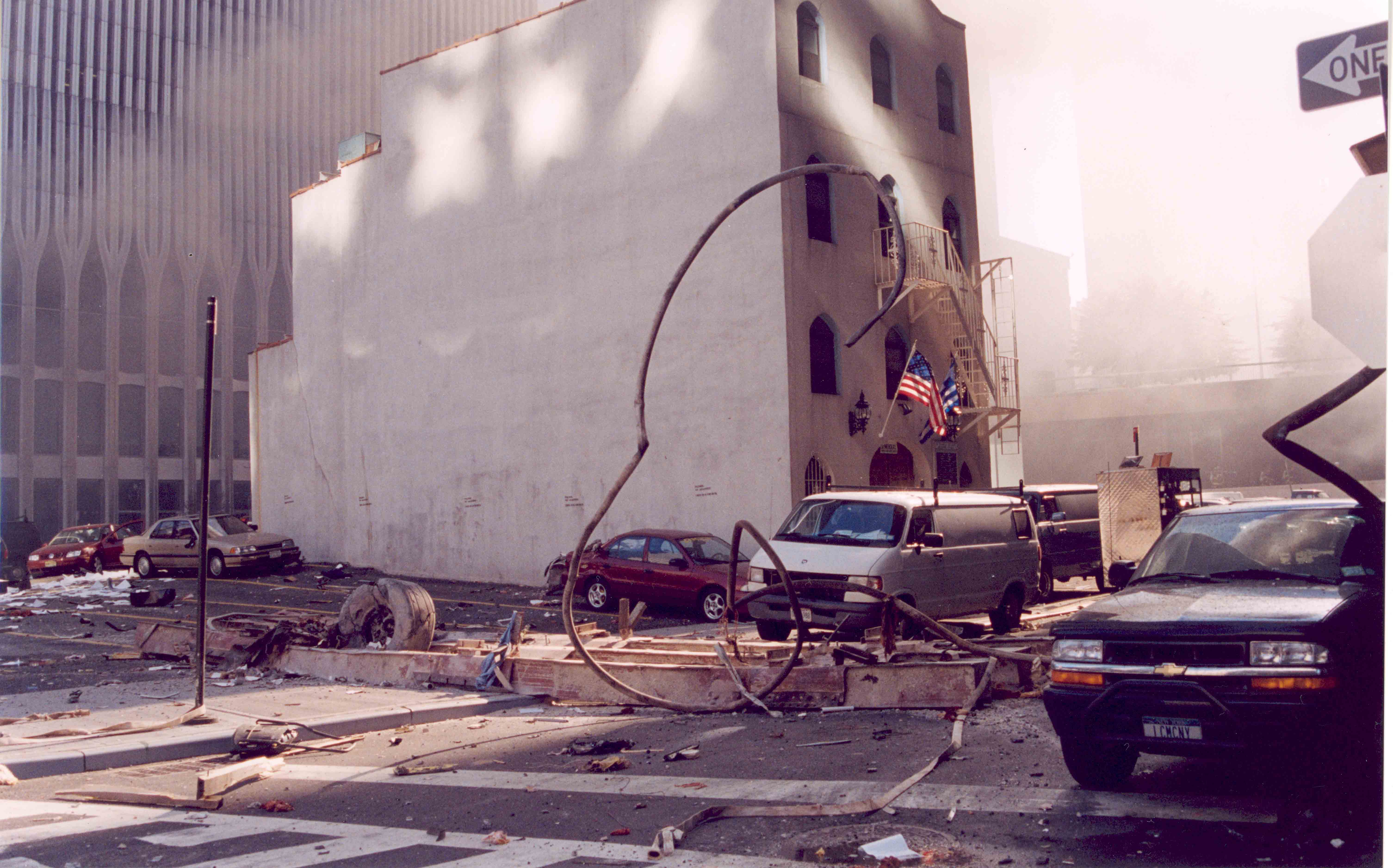
The original church right before it was crushed by the falling South Tower

The building was completely destroyed when the South Tower of the original World Trade Center collapsed, after being struck by United Airlines Flight 175 during the September 11 attacks. No one was inside when the church was destroyed; the church sexton and an electrician were able to escape only minutes before.

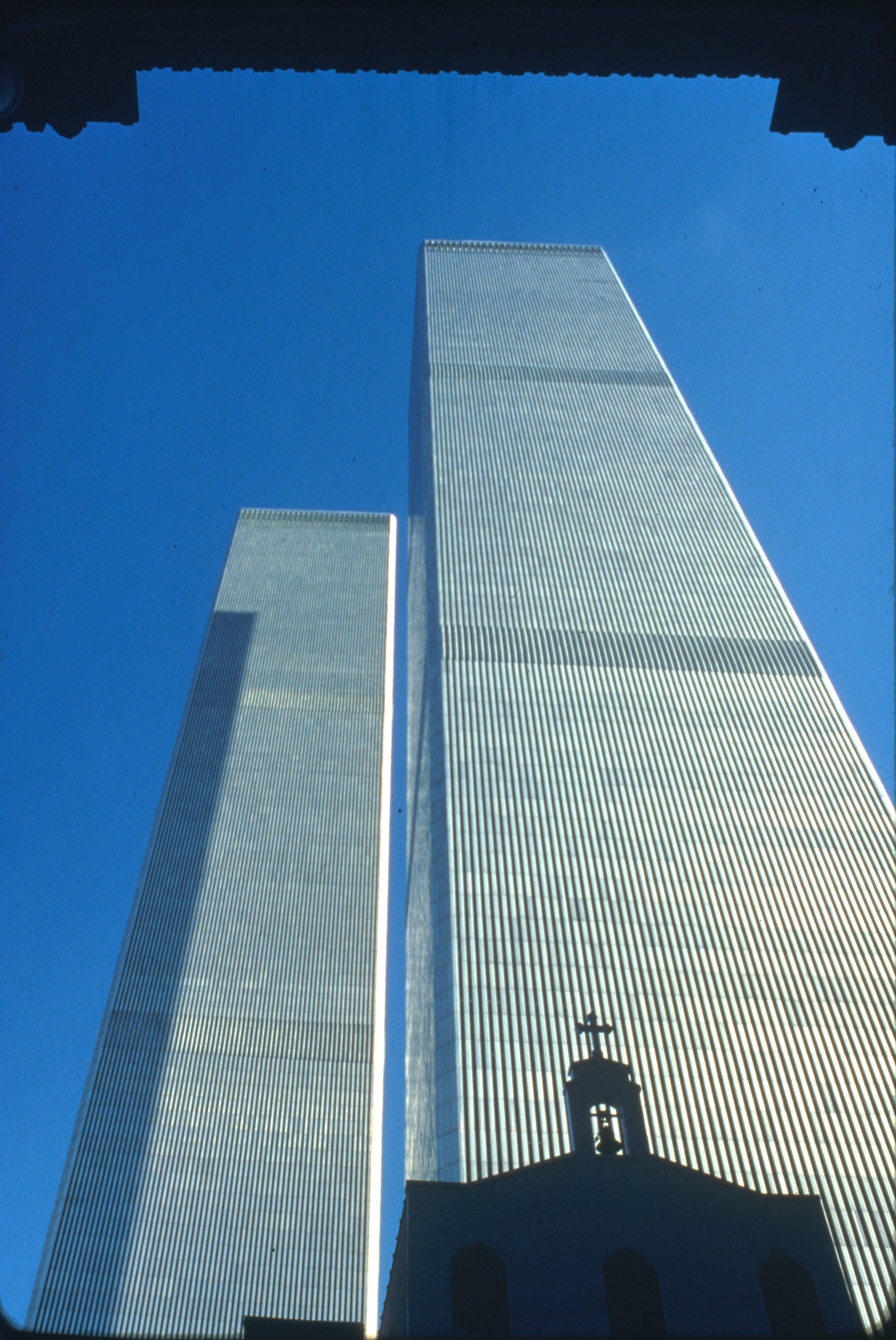
View of WTC from below with St. Nicholas Greek Orthodox Church in foreground, 1976

A 50-year-old parishioner named Bill Tarazonas, who was in the church that morning shortly before the South Tower collapsed, later said:

The first thing I saw was the landing gear of the plane along the right side of the church ... I saw a pickup truck slashed in half like a tomato. ... On the top of the roof was human remains. Bones ... lying all over the place ... I was numb. ... I guess St. Nicholas gave me the push, the courage, to get out of there. I started running and running.

Very little of the church's contents were recovered. Among the most valuable physical possessions lost were some relics of St Nicholas, St Catherine, and St Sava, which had been donated to the church by Nicholas II, the last tsar of Russia; they were removed from their safe on holy days for veneration. Archbishop Demetrios expressed that having the saints' relics intermingled with the remains of the attack's victims served to sanctify the site further. Among the items eventually found were the damaged icons of St. Dionysios of Zakynthos, the Life-giving Spring (Ancient Greek: Ζωοδόχος Πηγή, romanized: Zōodóchos Pēgḗ), and a handful of miscellaneous religious items. These are to be displayed in an exhibit in the new church dedicated to its predecessor.

== Rebuilding ==
Congregation members and Father Romas temporarily relocated to Sts. Constantine and Helen Greek Orthodox Cathedral in Brooklyn. (Note: Rev. Father John Romas labored tirelessly for the rebuilding of the church and anxiously awaited its completion, however he died on Sunday, January 24, 2016.)

On December 6, 2001, the Feast Day of St. Nicholas, Archbishop Demetrios of America, joined by Archbishop Iakovos and area clergy, celebrated a somber vespers and memorial service near the location where the church once stood.

Following its collapse, donations of almost $2 million were received, as well as additional pledges of construction materials and appointments for the complete rebuilding of the church. The city of Bari, Italy, where the relics of Saint Nicholas were originally bestowed, donated $500,000. The Government of Greece contributed $750,000 to these efforts, and the Ecumenical Patriarchate of Constantinople gave $50,000. (Note: Some of the donors that contributed immediately after 9/11 included: The American Jewish Committee; Roman Catholic Archbishop of Boston; The Episcopal Church of the Divine Love; Auburn Community Church; The Diocesan Missionary and Church Extension Society; Ecumenical Patriarchate; United Association Emergency Relief Fund; Archdiocese of Our Lady of Guadalupe, Inc.; Catholic Charities of the Diocese of Albany; Union of Greek Shipowners; Independent Fiduciary Services, Inc.; Bank of Greece/ Fotios K. Koutras; Tsakos Shipping & Trading S.A/ Macedonia House; Greek Congress; Embassy of the State of Qatar; AHEPA Charitable Foundation; Permanent Mission of Cyprus to the United Nations; Connecticut Rivers Council; Upper NY State Jr. Federation Organization Christians of America; Commercial Bank of Greece/Mayor Avramopoulos of Athens; Houston International Seaman's Center/Argiros; Alpha Bank of Greece/ Mayor Avramopoulos of Athens; St. Mary's Russian Orthodox Greek Catholic Church; Banca Nazionale Decomune Di Bari.)

Meanwhile, the plans for rebuilding the World Trade Center complex included building a new St. Nicholas Greek Orthodox Church quite close to the original location, on the elevated Liberty Park, diagonally from One World Trade Center.

=== 2008–2011: plans and deal breakdown ===
On July 23, 2008, the Port Authority of New York and New Jersey reached a deal with the leaders of the church for the Port Authority to acquire the 1,200-square-foot (110 m^{2}) lot that the church had occupied for $20 million; $10 million came from the Port Authority and $10 million from JPMorgan Chase & Co. Under the terms of the deal, the Port Authority would grant land and up to $20 million to help rebuild the church in a new location – in addition, the authority was willing to pay up to $40 million to construct a bomb-proof platform underneath it.

In March 2009, the Port Authority stated that it had stopped talking with the church and had canceled building St. Nicholas altogether. The Port Authority said that the church was asking for too much, and that they might delay the whole World Trade Center project. The Archdiocese, however, said that they just wanted the church back, and a third of the building would be a memorial for 9/11, a place where people of all faiths could pray and remember those who died in the attacks.

In July 2010, George Demos, a former SEC attorney and Republican Congressional candidate, first brought the failure to rebuild St. Nicholas Church into the national debate. Demos said that the executive director of the Port Authority, Chris Ward, had not made rebuilding St. Nicholas church a top priority. On August 16, 2010, Demos launched a petition on his website calling on the Port Authority to rebuild the church, calling the Port Authority "disingenuous and disrespectful". On August 23, 2010, former New York Governor George Pataki joined George Demos at a press conference to call on the Port Authority to reopen talk with officials from the Church.

During the vespers service held on December 5, 2010, Archbishop Demetrios said the Greek Orthodox Archdiocese would do anything to rebuild the church.

On February 14, 2011, the Greek Orthodox Archdiocese of America filed a $20 million lawsuit against the Port Authority pursuant to Section 1983 of the Civil Rights Act (42 U.S.C. § 1983), requesting a grand jury trial for not rebuilding the church.

=== 2011: agreement to rebuild ===
As a result of settlement discussions mediated by the Governor of New York's office, the Port Authority and Archdiocese agreed to an independent engineering study to determine the feasibility of siting the Church at various locations in Liberty Park. The four-month study was led by construction expert Peter Lehrer, who worked on the project on a pro bono basis with Director of World Trade Center Construction Steven Plate and independent engineers Gorton & Partners and McNamara/Salvia, Inc. The study concluded that structural issues could be resolved to site the Church at 130 Liberty Street at significantly lower cost than originally agreed, and with no delay to construction at the World Trade Center site.

On October 14, 2011, ten years after the church was destroyed, an agreement for the reconstruction of the church was signed that ended all legal action. Governor Andrew Cuomo, Archbishop Demetrios, and Christopher O. Ward, the executive director of the Port Authority of New York and New Jersey, announced that the new church would be constructed at the intersection of Liberty and Greenwich Streets in Liberty Park, exactly where it had been envisioned three years before. However, the church would be located on a plot of 4,100 square feet, about two-thirds the size of the site in the earlier proposed plan of 2008. It would also include an adjacent nondenominational bereavement center.

The new site at 130 Liberty Street was less than 50 yards east of the church's original site at 155 Cedar Street, but more than three times larger. The new church would be rebuilt on Port Authority land, on a platform above the helical underground ramp of the Vehicular Security Center, which houses the loading and parking areas of the new World Trade Center. The Port Authority estimated that it would spend about $25 million to construct the platform on which St. Nicholas will sit and provide the necessary utility hookups, while the church would pay for anything built above ground. Archbishop Demetrios stated that "our pledge is to be a witness for all New Yorkers, that freedom of conscience and the fundamental human right of free religious expression will always shine forth in the resurrected St. Nicholas Church."

=== 2014–2017: construction and further fundraising ===
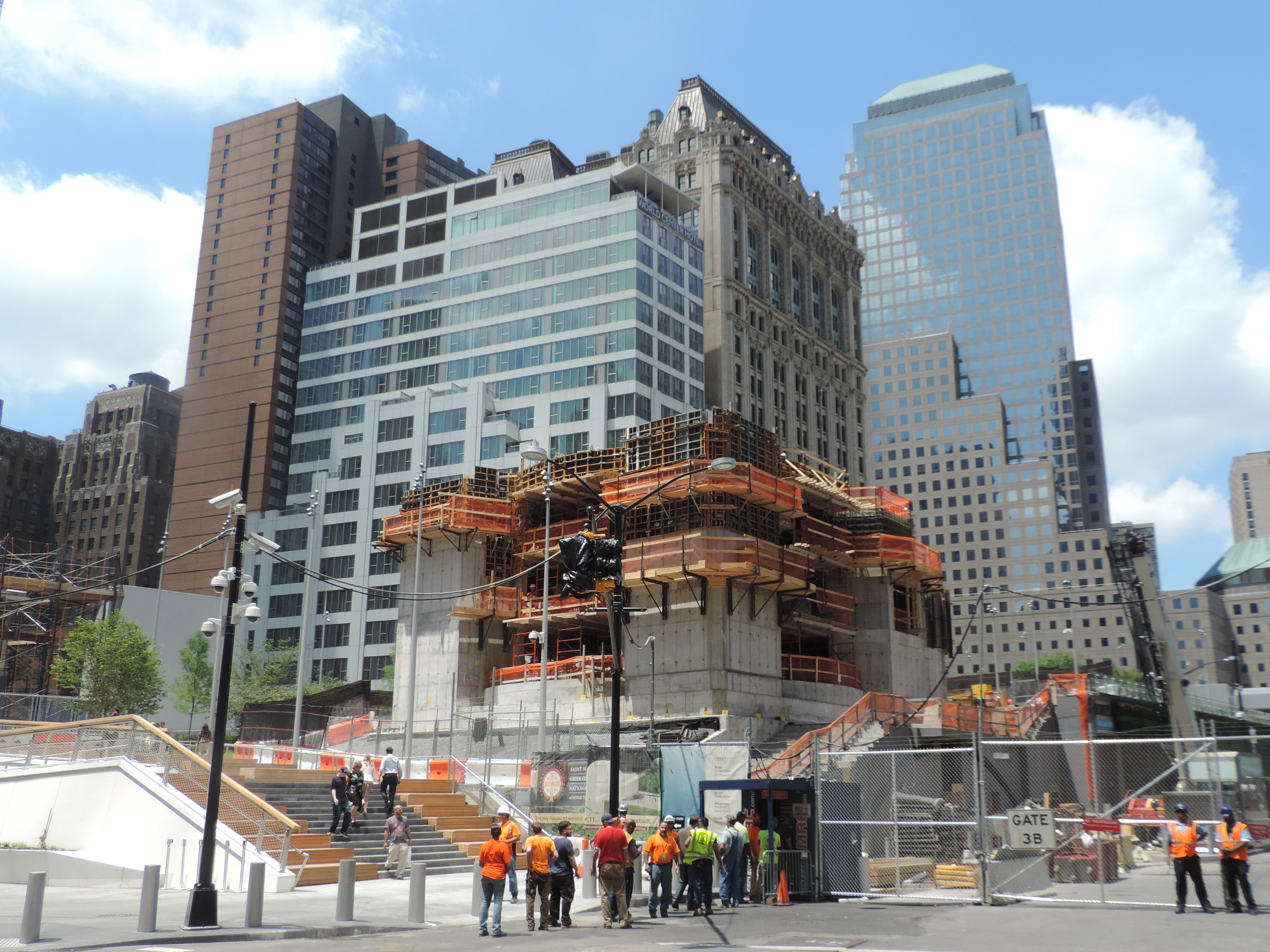
Construction progress seen in June 2016

Spanish architect Santiago Calatrava was awarded the task of designing the new St. Nicholas; he has referred to the church as a "human-scaled presence in an ensemble of giants." The building takes the form of a circular domed church flanked by four towers, referencing the great Byzantine churches of Hagia Sophia and the Church of the Holy Savior in Chora, both in Istanbul. According to Calatrava, who consulted Archbishop Demetrios with regard to the liturgical and iconographical requirements of the interior, the church would be built of steel and concrete, but the exterior would be clad in stone using a double-wall construction method. The outer wall features thin slabs of Pentelic marble illuminated by LED lights on a nightly basis. While the layout of the interior follows a traditional Greek Orthodox pattern, St. Nicholas functions as an open, pluralistic communal gathering space accessible to the public on a regular basis, in addition to its role as a place of worship.

The ground blessing ceremony and symbolic laying of the cornerstone took place on October 18, 2014, attended by government and church leaders, with construction expected to be completed within two years. In September 2015 a live webcam showing the church's construction was made available.

In 2015, AHEPA chapters from across the country launched fundraising efforts hoping to raise at least $500,000 over the following two years toward the estimated $38 million project, combining contributions with private gifts and donations from the 525 parishes within the Greek Orthodox Archdiocese of America. In the spring of 2016, it was announced that proceeds totaling $100,000 from the liquidation of the assets of St. Nicholas Church in Appleton, Wisconsin would be donated to the rebuilding of St. Nicholas Church and Shrine. The parish would be denoted as a benefactor, and a video history of their church would be present at the new St. Nicholas National Shrine. In September 2016, the Stavros Niarchos Foundation donated 5 million dollars for the rebuilding of Saint Nicholas at the WTC.

On November 29, 2016, the church structure was ceremoniously topped out with a temporary cross, to be replaced with a permanent cross upon completion of the church dome.

On August 21, 2017, the St. Nicholas Greek Orthodox Church signed a formal lease and purchase agreement with the Port Authority for what is to be known as The Saint Nicholas National Shrine at the World Trade Center. The final deal was signed by Rick Cotton, the Port's new executive director, just days after he took on the role. The 198-year lease runs until July 31, 2215, and has an additional 99-year extension, as well as an option to buy the land from the Port Authority at any time during the term of the lease for a nominal [i.e., $1] purchase price.

=== 2017–2021: cessation and resumption of work ===
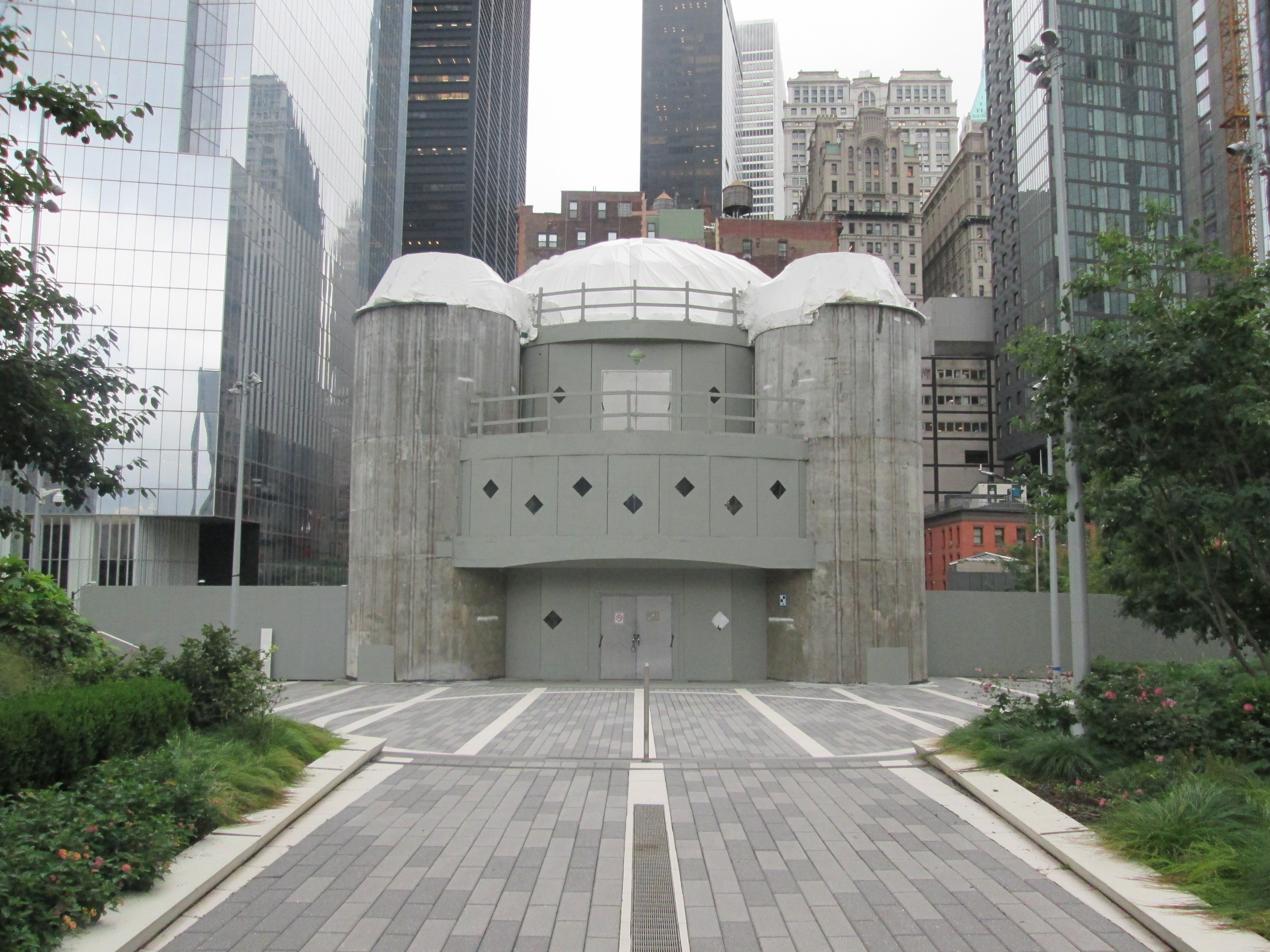
Construction progress, September 2018

The church was expected to re-open in November 2018. However, in December 2017, Skanska U.S.A., the construction company rebuilding the Santiago Calatrava-designed shrine, ceased work at the site in Liberty Park. The Greek Orthodox Archdiocese of America had been unable to pay Skanska's bills, despite receiving $37 million in donations for the shrine. According to a December 2017 newsletter, $48,991,760 had been pledged to date, while of that amount $37,398,316 had been collected, leaving a pledge balance of just over $11 million. Following the cessation of work, the US Attorney's Office in Manhattan as well as the state Attorney General's Office opened probes into the project's finances and those of the Greek Orthodox Archdiocese of America.

On May 16, 2018, the Greek Orthodox Archdiocese of America released the results of Phase I of a PricewaterhouseCoopers investigative report regarding the rebuilding of Saint Nicholas Greek Orthodox Church and National Shrine (SNCNS). The report concluded that as of December 31, 2017, the Archdiocese owed the SNCNS an aggregate of $3,504,550, excluding interest. On May 2, 2018, the Archdiocese made a $1,000,000 payment to the SNCNS thereby reducing the balance due to $2,504,550.

In July 2018 the Archdiocese closed a deal with Alma Bank for a 10-year, $5.5-million mortgage to restore monies to the unfinished St. Nicholas Greek Orthodox Church and National Shrine at Liberty Park, however the fresh funding was not expected to be enough to complete the project, whose cost had ballooned to $80 million.

On October 16, 2018, the Special Investigative Committee (SIC) released Phase II of the PricewaterhouseCoopers investigative report to the Archdiocese, along with a summary communication based on the report. It concluded that there was no evidence that St. Nicholas funds were improperly paid to any individuals employed by or associated with the Archdiocese, and no evidence or allegation that fraud was committed in connection with the St. Nicholas project. Rather, the cost overruns appear to have been the result of change orders agreed to by Archdiocese decision-makers to address architectural concerns or enhance the design of SNCNS. In addition, the Special Investigative Committee recommended that the St. Nicholas rebuilding effort be spearheaded by a new legal entity, the "Friends of St. Nicholas," which could be affiliated with, but would be independent from the Archdiocese, with separate bank accounts and an appropriately qualified board to do the fund-raising and oversee the project.

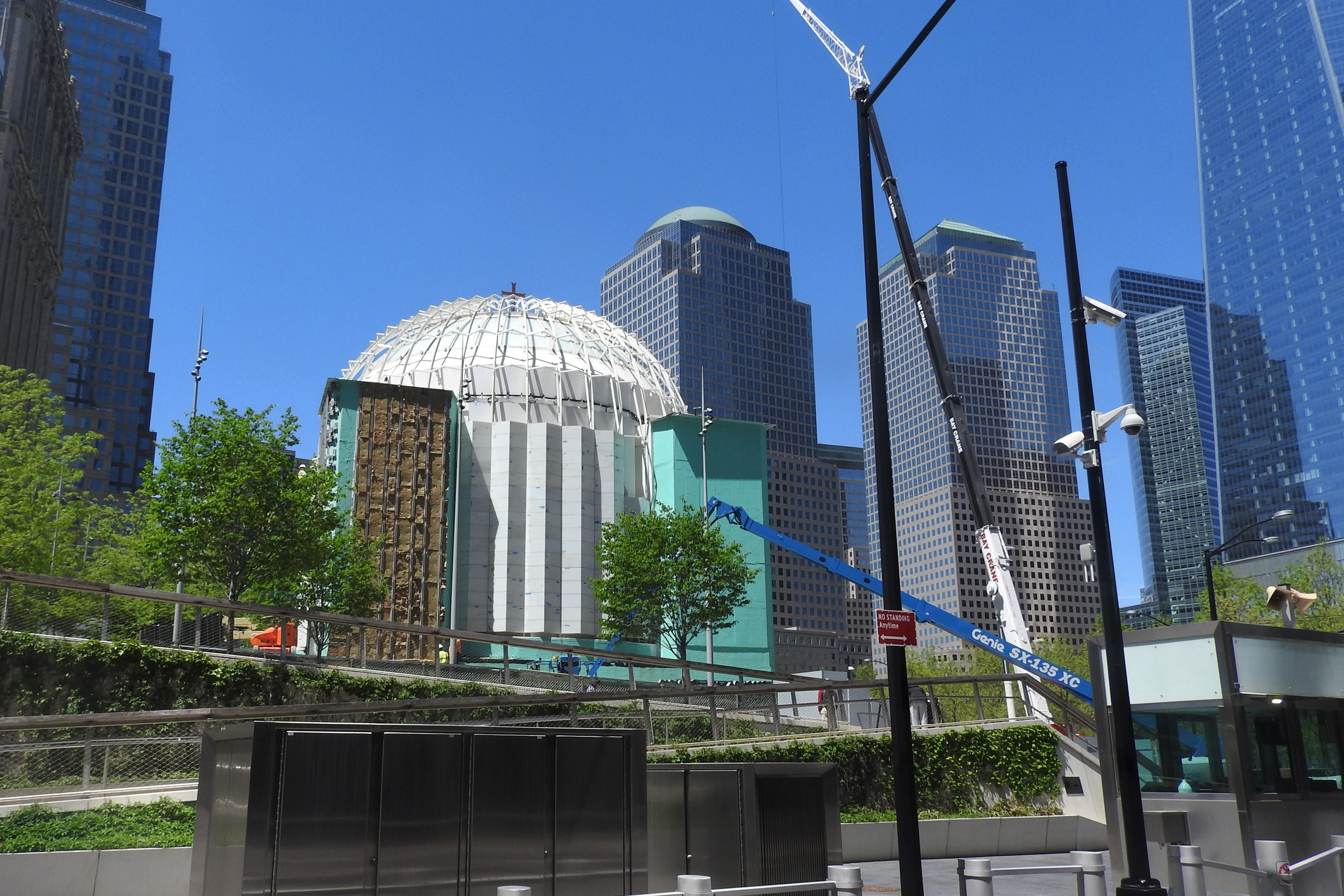
Construction progress, May 2021

In April 2019, reports from New York Governor Andrew Cuomo's office said that he had assembled a team of seven millionaire and billionaire donors committed to putting up the money to complete the project. A keynote address of Archbishop Elpidophoros of America on October 17, 2019, stated that the building of the Church should re-commence immediately with the opening of the doors scheduled by September 11, 2021, the 20th anniversary of the September 11 attacks, as a tribute to those who perished, as well as a lead off to the centenary year of the Greek Orthodox Archdiocese of America. New York officials and the Port Authority estimated that the rebuilt church would be the most visited church in the United States.

Fundraising and the resumption of the work was slated to start by January 2020. A nonprofit group formed in January 2020 raised $41.5 million for construction within eight months. However, this work was paused due to a general construction hiatus caused by the COVID-19 pandemic in New York City. On August 3, 2020, Governor Cuomo and Archbishop Elpidophoros attended a ceremony that was held to officially resume construction. The marble facade was installed in February 2021.

=== 2022: opening ===
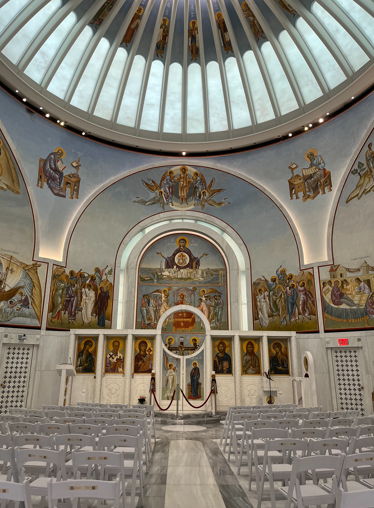
Interior of the church in June 2024

The St. Nicholas Greek Orthodox Church and National Shrine was officially consecrated on July 4, 2022. The consecration was celebrated jointly by Archbishop Elpidophoros Lambriniadis, Metropolitan Nicholas Pissare of Detroit, and Metropolitan Savas Zembillas of Pittsburgh. The consecrated altar was signed by all of the Greek Orthodox Archdiocese hierarchs who were present, as well as by the two living former Archbishops of America — Spyridon Papageorge and Demetrios Trakatellis, including Protopresbyter Alexander Karloutsos, together with Metropolitan Emmanuel Adamakis (el) of Chalcedon and Metropolitan Prodromos Xenakes (el) of Rethymnon, Crete, who were representing the Patriarchate of Constantinople. The church fully opened for regular services on December 6, 2022, the Feast of Saint Nicholas.

Architecture critic Justin Davidson wrote for Curbed that the new church was "a refined pocket project", especially as compared with the much larger World Trade Center Transportation Hub, also designed by Santiago Calatrava. Davidson said, "The dense white nugget of St. Nicholas Greek Orthodox Church presides over the memorial plaza from a raised platform at the southern end, and it suggests that maybe Calatrava was always a religious architect disguised as a transportation engineer."
