= Greek Orthodox Archdiocese of Canada =

Eastern Orthodox Church archdiocese

Greek Orthodox Archdiocese of Canada Ελληνική Ορθόδοξη Αρχιεπισκοπή Καναδά

orthodox
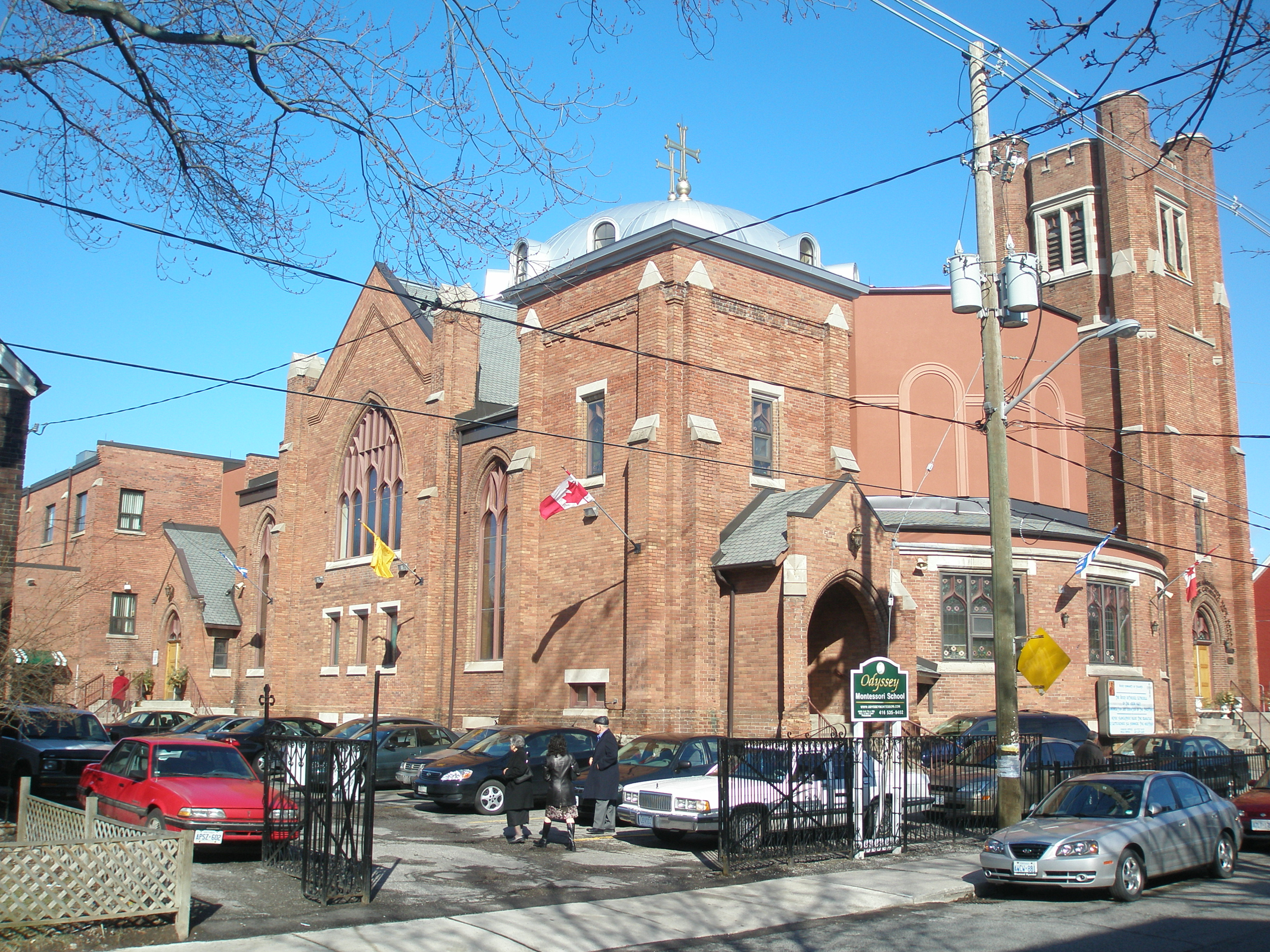
- Annunciation Of The Virgin Mary Greek Orthodox Cathedral, Toronto

Location
- Country: Canada
- Headquarters: 86 Overlea Boulevard, Toronto
- Coordinates: 43°42′32″N 79°20′22″W

Statistics
- Parishes: 75
- Members: 220,000

Information
- Denomination: Eastern Orthodox
- Rite: Byzantine Rite
- Established: 1960: Ninth Archdiocesan District of GOARCH; 1996: Metropolis of Toronto (Canada); 2019: Archdiocese of Canada
- Cathedral: Annunciation of The Virgin Mary Greek Orthodox Cathedral, Toronto.
- Language: Greek, English
- Parent church: Ecumenical Patriarchate of Constantinople
- Patriarch: Bartholomew I of Constantinople
- Metropolitan Archbishop: Archbishop Apostolos (Koufallakis)

Website
- goarchdiocese.ca

The Greek Orthodox Archdiocese of Canada, formerly known as the Greek Orthodox Metropolis of Toronto (Canada), is an archdiocese of the Eastern Orthodox Church based in Canada. It is under the jurisdiction of the Ecumenical Patriarchate of Constantinople. The present Archbishop and Exarch of All Canada is Sotirios Athanassoulas. Its jurisdiction covers members of the Greek Orthodox community living in Canada. The headquarters of the archdiocese is in the East York district of Toronto.

== History ==
At the beginning of the 20th century there were approximately 300 Canadians of Greek descent. The first community was established in Montreal in 1906. This was followed in 1909 by the community of "St. George" in Toronto. Other early communities were established in Winnipeg (1912) and in Thunder Bay (1918).

As these communities began forming parishes, the Greek believers looked the Church of Greece for priests. Responding to the calls from the New World, in 1908, the Patriarchate in Constantinople issued a decree giving episcopal oversight of the Americas to the Church of Greece. In 1922, Meletius, now Patriarch of Constantinople, revoked the decree of 1908, and formally organized the Greek Orthodox Archdiocese of North and South America on 11 May 1922 and appointed Bp. Alexander, the titular Bishop of Rodostolou, as his Patriarchal Exarch in America. More communities were established in Vancouver (1927), in Ottawa (1929) and in Edmonton in (1938). At this time, all parishes in the Americas were part of the Greek Orthodox Archdiocese of North and South America. In 1960, the Metropolis of Toronto became the Ninth Archdiocesan District of Greek Orthodox Archdiocese of North and South America.

The first Bishop in Canada, Metropolitan Athenagoras of Elaia, was appointed by the Ecumenical Patriarch Athenagoras in 1960 and was followed by Bishop Timothy of Rodostolon 1963-1967 and Bishop Theodosios of Ancona 1967-1973.

The present Metropolitan of the Greek Orthodox Metropolis of Toronto (Canada), Sotirios, was elected Bishop of Constantia on 18 December 1973 and ordained on 27 January 1974. Since then, he is serving the Church in Canada. He was promoted to Bishop of Toronto in 1979 and Metropolitan of Toronto in 1996.

At the time of his election as Bishop, there were only 22 Churches in Canada. Under his tenure, that number has grown to 76 Churches and 350,000 Greek Orthodox Christians. During his Archieratical service, the Diocese and now Metropolis have established the Annual Youth Assemblies (1980); a monthly newspaper, Orthodox Way (1982); Social Services (1984); Metahomes (1984), providing transitional housing for the homeless; Greek Orthodox Order of Canada (1987); weekly television program Orthodox Voice (1990), which is broadcast across all of Canada; School of Byzantine Music (1991); Convents of St. Kosmas of Aitolos in Ontario and the Virgin Mary of Consolation in Quebec (1993); Greek Orthodox Education in Ontario, (1996) ("Metamorphosis" Greek Orthodox Day School, "Metamorphosis" Child Care Centre, Toronto, Metamorphosis Preschool, Toronto, "St. Nicholas" Child Care Centre-Toronto). Homes for the Aged, (nine Homes: Toronto, Montreal, Laval, Vancouver); 50 Homes for Needy Families (Thunder Bay); Toronto Orthodox Theological Academy (1998); "Metamorphosis" Summer Camps (1999); Metropolis Cultural Centre (2002).

In 1996, the Greek Orthodox Archdiocese of North and South America was split by the Ecumenical Patriarchate, into four parts: Greek Orthodox Metropolis of Canada, Central America, South America and the America which was left with the territory of the United States of America. As stated earlier, on 24 September 1996, Sotirios was elevated to the rank of "Metropolitan Archbishop of Toronto and Exarch of all Canada".

On 13 June 2019, the Holy Synod of the Ecumenical Patriarchate in its meeting with His All Holiness Patriarch Bartholomew presiding elevated the Metropolis of Toronto to the Archdiocese of Canada and, consequently, its Metropolitan to Archbishop Sotirios of Canada.

Following the resignation of Archbishop Sotirios in 2026, the Holy Synod of the Ecumenical Patriarchate elected Metropolitan Apostolos of New Jersey to succeed the office."Metropolitan Apostolos of New Jersey Elected Archbishop of Canada". Pappas Post. His enthronement is scheduled to take place on September 19, 2026.

== Parishes, monasteries, and academies ==
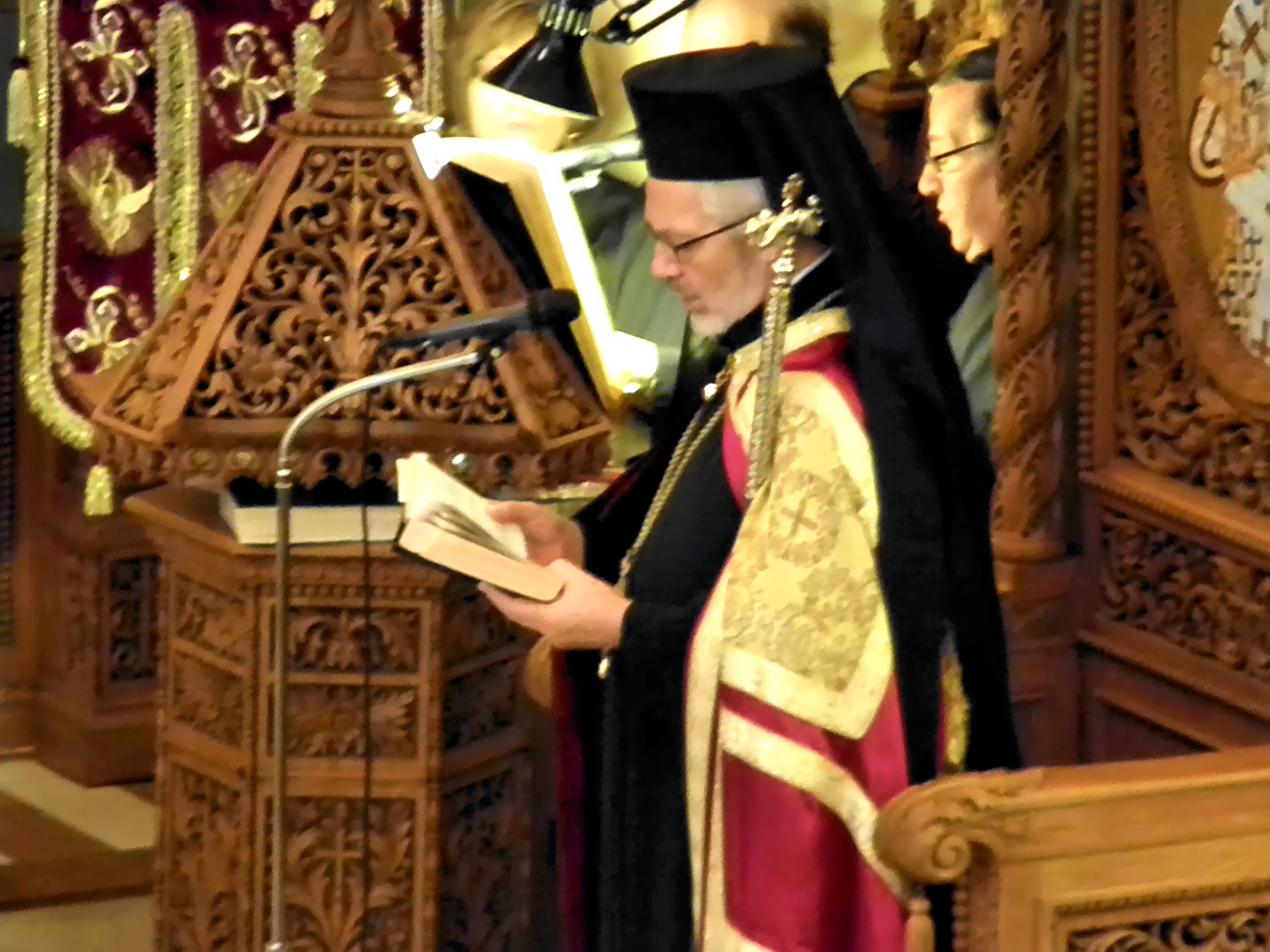
Archbishop Sotirios

As of 2020 there are 75 parishes in Canada. They are organised into four regions:

- Atlantic Canada (4 parishes)
- Ontario (39 parishes)
- Quebec (13 parishes)
- Western Canada (19 parishes)

There are two monasteries in the metropolis. In 1993, the Convents of St. Kosmas of Aitolos in Ontario, and the Virgin Mary of Consolation in Quebec were established.

The Patriarchal Toronto Orthodox Theological Academy is run by the archdiocese, and located in Toronto, Canada. It and was founded in 1998, and as of 2024 has graduated 63 students and ordained 37 priests in its history.

== Episcopacy ==
- Archbishop Apostolos (Koufallakis) (2026–present)
- Archbishop Sotirios (Athanassoulas) of Canada and Exarch of the Arctic (1973–2026)

=== Auxiliary bishops ===
- Bishop Bartholomew (Mostratos) of Keramos (July 2020 – present)
- Bishop Athenagoras (Salmas) of Patara (July 2020 – present)
- Bishop Iakovos (Antonopoulos) of Zenoupolis (July 2020 – March 2024)

=== Deceased hierarchs ===
- Bishop Christophoros (Rakintzakis) of Andida, vicar bishop (1999-2017)
- Archbishop Iakovos (Coucouzis) of North and South America (1959-1996)

- Bishop Theodosios (Sideris) of Ancona, GOA Ninth (Canadian) District (1967-1973)
- Bishop Timotheos (Haloftis) of Rodostolou, GOA Ninth (Canadian) District (1963-1967)
- Metropolitan Athenagoras (Kokkinakis) of Elaia, GOA Ninth (Canadian) District (1960-1963)

- Archbishop Michael (Konstantinides) of North and South America (1949-1958)
- Archbishop Athenagoras (Spyrou) of North and South America (1931-1948)
- Archbishop Alexander (Demoglou), the first Greek Orthodox Archbishop of North and South America (1922-1930)

== See also ==
- Assembly of Canonical Orthodox Bishops of Canada
