= Apostolos Koufallakis =

Greek-American Orthodox bishop

His Eminence Apostolos
- Greek Orthodox Archbishop of Canada
- Archdiocese: Greek Orthodox Archdiocese of Canada (2026–present)
- Elected: July 22, 2026
- Installed: September 19, 2026
- Predecessor: Sotirios (Athanassoulas)
- Successor: Incumbent
- Other post: Bishop of Medeia (2014–2023)
- Previous post: Metropolitan of New Jersey (2023–2026)

Personal details
- Born: Εὐάγγελος Κουφαλάκης; 1969 (age 56–57) Rhodes, Greece
- Denomination: Eastern Orthodox
- Education: Ecclesiastical School of Patmos; University of Thessaloniki; Boston University (STM)

Archbishop Apostolos Koufallakis (Greek: Ἀποστόλος Κουφαλάκης), secular name Evangelos Koufallakis (Greek: Εὐάγγελος Κουφαλάκης; born 1969) is the Archbishop of Canada. He previously served as Metropolitan of New Jersey from 2023 to 2026.

== Early life ==
Koufallakis was born Evangelos on the island of Rhodes in 1969 to Ioannis and Stergia Koufallakis, the second of four children. In 1990, he was accepted into the Ecclesiastical School of Patmos where he studied Orthodox Byzantine Music and Hymnology, and was tonsured a monk in 1993. He was ordained as a deacon in June 20 of that same year, where he served as deacon to the Metropolitan of Rhodes until 1995 when he was accepted into the University of Thessaloniki. On July 28, 1996 he was ordained as a priest, and in 2000 he graduated with a Master of Divinity.

== Life in America ==
He first arrived in America in 2001, and was accepted into Boston University the following year, conferring him a Master of Sacred Theology in 2004. From 2004 to 2008 he served as dean of the Cathedral of St. Demetrios in Astoria, New York, and received the Citation of Honor for his "profound devotion to the Greek Orthodox Church and to the Greek American Community" during the Greek Independence day celebrations on March 20, 2008.

In March 2009, he was appointed director of the Archdiocesan Hellenic Cultural Center in Astoria, NY until November 2011 when he was moved to the Chancellor of the Metropolis of San Francisco under Metropolitan Gerasimos. On November 28, 2014 he was elevated to rank of auxiliary bishop and given the title of Bishop of Medeia. He also was appointed as Chief Secretary of the Holy Eparchial Synod of the Greek Orthodox Archdiocese of America in 2018 and Spiritual Advisor of the Greek Orthodox Ladies Philoptochos Society in 2019. Koufallakis was also tasked with planning of the ceremony of the enthronement of Archbishop Elpidophoros which took place on June 22, 2019.

On February 3, 2021 Koufallakis was assigned liturgical and administrative responsibilities of the Diocese of New Jersey after the dethronement of its Metropolitan, Evangelos Kourounis. He celebrated the first liturgy at St. Nicholas Greek Orthodox Church since 9/11 on December 6, 2022. On July 24, 2023 he was elected to the restored Diocese of New Jersey and enthroned on September 16 of that year. He was also appointed member of the Holy Synod of the Phanar that same month.

== Archbishop of Canada ==
On July 22, 2026, Apostolos was elected Archbishop of Canada, leader of the Greek Orthodox Archdiocese of Canada, replacing the retiring Archbishop Sotirios. His enthronement is scheduled for September 19. On Saturday, September 19, 2026, Apostolos was enthroned by Archbishop Nikitas of Thyateira and Great Britain as the new Greek Orthodox Archbishop of Canada at St. Nicholas Greek Orthodox Cathedral in Scarborough, Toronto, Ontario.

Eastern Orthodox Church titles
Preceded by Evangelos (Kourounis)	Metropolitan of New Jersey; 2023 - 2026	Succeeded by Vacant
Preceded by Sotirios (Athanassoulas)	Archbishop of Canada; 2026 - Present	Succeeded by Incumbent
