= Kourounis =

Kourounis (Greek: Κορούνης) is a Greek surname. Notable people with the surname include:

- Evangelos Kourounis (born 1961), Greek Orthodox bishop
- George Kourounis (born 1970), Canadian explorer and storm chaser
