= Evangelos Kourounis =

Greek-American Orthodox bishop

His Eminence Evangelos
- Metropolitan of Sardis
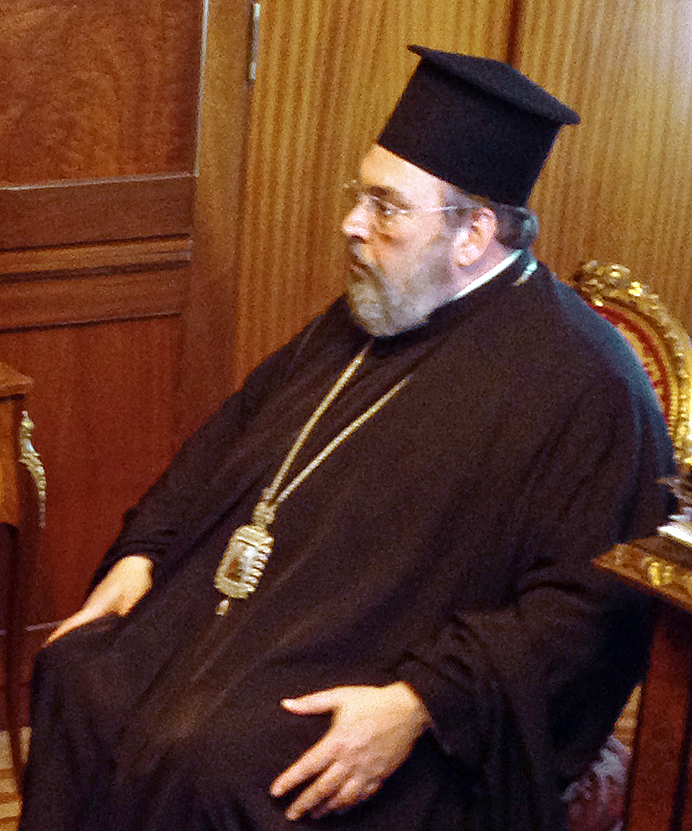
- Evangelos in 2013
- Archdiocese: Greek Orthodox Archdiocese of America
- Elected: April 12, 2003
- Installed: May 16, 2003
- Term ended: October 8, 2020
- Predecessor: George (Papaioannou)
- Successor: Apostolos (Koufallakis)
- Other post: Metropolitan of Sardis

Personal details
- Born: September 20, 1961 (age 65) New York City, New York
- Denomination: Eastern Orthodox
- Education: Hellenic College Holy Cross; University of Geneva

Metropolitan Evangelos Korounis, (Greek: Ευάγγελος Κορούνης; born September 20, 1961) is a Greek Orthodox bishop, metropolitan of Sardis and former metropolitan of New Jersey until his dethronement in 2020.

== Early life and education ==
Kournis was born to John and Magdalene and two brothers in 1961 in New York City. In 1983 he graduated from the Hellenic College in Boston, and in 1986 he obtained a Masters in Divinity from the same university. From 1987 to 1988 he lived in Geneva, Switzerland when he was ordained into the deaconate in February 1, 1987. While in Switzerland he also served as deacon to Archbishop Iakovos in a variety of roles, and also obtained a Certificate of Ecumenical Studies from the University of Geneva. On July 30, 1989, he was ordained into the priesthood and relocated to Astoria, New York in order to serve as assistant priest to the Dean of St. Demetrios Cathedral. While in New Jersey he served a variety of administrative and assistant roles across various positions, such as Director of the Registry and Chancellor of the Diocese of New Jersey, and President of the Spiritual Court for the Archdiocesan District.

== Metropolitan ==
On April 12, 2003 he was elected as Metropolitan of New Jersey and enthroned on May 16, 2003. The position had been vacant since the sudden passing of its previous bishop, George Papaioannou, in 1999.

In October 2013 he was involved in a dispute with the Albanian Orthodox Diocese when a priest, Jose Rafael Melendez, claimed to have established a chapel in Red Bank, New Jersey with approval from Bishop Ilia. Evangelos issued an encyclical stating that the chapel was improperly established and urged parishioners and clergy not to attend its services. On November 14, 2017, Melendez sued Evangelos and the New Jersey Diocese for defamation. The case was ruled in favor of Evangelos in December 13, 2017 when the lawsuit was dismissed.

Metropolitan Evangelos was dethroned from his position in October 8, 2020 and the Diocese was suspended by Archbishop Elpidophoros, allegedly to absorb the New Jersey Diocese into the Archdiocesan District. However, this was never fulfilled as the suspension was lifted in 2022 by Ecumenical Patriarch Bartholomew and the diocese was restored. Evangelos was instead moved to the position of Metropolis of Sardis, a titular and much smaller position. In 2023, he was appointed member of the Holy Synod of the Phanar for a one year term, starting in March of that year.

Eastern Orthodox Church titles
Preceded by George (Papaioannou)	Metropolitan of New Jersey; 2003 - 2020	Succeeded by Apostolos (Koufallakis)
