= George Papaioannou =

Greek-American Orthodox bishop

His Eminence George
- Metropolitan of New Jersey
- Archdiocese: Greek Orthodox Archdiocese of America
- Installed: April 17, 1998
- Predecessor: Silas (Koskinas)
- Successor: Evangelos (Kourounis)

Personal details
- Born: April 17, 1933 Prodromos, Boeotia, Greece
- Died: November 22, 1999 (aged 66) Bethesda, Maryland
- Denomination: Eastern Orthodox
- Spouse: Maria Vasiliou (died 1993)
- Children: 3
- Education: Patriarchal Theological School of Halki; Boston University

Bishop George of New Jersey, born George Papaioannou (Greek: Γεώργιος Παπαϊωάννου; April 17, 1933 – November 22, 1999) was the Greek Orthodox bishop of the Metropolis of New Jersey from 1998 to 1999.

== Biography ==
Papaioannou was born on April 23, 1933 in Prodromos, near Thebes, Greece. He had two brothers, John and Elias. He went to Patriarchal Theological School of Halki where he graduated in 1957. He served at various churches in Turkey, Canada and New Hampshire. He received a doctoral degree in theology from Boston University in 1976.

He first arrived in America with his assignment in March, 1962 in Manchester, New Hampshire where he stayed until November 1971 when he was transferred to his first pastorate in Bethesda, Maryland. He also received the Brotherhood Award from the National Conference of Christians and Jews that same year. As priest, Papaioannou was known for his ability to engage with the community and fundraise. He raised $185,000 for a liver transplant for a young boy in 1985, and in 1997 he helped raise $265,000 also for a liver transplant for a monk in Mount Athos. Also in 1997, in a festivity honoring his 25th year at Bethesda attended by Archbishop Spyriodon, he asked all proceedings to go to restorations at Patriarchal Church in Turkey after a series of bombings.

Papaioannou was named bishop in 1998, becoming the eighth bishop of the diocese and the first married clergy. He would remain in that position until his sudden death on November 22, 1999 at the age of 66 after a stroke. He was survived by his three daughters and six grandchildren.

== Bibliography ==
- From Mars Hill to Manhattan: the Greek Orthodox in America under Patriarch Athenagoras I. 1976.
- Papaioannou, George (1985). The Odyssey of Hellenism in America. Thessaloniki: Patriarchal Institute for Patristic Studies.
- Papaioannou, George 1933- (1997). The Diamond Jubilee of the Greek Archdiocese of America 1922 to 1997. Vol. 45. Brookline, MA: Holy Cross Orthodox Press. p. 217.
- Papaioannou, George (1997). The Historical Development of the Greek Orthodox Archdiocese of North and South America. New York, NY: Greek Orthodox Archdiocese of America.

== Notes ==
Eastern Orthodox Church titles
| Preceded by Silas (Koskinas) | Metropolitan of New Jersey; 1998 - 1999 | Succeeded by Evangelos (Kourounis) |
