= Greek Orthodox Direct Archdiocesan District =

Metropolis of the Greek Orthodox Church

Coordinates: 40°46′35.5″N 73°57′47″W

Direct Archdiocesan District
Direct Archdiocesan District

Personnel
Archbishop	Elpidophoros of America
Cathedral	Archdiocesan Cathedral of the Holy Trinity

Geography
Location	New York (Including the Greater New York area, its northern suburbs, Long Island, and upstate New York), Western Connecticut, District of Columbia, and the Bahamas,

Vital Statistics
Total Parishes	65
- Website: ny.goarch.org

The Greek Orthodox Direct Archdiocesan District of the Greek Orthodox Archdiocese of America is the direct area overseen by the Archbishop of America with 67 parishes. It is under the direct administration of the Archbishop of America.
