= Greek Orthodox Metropolis of New Jersey =

Metropolis of the Greek Orthodox Church

Metropolis of New Jersey

Orthodox
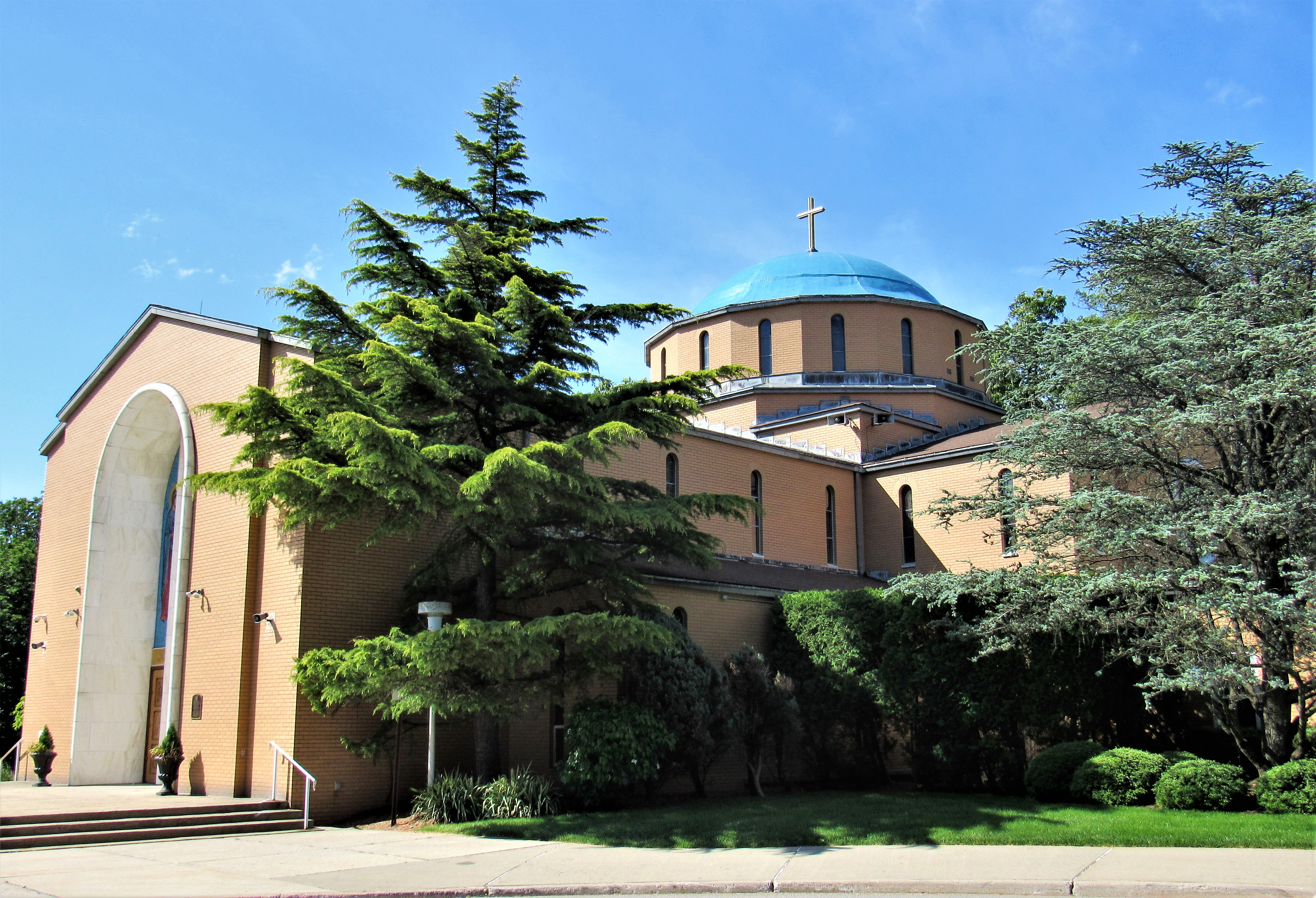
- Cathedral of St. John the Theologian in Tenafly, New Jersey

Location
- Country: United States of America
- Territory: New Jersey, the Greater Philadelphia area, Delaware, Maryland and Virginia

Statistics
- Parishes: 55

Information
- Denomination: Eastern Orthodox
- Rite: Eastern Rite
- Cathedral: Cathedral of St. John the Theologian
- Patron saint: St. Iakovos (Tsalikis) of Evia

Current leadership
- Patriarch: Ecumenical Patriarch of Constantinople
- Major Archbishop: Archbishop Elpidophoros of America
- Metropolitan: Metropolitan Athenagoras of New Jersey

Website
- www.nj.goarch.org

The Greek Orthodox Metropolis of New Jersey (Greek: Ιερά Μητρόπολις Νέας Ιερσέης) is one of the Metropolises of the Greek Orthodox Archdiocese of America with 55 parishes.

The Metropolis of New Jersey comprises 55 parishes that serve the faithful Orthodox Christians in New Jersey, the Greater Philadelphia area, Delaware, Maryland and Virginia.

== History ==
The first Greeks arrived in New Jersey in the 19th century. The first church in New Jersey, Saint Nicholas Church in Newark, was built in 1901.

In 2020 the diocese was suspended by Archbishop Elpidophoros with intents of integrating it into the Direct Archdiocesan District, however this was reversed by Ecumenical Patriarch Bartholomew in 2022 and the diocese was restored.

On July 24, 2023, His Eminence Metropolitan Apostolos upon the recommendation of His All Holiness, Ecumenical Patriarch Bartholomew was unanimously elected by the members of the Holy and Sacred Synod of the Ecumenical Patriarchate as the Metropolitan of the Greek Orthodox Metropolis of New Jersey.

On September 16, 2023, His Eminence Metropolitan Apostolos of New Jersey was enthroned at the Cathedral of St. John the Theologian in Tenafly, New Jersey.

== List of Bishops ==
- Metropolitan Silas (Koskinas) - 1979 - 1998
- Bishop George (Papaioannou) - 1998 - 1999
- Metropolitan Evangelos (Kourounis) - 2003 - 2020
- Metropolitan Apostolos (Koufallakis) - 2023–2026
- Metropolitan Athenagoras - 2026- Present
