= Greek Orthodox Metropolis of Detroit =

Metropolis of the Greek Orthodox Archdiocese of America

Greek Orthodox Metropolises
Metropolis of Detroit

Personnel
| Archbishop | Nicholas (Pissaris) |
| Cathedral | Annunciation Greek Orthodox Cathedral (Detroit) |

Geography
| Location | Michigan, Arkansas, Kentucky, and parts of Indiana, Tennessee, Ohio, and Upstate New York. |

Vital Statistics
| Total Parishes | 46 |
- Website: detroit.goarch.org

The Greek Orthodox Metropolis of Detroit is one of the Metropolises of the Greek Orthodox Archdiocese of America with 46 parishes. It was established in 1999, with its first and current bishop Metropolitan Nicholas.

The Metropolis of Detroit, oversees parishes in the states of Michigan, Arkansas, Kentucky, and parts of Indiana, Ohio, Tennessee, and Upstate New York.

== See also ==
- Greeks in Detroit
