= Archdiocesan Cathedral of the Holy Trinity =

Church in Manhattan, New York

- The Archdiocesan Cathedral of the Holy Trinity
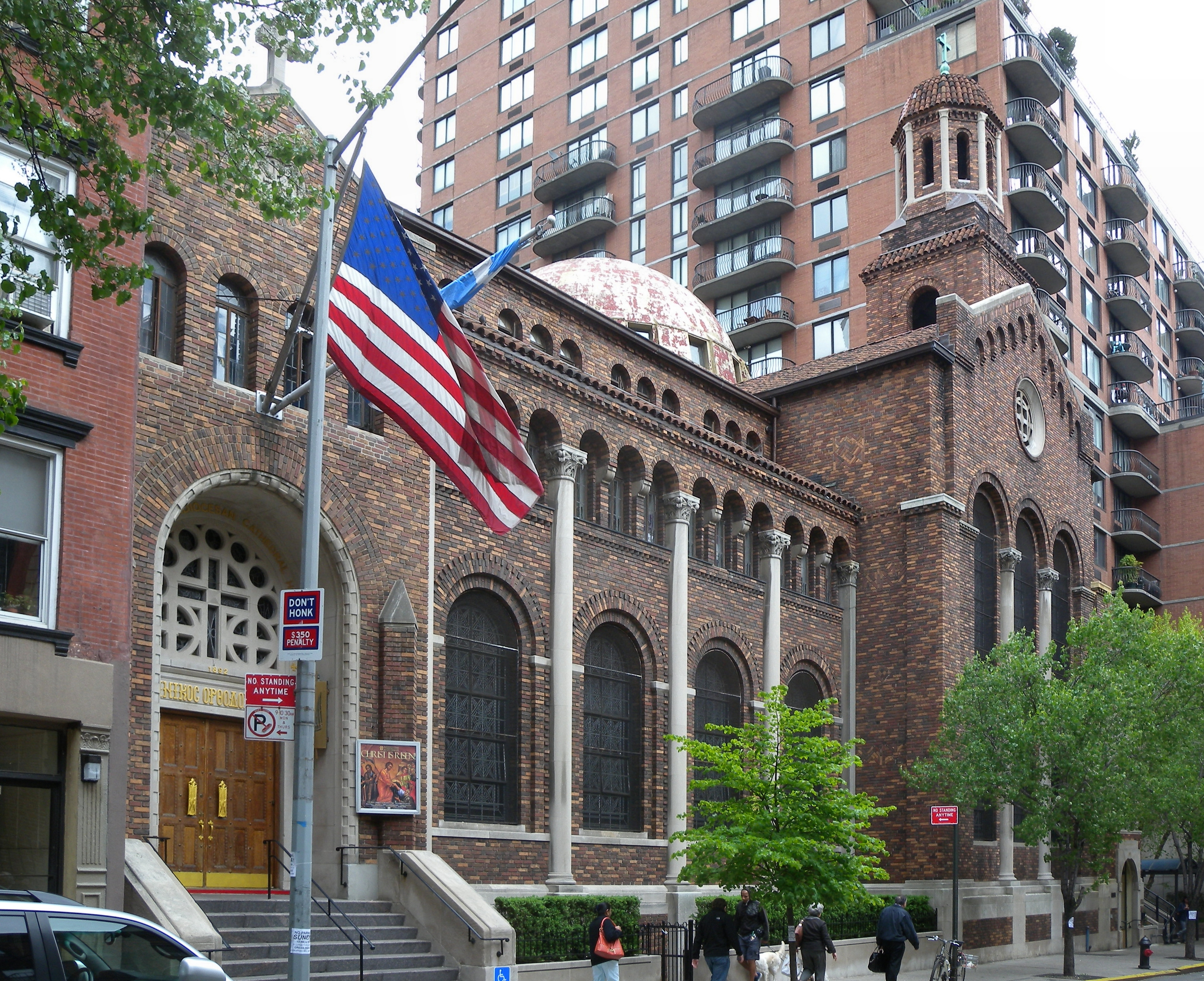
- The Archdiocesan Cathedral of the Holy Trinity in Manhattan
- Archdiocesan Cathedral of the Holy Trinity
- 40°46′11″N 73°57′22″W
- Location: 319 East 74th Street; New York City, New York 10021
- Country: United States
- Denomination: Greek Orthodox Church
- Website: thecathedralnyc.org

History
- Founded: 1891
- Dedication: Eleanor Roosevelt
- Dedicated: September 14, 1931
- Consecrated: October 22, 1933

Architecture
- Architect(s): Kerr Rainsford, John A. Thompson, Gerald A. Holmes
- Architectural type: Byzantine Moderne
- Completed: March 4, 1932
- Construction cost: $577,000 ($13,600,000 in current dollar terms)

Administration
- Metropolis: Direct Archdiocesan District
- Archdiocese: Archdiocese of America

Clergy
- Archbishop: Archbishop Elpidophoros of America
- Dean: Rev. Fr. Chrysostomos Gilbert

The Archdiocesan Cathedral of the Holy Trinity (Greek: Καθεδρικός Ναός Αγίας Τριάδας), at 319–337 East 74th Street on the Upper East Side of Manhattan in New York City, is a Neo-Byzantine-style Greek Orthodox church. It serves as the national cathedral of the Greek Orthodox Archdiocese of America, and as the episcopal seat of Archbishop Elpidophoros of America.

Established in 1891, and at its present location since 1932, it was the second Greek Orthodox church in the Americas, the first in New York City, and the largest Eastern Orthodox church in the Western Hemisphere.

== Activities ==
The cathedral is the home parish for 800 families, and hosts dignitaries and visitors. It offers regular worship (which is broadcast on television), Sunday school, afternoon school, the Cathedral School (grades N-8), Bible study, and various ministries and fellowship organizations.

== History ==
In 1891 the Holy Trinity Greek Orthodox parish's first home was in part of an Evangelical church on West 53rd Street for US$50 per month ($1,800 in current dollar terms). It was the second Greek Orthodox church in the Americas and the first in New York City.

In 1904 it was purchased and moved to a Gothic Episcopal church at 153 East 72nd Street. In 1927, the East 72nd Street church burned down, and two years later land was purchased and a new church was built for $577,000 ($13,600,000 in current dollar terms) in Byzantine style. Eleanor Roosevelt laid the cornerstone of the cathedral on September 14, 1931. Holy Trinity moved to its current location on March 4, 1932. Patriarch Athenagoras I of Constantinople, later Ecumenical Patriarch of Constantinople, consecrated the cathedral on October 22, 1933. He called it: "The Cathedral of all of Hellenism in America". In 1949, it established the Cathedral School. It was designated the archdiocesan cathedral in 1962.

On September 18, 1999, Archbishop Demetrios was enthroned at the cathedral as primate of the Greek Orthodox Church in America. The cathedral's dean, the Rev. Robert Stephanopoulos, had been demoted and relieved of responsibilities at the cathedral in January 1999 by Archbishop Spyridon of America, but by late 1999 had regained his position. Stephanopoulos retired in 2007, after being dean for 25 years, and Frank Marangos was named the new dean. Anastasios Gounaris became dean in 2012.

Opera singer Maria Callas was baptised at the church in 1926. In 2001 television journalist and former political advisor George Stephanopoulos and comedian Alexandra Wentworth were married there.

== Architecture ==
The exterior is Romanesque Revival red brick and limestone. The cathedral's architects were Kerr Rainsford, John A. Thompson, and Gerald A. Holmes; they later designed Hunter College Uptown, which is now known as Lehman College. The interior has Byzantine mosaics, botticino marble for the walls, columns, and altar, and imported Italian stained glass. The iconography on the dome was created by Georgios Gliatas, a student of iconographer Fotis Kontoglou. The church sits down the block from the Bohemian Gothic Revival Jan Hus Presbyterian Church.
