= Alexander Karloutsos =

American Greek-Orthodox priest and liaison

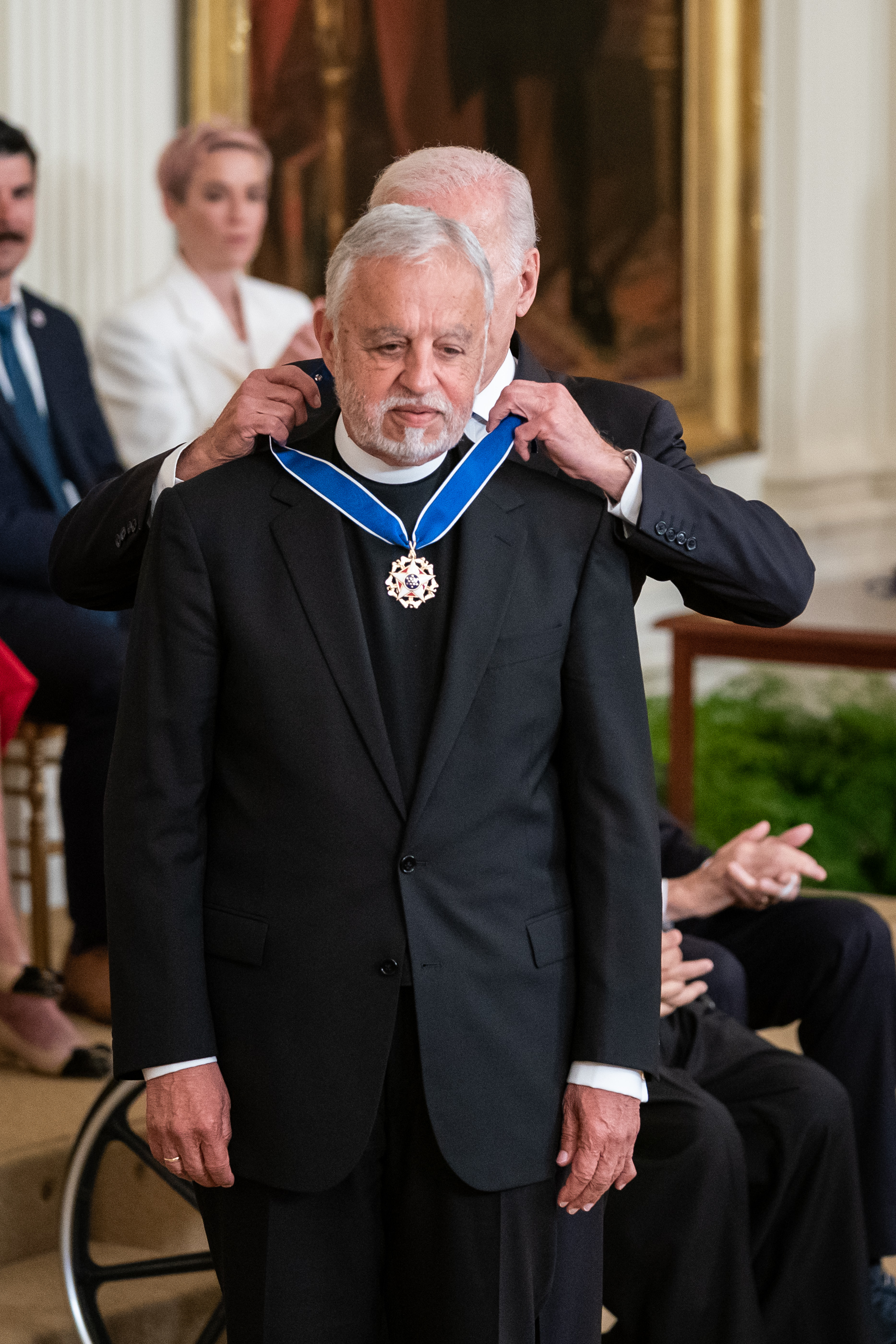
- Karloutsos Receiving the Presidential Medal of Freedom from President Joe Biden in 2022
- Born: April 5, 1945 (age 81); Greece
- Occupations: Clergy and Liaison
- Spouse: Xanthi Karavellas
- Awards: Presidential Medal of Freedom (2022)

Ecclesiastical career
- Church: Greek Orthodox Archdiocese of America
- Ordained: 1970
- Title: Protopresbyter

Alexander Karloutsos (Greek: Αλέξανδρος Καρλούτσος; born April 5, 1945), sometimes colloquially referred to as Father Alex, is a Greek-American Protopresbyter in the Greek Orthodox Archdiocese of America. He served in the Diocese for over fifty years, and is the second member of the Greek Orthodox clergy to be awarded the Presidential Medal of Freedom, acknowledging his counsel to several Presidents.

== Background and early life ==
Karloutsos was born on April 5, 1945, in Greece and immigrated with his family to the United States at an early age. His father, Michael, had been born in the United States but was raised in Latzio, Greece after being adopted. After marrying Karloutsos's mother Olga, and learning of his American citizenship, Michael decided to move his family to the United States.

After the family arrived, they joined an Old Calendarist parish, with Michael becoming ordained in that church. When Karloutsos's mother died, the family decided to join a mainstream parish. For the remainder of his childhood, the family moved homes often within the United States. Eventually, Karloutsos attended Hellenic College Holy Cross Greek Orthodox School of Theology, graduating valedictorian in 1966. He completed his master's degree in theology from the same institution in 1969, also graduating valedictorian.

== Clerical career ==
Karloutsos was ordained as a priest in 1970, working at the Saints Helen and Constantine Greek Orthodox Church in Chicago, shortly before it was converted to a mosque. By 1974 he was in New York, serving as the Director of the Office of Church and Society, starting in 1978. By 1984 Archbishop Iakovos had conferred the title of Presbyter on Karloutsos, and a decade later Patriarch Bartholemew elevated him to Protopresbyter of the Ecumenical Patriarchate, "the highest honor a married clergyman can receive in the Orthodox Christian Church", after spending two years serving as Special Assistant to the Patriarch. From 1986 to 1992, and again from 1999 to 2004, Karloutsos was the executive director of Leadership 100, an organization that promotes the Orthodox faith and the legacy of Greek culture and history. In 2017 he was awarded the Cross of the Order of the Holy Sepulcher by Patriarch Theophilos III of Jerusalem. In 2019 Karloutsos became Vicar General of the Archdiocese of America, the first person to hold the title since Archbishop Iakovos. He retired from the position in 2021.

== Liaison and Counsel ==
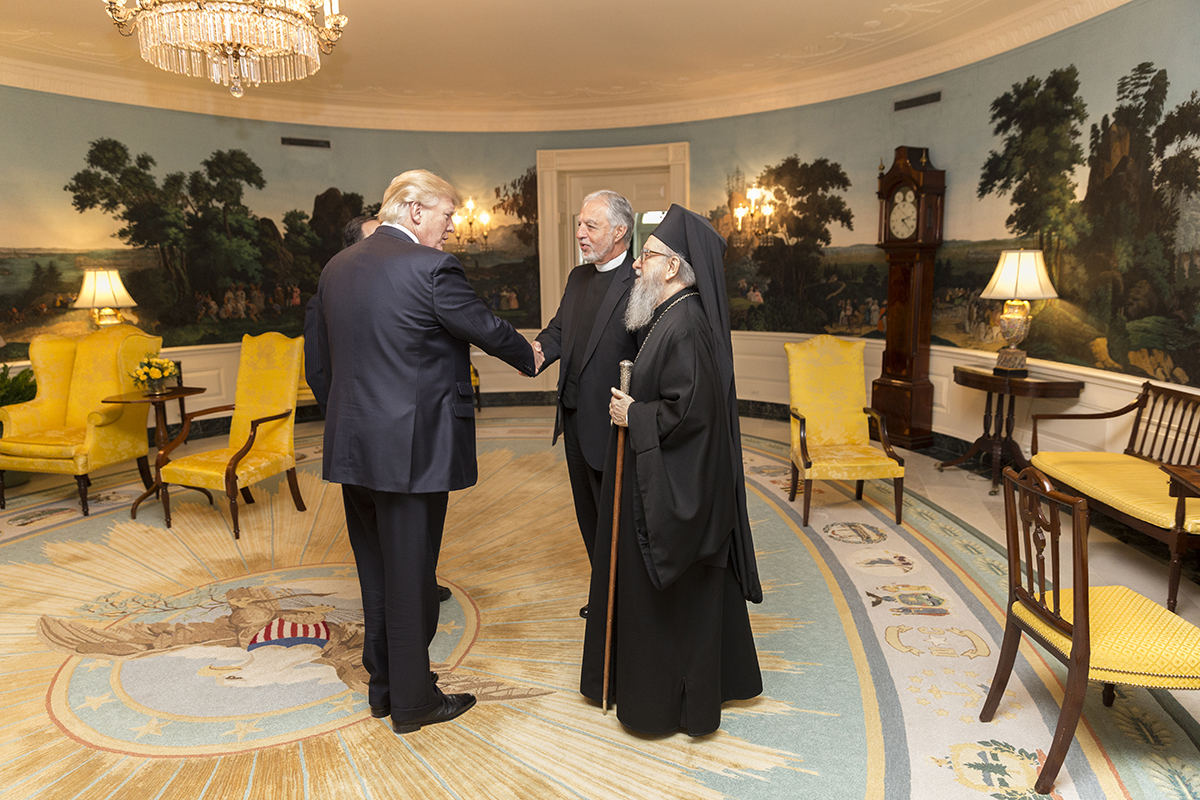
President Donald Trump meets Father Alex Karloutsos and Elder Archbishop Demetrios at the White House (March 24, 2017).

Karloutsos works as a liaison to institutions such as the White House, the US Congress, state and local governments, along with other groups under the title of Special Assistant to the Archbishop. Over this tenure, he has provided counsel to numerous US Presidents, and on July 7, 2022, Karloutsos was presented with the Presidential Medal of Freedom, the President's highest civilian award, by Joe Biden.

== Personal life ==
Karloutsos is married to Presbytera Xanthi Karavellas, and they have three children. His wife is active in the Orthodox Church and community, and serves on the board of the Beau Biden Foundation.
