= Demetrios of America =

Greek Orthodox archbishop

His Eminence Demetrios
- Geron Archbishop of America
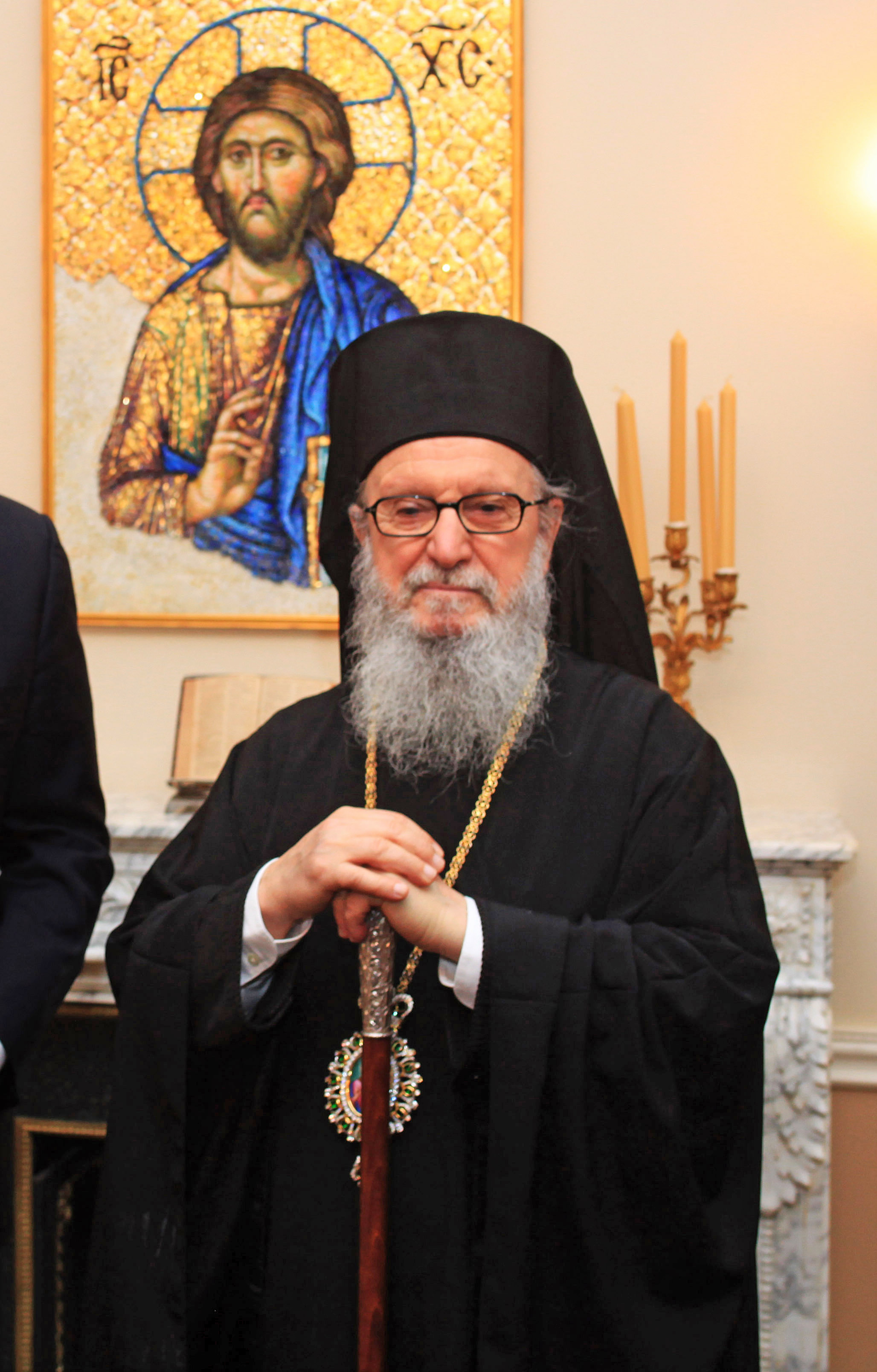
- Demetrios in 2010
- Native name: Αρχιεπίσκοπος Δημήτριος
- Church: Ecumenical Patriarchate of Constantinople
- Archdiocese: Greek Orthodox Archdiocese of America
- Elected: 19 August 1999
- Installed: 18 September 1999
- Term ended: 11 May 2019
- Predecessor: Spyridon (Papageorge)
- Successor: Elpidophoros (Lambriniadis)

Orders
- Ordination: Deacon 1960, Presbyter 1964
- Consecration: 17 September 1967

Personal details
- Born: Demetrios Trakatellis; 1 February 1928 (age 98) Thessaloniki, Greece
- Denomination: Eastern Orthodox Christianity
- Residence: New York City, New York, United States
- Parents: Georgia and Christos Trakatellis
- Education: University of Athens, Harvard University

Archbishop Demetrios (Secular name: Demetrios Trakatellis; Greek: Δημήτριος Τρακατέλλης) (b. 1 February 1928) is former Geron Archbishop of the Greek Orthodox Archdiocese of America and Exarch of the Atlantic and Pacific Ocean. He resigned from this position in 2019.

== Biography ==
Demetrios was born in Thessaloniki, Greece on 1 February 1928 to Georgia and Christos Trakatellis. He graduated in 1946 valedictorian from the Experimental School of the University of Thessaloniki. He attended the School of Theology at the National and Kapodistrian University of Athens, graduating summa cum laude in 1950. He became a deacon in 1960 and was ordained as a priest in 1964. He moved to the United States in 1965, attending the Harvard Graduate School of Arts and Sciences and obtaining his PhD in 1972. He later returned to the University of Athens, obtaining his Doctor of Theology degree in 1977. He served as auxiliary bishop to the Archbishop of Athens from 1967, and in 1968 declined to serve as Metropolitan of Attika and Megaris due to the political upheaval then taking place in Greece.

He was Distinguished Professor of Biblical Studies and Christian Origins at Hellenic College Holy Cross Greek Orthodox School of Theology in Brookline, Massachusetts, from 1983 to 1993, and was a visiting professor at Harvard Divinity School in 1984–85 and 1988–89. He returned to Greece in 1993 to serve at the Greek Orthodox Archdiocese of Athens.

On 18 September 1999, Elder Archbishop Demetrios was enthroned at the Archdiocesan Cathedral of the Holy Trinity as Primate of the Greek Orthodox Archdiocese of America. The cathedral on New York City's Upper East Side serves as the national cathedral of the Greek Orthodox Archdiocese of America and is the seat of the Archbishop.

On 26 November 2015, the Greek Orthodox Archdiocese of America was elevated to the rank of Gerontiki Eparchy (an eparchy headed by a Geron/Elder hierarch) of the Ecumenical Throne, led by Demetrios, with the style of His Eminence Geron Archbishop Demetrios of America.

== Academy and Holy Synod ==
Demetrios was elected as a member of the Academy of Athens in November 2002 and was inducted on 14 November 2003. He was elected to the Holy Synod of the Ecumenical Patriarchate on 19 February 2004.

Archbishop Demetrios delivered invocations at the Democratic National Convention on 27 August 2008 and the Republican National Convention on 4 September 2008. He also delivered the benediction at the Presidential Inaugural Luncheon on 21 January 2013.

== Resignation as Archbishop of America ==
Demetrios, whose leadership has been criticized by some as leading the Greek Orthodox Archdiocese of America into "financial, administrative, and spiritual bankruptcy," had been pressured three times beforehand by Patriarch Bartholomew, the Ecumenical Patriarch, to "voluntarily resign." After refusing each time, Bartholomew denied Demetrios another extension.

On 4 May 2019, Demetrios submitted his letter of resignation as Archbishop of America, effective on 9 May. His letter of resignation was made public on the scheduled date; hours after Bishop Andonios (Paropoulos) of Phasiane made his letter of resignation as Chancellor of the Archdiocese of America public. On 11 May, Metropolitan Elpidophoros (Lambriniadis) of Bursa was unanimously elected to succeed Demetrios, and Demetrios' resignation as Archbishop of America was made official.

== Writings ==
Demetrios is the author of six books as well as hundreds of articles and essays published in various periodicals.

- Presence of the Holy Spirit (1984)
- Authority and Passion (1987)
- The Transcendent God of Eugnostos (1991)
- Christ, the Pre-existing God (1992)
- The Fathers Interpret (1996)
- A Call to Faith (2004)

== Family ==
His brother, Antonios Trakatellis, is a New Democracy MEP for Greece and former Vice-President of the European Parliament.

Eastern Orthodox Church titles
Preceded by Spyridon (Papageorge)	Archbishop of America; 1999–2019	Succeeded by Elpidophoros (Lambriniadis)
