= Alexander Demoglou =

1st Greek Orthodox Archbishop of America (1922-1930)

- Archbishop of America
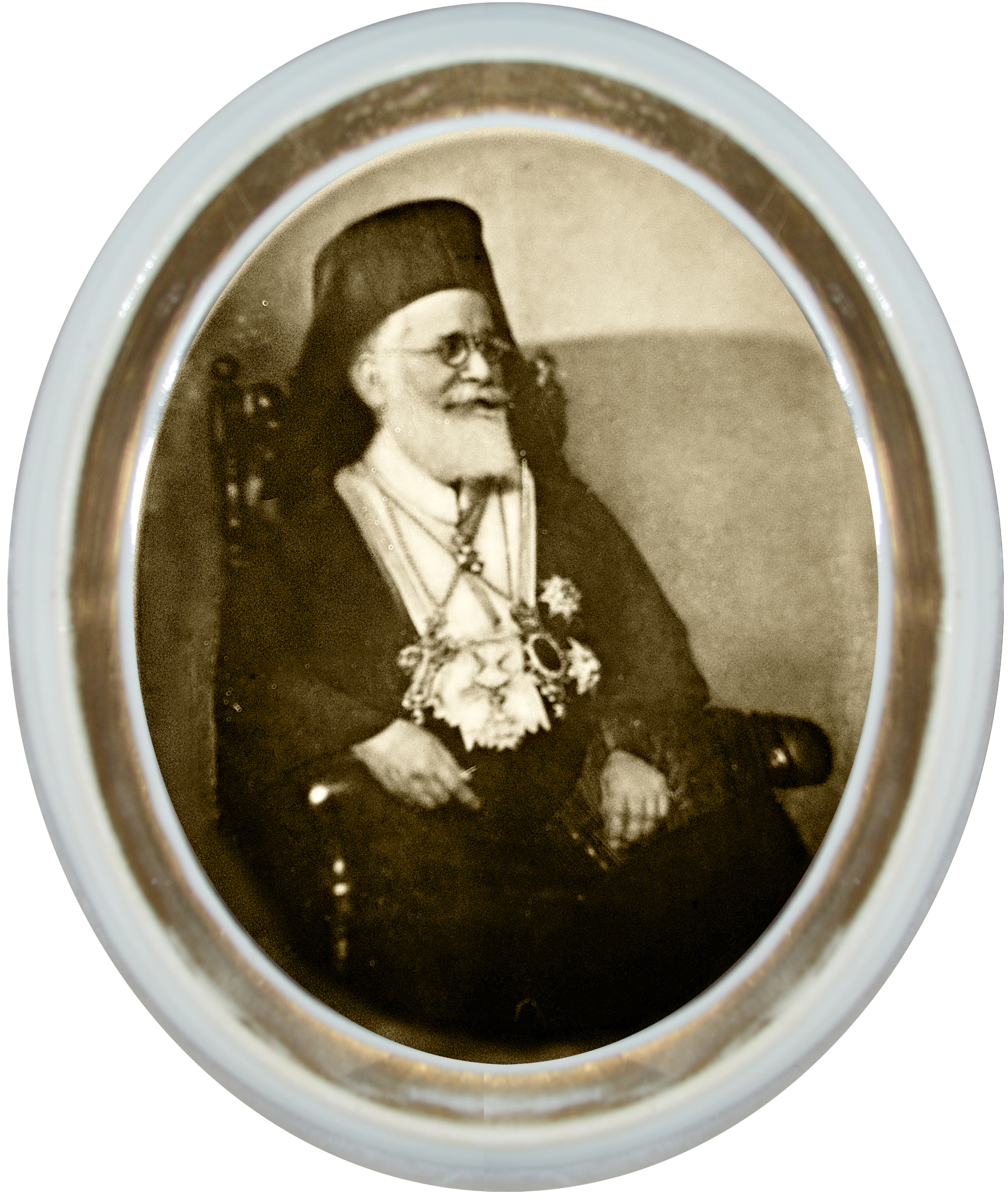
- Photo of Alexander from his tomb in the monastery Platitera
- Installed: 1922
- Term ended: 1930
- Predecessor: New title
- Successor: Athenagoras I
- Other post: Archbishop of Corfu

Personal details
- Born: 1876 Chalcedon (Kadıköy, Istanbul)
- Died: 1942 (aged 65–66)
- Denomination: Eastern Orthodox Church

Archbishop Alexander (Demoglou) of America (Greek: Αλέξανδρος Δήμογλου) (born 1876 – died 1942) was the first Greek Orthodox Archbishop of America, from 1922 to 1930.

Born at Chalcedon (now Kadıköy) in 1876, Alexander was ordained deacon in 1895 and priest in 1902. He received episcopal ordination in 1917 and went to North America in 1918.

In America, he served first initially as synodical vicar of the proto-archdiocese of North and South America, under the jurisdiction of Meletius (Metaxakis) of Athens. Meletius was Patriarch of Constantinople briefly from 1921 to 1923. One of the actions of Meletius IV of Constantinople as Patriarch was to appoint Alexander as Archbishop for all of America (North America and South America).

Alexander served as Archbishop of America until 1930, at which time the Patriarch moved him to be Archbishop of Corfu, where he continued to his death in 1942.

Alexander is credited as having saved 23 high school students from execution when the military commander of the Ionian Islands condemned them to death as a result of their involvement in actions against Mussolini.

Alexander was succeeded as Archbishop of America by Athenagoras who served until his election as Patriarch of Constantinople in 1948.

Eastern Orthodox Church titles
New title	Archbishop of America; 1922–1930	Succeeded by Athenagoras I
