= Greek Orthodox Archdiocese of America =

Eastern Orthodox diocese in the United States

- Abbreviation: GOArch
- Type: Eastern Orthodox
- Structure: Eparchy
- Ecumenical Patriarch and Archbishop of Constantinople–New Rome: Bartholomew I of Constantinople
- Primate: Archbishop of America; Elpidophoros
- Chancellor: Bishop Nektarios of Diokleia
- Vicar General: Fr. Alex Karloutsos
- Parishes: 534
- Associations: Christian Churches Together
- Language: Greek, English
- Headquarters: New York City
- Territory: United States
- Recognition: Orthodox
- Members: 1,500,000 (baptized members), 375,972 total Adherents, 84,552 regular (weekly) attendees
- Official website: www.goarch.org

Archbishop of America
- Archbishopric

Eastern Orthodox
- Incumbent; Elpidophoros since 22 June 2019
- Style: His Eminence

Location
- Country: United States
- Residence: New York City

The Greek Orthodox Archdiocese of America (GOArch; Greek: Ελληνική Ορθόδοξη Αρχιεπισκοπή Αμερικής), headquartered in New York City, is an eparchy of the Ecumenical Patriarchate of Constantinople. Its current primate is Archbishop Elpidophoros of America. The Greek Orthodox Archdiocese comprises some 530~ parishes and 20 monasteries across the United States of America, as of 2021. In 2015, the church claimed 1.5 million baptized members.

== History ==
Before the establishment of a Greek Archdiocese in the Western Hemisphere there were numerous communities of Greek Orthodox Christians. On June 26, 1768, the first Greek colonists landed at St. Augustine, Florida, the oldest city in America. The first Greek Orthodox community in the Americas was founded in 1864, in New Orleans, Louisiana, by a small colony of Greek merchants. The first permanent community was founded in New York City in 1892, today's Archdiocesan Cathedral of the Holy Trinity and the See of the Archbishop of America. The Greek Orthodox Archdiocese of North and South America was incorporated in 1921, and officially recognized by the State of New York in 1922.

In 1908, the Church of Greece received authority over the Greek Orthodox congregation of America, but in 1922 Patriarch Meletius IV of Constantinople transferred the archdiocese back to the jurisdiction of the Church of Constantinople. In 1996, the archdiocese was split by the Ecumenical Patriarchate into four separate archdioceses: those of America (the US), Canada, Central America, and South America.

== Organization ==
The Greek Orthodox Archdiocese of America is composed of an archdiocesan district (New York City) and eight metropolises (formerly dioceses): New Jersey, Chicago, Atlanta, Detroit, San Francisco, Pittsburgh, Boston and Denver. It is governed by the archbishop and the Eparchial Synod of Metropolitans. The synod is headed by the archbishop (as the first among equals) and comprises the metropolitans who oversee the ministry and operations of their respective metropolises. It has all the authority and responsibility which the Church canons provide for a provincial synod.

There are more than 500 parishes, 800 priests and approximately 440,000 to 2 million faithful in the Greek Orthodox Archdiocese of America, depending on the source of reports and the counting method being used. The Greek Orthodox Archdiocese itself claims to have 1.5 million baptized members. The number of parishes in the Greek Archdiocese rose by about 9% in the decade from 1990 to 2000, and membership growth has largely been in terms of existing members having children. Membership is concentrated in the Northeastern United States. The states with the highest rates of adherence are Massachusetts, New Hampshire, Rhode Island, and New York.

The archdiocese receives within its ranks and under its spiritual aegis and pastoral care Eastern Orthodox Christians, who either as individuals or as organized groups in the Metropolises and Parishes have voluntarily come to it and which acknowledge the ecclesiastical and canonical jurisdiction of the Ecumenical Patriarchate.

Additionally, one seminary is operated by the Greek Archdiocese, Holy Cross Greek Orthodox School of Theology in Brookline, Massachusetts, which educates not only Greek Archdiocese seminarians but also those from other jurisdictions, as well.

The Greek Orthodox Archdiocese of America was a member of SCOBA and is a member of its successor organization, the Assembly of Canonical Orthodox Bishops of the United States of America.

=== Archbishop ===
On May 11, 2019, the church's synod unanimously elected Metropolitan Elpidophoros of Bursa as the new archbishop of America following the voluntary resignation of Archbishop Demetrios. In addition to serving as Metropolitan of Bursa, Elpidophoros has also served as Abbot of the Holy Monastery of the Holy Trinity in Halki and Professor of the Theological School of the Aristoteleian University of Thessaloniki. Metropolitan Methodios of Boston served as the locum tenens until Elpidophoros was enthroned on June 22, 2019. These leaders succeed the following archbishops:

- † Alexander (Demoglou), 1922–1930
- † Athenagoras (Spyrou), 1931–1948
- † Timotheos Evangelinidis, 1949 (elected, but reposed before taking office)
- † Michael (Konstantinides), 1950–1958
- † Iakovos (Coucouzis), 1959–1997
- Spyridon (Papageorge), 1997–1999

The archbishop of the archdiocese is variously titled as, "Primate of the Greek Orthodox Church in America, Exarch of the Ecumenical Patriarchate, President of the Holy Eparchial Synod, and Chairman of the Assembly of Canonical Orthodox Bishops of the United States of America."

=== Holy Eparchial Synod ===
The Holy Eparchial Synod of the Archdiocese is composed of:

- Archbishop Elpidophoros (Lambriniadis) of America, President
- Metropolitan Methodios (Tournas) of Boston
- Metropolitan Athenagoras (Ziliaskopoulos) of New Jersey
- Metropolitan Constantine (Moralis) of Denver
- Metropolitan Sevastianos (Skordallos) of Atlanta
- Metropolitan Nicholas (Pissaris) of Detroit
- Metropolitan Savas (Zembillas) of Pittsburgh
- Metropolitan Gerasimos (Michaleas) of San Francisco
- Metropolitan Nathanael (Symeonides) of Chicago

=== Hierarchs ===
==== Diocesan bishops ====
- Archbishop Elpidophoros (Lambriniadis) of America
- Metropolitan Methodios (Tournas) of Boston
- Metropolitan Constantine (Moralis) of Denver
- Metropolitan Sevastianos (Skordallos) of Atlanta
- Metropolitan Nicholas (Pissare) of Detroit
- Metropolitan Gerasimos (Michaleas) of San Francisco
- Metropolitan Savas (Zembillas) of Pittsburgh
- Metropolitan Athenagoras (Ziliaskopoulos) of New Jersey
- Metropolitan Nathanael (Symeonides) of Chicago

(This is the actual hierarchical seniority order and formal listing of the bishops).

==== Auxiliary bishops ====
- Bishop Demetrios (Kantzavelos) of Mokissos, assigned to the Metropolis of Chicago
- Bishop Sebastianos (Skordallos) of Zela
- Bishop Joachim of Amissos
- Bishop Spyridon of Amastris
- Bishop Timothy of Hexamilion
- Bishop Ioannis of Phocaea
- Bishop Constantine of Sassima
- Bishop Nektarios of Diokleia
- Bishop Anthony of Synada
- Bishop Dionysios of Zenopolis

==== Retired bishops ====
- Bishop Iakovos (Pililis) of Catania (reposed in June 2018)
- Metropolitan Dimitrios (Couchell) of Xanthos, Elevated to Metropolitan in January 2023
- Metropolitan Isaiah (Chronopoulos) of Lystra
- Metropolitan Alexios (Panagiotopoulos) of Atlanta

=== Deceased hierarchs ===
- Archbishop Athenagoras (Cavadas) of Thyateira and Great Britain (formerly of Boston)
- Archbishop Athenagoras (Kokkinakis) of Thyateira and Great Britain
- Metropolitan Anthony (Gergiannakis) of San Francisco
- Metropolitan Germanos (Polyzoides) of Hierapolis
- Metropolitan Iakovos (Garmatis) of Chicago
- Metropolitan Joachim (Alexopoulos) of Demetrias (formerly of Boston)
- Metropolitan Philaretos (Johannides) of Syros (formerly of Chicago)
- Metropolitan Silas (Koskinas) of Saranta Ekklesia (formerly of New Jersey)
- Bishop Aimilianos (Laloussis) of Harioupolis
- Bishop Eirinaios (Tsourounakis) of San Francisco
- Bishop George (Papaioannou) of New Jersey
- Bishop Gerasimos (Papadopoulos) of Abydos
- Bishop Germanos (Liamadis) of Constantia
- Bishop Germanos (Psallidakis) of Synadon
- Bishop Kallistos (Papageorgapoulos) of San Francisco
- Bishop Meletios (Diacandrew) of Aristeas
- Bishop Meletios (Tripodakis) of Christianopoulis
- Bishop Paul (deBallester) of Nazianzos
- Bishop Philip (Koutoufas) of Atlanta
- Bishop Theodosius (Sideris) of Ancona
- Bishop Timothy (Haloftis) of Chicago
- Metropolitan Philotheos (Karamitsos) of Meloa

== Archdiocesan institutions ==
Information about different institutions throughout the United States which are part of the Greek Orthodox Archdiocese of America.

=== Archdiocesan Cathedral of Holy Trinity ===
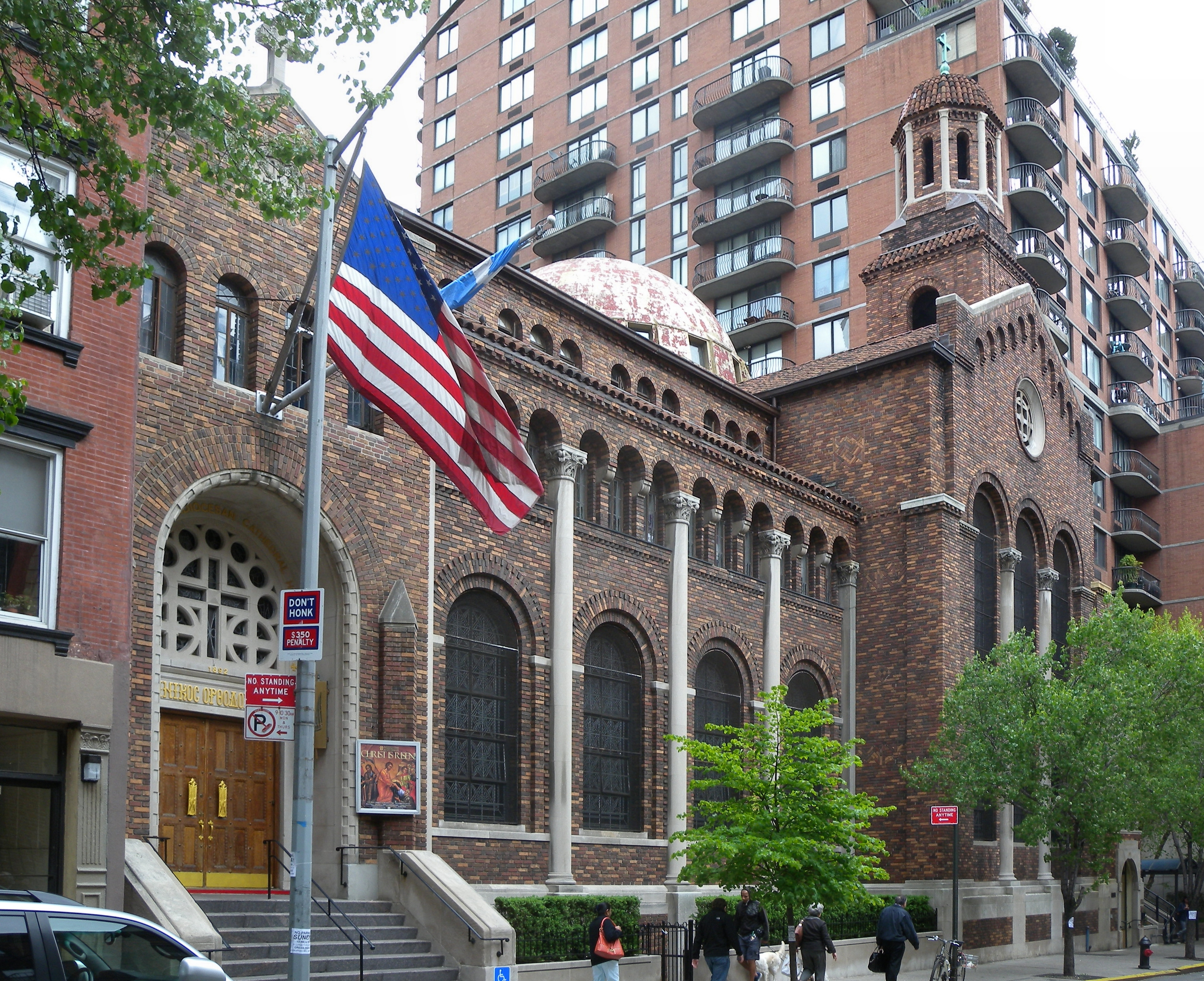
Archdiocesan Cathedral of the Holy Trinity

The Archdiocesan Cathedral of the Holy Trinity provides regular divine worship, counseling, Christian education, human services and cultural programs for people in the New York City area.

=== Hellenic College and Holy Cross School of Theology ===
Hellenic College and Holy Cross Greek Orthodox School of Theology together constitute a Greek Orthodox Christian institution of higher learning providing undergraduate and graduate education. Located on a 52-acre (21 ha) campus in Brookline, Massachusetts, Hellenic College and Holy Cross seek to educate leaders, priests, lay persons, men and women.

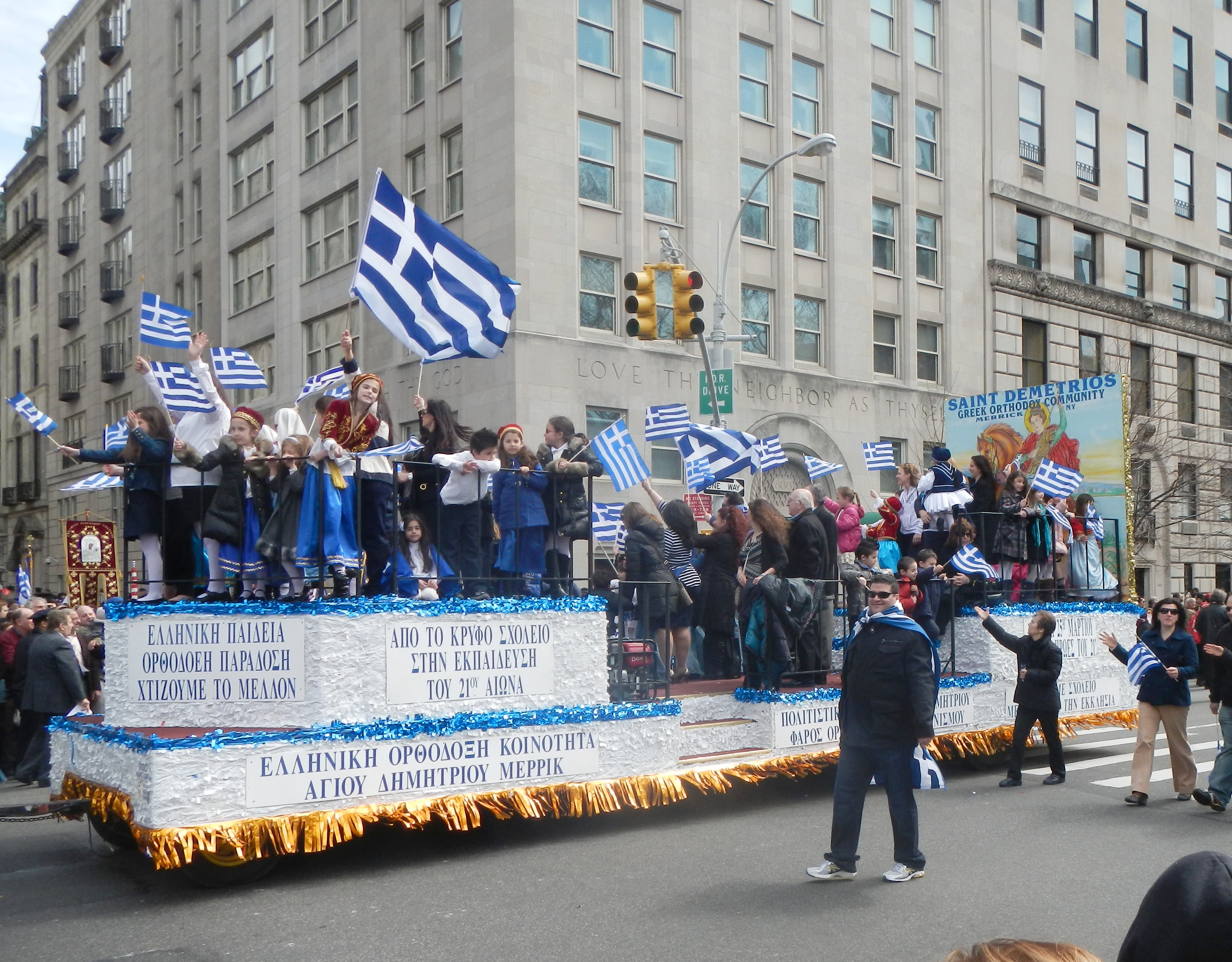
Philoptochos of Merrick, New York

=== Others ===
- Saint Basil Academy (Garrison, New York)

== See also ==
- Archbishop of America
- Greek Orthodox Church
- Greek American
- Greek Canadians
- Assembly of Canonical Orthodox Bishops of the United States of America
- Antiochian Orthodox Christian Archdiocese of North America

== Notes ==
1.The number of adherents given in the "Atlas of American Orthodox Christian Churches" is defined as "individual full members" with the addition of their children. It also includes an estimate of how many are not members but regularly participate in parish life. Regular attendees includes only those who regularly attend church and regularly participate in church life.

== Citations ==
- Pappaioannou, Rev. George (1984). "The Historical Development of the Greek Orthodox Archdiocese of North and South America". In Litsas, F.K. (ed.). A Companion to the Greek Orthodox Church. New York, N.Y.: Greek Orthodox Archdiocese of North and South America. pp. 178–206.
