= Elpidophoros of America =

Greek Orthodox Archbishop of America (born 1967)

His Eminence Elpidophoros
- Archbishop of the Greek Orthodox Archdiocese of America
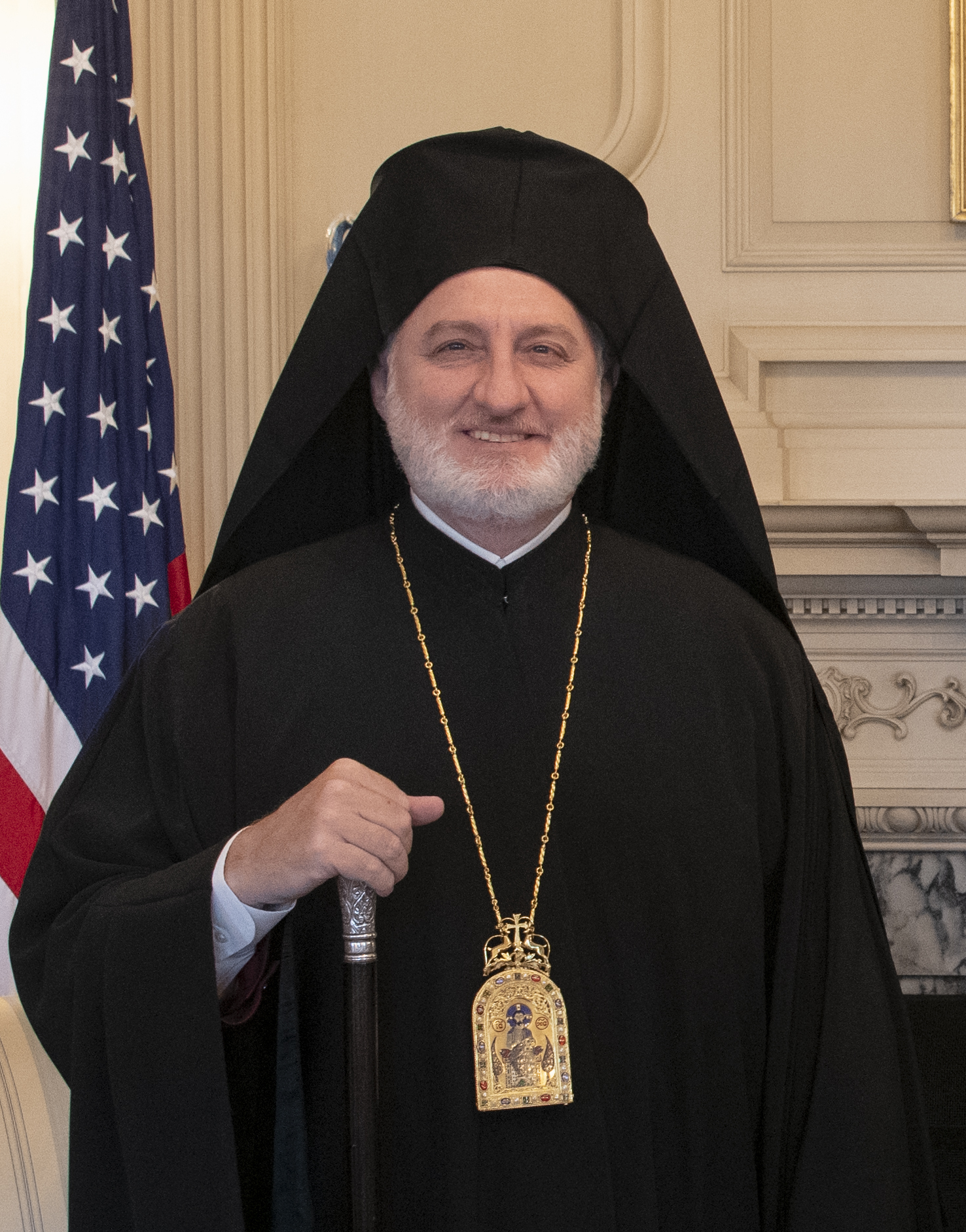
- Elpidophoros in 2020
- Elected: 11 May 2019
- Installed: 22 June 2019
- Predecessor: Demetrios

Orders
- Ordination: March 2005
- Consecration: March 2011

Personal details
- Born: Ioannis Lambriniadis; 28 November 1967 (age 58) Bakırköy, Istanbul, Turkey
- Denomination: Greek Orthodox
- Occupation: University Professor, Clergyman
- Education: Aristotle University of Thessaloniki (BA, PhD); University of Bonn (MA)

Elpidophoros of America (Greek: Ελπιδοφόρος, Greek pronunciation: [e̞l.pi.ðo̞ˈfo̞.ɾ̠o̞s̠]; born Ioannis Lambriniadis Greek: Ιωάννης Λαμπρυνιάδης; 28 November 1967) is a bishop of the Ecumenical Patriarchate of Constantinople and a professor at the Faculty of Theology of the Aristotle University of Thessaloniki. Since 22 June 2019, he has served as the archbishop and primate of the Greek Orthodox Archdiocese of America.

As Archbishop of America, his official title is His Eminence Archbishop Elpidophoros (Lambriniadis) of America, Most Honorable Exarch of the Greek Orthodox Archdiocese of America. He is the eighth archbishop of America elected since the establishment of the Greek Orthodox Archdiocese of America in 1922.

== Biography ==
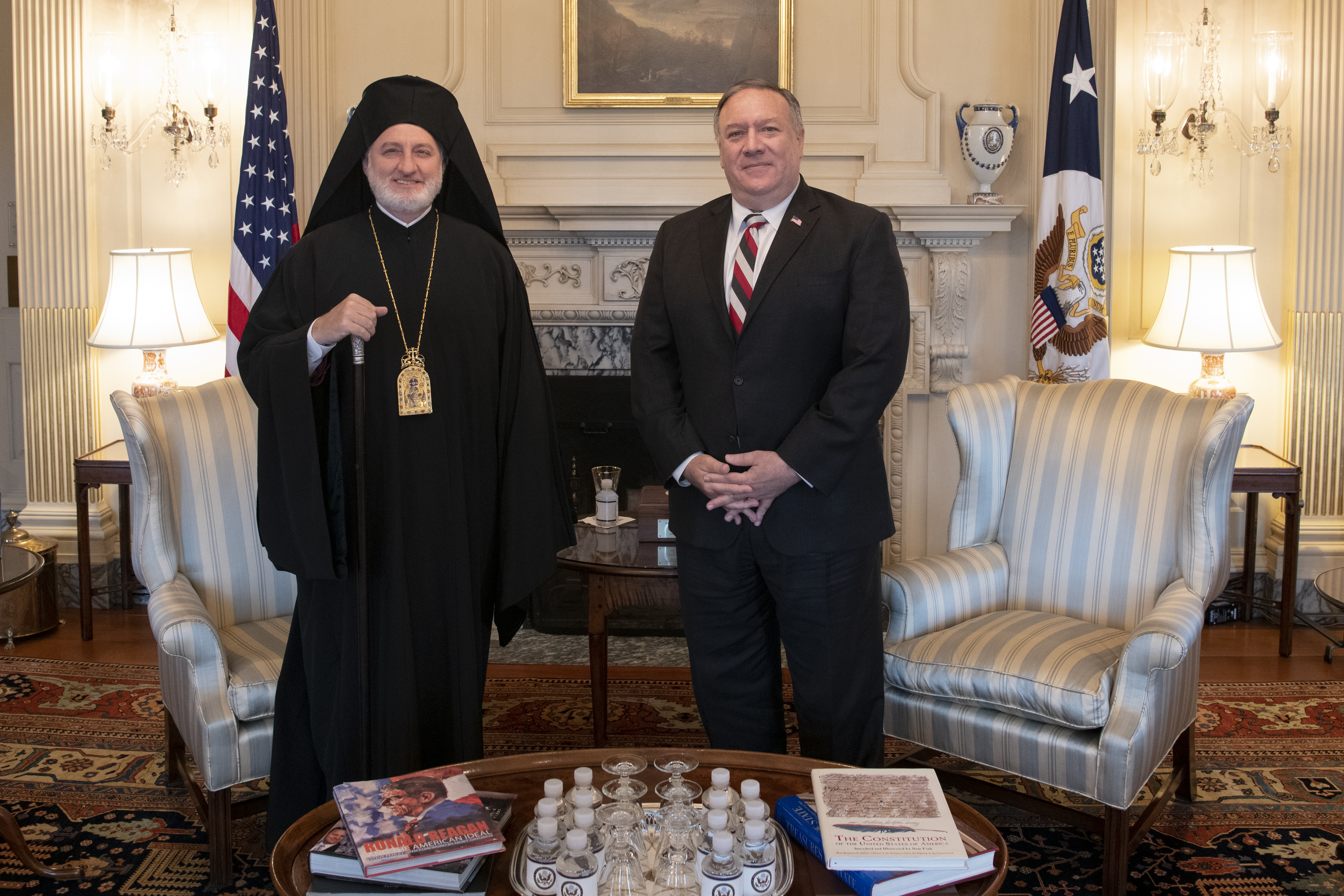
Elpidophoros with U.S. Secretary of State Mike Pompeo in September 2020

=== Early life, education, and academic career ===
Archbishop Elpidophoros was born Ioannis Lambriniadis in Istanbul's Bakırköy district (Makrohori), Turkey, to Vassilis and Nadia Lambriniadis on November 28, 1967. He attended the Urban School of Makrochori in Istanbul and later completed high school in Athens, Greece. Graduating with highest honors from Aristotle University of Thessaloniki in 1991 with a bachelor's degree in theology, he continued his studies at the University of Bonn in Germany, earning a master's degree in philosophy in 1993. He studied Arabic at the University of Balamand, Lebanon and obtained a Ph.D. in theology from Aristotle University of Thessaloniki in 2001, again graduating with highest honors.

Archbishop Elpidophoros is a tenured professor of theology at the Aristotle University of Thessaloniki. He assumed the position of associate professor at Aristotle University's Department of Pastoral and Social Theology in 2011, and has taught courses in the areas of Comparative Theology, Inter-Orthodox & Inter-Christian Relations, and the Ecumenical Movement. He was promoted to the rank of full tenured professor in 2018. Additionally, he served as a visiting professor of theology for one semester at the Holy Cross Greek Orthodox School of Theology in Brookline, Massachusetts, in 2004.

=== Clerical life ===
In 1994, he was ordained deacon at the Patriarchal Church of St. George in the Phanar in Istanbul and was appointed as the Codecographer of the Holy and Sacred Synod. "In 1995, he was appointed Deputy Secretary of the Holy Synod of the Ecumenical Patriarchate."

In March 2005, at the proposal of the Ecumenical Patriarch Bartholomew, he was appointed to the position of Chief Secretary and was ordained to the priesthood by the Ecumenical Patriarch Bartholomew I. He was installed as the Metropolitan of Bursa on 20 March 2011. In August of the same year, he was appointed Abbot of the Monastery of the Holy Trinity on Heybeliada.

On 11 May 2019, he was elected by the Holy Synod of the Ecumenical Patriarchate of Constantinople as next Greek Orthodox Archbishop of America to succeed Archbishop Demetrios. He was enthroned in New York City on 22 June 2019.

After he became archbishop, he has since served as chairman of the board of trustees at Hellenic College Holy Cross.

On October 8, 2020, Elpidophoros dethroned Metropolitan Evangelos of New Jersey, allegedly to absorb the New Jersey Diocese into the Archdiocesan District, directly controlled by Elpidophoros. However, this was never fulfilled as the suspension was lifted in 2022 by Ecumenical Patriarch Bartholomew and the diocese was restored. Evangelos was instead moved to the position of Metropolis of Sardis, a titular and much smaller position.

In December 2020, Elpidophoros met with Emilio Alvarez, founder and archbishop of the Union of Charismatic Orthodox Churches.

On 9 July 2022, Elpidophoros baptized the children of a gay couple, causing significant controversy, and prompting the Greek Holy Synod to send a letter protesting his actions to Patriarch Bartholomew. Elpidophoros was later reprimanded by the Synod of the Ecumenical Patriarchate. Elpidophoros defended his actions, saying that "Anyone who asks me to baptize their child I will do it, regardless of who it is. I baptize children and I don’t care about the personal life of their parents. I don’t judge people’s lives".

By June 2025, Elpidophoros authorized an ecumenical prayer service between the Greek Orthodox Archdiocese of America, and clergy from the non-canonical American Orthodox Catholic Church.

== Political activities ==
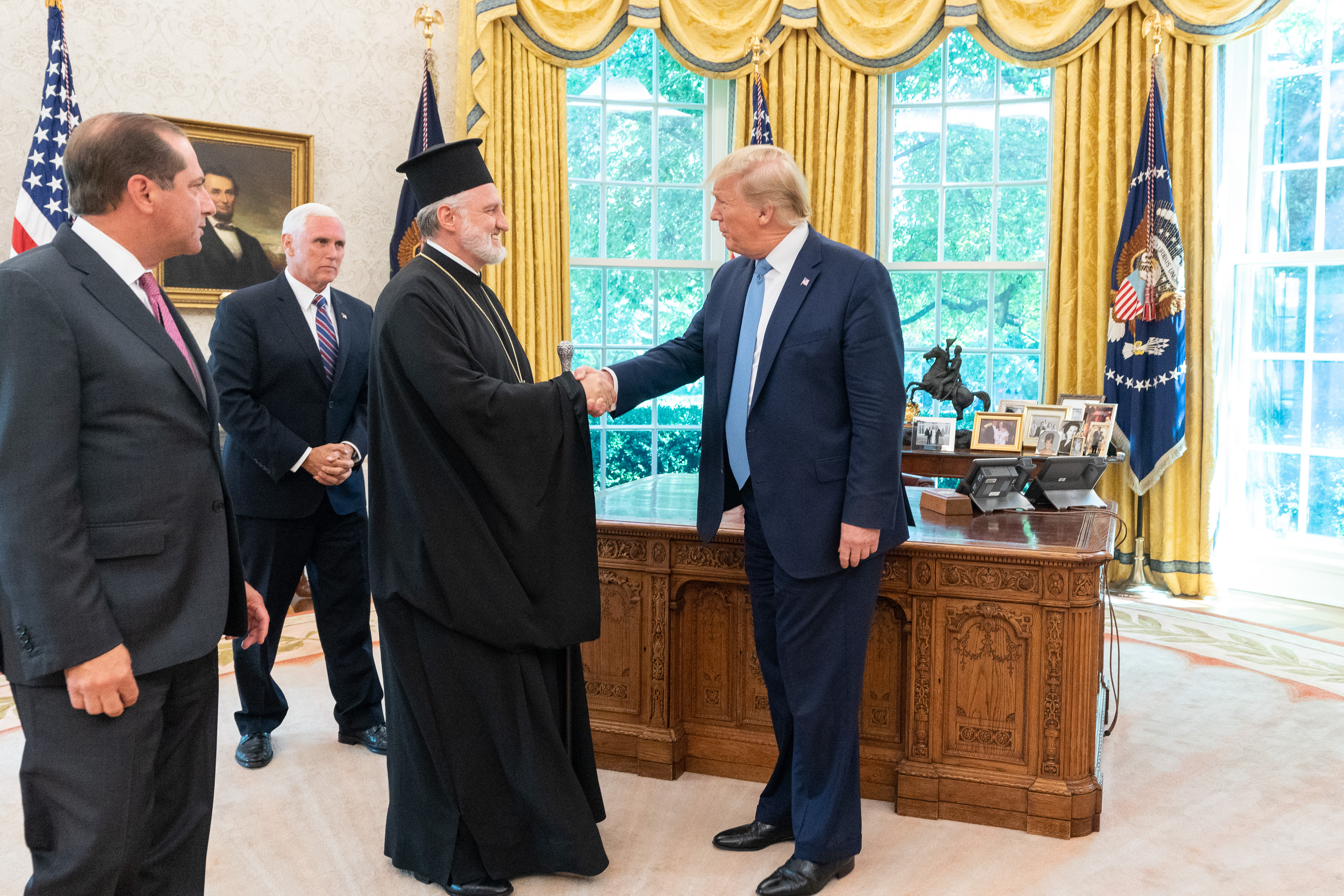
Archbishop Elpidophoros of America with President Donald Trump in 2019

Archbishop Elpidophoros has been involved in several political activities since assuming the role of Archbishop of America. On 16 July 2019, Archbishop Elpidophoros had a meeting with U.S. President Donald Trump, U.S. Vice President Mike Pence and other White House officials.

=== Marching in Brooklyn ===
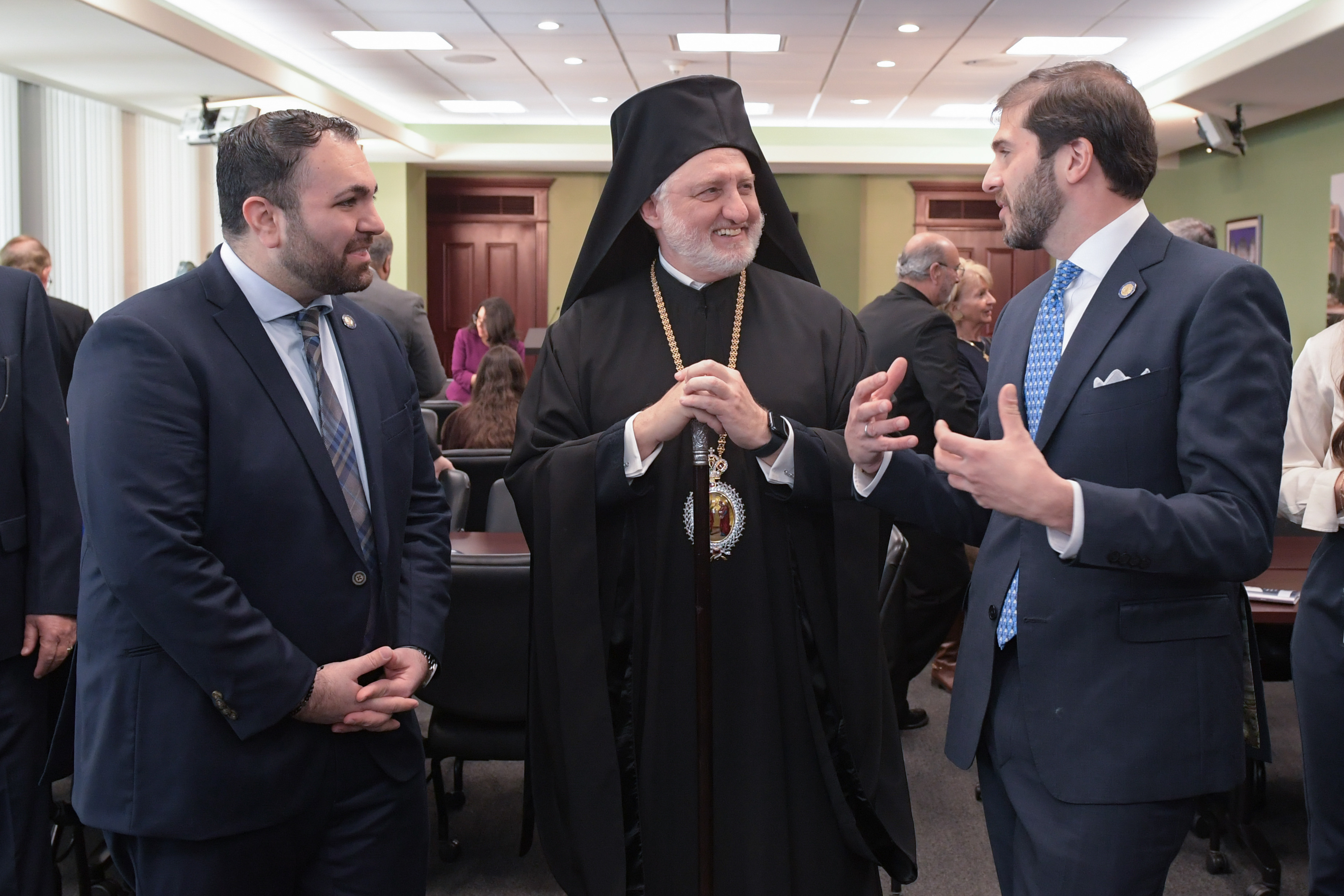
Elpidophoros speaks with Andrew Gounardes (right) and Michael Tannousis (left) in the New York State Capitol.

On 3 June 2020, at the invitation of the Borough President of Brooklyn, Eric Adams, and State Senator Andrew Gounardes, Archbishop Elpidophoros attended a peaceful protest in Crown Heights, Brooklyn, over the killing of Louisville EMT Breonna Taylor. In remarks following the march he said:

"I came here to Brooklyn today in order to stand in solidarity with my fellow sisters and brothers whose rights have been sorely abused. This was a peaceful protest, one without violence of any kind, and I thank all of those involved, because violence begets only more violence. We must speak and speak loudly against the injustice in our country. It is our moral duty and obligation to uphold the sanctity of every human being. We have faced a pandemic of grave physical illness, but the spiritual illness in our land runs even deeper and must be healed by actions as well as words. And so, I will continue to stand in the breach together with all those who are committed to preserving peace, justice, and equality for every citizen of goodwill, regardless of their race, religion, gender or ethnic origin."

=== Reclassification of the Hagia Sophia to a mosque ===
In early July 2020, the Turkish Council of State annulled the Cabinet's 1934 decision to convert Hagia Sophia to a museum and revoked the monument's status, and a subsequent decree by Turkish president Recep Tayyip Erdoğan ordered the reclassification of Hagia Sophia as a mosque. Archbishop Elpidophoros took a stand against this decision. On 19 July, the Members of the Holy Eparchial Synod of the Greek Orthodox Archdiocese of America, under the presidency of Archbishop Elpidophoros, designated 24 July as a day of mourning. In an interview with the BBC, the archbishop said, "This day is for us a mourning day. It’s the day we grieve this decision of the Turkish government to reconvert a monument, which is so important for the whole world. This is such a painful situation for us that we announced this day as a day for mourning. It’s like Good Friday for all Christians." He went on to say, "Certainly I can tell you that we will never stop. It’s a beginning for us. We will start a campaign. I already, yesterday, had the opportunity to express the concerns of all Orthodox Christians in the United States to the President, Trump, who received me in the White House, and to the Vice President, Mr. Pence."

On 23 July 2020, Archbishop Elpidophoros met with President Donald Trump and Vice President Mike Pence on the concerns of the Ecumenical Patriarchate and the Greek Orthodox Archdiocese over the seizure and re-conversion of the Hagia Sophia into a mosque. Following the meeting with the President and Vice President, the Archbishop stated: "I am grateful to have met with President Trump and Vice President Pence in the White House and communicated our grave dismay at the re-conversion of Hagia Sophia into a mosque, as well as ongoing security concerns for the Ecumenical Patriarchate and issues of religious liberty. In view of tomorrow’s day of mourning, we persevere in prayer but also bring our struggle to the highest levels of government for action and consideration." While the archbishop was meeting with the president, the U.S. House of Representatives passed, by unanimous consent, an amendment offered by Congresswoman Dina Titus (D-NV) objecting to Turkey's seizure of the Great Church of Holy Wisdom.

The Titus amendment to HR 7608 - which was cosponsored by Congressmen Gus Bilirakis (R-FL), John Sarbanes (D-MD), Chris Pappas (D-NH), David Cicilline (D-RI), Ted Deutch (D-FL), Brad Sherman (D-CA) and Brad Schneider (D-IL) - calls on the State Department to "denounce Turkey for taking formal action to change the status of Hagia Sophia, a UNESCO World Heritage Site spiritually significant to people of many faiths and backgrounds, from a museum to a mosque; and to engage with Turkey for the purpose of returning its status to a museum so as to welcome people of all faiths and those who have marveled at its architectural and artistic splendor."

=== Republican and Democratic National Conventions of 2024 ===
On 15 July 2024, offered the opening invocation on the first day of the Republican National Convention.

"Let us pray to the Lord of all. Almighty and eternal God, in peace we come before You and implore Your infinite goodness. Look upon this gathering of our nations' political leaders and grant them illumined hearts and minds to serve their fellow citizens through this Republican National Convention. Grant unto the nominee president Donald J. Trump and to his advisors and counsellors wisdom, grace and the spirit of beauty - that they may embrace all Americans' needs, shining the light of good government upon the venerable institutions of the world's best hope for everyone's life, liberty and pursuit of happiness. Grant unto the delegates the powerful recognition of purpose, to bear witness to divine providence which has shielded this great land through the centuries and drives us to a more perfect union with one another, ever building on the labors of those pioneers of patriotism who went before us. Preserve, protect and defend the servicemen and women who daily safeguard our freedoms so that in prosperity and tranquility we can worship You - the creator, redeemer and sanctifier of the universe and be the blessed people whose God is the Lord. Amen."

On 20 August 2024, offered the opening invocation on the second day of the Democratic National Convention.

"It is now time to pray to the Lord. Let us pray to the Lord Eternal and ever living God, source of goodness and grace. We come before You seeking Your heavenly benediction upon this Democratic National Convention. Grant unto the nominee for president of these United States Vice President Kamala Harris and her running mate Governor Tim Walz to pursue the highest offices in the land with love, with hope, and with faith in our nation. Grant unto the delegates to engage with their fellow citizens in a spirit of joy and unity, always seeking the best for our country. We also ask special blessings upon President Joseph Biden, First Lady Jill Biden, and their family. For he has given a lifetime of service and of sacrifice to the American people and has stood with nobility and integrity up upon the international stage to lead in the best traditions of the United States. Finally, we ask that You protect and defend the Armed Forces who protect and defend us, so that in peace and security we may offer to You the One True God the praise that is in Your due. Amen."

== Bibliography ==
- "Die Brüder Ioannis und Nikolaos Mesaritis Verteidiger der Orthodoxie in den Unionsverhandlungen von 1204 bis 1214 (im historischen und theologischen Rahmen der Epoche)", Heritage 28 (1996) 187-236.
- The attitude of Severus of Antioch towards the Council of Chalcedon, PhD thesis, Thessaloniki 2001
- The Ninety-five Theses of Luther. Historical-theological perspective – Text – Translation – Comments, Thessaloniki 2009
- The Institution of the Synod of Hierarchs of the Ecumenical Throne (1951-2004), published by the Holy Theological School of Halki, Constantinople 2015
- Ecumenical Patriarchate. Di-Orthodox Relations and Inter-Christian Witness, published by the Holy Theological School of Halki, Istanbul 2018
- The Patriarchs of Chalkis, Vol. 1 (1842-1901), Published by the Holy Theological School of Chalkis, Constantinople 2018
- The Ecumenical Patriarch Bartholomew in Ukraine, Publication of the Holy Theological School of Halki, Constantinople 2018
- "The Christians of Turkey: The future (Die Christen in der Türkei", in A. Müller (ed.), Das Kreuz unter dem Halbmond, Orientalische Christen im Angesicht des "Arabischen Frühlings", Studien zur Orientalischen Kirchengeschichte LIT 50 (2014) 151-159
- "The Orthodox Diaspora," (P.A.E.A.K. Academic Yearbook, vol. E', In Memory of the Elder Metropolitan of Ephesus, Kyros Chrysostomos (1991-2006), pp. 193–210
- "Greek Orthodoxy, the Ecumenical Patriarchate and the Church in the USA" (Lecture at the annual Summer Symposium of St. Vladimir's Theological School, New York, June 12, 2010 [= "Greek Orthodoxy, the Ecumenical Patriarchate and the Church in the USA", St Vladimir's Theological Quarterly 54:3-4 (2010) 421-439]
- "Ecological and Inter-Generational Solidarity. Initiatives of the Ecumenical Patriarchate”, Solidaritat in der Krise (2012) 113-120
- "Primus sine Paribus: Answer to the Protein of the Moscow Patriarchate (scientific presence of the Theologians of Halki, " Vol. p. 147-155
- “Luther aus orthodoxer Sicht unter besonderer Berücksichtigung seiner 95 Thesen”, Evangelische Verlagsanstalt 1 (2016) 6-29
- "The other in the teaching of the Three Hierarchs" (Speech on the Feast of the Holy Three Hierarchs of the A.P.Th., January 30, 2014, in Moiseos ᾨdi, Special Volume in honor of the blessed Elder Moiseos of Hagioreitos, Hierapeid Grand Monastery of Vatoi, Saint Spring 2017, pp. 346–356
- "Die Beziehung zwischen Kirche und Staat in der Orthodoxen Überlieferung", in Martyrion to the Nations, Vol. Charistry to the Ecumenical Patriarch Mr. Bartholomew, A.P.Th. – School of Theology, Thessaloniki 2011, pp. 443–451

Eastern Orthodox Church titles
Preceded by Demetrios	Archbishop of America; 2019–present	Succeeded by Incumbent
