= Job Osacky =

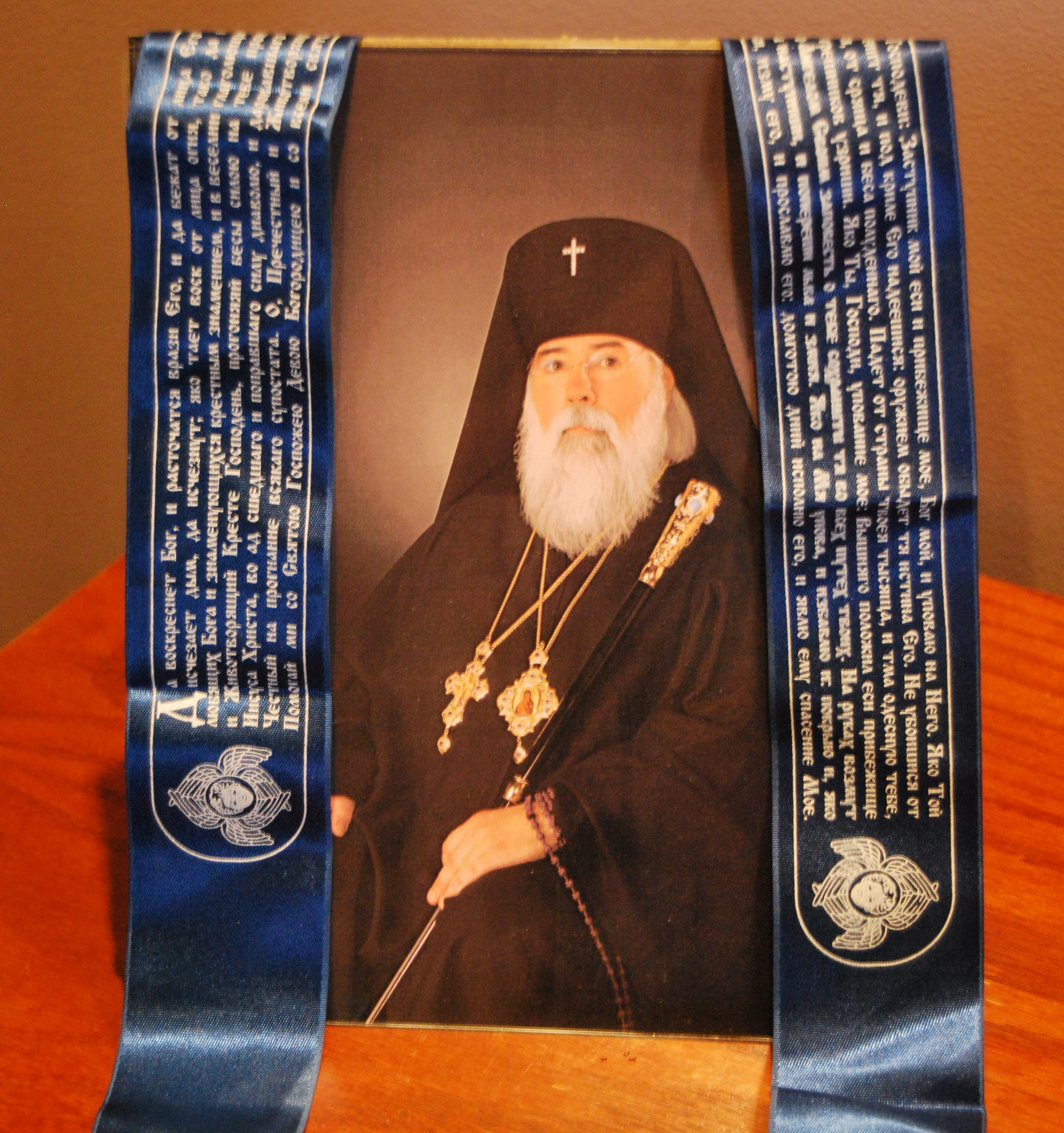
Tribute to Archbishop Job of Chicago at St. Paul the Apostle Orthodox Church, Dayton, Ohio.

Job Osacky (born Richard John Osacky; March 18, 1946 – December 18, 2009) was an American Orthodox prelates who served as Archbishop of the Midwest on the Orthodox Church in America until his death in 2009. His territory included Illinois, Indiana, Iowa, Kansas, Michigan, Minnesota, Missouri, North Dakota, Nebraska, Ohio, and Wisconsin.

== Biography ==
Archbishop Job was born Richard John Osacky in Chicago on March 18, 1946. Baptized and confirmed in the Catholic Church, he later attended an Eastern Orthodox church (formerly Eastern Catholic), Saints Peter and Paul Church, at 53rd Street and Western Avenue, as his home parish. He completed university studies at Northern Illinois University and, after graduating from Saint Tikhon's Orthodox Theological Seminary in 1970, he served as cantor and youth director at Saint John the Baptist Church in Black Lick, Pennsylvania. He assumed responsibilities in leading Divine Services in the prescribed manner for readers, conducting religious education and youth work, and writing icons.

In 1973, he was ordained to the diaconate and consequently to the priesthood by (then) Bishop Theodosius of Pittsburgh. He was assigned to the parish in Black Lick, where he also served as spiritual director for the Orthodox Christian Fellowship at nearby Indiana University of Pennsylvania. In 1975, he was blessed a riasaphor monk, and later was tonsured a monk in the Lesser Schema by (then) Bishop Herman in August 1982. In November of that year he was elevated to the rank of archimandrite.

The Diocese of New England nominated Job as their diocesan bishop. The Holy Synod of the Orthodox Church in America ratified the nomination and elected him Bishop of Hartford and the Diocese of New England. He was consecrated to the episcopacy on January 29, 1983, at All Saints Church in Hartford, Connecticut. At its session of November 5, 1992, the Holy Synod of Bishops elected Job as Bishop of Chicago and Diocese of the Midwest. He was enthroned as Bishop of his native city at Holy Trinity Cathedral on February 6, 1993.

In addition to his regular duties as the ruling hierarch of the Diocese of the Midwest, Job was recognized as an accomplished icon painter and an authority in the field. At the 17 March 2004 session of the Holy Synod, Job was elevated to the rank of archbishop. He died unexpectedly in the morning of December 18, 2009 in a hotel in Maumee, Ohio.

Eastern Orthodox Church titles
Preceded by ?	Bishop of New England; 1983–1993	Succeeded by Nikon (Liolin)
Preceded by Boris (Geeza)	Archbishop of the Midwest; 1993–2009	Succeeded by Matthias (Moriak)
