= Innocent Pustynsky =

American Orthodox vicar (b. 1868)

His Grace Innocent
- Vicar of Alaska and North America
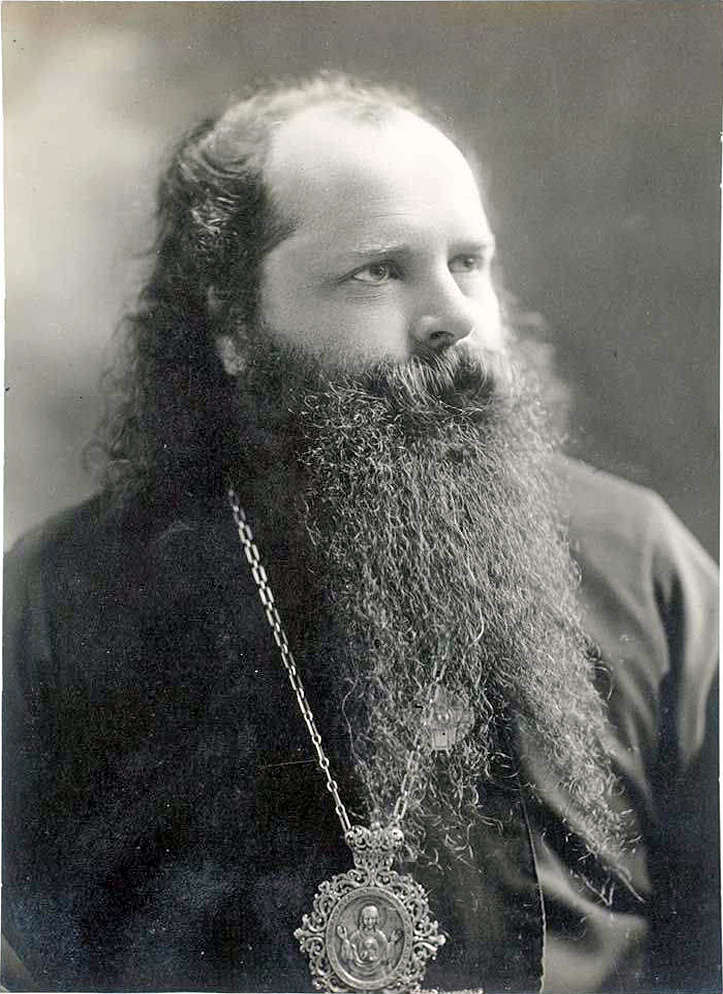
- c. 1903-1907
- Archdiocese: Vicariate of Alaska and North America
- See: Sitka
- Elected: 1903
- Predecessor: Position created
- Successor: Alexander (Nemolovsky)

Orders
- Consecration: 1904

Personal details
- Born: Alexander Dmitriyevich Pustynsky; September 23, 1868 Pustynya, Gryazovetsky District, Russian Empire
- Died: December 3, 1937 (aged 69) Alma-Ata, Kazakh Soviet Socialist Republic, Soviet Union
- Denomination: Eastern Orthodox
- Education: Vologda Tehological School

Innocent (Pustynsky) (Russian: Иннокентий Пустынский, romanized: Innokentiy Pustynskiy; September 23, 1868 - December 3, 1937), born Alexander Dmitriyevich Pustynsky (Russian: Алекса́ндр Дми́триевич Пусты́нский, romanized: Aleksándr Dmítriyevich Pustýnskiy) was an Eastern Orthodox bishop and the first vicar of the Vicarate of Alaska and North America, from 1904 to 1909 and the Metropolitan of Uzbekistan and Takshent from 1912 to 1922.

== Early life ==
Bishop Innocent was born Alexander Dmitriyevich Pustynsky in 1868 in the village of Pustynya. In his youth, he was orphaned and taken in under the care of the local priest, Vasily Avduevsky. Locals from the village assisted in paying for his education.

=== Bishop ===
After years of Metropolitan Tikhon trying to get auxiliary help from Moscow to assist with the rapidly growing diocese, Innocent was consecrated vicar bishop of the Alaska Vicariate in 1904. Metropolitan Tikhon moved the former seat of the Archdiocese of North America to San Francisco and placed the seat of the newly formed vicariate at its former location in Sitka.

During his tenure, he acted as assistance to then Archbishop of the Aleutian Islands and North America Tikhon in order for the latter to focus more on administering the diocese in the rest of America. He was instructed to oversee the Alaska Native and Creole parishioners. He was also present at the consecration of Saint Raphael of Brooklyn. Innocent also translated works into Tlingit and Alutiiq languages, and founded the Orthodox Temperance Society in Alaska.

He was succeeded in Alaska by Archimandrite Alexander Nemolovsky of Jersey City in 1909. In the following year he became the Bishop of Yakutsk and Vilyuy. From 1912 to 1922 he was the Metropolitan of Tashkent and Uzbekistan until he was forced to resign due to his criticisms of the new policies of the Soviet anti-religious legislation

Innocent was executed by order of the NKVD on December 3, 1937, in Almaty during the Great Purge. He was rehabilitated on April 12, 1989.

== See also ==
- Timeline of Eastern Orthodoxy in North America
- Persecution of Christians in the Soviet Union

== Notes ==
Eastern Orthodox Church titles
Preceded by Position created	Vicar of Alaska and North America; 1904 – 1909	Succeeded by Alexander (Nemolovsky)
