= Orthodox Church in America Diocese of the Midwest =

Diocese of the Orthodox Church in America

Coordinates: 43°N 92°W

Diocese of the Midwest

orthodox

Location
- Country: United States
- Territory: Midwestern United States
- Metropolitan: Tikhon (Mollard)

Statistics
- Parishes: Five Cathedrals, 54 full parishes, 10 missions, 9 chapels
- Members: 9,000 official members up to 20,000 active parishioners (2023)

Information
- Denomination: Eastern Orthodox
- Rite: Byzantine Rite
- Secular priests: 83 active priests, 63 active deacons and 30 retired priests
- Language: English, Church Slavonic, Russian, Ukrainian

Current leadership
- Parent church: Orthodox Church in America
- Archbishop: Daniel (Brum)

Map
- The states in which the Diocese of the Midwest has jurisdiction.

Website
- midwestdiocese.org

The Diocese of the Midwest is a diocese of the Orthodox Church in America (OCA). Its territory includes parishes, monasteries, missions, and chapels located in twelve states in the Midwestern United States – Iowa, Illinois, Indiana, Kansas, Michigan, Minnesota, Missouri, North Dakota, South Dakota Nebraska, Ohio, and Wisconsin. Its mother church is the Holy Trinity Orthodox Church in Chicago, Illinois. The diocesan chancery is located on North Wood Street also in Chicago.

== History ==
The diocese stands out as one of the most historic in the OCA with many parishes dating back to the late 1890s, the diocese was also the epicenter of the mass conversion of Eastern Catholic Americans to orthodoxy between the 1890s-1920s in much part thanks to the labors of the former Eastern Catholic priest St. Alexis Toth who brought more than 20,000 to the church by the end of his life. The first seminary was founded in 1905 in Minneapolis, Minnesota by Archbishop Tikhon. It was later relocated to Tenafly, New Jersey in 1912 until its closure in 1923 due to financial difficulties.

The diocese was originally founded on December 23, 1970, as the Diocese of Chicago and Minneapolis. On May 25, 1979, it was renamed to the Diocese of the Midwest.

== Membership ==
The diocese of the Midwest is under the omophorion of Archbishop of Chicago and the Midwest Daniel (Brum). There are more than a hundred full-time clergy under the Diocese including 83 active priests and 63 deacons, along with hundreds of part-time choir directors, subdeacons and readers. The diocese is also the largest non-ethnic diocese in the OCA in the continental United States and is the largest diocese in terms of active parishioners within the OCA.

The size of the Diocese is often a disputed topic. There is no official statistic by either the OCA as a whole or the Diocese, although there is a number put forward by Alexei Krindatch in "Orthodox Reality" In a 2020 census of Orthodox churches, of 9,166 adherents, 5,158 were regular attendees.

However, when asked about Krindatch's figure, Archbishop Daniel stated that not only was this number inaccurate, but Krindatch had never received any data, either from him or to his knowledge any member of the diocesan council. His Eminence however did state that the Diocese had "A little over nine thousand official members of the diocese, but the diocese actually served close to twenty thousand". The difference in number of official members versus actual weekly attendees being due to the large number of catechumen, and non OCA Orthodox Christians; Well these parishioners may participate in services, tithe and (in the case of non OCA Orthodox Christians), take communion, they are not considered members of the diocese. This is due to them (in the case of Catechumen) being unbaptized. In the case of non OCA Orthodox Christians because they are under the authority of another bishop and would have to formally come under the authority of the OCA to be counted as an official member of the diocese.

The increase in the number of catechumen can be attributed in large part due to the larger presence of Orthodox clergy and apologist on the internet drawing converts and in large part due to the decrease in the perceived "exclusiveness" that many formerly ethnic parishes had. The Increase in non-OCA Orthodox attending OCA parishes has a variety of reasons but the biggest is the recent influx of eastern Europeans to the diocese, especially Ukrainians.

== Deaneries ==
The diocese is grouped geographically into six deaneries, each consisting of a number of parishes. Each deanery is headed by a parish priest, known as a dean. The deans coordinate activities in their area's parishes, and report to the diocesan bishop. The current deaneries of the Diocese of the Midwest and their territories are:

- Chicago Deanery, consisting of two Cathedrals, fourteen Parishes, two Missions and four Chapels – Illinois, Indiana, and Wisconsin
- Cleveland Deanery, consisting of one Cathedral, fifteen Parishes, one Chapel and one Church camp – Ohio
- Kansas City Deanery, consisting of seven Parishes, four mission, two chapels and one female Monastery – Illinois, Kansas, Missouri, and Nebraska
- Indianapolis Deanery, consisting of five Parishes and one Mission – Indiana and Ohio
- Michigan Deanery, consisting of one Cathedral and five Parishes – Michigan
- Minneapolis Deanery, consisting of one Cathedral, eight Parishes, three Missions and two chapels – Iowa, Minnesota, North Dakota, and Wisconsin

== Bishops ==
- Theophilus (Pashkovsky) 1922–1931
- Paul (Gavrilov) 1933
- Leonty (Turkevich) 1933–1950
  - John (Garklavs) 1949–1957 locum tenens
- John (Garklavs) 1957–1978
- Boris (Geeza) 1978–1988
- Job (Osacky) 1993–2009
- Matthias (Moriak) 2011–2013
- Alexander (Golitzin) 2013–2014
- Paul (Gassios) 2014–2022
- Daniel (Brum) 2022–present

== See also ==
- St. Peter and St. Paul Orthodox Church
- Metropolis of Chicago
