= List of primates of the Orthodox Church in America =

This article is a list of primates of the Orthodox Church in America (OCA).

Prior to the early 1920s, all Russian Orthodox Christians on the North American continent were under the direct jurisdiction of the Russian Orthodox Church. This North American diocese (known by a number of names throughout its history) was ruled by a bishop or archbishop assigned by the Russian Church.

After the Bolshevik Revolution of 1917, communication between the Russian Orthodox Church and the churches of North America was almost completely cut off. In 1920, Patriarch Tikhon of Moscow (previously, 1898–1907, Bishop of "Alaska and Aleutian islands", after 1900 first Bishop "of North America", after 1905 Archbishop) directed all Russian Orthodox churches outside of Russia to govern themselves autonomously until regular communication and travel could be resumed. In addition, a handful of Orthodox communities that had been under the Russians but with a non-Russian background turned to Orthodox churches in their respective homelands for pastoral care and governance.

After declaring the autonomy of the North American Diocese (known as the "Metropolia") in February 1924, Archbishop Platon (Rozhdestvensky) became the first Metropolitan of All America and Canada. Since that time, the primate of the OCA has been known as Metropolitan of All America and Canada, in addition to his role as the archbishop of an OCA diocese. When the OCA (then known as the Russian Orthodox Greek Catholic Church in North America) was granted autocephaly by the Russian Church in 1970 (an act not recognized by all Orthodox jurisdictions), it was renamed the Orthodox Church in America, and the ruling Metropolitan was granted the additional title of His Beatitude.

Image	Name	Place of birth	Birth name	Jurisdiction	Dates of rule	Notes
	Joasaph (Bolotov)	Strazhkov, Kashinsky District	Ivan Ilyich Bolotov	Bishop of Kodiak, Auxiliary of the Irkutsk Diocese	1799	Joasaph was elected bishop in 1796, but news did not reach him until 1798. He returned to Irkutsk and was consecrated in 1799, but died during his return voyage to Alaska.
	Innocent (Veniaminov)	Anginskoye, Verkholensk District	Ivan (John) Evseyevich Popov-Veniaminov	Bishop of Kamchatka, the Kurile and Aleutian Islands	1840–1850	
	Innocent (Veniaminov)	Anginskoye, Verkholensk District	Ivan (John) Evseyevich Popov-Veniaminov	Archbishop of Kamchatka, the Kurile and Aleutian Islands	1850–1868	
	Peter (Ekaterinovsky)	Saratov Oblast	Theodore (Fyodor) Ekaterinovsky	Bishop of Novoarkhangelsk, Auxiliary of the Kamchatka Diocese	1859–1866	
	Paul (Popov)	Yeniseysk Province	Paul Popov	Bishop of Novoarkhangelsk, Auxiliary of the Kamchatka Diocese	1866–1870	With the Alaska Purchase in 1867, Alaska became a territory of the United States.
	John (Mitropolsky)	Kaluga, Russia	Stephen Mitropolsky	Bishop of the Aleutians and Alaska	1870–1877	
	Nestor (Zass)	Arkangelsk, Russia	Baron Nikolai Pavlovich Zass	Bishop of the Aleutians and Alaska	1878–1882	Following the death of Bishop Nestor in 1882, the Diocese of the Aleutians and Alaska fell under the jurisdiction of the Metropolitan of St. Petersburg until 1887.
	Vladimir (Sokolovsky-Avtonomov)	Senkovka, Poltava Oblast	Vasily Grigorievich Sokolovsky-Avtonomov	Bishop of the Aleutians and Alaska	1887–1891	
	Nicholas (Adoratsky)			Bishop of the Aleutians and Alaska	1891	Bishop Nicholas was transferred to another see before traveling to North America to assume his duties as ruling bishop.
	Nicholas (Ziorov)	Kherson Oblast	Michael Zacharovich Ziorov	Bishop of the Aleutians and Alaska	1891–1898	In 1898, Bishop Nicholas was transferred to Russia, to serve as Archbishop of the Diocese of Tver and Kashin.
	Tikhon (Bellavin)	Toropetz District	Vasily Ivanovich Belavin	Bishop of the Aleutians and Alaska	1898–1900	
	Tikhon (Bellavin)	Toropetz District	Vasily Ivanovich Belavin	Bishop of the Aleutians and North America	1900–05	Bishop Tikhon introduced many changes to the diocesan structure, including renaming it to the Diocese of the Aleutians and North America.
	Tikhon (Bellavin)	Toropetz District	Vasily Ivanovich Belavin	Archbishop of the Aleutians and North America	1905–1907	Bishop Tikhon was elevated to archbishop when the diocese was made an archdiocese in 1905. He returned to Russia in 1907.
	Platon (Rozhdestvensky)	Kursk Eparchy	Porphyry Theodorovich Rozhdestvensky	Archbishop of the Aleutians and North America	1907–1914	
	Platon (Rozhdestvensky)	Kursk Eparchy	Porphyry Theodorovich Rozhdestvensky	Metropolitan of All America and Canada	1922–1934	
	Evdokim (Meschersky)	Vladimir Diocese	Basil Mikhailovich Meschersky	Archbishop of the Aleutians and North America	1914–1918	Archbishop Evodkim returned to Russia and was appointed Archbishop of Nizhegorod in 1919.
	Alexander (Nemolovsky)	Volhynia Eparchy	Alexander Alexandrovich Nemolovsky	Archbishop of the Aleutians and North America	1919–1922	Archbishop Alexander left the United States in 1922, and was replaced by Metropolitan Platon.
	Theophilus (Pashkovsky)	Kiev Oblast	Theodore Nicholaevich Pashkovsky	Archbishop of San Francisco, Metropolitan of All America and Canada	1934–1950	Theophilus was elected as metropolitan after Metropolitan Platon's death in 1934.
	Leontius (Turkevich)	Kremenets	Leonid Ieronimovich Turkevich	Archbishop of New York, Metropolitan of All America and Canada	1950–1965	
	Irenaeus (Bekish)	Mezhirech, Lublin Province	John Bekish	Archbishop of New York, Metropolitan of All America and Canada	1965–1977	In 1970, the Russian Metropolia (also known as the Russian Orthodox Greek Catholic Church in North America) was granted autocephaly, and was renamed as the Orthodox Church in America.
	Sylvester (Haruns)	Daugavpils, Latvia	Ivan Antonovich Haruns	Archbishop of Montreal and Canada, Temporary Administrator of the Orthodox Church in America	1974–1977	Archbishop Sylvester was appointed as Temporary Administrator in 1974, and handled the day-to-day business of the Church for Metropolitan Irenaeus, whose health was failing.
	Theodosius (Lazor)	Canonsburg, PA	Frank Lazor	Archbishop of New York, Metropolitan of All America and Canada	1977–1980	
	Theodosius (Lazor)	Canonsburg, PA	Frank Lazor	Archbishop of Washington, Metropolitan of All America and Canada	1981–2002	Entered retirement after suffering a series of strokes on April 2, 2002.
	Herman (Swaiko)	Bairdford, PA	Joseph Swaiko	Archbishop of Washington, Metropolitan of All America and Canada	2002–2005	
	Herman (Swaiko)	Bairdford, PA	Joseph Swaiko	Archbishop of Washington and New York, Metropolitan of All America and Canada	2005–2008	Voluntarily resigned per the request of the Special Investigative Committee of the OCA on September 4, 2008. Archbishop Dmitri of Dallas served as locums tenens until a successor was named.
	Jonah (Paffhausen)	Chicago, IL	James Paffhausen	Archbishop of Washington and New York, Metropolitan of All America and Canada	2008–2009	Metropolitan Jonah was the first Metropolitan of the OCA who was not raised an Orthodox Christian.
	Jonah (Paffhausen)	Chicago, IL	James Paffhausen	Archbishop of Washington, Metropolitan of All America and Canada	2009–2012	Tendered resignation on Jul 6, 2012.
	Tikhon (Mollard)	Boston, MA	Marc R. Mollard	Archbishop of Washington, Metropolitan of All America and Canada	2012–Present	Metropolitan Tikhon is the second Metropolitan of the OCA who was not raised an Orthodox Christian.
