= Daniel Brum =

Hierarch of the Orthodox Church in America

Daniel The Most Reverend
- Archbishop of Chicago and the Midwest
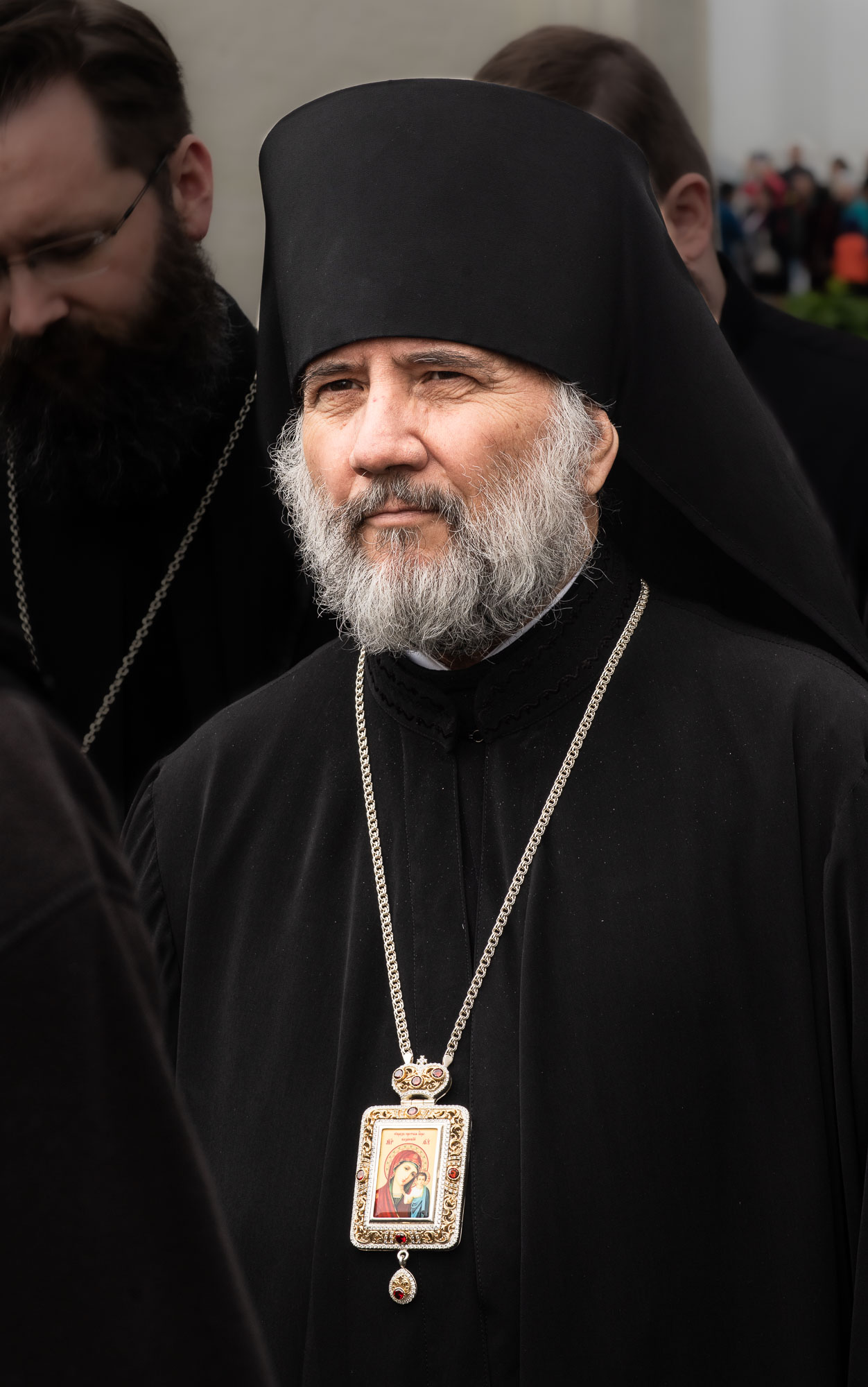
- Archdiocese: Orthodox Church in America Diocese of the Midwest
- See: Chicago
- Installed: July 18, 2022
- Term ended: Incumbent
- Predecessor: Paul (Gassios)

Orders
- Ordination: 1981
- Consecration: January 24, 2015

Personal details
- Born: November 16, 1954 (age 71) Fresno, California
- Denomination: Eastern Orthodox
- Education: Saint Patrick's Seminary and University; Catholic University of America

Archbishop Daniel of Chicago (secular name David Anthony Brum; born November 16, 1954) is the hierarch of the Orthodox Church in America, archbishop of the Diocese of Chicago and the Midwest.

== Early life and education ==
Daniel Brum was born David Anthony Brum in Fresno, California, on November 16, 1954, to Orville and Marjory Brum, the eldest son in a Roman Catholic family. He was raised in Riverdale, a Portuguese-American area, and graduated high school in 1973. He began reading the Church Fathers in the 1970s and tried to integrate his private study into his regular study.

Brum enrolled in St Patrick's College Seminary, Menlo Park, where he discovered the history of Orthodoxy and attended services at St Nicholas Church, Saratoga. He graduated with a Bachelor of Arts in humanities (specialising in history, philosophy and English literature) before entering Saint Patrick's Seminary in Menlo Park, graduating with a Bachelor of Arts in humanities in 1977 and a Masters of Divinity in 1981 before being ordained a Roman Catholic priest that same year. He served in a variety of capacities, including in the Portuguese-American community (and editor of the Portuguese-language page of the diocesan newspaper) and as diocesan Director of Vocations.

He was asked by his bishop to continue further studies in 1992, and, in 1995, received a licentiate of Canon Law (JCL) from the Catholic University of America, Washington, D.C. During this time, his relationship with Orthodoxy continued with his research, and his study of canon law brought him closer to Orthodoxy. He nevertheless returned to his diocese and was assigned to the Diocesan Tribunal and a small, rural mission parish.

== Conversion to Eastern Orthodoxy ==
It was his study of canon law that brought him into the Orthodox Church in America, and was received by vesting by bishop Tikhon (Fitzgerald) of San Francisco and the West at the Monastery of St John of Shanghai & San Francisco. He served at St Nicholas Church in Saratoga, California, until he was assigned to St Paul the Apostle Church in Las Vegas. He was transferred to the Diocese of New York and New Jersey in August 1998 and assigned rector of St Gregory Palamas Mission, Flemington, New Jersey. He was appointed Secretary to Metropolitan Theodosius (Lazor) in 2000, continuing his service under Metropolitan Herman (Swaiko). He also served on several Church committees and commissions, including those utilising his knowledge of canon law.

In December 2005, Brum asked to return to parish ministry, and in July 2006 he was transferred to the Diocese of the West and appointed Rector of Sts Peter and Paul Church, Phoenix. He was elected a member of the Diocesan Council in October 2006. On July 24, 2012, Brum was also appointed Dean of the Desert Deanery. On April 7, 2014, he was tonsured by Archbishop Benjamin (Peterson) at the Monastery of St John of Shanghai, receiving the name Daniel.

On October 21, 2014, he was canonically elected Bishop of Santa Rosa, to serve as Auxiliary Bishop to Archbishop Benjamin (Peterson) of San Francisco. He was elevated to Archimandrite on October 23, 2014, by Bishop Mark (Maymon). The following year, on January 24, 2015, at Holy Trinity Cathedral, San Francisco, Brum was consecrated Bishop of Santa Rosa by: Metropolitan Tikhon (Mollard); Archbishop Benjamin (Peterson) of San Francisco and the West; Bishop John (Roshchin) of Naro-Fominsk; Archbishop Nathaniel (Popp) of Detroit and the Romanian Episcopate, Archbishop Melchisedek (Pleska) of Pittsburgh and Western Pennsylvania; Bishop Michael (Dahulich) of New York and New Jersey; Bishop David (Mahaffey) of Sitka and Alaska; Bishop Paul (Gassios) of Chicago and the Midwest.

== Archbishop of the Midwest ==
On July 18, 2022, Holy Synod of OCA elected him as the bishop of the Diocese of Chicago and the Midwest. A three-day celebration took place in Chicago from September 30 through October 2, celebrating the feast of the Protection of the Most Holy Theotokos, and the enthronement of the twelfth hierarch of Chicago and the Diocese of the Midwest, Bishop Daniel. On November 11, 2022, he was unanimously elevated to the dignity of Archbishop by the OCA Holy Synod.

Eastern Orthodox Church titles
| Preceded by Paul (Gassios) | Bishop of the Midwest; 2022 – Present | Succeeded by Incumbent |
