= Orthodox Church in America Diocese of New England =

Diocese of the Orthodox Church in America

Diocese of New England

orthodox

Location
- Country: United States
- Territory: New England
- Metropolitan: Tikhon (Mollard)
- Denomination: Eastern Orthodox

Current leadership
- Parent church: Orthodox Church in America
- Bishop: Benedict (Churchill)

Map
- The states in which the Diocese of New England has jurisdiction.

Website
- www.dneoca.org

The Diocese of New England is a diocese of the Orthodox Church in America (OCA). Its territory includes parishes and missions located in six states in New England – Connecticut, Maine, Massachusetts, New Hampshire, Rhode Island, and Vermont. Benedict (Churchill) is the current bishop of the diocese.

The previous bishop of New England was the Right Reverend Nikon (Liolin), who was elected to the position of Bishop of Boston and the Albanian Archdiocese on October 22, 2003. He was installed as Bishop of Boston, New England, and the Albanian Archdiocese during ceremonies taking place from December 16–18, 2005. Archbishop Nikon died on September 1, 2019. The diocesan chancery during Archbishop Nikon's episcopacy was located in Southbridge, Massachusetts. On September 10, 2019, the OCA announced that Metropolitan Tikhon (Mollard) would be the locum tenens for the diocese until a successor was found. On December 2, 2023, Benedict (Churchill) was ordained as the Bishop of Hartford and the Diocese of New England at Holy Trinity Cathedral in Boston, Massachusetts.

== Deaneries ==
The diocese is grouped geographically into three deaneries, each consisting of a number of parishes and missions. Each deanery is headed by a parish priest, known as a dean. The deans coordinate activities in their area's parishes, and report to the diocesan bishop. The current deaneries of the Diocese of New England and their territories are:

- Boston Deanery – Eastern Massachusetts and Rhode Island
- Connecticut Deanery – Connecticut and western Massachusetts
- Northern Deanery – Maine, New Hampshire, and Vermont

== Bishops ==
- Ireney (Bekish) (14 June 1960 – 23 September 1965)
- Dmitri (Royster) (September 1972 – 1978)
- Job (Osacky) (29 January 1983 – 1993)
- Nikon (Liolin) (17 December 2005 – 1 September 2019)
  - Tikhon (Mollard) (10 September 2019 – 2 December 2023) locum tenens
- Benedict (Churchill) (2 December 2023 – present)
