= John Garklāvs =

Bishop of the Orthodox Church in America

Archbishop John (secular name Jānis Garklāvs in Latvian or Ivan Yakovlevich Garklav, Russian: Иван Яковлевич Гарклав in Russian; August 25, 1898 – April 11, 1982) was a bishop of the Orthodox Church in America. He served as Archbishop of Chicago and the Midwest from 1957 until his retirement in 1978. He is remembered for safeguarding the Tikhvin Icon of the Mother of Our God after World War II.

== Life ==
He was born in Umurga Parish, in the Kreis Wolmar of the Governorate of Livonia (today in Latvia), on August 25, 1898. His father died when he was two years old, leaving his widowed mother to care for him and his two younger brothers. His mother, a gifted singer, did not remarry.

Abp. John grew up in the small provincial town Limbaži, located about 80 miles from Riga. He attended school in the village and took active part in the Latvian Orthodox Church as an altar boy and then as a psalomshchik. He attended the Riga Theological Seminary, from which he graduated with honors.

On September 20, 1936, metropolitan Augustine (Pētersons) of Riga ordained him a deacon. On September 27 of the same year, Bishop James (Karps) of Jelgava ordained him a priest.

After Bishop Alexander (Vītols), formerly of Madona, died in Riga in 1942, Fr. John was elected Bishop of Riga. He was consecrated in 1943 after spending a period of time in preparation at the Holy Spirit Monastery in Vilnius.

The new bishop found himself caught in the turmoil of World War II attempting to care for the many people displaced by the war. As the Soviet forces came into Latvia in 1944, Bp. John, together with his mother and an adopted son, Sergei, was forced to leave Latvia with a small group of Latvian priests. The group took refuge in southern Czechoslovakia and eventually arrived in West Germany with the help of American soldiers. In West Germany, Bp. John encouraged the Orthodox Christians to organize parishes in "Displaced Persons" camps.

Bp. John arrived in the United States on July 22, 1949, after having petitioned metropolitan Theophilus (Pashkovsky) to accept him into the Metropolia. In October 1949, he was appointed Bishop of Detroit and Cleveland, and in 1955, he was appointed administrator of the Chicago-Minneapolis diocese. In 1957, he was confirmed as the ruling bishop of the diocese and raised to the rank of archbishop. Concurrently, the parishes previously under the Bishop of Detroit and Cleveland were transferred to the jurisdiction of the Bishop of Chicago and Minneapolis.

During his tenure as Archbishop of Chicago, Archbishop John served as senior bishop in the Holy Synod and as chairman of the Department of Music of the Metropolia, which became Orthodox Church in America in 1970. He remained Bishop of Chicago until his retirement in September 1978.

Archbishop Garklavs was a resident of Summit, a Chicago suburb. He reposed on April 11, 1982 in Chicago.

Eastern Orthodox Church titles
Preceded by Leontius (Turkevich)	Bishop of the Midwest; 1957 – 1978	Succeeded by Boris (Geeza)
