= Philip Stavitsky =

American Orthodox bishop

Philip
- Vicar of Alaska and North America
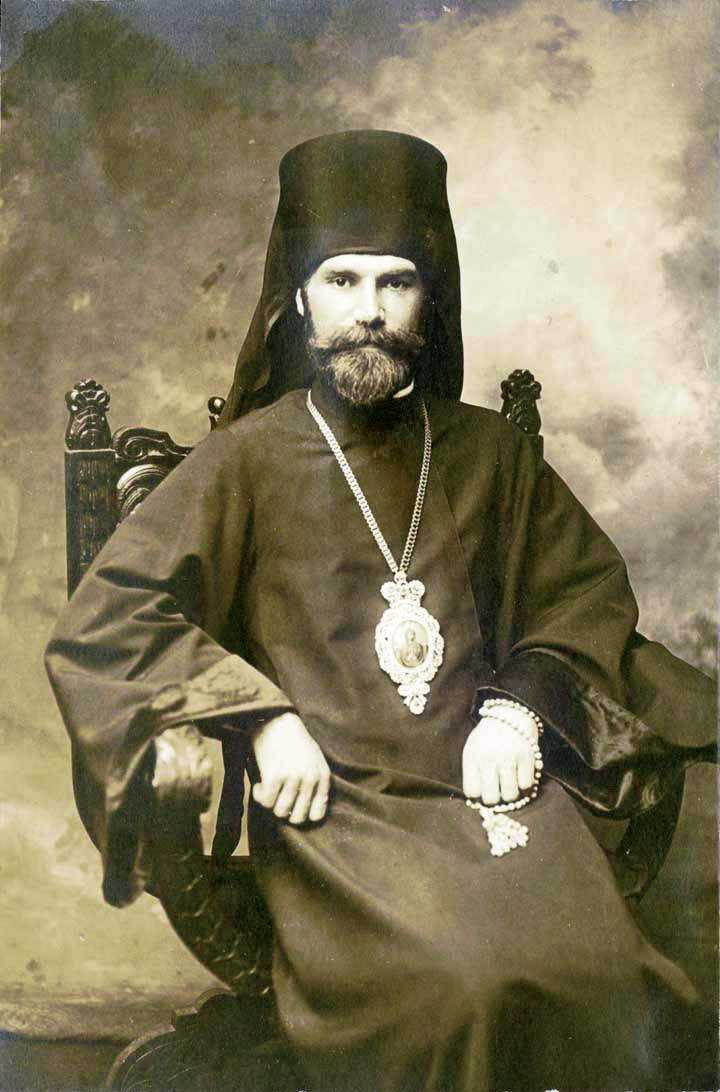
- c. 1916-1917
- Archdiocese: Diocese of Alaska
- Predecessor: Alexander (Nemolovsky)
- Successor: Amphilochius (Vakulsky)

Orders
- Ordination: 1910
- Consecration: August 19, 1916

Personal details
- Born: Vitaly Stephanovich Stavisky; April 14, 1884 Narodychi, Novograd-Volynsky Uyezd, Volhynia Governorate, Russian Empire
- Died: December 12, 1952 (aged 68) Moscow, RSFSR, Union of Soviet Socialist Republics
- Denomination: Eastern Orthodox
- Education: Moscow Theological Academy

Philip (Stavitsky) (Russian: Филипп (Ставицкий), romanized: Filipp (Stavickij); April 14, 1884 - December 12, 1952), born Vitaly Stephanovich Stavisky (Russian: Виталий Степанович Ставицкий, romanized: Vitalij Stepanovich Stavickij), was the archbishop of Astrakhan from 1928 to 1952. He was also archbishop of Smolensk from 1920 to 1928 and bishop of Alaska from 1916 to 1917.

== Early life ==
Philip was born as Vitaly Stephanovich Stavisky on April 14, 1884 in Narodychi, Russia, the son of a local priest. He graduated from the Moscow Theological Academy in 1910 and was consecrated in a monastery in Chernigov; in the following year, he was transferred to Kiev and resided at the Kiev Lavra of the Caves. In 1914, he was a hospital chaplain in the Russian Imperial Army. In 1915, Philip went to America as rector of a seminary, and was elevated to the rank of archimandrite. On August 19, 1916, Philip was consecrated Bishop of Alaska in New York. Although he would return to Russia the following year, he was still listed in sources as Bishop of Alaska up until 1919.

=== Return to Russia ===
On October 29, 1920 he was elected bishop of Smolensk. During the Red Terror and the USSR anti-religious campaign (1921-1928), Stavitsky was arrested and tried multiple times for possession of counter-revolutionary literature and ordaining priests of former officers of the White Army, and eventually deported to Samara until 1925. Later, in 1928, Stavitsky took the role of Archbishop of Astrakhan and Saratov until his death. Stavitsky was again arrested in 1930 and 1931 for counter-revolutionary activity, and sentenced to 3 and 5 years respectively. While imprisoned, he still continued to administer the diocese of Astrakhan. In 1937 he was released but arrested again and sent to exile until 1940. In 1944 he was appointed Archbishop of Irkutsk but was quickly called back to his original seat in Astrakhan.

Stavitsky died on December 12, 1952 in Moscow and was buried in the mausoleum of the Intercession Cathedral of Astrakhan.

== Orders and honors ==
- For Valiant Labour in the Great Patriotic War 1941–1945

== See also ==
- Timeline of Eastern Orthodoxy in North America

== Notes ==
Eastern Orthodox Church titles
Preceded by Alexander (Nemolovsky)	Vicar of Alaska and North America; 1916 – 1917	Succeeded by Amphilochius (Vakulsky)
