= Alexander Nemolovsky =

Russian Orthodox bishop (b. 1876)

His Eminence Aleksandr
- Archbishop of the Aleutians and North America
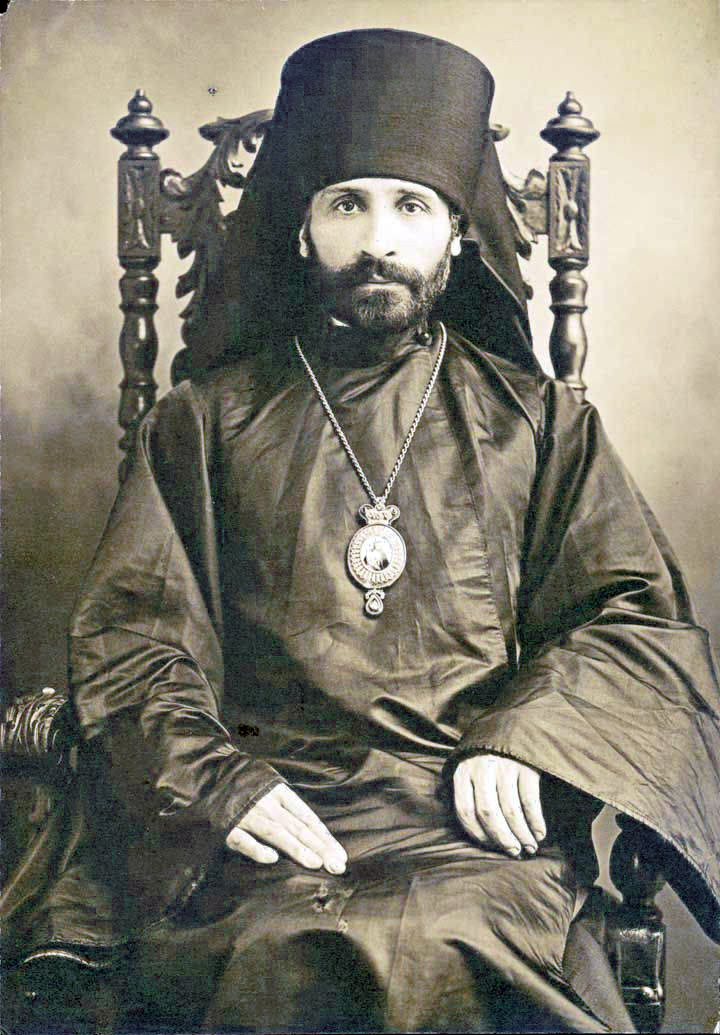
- Archdiocese: Archdiocese of the Aleutians and North America
- Elected: 1918
- Predecessor: Evdokim (Meschersky)
- Successor: Platon (Rozhdestvensky)

Orders
- Consecration: 1909

Personal details
- Born: Aleksandr Aleksandrovich Nemolovsky; August 30, 1876 Gulsk, Volhynia Governorate, Southwestern Krai, Russian Empire
- Died: April 11, 1960 (aged 83) Brussels, Belgium
- Denomination: Eastern Orthodox
- Education: Saint Petersburg Theological Academy

Alexander (Nemolovsky) (Russian: Александр (Немоловский), romanized: Aleksandr Nemolovskij; August 30, 1876 - April 11, 1960), born Alexander Aleksandrovich Nemolovsky (Russian: Александр Алексеевич Немоловский, romanized: Aleksandr Aleksandrovich Nemolovsky) was an Eastern Orthodox bishop and a vicar of the Vicarate of Alaska and North America, from 1909 to 1916, and later Archbishop of the Aleutians and North America from 1919 to 1922. He was also metropolitan of Brussels and Belgium from 1948 until his death in 1960.

== Biography ==
Alexander was born in Gulsk (in modern-day Zhytomyr Oblast, Ukraine) on August 30, 1876. In 1901, Alexander graduated from Saint Petersburg Theological Academy and was ordained a celibate priest. In may the following year, he was sent on a mission to Catasauqua, Pennsylvania to aid a parish with financial difficulties. In 1905 he was transferred to Reading, Pennsylvania, and the next year to Jersey City, New Jersey.

=== Life in America ===
Alexander was consecrated as Bishop of Alaska in 1909 in order to serve as auxiliary bishop to Archbishop Tikhon of America. He was transferred to the newly created title of bishop of Winnipeg and Canada in 1916 - he was succeeded in Alaska by Philip Stavitsky. In Canada, Alexander faced the question of whether the Ukrainian immigrants should have their own administration apart from the Russian church body, but eventually ruled against it. A few years later, a Ukrainian diocese was established independent of the North American mission.

Alexander was elected Bishop of America in 1919. His election was notable in that it was the first to be elected by both clergy and laity, setting the precedent in which all other Metropolitans of America have been elected through. Upon election, Bishop Alexander faced many challenges due to the aftermath of the Russian Revolution, and the financial situation of the Church's loss of funds from the Church of Russia.

In 1919, in response to a dispute over ownership of a church in San Francisco, Alexander suggested remortgaging the church in order to prevent it being auctioned off to the local Serb population. Doing so would keep the name of the church priest on the deed as opposed to exclusively the parish, and thus the Archdiocese maintaining ownership over the land, and in order to defend the national heritage of the church. In a corresponding letter, Archbishop Alexander responded "to give [the church] to the Serbs is absolutely impossible. This would be a crime".

Alexander has been criticized for his leadership of the church in the aftermath of the Russian Revolution. In order to help pay off the debt, Alexander would mortgage many of the local churches that were struggling. However, this only caused more debt and was unpopular with many traditionalist factions of the church. A local priest, Father John Kedrovsky, organized several members in the church and forced Alexander to resign, replacing him with close friend Metropolitan Platon Rozhdestvensky on June 20, 1922.

=== Archbishop of Belgium ===
In 1922, he went to study in Constantinople, however he fled in the aftermath of the Greco-Turkish war (1919-1922). He eventually arrived at Mount Athos in 1928, and then soon after settled in Belgium as auxiliary bishop. On December 11, 1936, he was confirmed as Archbishop of Brussels and Belgium. During World War II, in 1940 he was imprisoned in Berlin by Nazi authorities due to his outspoken criticism of Hitler. Alexander was released upon the capture of the city by Soviet forces and was proclaimed the Archbishop of Berlin and Germany. He resumed his responsibilities as Archbishop of Belgium on November 16, 1948, and was elevated to metropolitan on November 28, 1959.

Alexander died on April 11, 1960, at the age of 83.

== See also ==
- Timeline of Eastern Orthodoxy in North America
- Eastern Orthodoxy in Belgium
- White émigré

== Notes ==
Eastern Orthodox Church titles
Preceded by Innocent (Pustynsky)	Vicar of Alaska and North America; 1909 – 1916	Succeeded by Philip (Stavitsky)
Preceded by Evdokim (Meschersky)	Primate of the Orthodox Church in America; 1919 – 1922	Succeeded by Platon (Rozhdestvensky)
