= St. Peter and St. Paul Orthodox Church =

Church building in Burr Ridge, IL, USA

Coordinates: 41°45′51.9″N 87°55′00.1″W

St. Peter and St. Paul Orthodox Church in Burr Ridge, Illinois, is a parish of the Orthodox Church in America Diocese of the Midwest in the Chicago metropolitan area. It was founded as a Greek Catholic parish.

== History ==
The majority of parish founders were Carpatho-Russians formerly belonging to St. Mary's Greek Catholic Church, an Eastern Catholic parish. The desire to control parish property and retain what was then perceived as nasa Ruska Vira ("our Russian Faith") were the primary reasons for later shifting to Orthodoxy.

On August 3, 1931, Fr Peter Semkoff officially petitioned Metropolitan Theophilus, the local bishop of the Russian Metropolia, for his permission to establish a new parish in the Gage Park area of Chicago (2410 W 53rd St. Chicago, IL 60632), to be eventually known as St. Peter and St. Paul Carpatho-Russian Orthodox Greek Catholic Church. The first membership meeting was held on September 30, 1931, and on December 1, 1931, property for a new church was purchased on the northwest corner of Western Ave. and 53rd St. The first liturgy in the new church was celebrated on Palm Sunday, April 20, 1932.

After being spiritually served for over 50 years by Fr Peter Semkoff and his son, Fr Nicholas Semkoff, this once tight-knit ethnic enclave of southwest side Chicago parishioners vacated their original church and continued their parish life in a new church on County Line Rd. in Burr Ridge, Illinois. The new location was determined by the demographics of the parish members, who resided as far north as Racine, Wisconsin, and as far south as Bourbonnais, Illinois. The first service in the new church was held on February 15, 1998. The parish came to serve an English-speaking congregation representing many ethnic roots.

This article incorporates text from an article of the same name on orthodoxwiki.org, which see for attribution history. Orthodoxwiki is licensed under GFDL.
