= Holy Trinity Orthodox Cathedral (Chicago) =

Historic church in Illinois, United States

- Holy Trinity Russian Orthodox Cathedral and Rectory
- U.S. National Register of Historic Places
- Chicago Landmark
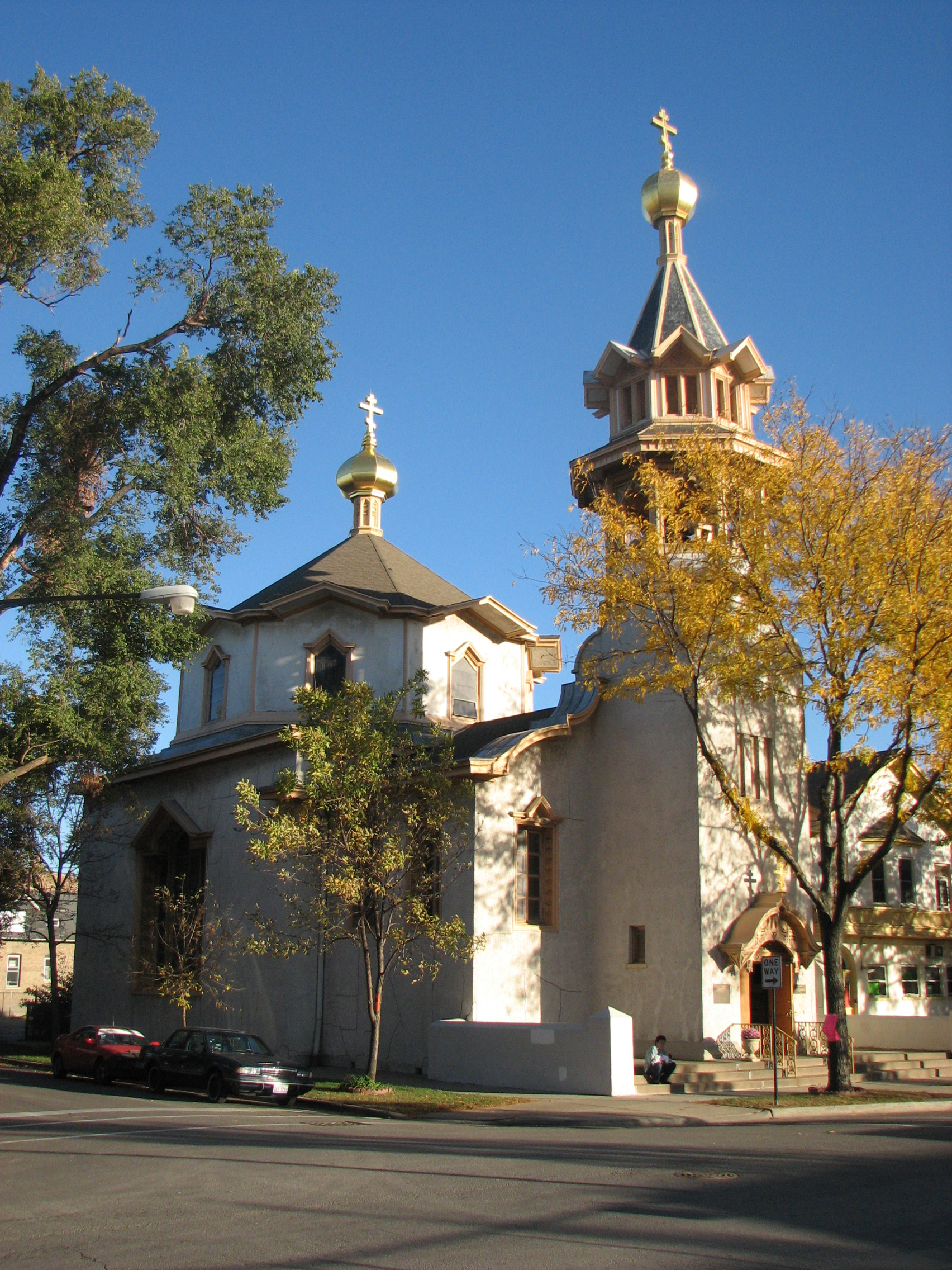
- Location: 1121 N. Leavitt Street; Chicago, Illinois
- Coordinates: 41°54′6.98″N 87°40′54.77″W
- Built: 1903
- Architect: Louis Sullivan
- NRHP reference No.: 76000693

Significant dates
- Added to NRHP: March 16, 1976
- Designated CHICL: March 21, 1979

Holy Trinity Orthodox Cathedral is the cathedral church of the Orthodox Church in America Diocese of the Midwest. It is one of only two churches designed by Louis Sullivan, one of the seminal architects of the late 19th and early 20th centuries. It is listed on the US National Register of Historic Places and is designated a Chicago Landmark.

== History ==
The church was commissioned by a growing Orthodox community consisting of Rusyns, Ukrainians, Russians, Serbs and Greeks of Chicago, Illinois, and stands within the neighborhood known today as Ukrainian Village. The founders of the church were immigrants from Carpathian Rus', Galicia, and the Balkans. It remains one of only two Orthodox churches serving the Orthodox-Christian community in Ukrainian Village. Construction work, partly financed by a donation of 4,000 rubles or ~$2,700 from Tsar St. Nicholas II of Russia, and Louis Sullivan donated part of his fee ~$1,250 and the elaborate Healy & Millet manufactured chandelier (value unknown). The church retains many features of Russian provincial architecture, including an octagonal dome and a frontal belltower. It is believed that the emigrants wished the church to be "remindful of the small, intimate, rural buildings they left behind in the Old World". Archival references point to a small wooden church in the Siberian village of Tatarskaya as a particular inspiration for the final design. To this traditional Russian basis of the overall design, Sullivan added decorative elements more characteristic of his own larger corpus of work, influenced by the Art Nouveau and Arts and Crafts movements, as seen, for example, in the decorative design over the western entrance to the church, the window and roof framing, and the bell tower and cupolas.

The church is highlighted in numerous books on church architecture, among them Chicago Churches: A Photographic Essay by Elizabeth Johnson (Uppercase Books Inc, 1999) as well as The Spiritual Traveler's Guide to Chicago and Illinois by Marilyn Chiat (HiddenSpring 2004). The church was consecrated by St. Tikhon of Moscow and was under the spiritual guidance of St. John of Chicago (Kochurov) during its early years.

The church was elevated to a cathedral in 1923, and stands today a member of the Orthodox community in Chicago. It serves as the cathedral church of the Diocese of Midwest of the Orthodox Church in America. Archbishop Daniel (Brum) is rector of the cathedral and archbishop of the diocese. Priest Alexander Koranda serves as Cathedral Dean.

== Services ==
The Divine Liturgy is celebrated at 9:30 am on Sundays, following singing of the Hours from 9:10 am. The Liturgy is also celebrated at 9:30 am on Feast days. Vigil is held at 5:00 pm on Saturdays.

== Tours ==
Tours are held almost every other Saturday or by special appointment.

== Gallery ==
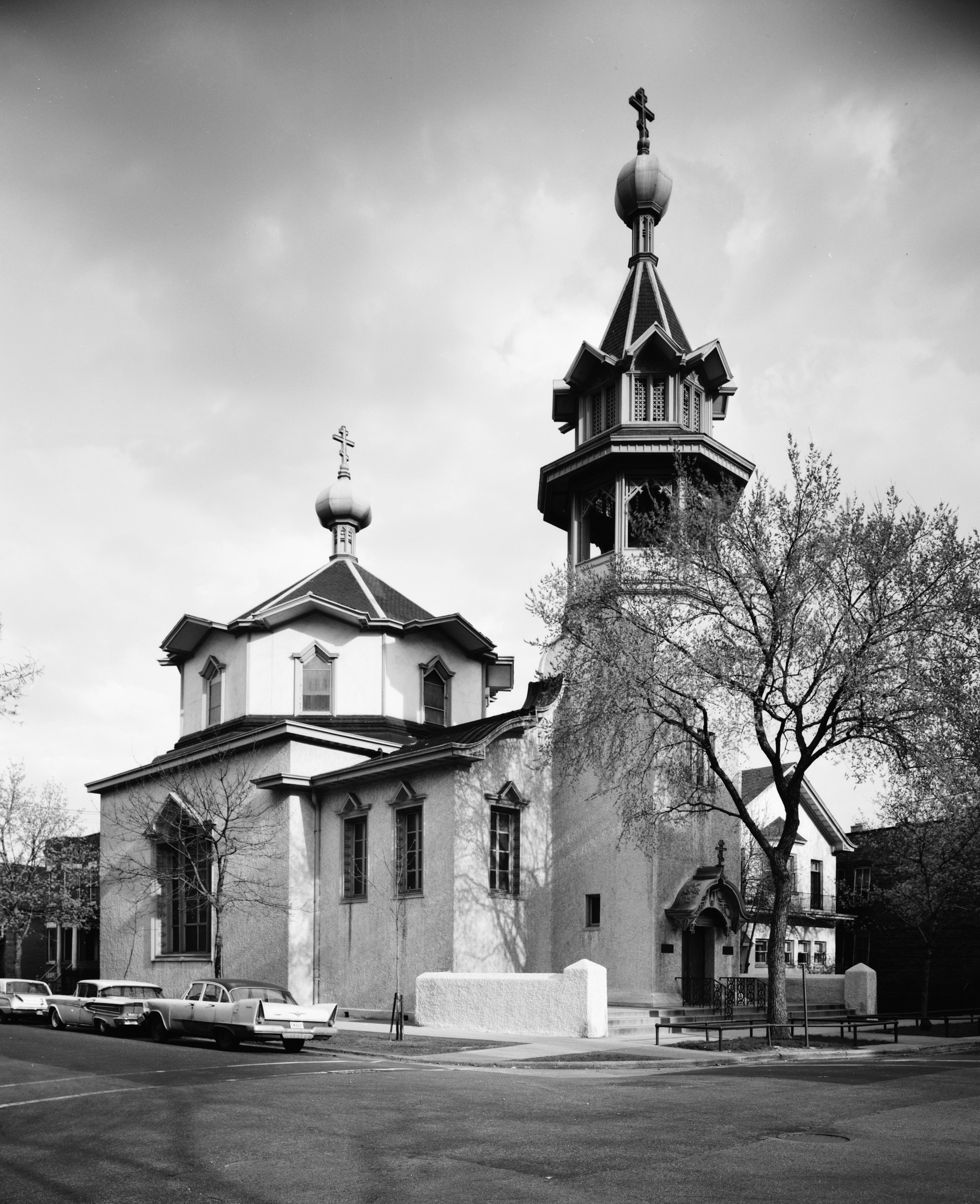
Holy Trinity Cathedral, exterior, Chicago, Illinois

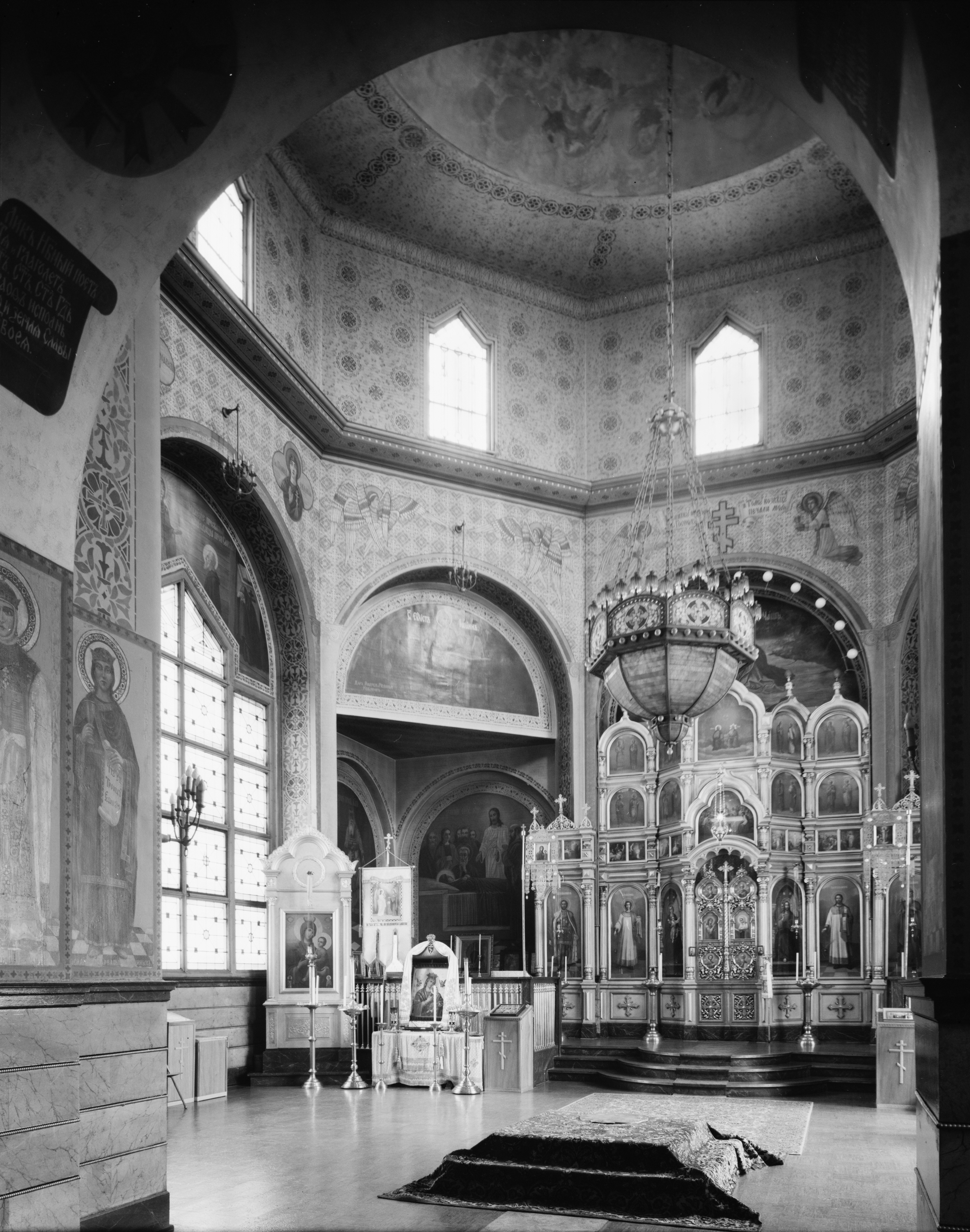
Holy Trinity Cathedral, interior, Chicago, Illinois

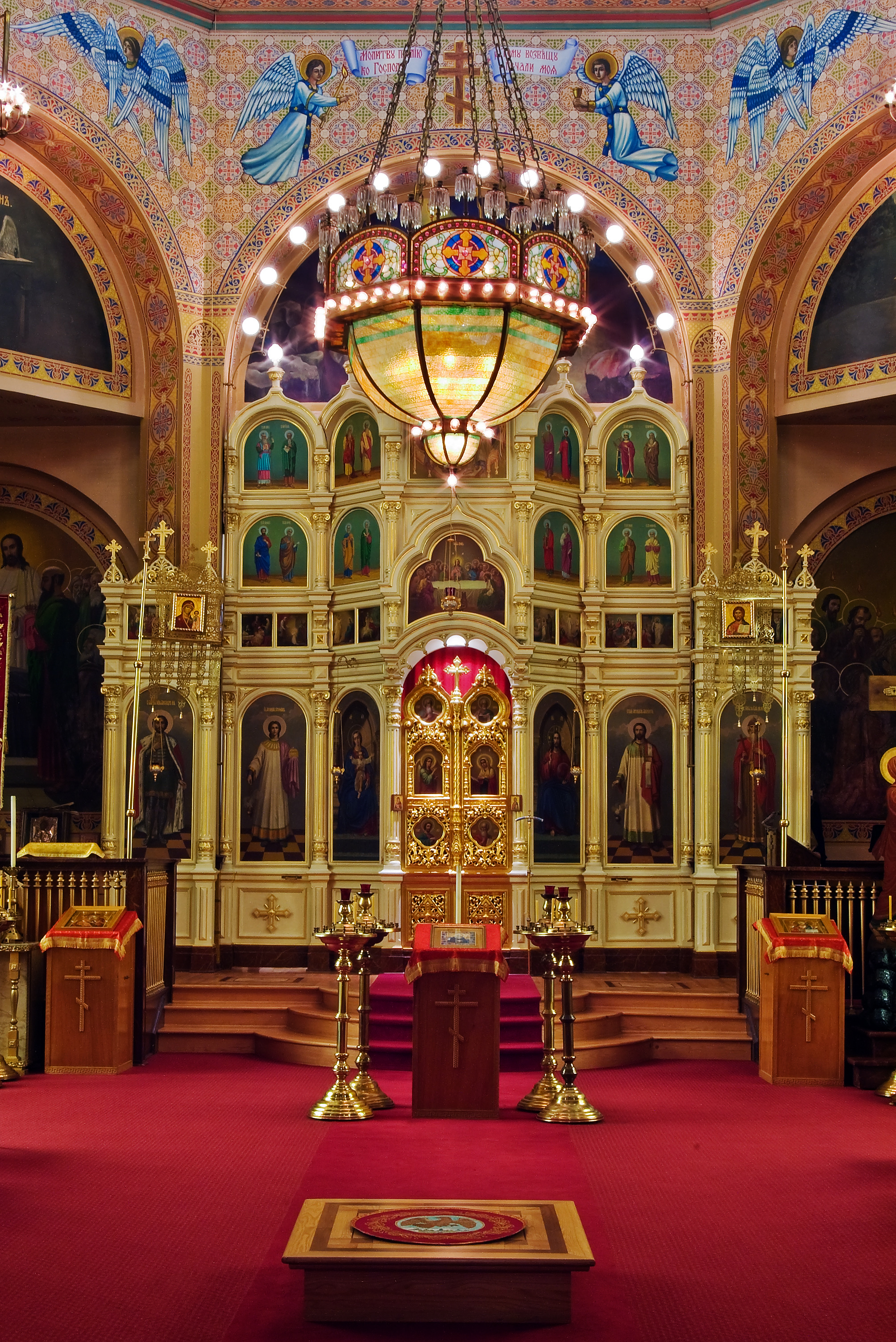
Interior showing the iconostasis

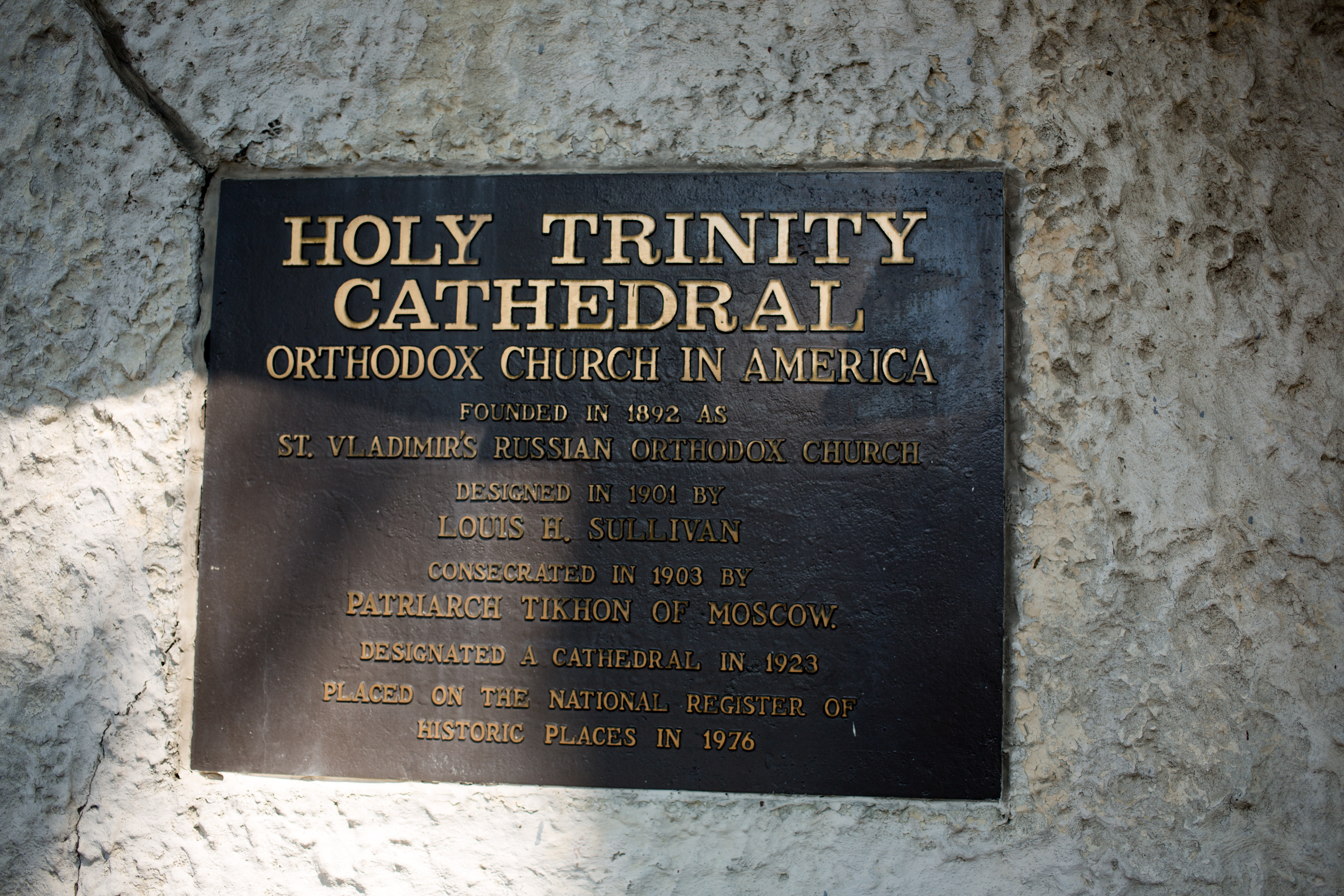

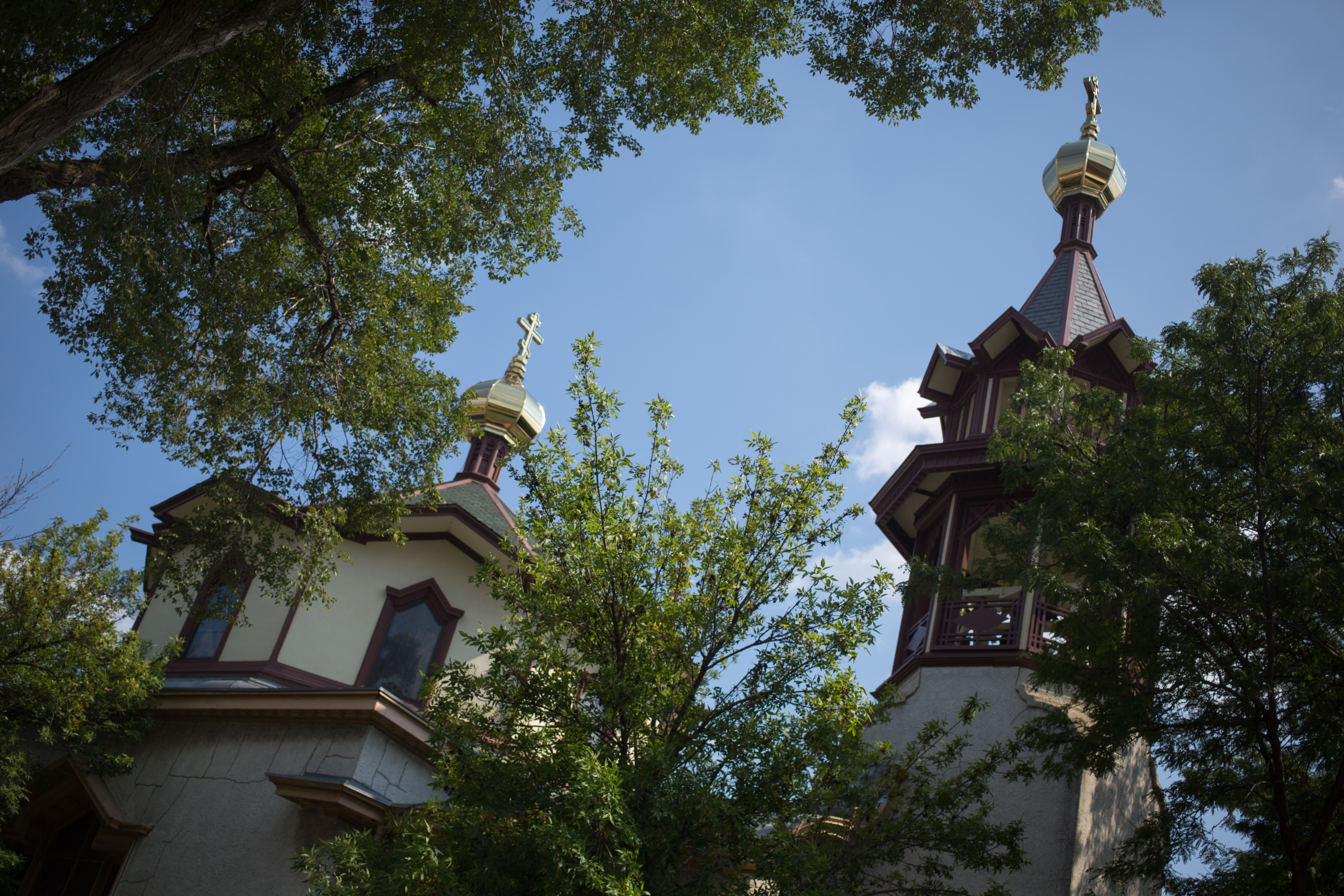

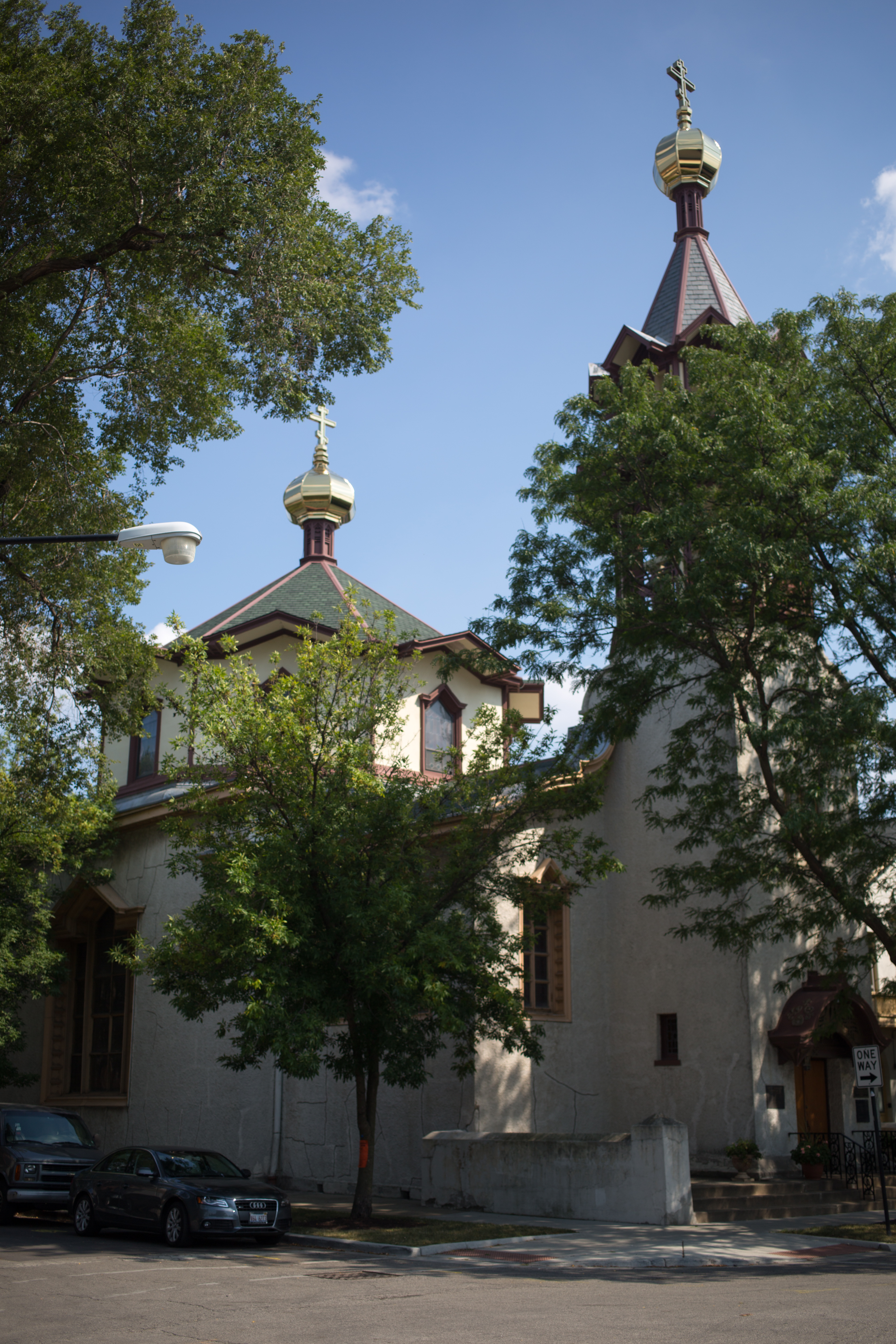

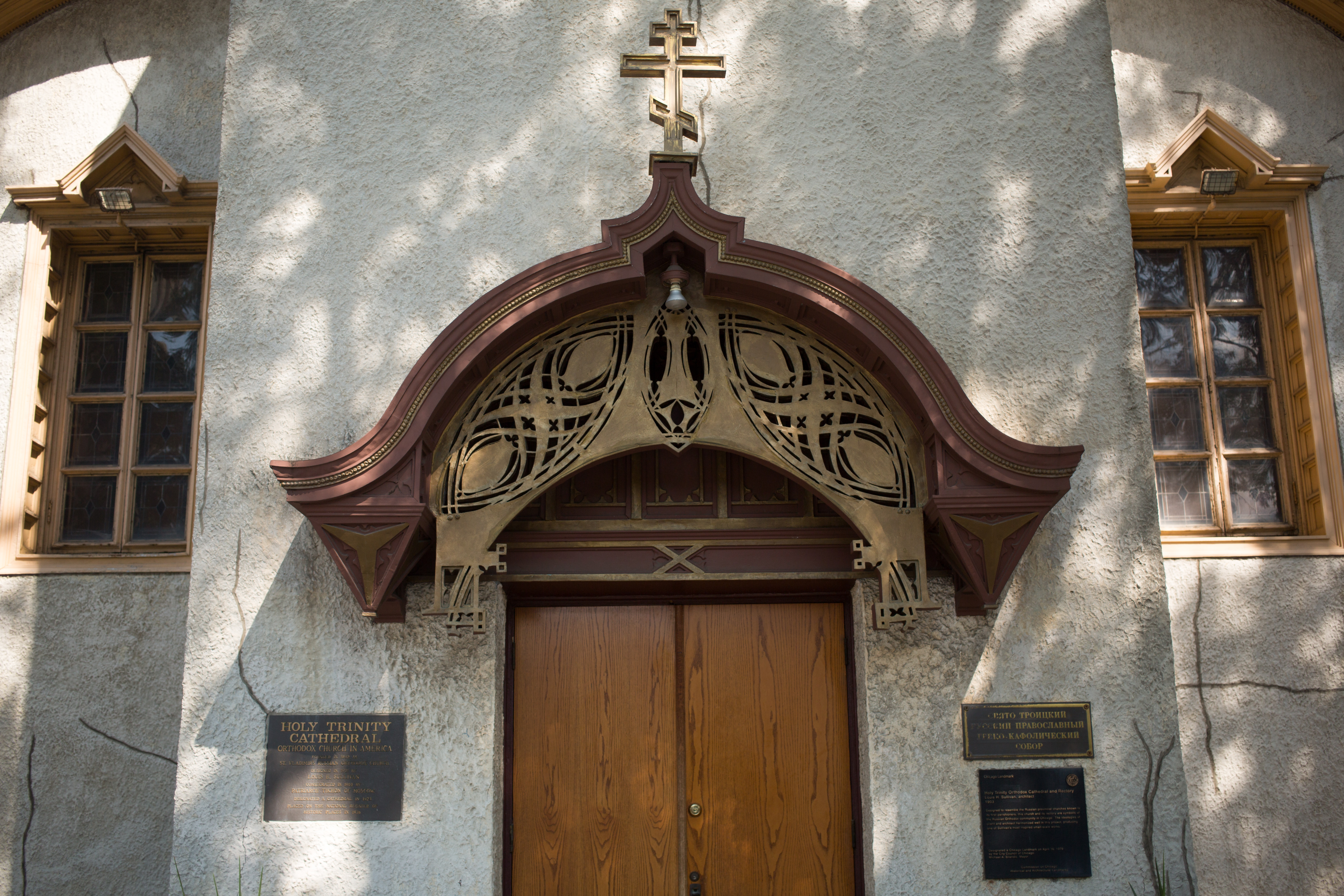

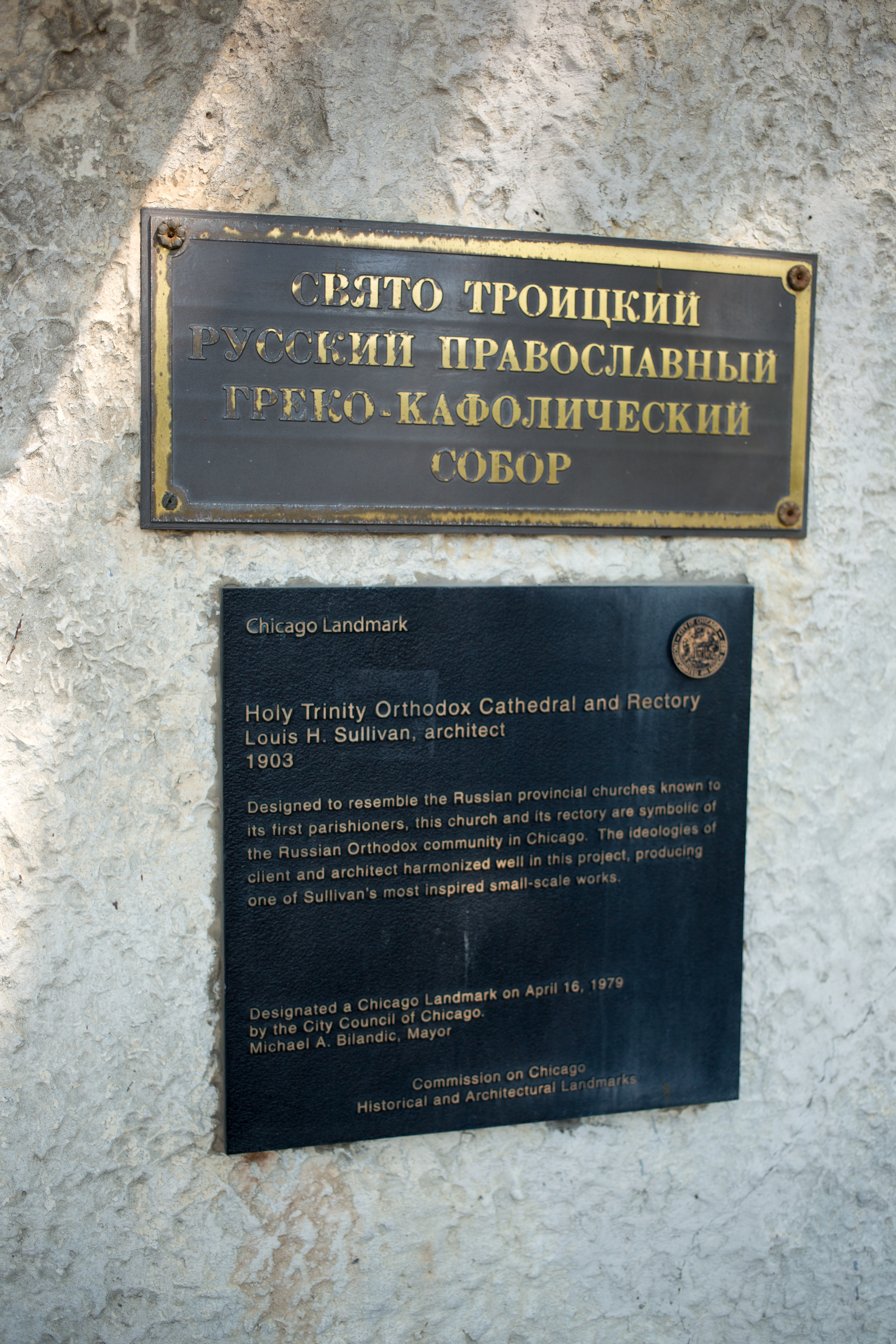

== See also ==
- National Register of Historic Places listings in Chicago
- List of Chicago Landmarks
