= Nikon Liolin =

His Eminence Nikon
- Archbishop of Boston, New England, and the Albanian Archdiocese
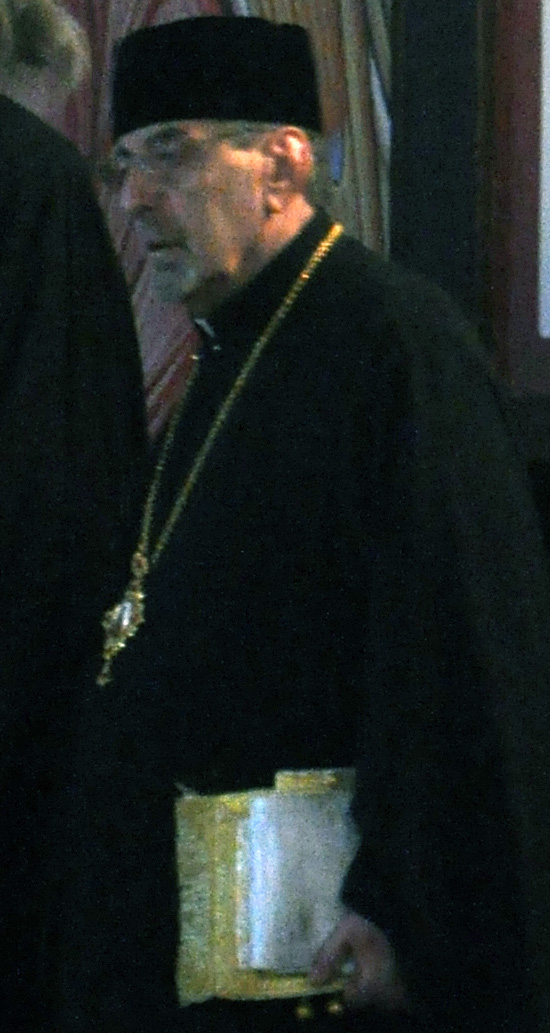
- Diocese: Diocese of Boston and New England, Albanian Archdiocese
- See: Boston
- Predecessor: Archbishop Job (Osacky) (New England), Archbishop Mark (Forsberg) (Albanian Archdiocese)
- Successor: Benedict Churchill
- Other posts: Formerly: Parish Priest (St. Nicholas Church, Cambridge, MA & St. Thomas Church, Farmington Hills, MI); Dean of the Great Lakes Deanery, Project Coordinator, "Voice of Orthodoxy", Russian Orthodox Layman's League; Editor, "The Vine", newspaper of the Albanian Archdiocese

Orders
- Ordination: July 5, 1969 (Holy Diaconate), July 6, 1969 (Holy Priesthood)
- Consecration: May 25, 2002, May 9, 2012 (elevation to Archbishop)

Personal details
- Born: Nicholas Liolin; October 9, 1945 New York, New York
- Died: September 1, 2019 (aged 73) Southbridge, Massachusetts
- Denomination: Eastern Orthodox, Orthodox Church in America
- Residence: Boston, Mass.
- Parents: Evan and Helena Liolin
- Spouse: Sarah Arthur (1967-2000, her death)
- Education: Saint Vladimir's Orthodox Theological Seminary

Archbishop Nikon (secular name Nicholas Liolin; October 9, 1945 – September 1, 2019) was an Albanian bishop who served as the head of the Orthodox Church in America's Albanian Archdiocese and New England diocese.

== Biography ==
Archbishop Nikon was born in New York City on October 9, 1945, the son of the late Evans J. and Helena P. Liolin. He was raised in a family nurtured in the Orthodox Christian faith and active in the Albanian Archdiocese of the Orthodox Church in America. His father had served as lay chairman and founder in 1947 of the Diocesan Theological Student Fund. For many years, his mother served as choir director at the family's home parish of Saint Nicholas, Jamaica Estates, New York. His brother John, now deceased, served on the parish council of Saint George Church, Trumbull, Connecticut, his brother Billy gave his life serving in the armed forces during the Korean War, while his youngest brother, James, served as lay chairman of the Jamaica Estates parish and member of the Archdiocesan Council's Student Fund. His elder brother, Father Arthur, is Chancellor of the Boston-based Albanian Archdiocese.

Archbishop Nikon pursued his elementary and secondary studies in New York City, where he developed an abiding interest in the theatre arts, securing leading roles in several high school productions, and in the biological sciences.

Tonsured to the Order of Reader by Metropolitan Theophan (Noli), Archbishop Nikon studied at Saint Vladimir's Orthodox Theological Seminary, Crestwood, New York; Iona and Concordia College, New Rochelle, New York; and the New School for Social Research and Political Science, New York City.

In 1967, he married Sarah Arthur, his childhood sweetheart. She served as choir director after his ordination to the Holy Diaconate by Bishop Stephen (Lasko) on July 5, 1969, and to the Holy Priesthood the following day. During his 33-year ministry Nikon served as rector of two parishes of the OCA's Albanian Archdiocese: Saint Nicholas Church, Southbridge, Massachusetts, and Saint Thomas Church, Farmington Hills, Michigan.

In addition to his pastoral ministry, Archbishop Nikon served as President of the Greater Detroit Council of Orthodox Churches and Chaplain for the Wayne State University Orthodox Christian Fellowship. He also administered a health and hospitalization insurance plan for area clergy. He also appeared on numerous live television and radio programs. He was a project coordinator for “The Voice of Orthodoxy”, established by New England's Russian Orthodox Layman's League, and he served as editor of “The Vine”, the newspaper of the Albanian Archdiocese, and Dean of the Great Lakes Deanery.

On July 25, 2000, his wife Sarah died of cancer. Metropolitan Theodosius presided at her funeral.

Prior to his consecration, Nikon spent time at Saint Tikhon's Seminary and Monastery, South Canaan, Pennsylvania, extending his studies, where he was tonsured to monastic orders prior to his episcopal consecration.

Archbishop Nikon was consecrated Bishop of Baltimore and Auxiliary to Metropolitan Theodosius on May 24 and 25, 2002, in conjunction with the annual pilgrimage to Saint Tikhon Monastery.

Nikon was nominated as Bishop of Boston at the Albanian Archdiocesan Assembly on October 10, 2003, and the Holy Synod elected him Bishop of Boston on October 22, 2003. He served as administrator of the Diocese of New England and was elected ruling bishop during the fall session of the Holy Synod in October 2005. He was installed with a new title as Bishop of Boston, New England and the Albanian Archdiocese by Metropolitan Herman at Holy Trinity Cathedral in Boston on December 16 and 17 2005. Bishop Nikon was elevated to Archbishop on May 9, 2012.

Nikon died September 1, 2019, in Southbridge, Massachusetts.

Eastern Orthodox Church titles
Preceded by Mark (Forsberg)	Bishop of the Albanian Archdiocese; 2003–2019	Succeeded by Nikodhim Preston
Preceded by Job (Osacky)	Bishop of New England; 2005–2019	Succeeded by Benedict Churchill
