= Financial scandal in the Orthodox Church in America =

American church financial scandal

The Financial scandal in the Orthodox Church in America was a significant crisis of governance that shook the leadership of the Orthodox Church in America from 2005 to 2008.

== Misuse of Church donations ==
In the autumn of 2005, the OCA administration was publicly accused of financial misconduct by its former treasurer, Protodeacon Eric Wheeler. Wheeler has alleged that millions of dollars in donations to the church were improperly used for personal expenses or to cover shortfalls in Church accounts.

=== Internal legal investigation ===
In response to these allegations, Metropolitan Herman announced in March 2006 that the law firm of Proskauer Rose LLP had been hired to conduct an internal legal investigation and an accounting firm had been hired to conduct audits. On March 16, 2006 Metr. Herman announced the dismissal of the church's chancellor, Protopresbyter Robert S. Kondratick.

At a December 2006 joint meeting of the OCA's Holy Synod of Bishops and Metropolitan Council, information concerning the investigation's results to date was presented. The presentation confirmed earlier allegations of financial abuse and a lack of internal financial controls.

The investigation into the alleged wrongdoings in the OCA administration led to the trial of the former OCA chancellor, Fr. Robert S. Kondratick, by the Spiritual Court and to his subsequent deposition from priesthood by the Holy Synod on July 31, 2007.

On September 3, 2008, the Special Investigative Committee of the OCA released a thirty-two-page report on the scandal. The report was presented to the Holy Synod and Metropolitan Council. The report found "an incredible failure at many levels to act responsibly". It also recommended "discipline" for 5 individuals. These individuals were former Metropolitans Herman (Swaiko) and Theodosius (Lazor), 2 former treasurers and a former comptroller.

Section III.C.19 of the report gives a tantalizing hint about the source of Kondratick's power. It states, "Several interviewees claimed that a significant source of Kondratick's apparent power over members of the HS [Holy Synod] and other clergy was his knowledge of their alleged personal moral failings, specifically with chemical addictions and sexual improprieties." The report goes on to say, "At least three sources informed the SIC [Special Investigative Committee] that both +MT [Metropolitan Theodosius] and +MH [Metropolitan Herman] affirmed that Kondratick had blackmailable material of a sexual nature about each of them."

== Resignation of Metropolitan Herman ==
The report recommended that Metropolitan Herman resign, retire or be defrocked. Before the report was released, Metropolitan Herman requested a medical leave of absence. The Metropolitan Council requested that the Holy Synod deny the request.

On September 4, 2008, the former metropolitan Herman voluntarily retired from his position as Metropolitan of the Orthodox Church in America.

After the voluntary resignation of former Metropolitan Herman, the OCA elected a new primate during its 15th All-American Council in November, 2008. This new primate, Metropolitan Jonah (Paffhausen), was elected just eleven days after his own consecration as a bishop. During the council, Metropolitan Jonah gave a speech that many regarded as gaining for him the position of Metropolitan. In this speech he directly addressed the controversies in the OCA.

After his election, he vowed changes and a departure from the direction he believed the financial scandal was taking the OCA. For months after his election, he proved to be an active primate, visiting many American Orthodox churches, and improving relations with other Jurisdictions/Primates, including the late Patriarch Alexy II of Moscow and his successor, Patriarch Kirill I of Moscow.
