= Al Federoff =

American baseball player (1924–2011)

- Second baseman
- Born: July 11, 1924; Bairdford, Pennsylvania, U.S.
- Died: August 2, 2011 (aged 87); Gilbert, Arizona, U.S.
- Batted: Right Threw: Right

MLB debut
- September 27, 1951, for the Detroit Tigers

Last MLB appearance
- September 28, 1952, for the Detroit Tigers

MLB statistics
- Batting average: .238
- Home runs: 0
- Runs batted in: 14
- Stats at Baseball Reference

Teams
- Detroit Tigers (1951–1952)

Alfred Federoff (July 11, 1924 – August 2, 2011), nicknamed "Whitey", was an American professional baseball infielder and manager. He spent his career in minor league baseball, except for 76 games spread over the 1951 and 1952 seasons, when he was a member of the Detroit Tigers of Major League Baseball.

== Biography ==
Federoff was born in Bairdford, Pennsylvania, and was Jewish. He attended Bairdford High School in Bairdford, Pennsylvania, graduated from Etna High School in Etna, Pennsylvania, and attended Duquesne University for two years. He threw and batted right-handed, stood 5 feet 11 inches (1.80 m) tall and weighed 165 pounds (75 kg) as an active player. His playing career extended from 1946 through 1959, with another decade spent as a minor league manager (1960–61; 1963–70). Most of his career was spent with the Tigers: he signed with Detroit in 1946, played for seven seasons in their farm system, and then managed in that system for nine more years during the 1960s. As a skipper, his teams won two league championships. He was a Tigers' scout in 1962.

For the MLB Tigers in 1951–52, Federoff played 71 games as a second baseman and batted .238 in 235 at bats, with no home runs and 14 runs batted in. He was a .279 hitter during his minor league career, where he saw service with the Triple-A Toledo Mud Hens, Buffalo Bisons and Louisville Colonels, and the Open Classification San Diego Padres and Seattle Rainiers. In 1954, he led the Pacific Coast League in runs (110), walks (108), and hit by pitch (11), was 8th in OBP (.389), was tied for 8th in stolen bases (15) and sacrifice flies (6), and was 10th in hits (175) while batting .278.

Preceded by Red Davis	Portland Beavers manager 1970	Succeeded by Ralph Rowe
