= Leontius Turkevich =

His Eminence Leontius Turkevich
- Bishop of Chicago; Metropolitan of All America and Canada
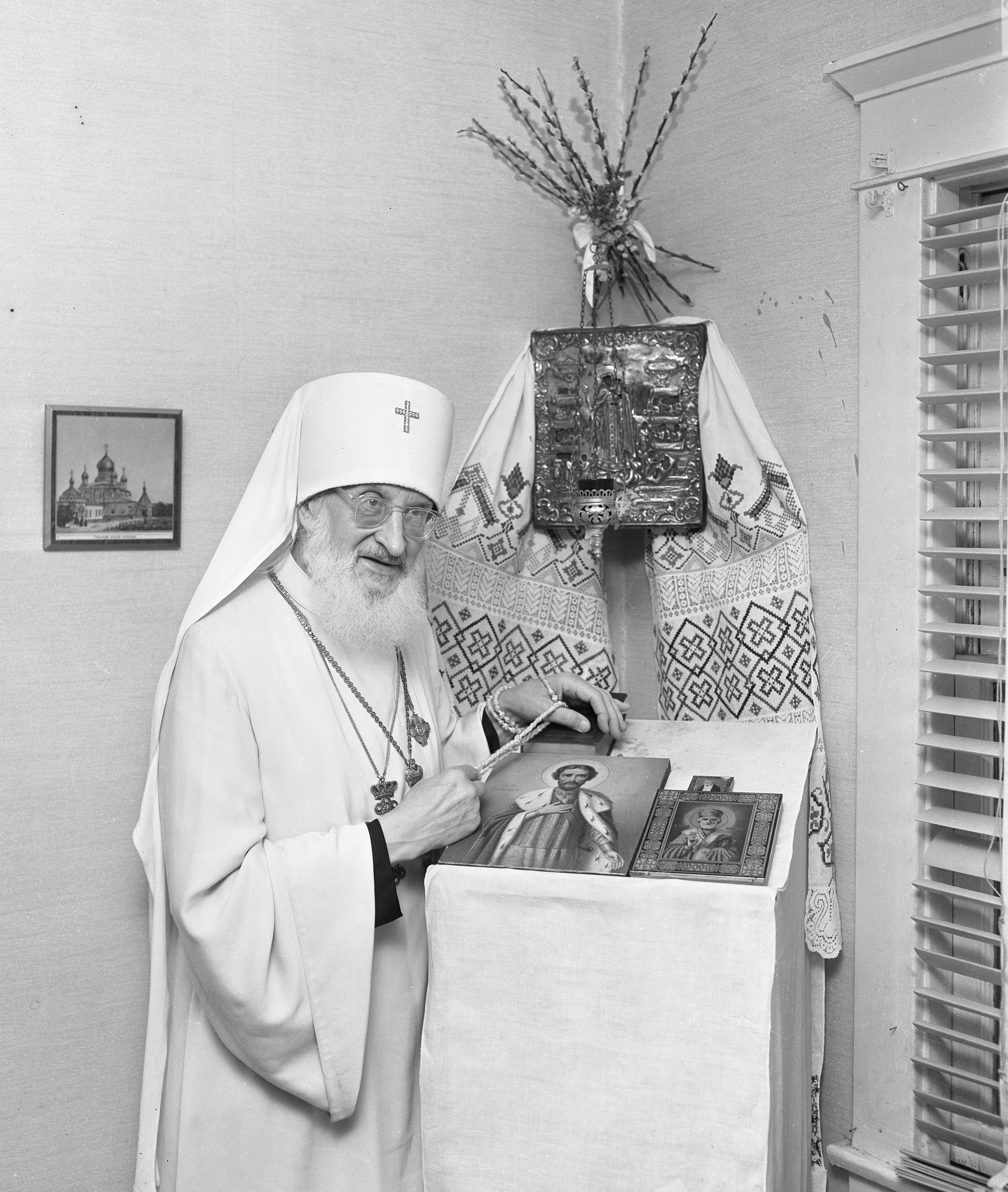
- Turkevich in 1952
- Church: Eastern Orthodox
- Metropolis: All America and Canada
- Elected: December 1950
- Term ended: 1965
- Predecessor: Theophilus Pashkovsky
- Successor: Irenaeus Bekish
- Previous post: Bishop of Chicago (1933–1950)

Orders
- Ordination: 1905
- Consecration: 1933

Personal details
- Born: 8 August 1876
- Died: 14 May 1965 (aged 88)
- Spouse: Anna Olympievna Chervinskaya (m. 1905; died 1925)
- Children: 5

Metropolitan Leontius (Leonty, secular name Leonid Ieronimovich Turkevich, Ukrainian: Леонід Ієронимович Туркевич; Russian: Леонид Иеронимович Туркевич ; August 8, 1876 – May 14, 1965) was the Metropolitan of the North American Diocese of the Russian Orthodox Church from 1950 until his death in 1965. He was succeeded by Metropolitan Irenaeus (Bekish).

== Life ==
Leonid Ieronimovich Turkevich was ordained to the priesthood in 1905, and succeeded his father as parish priest of Kremenets in Ternopil Oblast, western Ukraine. He was transferred, along with his family, to the United States in October 1906 and became the rector of the newly established Orthodox seminary (St. Platon's) in Minneapolis, Minnesota. Fr. Leonid represented the American diocese of the Russian Church at the All-Russian Church Council of 1917–1918 in Moscow, Russia.

Fr. Leonid, whose wife had died in 1925, was consecrated Bishop of Chicago in 1933. He was given the name Leonty during his tonsure as a monastic. Archbishop Leonty was elected Metropolitan of the diocese nearly unanimously during the 8th All-American Sobor, held in December 1950. He succeeded Metropolitan Theophilus Pashkovsky, who died in June 1950.

In July 1988, Metropolitan Leonty's granddaughter, Tamara Turkevich Skvir, donated 50 bound volumes of diaries and papers covering the period from 1906–1964 to the Library of Congress. The collection also included approximately 2,000 poems as well as other miscellaneous memoranda and historical documents.

He had five children. John Turkevich (1907 – 1998) was Eugene Higgins Professor of Chemistry at Princeton. Anthony L. Turkevich (1916 – 2002) was an American radiochemist. Nicholas L. Turkevich (1918 – 2007) was an international advertising executive.

== Notes and references ==
Eastern Orthodox Church titles
Preceded by Paul (Gavrilov)	Archbishop of Chicago; 1933–1950	Succeeded by John (Garklāvs)
Preceded by Theophilus (Pashkovsky)	Primate of the Orthodox Church in America; 1950–1965	Succeeded by Irenaeus (Bekish)

Academic offices
Preceded by Georges Florovsky	Dean of Saint Vladimir's Orthodox Theological Seminary; 1955–1962	Succeeded by Alexander Schmemann
