= Benedict Churchill =

Orthodox bishop of New England (born 1947)

His Grace Benedict The Right Reverend
- Bishop of Hartford and New England
- Archdiocese: Orthodox Church in America Diocese of New England
- See: Boston
- Elected: November 7, 2023
- Installed: December 2, 2023
- Predecessor: Nikon (Liolin)
- Successor: Incumbent

Orders
- Ordination: 2009 (diaconate); 2010 (priesthood)
- Consecration: December 3, 2023

Personal details
- Born: William Churchill; April 19, 1947 (age 79) Pottsville, Pennsylvania
- Denomination: Eastern Orthodox
- Education: St. John's University of Minnesota; Pontifical Institute of Mediaeval Studies; University of Toronto; St Vladimir's Seminary

Bishop Benedict (secular name William Joseph Churchill; born April 19, 1947) is the bishop of the Orthodox Church in America Diocese of New England since 2023.

== Early life and education ==
Benedict was born as William Churchill on April 19, 1947, the eldest of six in an Irish Roman Catholic household in Pottsville, Pennsylvania. He was baptized in St. Joseph's Roman Catholic Church in Locust Gap, Pennsylvania. He briefly became a benedictine monk while studying Byzantine and medieval history at St. John's University of Minnesota in 1969, where he received a Bachelors of Arts. He also obtained a licentiate of Mediaeval Studies from the Pontifical Institute of Mediaeval Studies in Toronto in 1975, a Ph.D. at the University of Toronto in 1979, and a Masters in Divinity from St Vladimir's Seminary in Yonkers, New York in 2010.

Benedict became interested in Eastern Orthodoxy during his studies as a student. He was received into the Orthodox Church on September 17, 1983 at St Mary's Orthodox Church in Stamford, Connecticut after the insistence of an orthodox friend.

Before becoming a priest, Benedict worked as an adjunct at Fordham University and New York University, and for Xerox Corporation from 1983 to 2006.

== Bishop ==
Benedict was elected Bishop of Hartford and New England on November 7, 2023, four years since the death of its previous bishop. He was consecrated on December 2, 2023.

Eastern Orthodox Church titles
Preceded by Nikon (Liolin)	Bishop of Boston and New England; 2023 – Present	Succeeded by Incumbent
