= Platon Rozhdestvensky =

Russian-American Orthodox bishop (1866–1934)

His Eminence Platon
- Archbishop of the Aleutians and North America
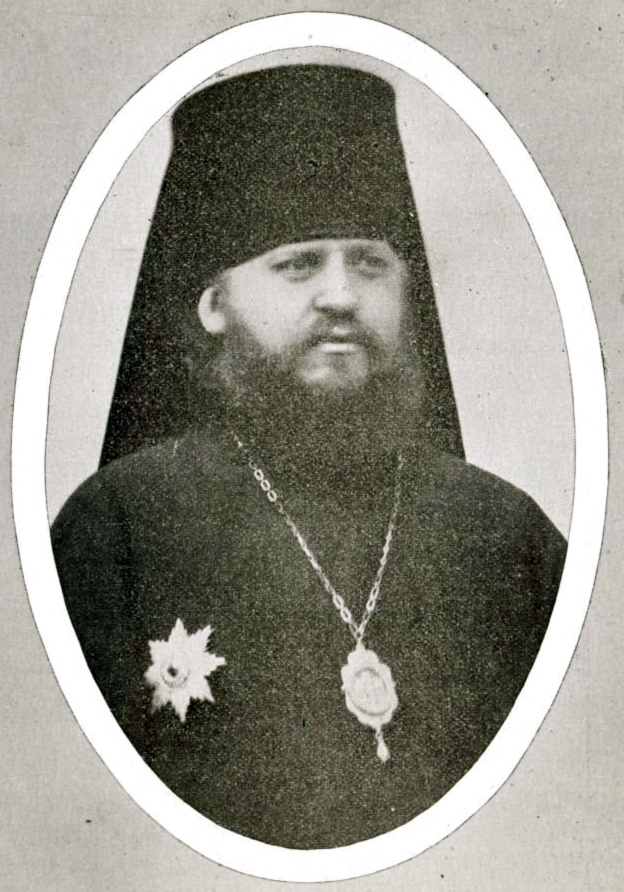
- c. 1907
- Archdiocese: Archdiocese of the Aleutians and North America
- In office: 1907–1914; 1922–1934
- Predecessor: Tikhon (Bellavin) (1907); Alexander (Nemolovsky) (1922)
- Successor: Evdokim (Meschersky) (1914); Theophilus (Pashkovsky) (1934)
- Other posts: Exarch of Georgia

Orders
- Ordination: January 6, 1887
- Consecration: June 3, 1902

Personal details
- Born: Porphyry Theodorovich Rozhdestvensky; February 11 [O.S. February 23] 1866 Kursk, Russian Empire
- Died: April 20, 1934 (aged 68) New York, New York
- Buried: Saint Tikhon's Orthodox Theological Seminary
- Denomination: Eastern Orthodox
- Spouse: (m. 1886; died 1891)
- Children: 1
- Education: Kiev Theological Academy

Platon Rozhdestvensky (Russian: Платон (Рождественский), romanized: Platón Rozhdestvenskij; February 11 [O.S. February 23] 1866 – April 20, 1934), born Porphyry Theodorovich Rozhdestvensky (Russian: Порфи́рий Фёдорович Рожде́ственский, romanized: Porfírij Fjodorovich Rozhdéstvenskij), was the Russian Orthodox Archbishop of the Aleutians and North America from 1907 to 1914 and again from 1922 to 1934. He was also remembered in Georgia as the last Russian Metropolitan of Georgia before its restoration of autocephaly in 1917.

== Early life ==
Platon was born as Porphyry Theodorovich Rozhdestvensky on February 11 [O.S. February 23] 1866, to a priest and his wife near Kursk, Russia. In 1886 he graduated from Kursk Seminary and in 1894 he enrolled in the Kiev Theological Academy where he took on the name Platon and graduated the following year, obtaining a Master of Theology in the same institution in 1898 and achieving the rank of archimandrite that same year. After graduation he continued to work at the university as professor, rector, and eventually dean.

== Bishop ==
On June 3, 1902, he was consecrated as Bishop of Chigirin, Auxiliary to the Bishop of Kiev. He worked as an editor and publisher to the magazine "Church and People", and was elected to the Second State Duma on February 12, 1907, due to his popularity amongst the locals in Kiev.

=== Arrival in America ===
Platon was elected as Archbishop of North America for the first time on June 8, 1907, where he would preside for the next seven years. He faced many challenges including a priest shortage, ethnic nationalism amongst the diaspora populations, and unpopularity of the church (in part due to resistance towards Russian hegemony). Platon's primary concern was the question of administering Ukrainian and Russian churches, and most ethnic missions were largely overlooked. In December 1908, he also founded the Russian Orthodox Christian Immigrant Society of North America, with the goal of protecting newly arrived immigrants from Austria-Hungary, Galicia, and Russia. In 1909, he was recalled to Russia briefly to serve on the Most Holy Synod.

Under Platon's leadership, efforts were made to nationalize the church. In February 1908, Platon organized an Albanian Orthodox Mission in America that included six parishes in Hudson, Massachusetts led by Bishop Fan Noli in response to the Hudson Incident, in which a petition was made by the local Albanian population after an independently owned Greek church refused to bury an Albanian nationalist. In 1909, a bill was vetoed by Governor Charles E. Hughes in the New York State Legislature after protests by the local Greek population. The law would have effectively placed the Greek parishes under Russian control. In a letter to Dean Pashkovsky discussing the possibility of a more unified church in North America, Platon expressed frustration with the Greek led opposition, stating "...it seems it [a unified leadership] is unfeasible when taking into consideration the self sufficiency of the Greeks...in all matters religion and faith". In 1913, a group of 19 Serbian churches briefly seceded until reconciliation was made in which the Russian delegation agreed to be more solicitous of Serbian complaints.

In 1912, he moved the first seminary in North America, St. Tikhon's, from Minneapolis, Minnesota to Tenafly, New Jersey in order to be closer to church administration; it was renamed St. Platon's Seminary. It was closed down in 1923 due to financial difficulties.

== Return to Russia ==
Upon his return to Russia, Platon was appointed Archbishop of Kishinev and Khotyn on March 20, 1914, before being transferred to the see of Kartalin and Kakheti on December 5, 1915. Platon remained there until the restoration of autocephaly of the Georgian Orthodox Church in 1917. On June 17, 1917, he was appointed the chairman of the missions department of the Holy Synod (lit. the council to Strengthen and Spread the Faith), and on August 13, 1917, to the rank of metropolitan with the title Metropolitan of Tiflis and Baku as well as Exarch of the Caucasus, unbeknownst to the council of the restoration of autocephaly of the Georgian church. Later, he served as bishop of Kherson and Odessa until having to flee due to the Russian Revolution in 1919.

Platon was a major participant in the All-Russian Council, and was considered as a candidate for Patriarchate of the Russian Church. During the council, Platon suggested appointing a Greek bishop "who has studied in a Russian theological institute" in North America. He was also given the task of negotiating with the Bolsheviks during the Russian Revolution; in a speech on March 12, he expressed support for the freedom of the average citizen but warned against any form of violence. Later, on July 15, 1917, he denounced Russian rebel soldiers that participated in the series of armed demonstrations, at a funeral for the Cossacks who were killed there, stating "A feeling of deep sorrow and grief is caused by the actions of those Russian soldiers who, under the influence of agitators, are ready to put an end to their duty to the homeland and love for it". In December 1917 he was elected to the Holy Synod and represented a delegation in Kiev in January 1918 in order to address the movement for autocephaly in Ukraine. On February 22, 1918, he was appointed ruling hierarch of his at then diocese of Kherson and Odessa.

=== Dispute with John Dudikoff ===
Platon first met Father John Dudikoff sometime in 1913, over a disagreement over finances. Dudikoff followed Platon to Russia where he claimed in an exposé to have witnessed various scandals of violence within the church, including adultery, homosexuality, orgies, embezzlement, prostitution and sexual assault. Platon was also accused of being a close advisor and friend of German ally Pavlo Skoropadsky and of instigating a pogrom while in Ukraine. Both sued each other in 1923 over these accusations.

== Second tenure in America ==
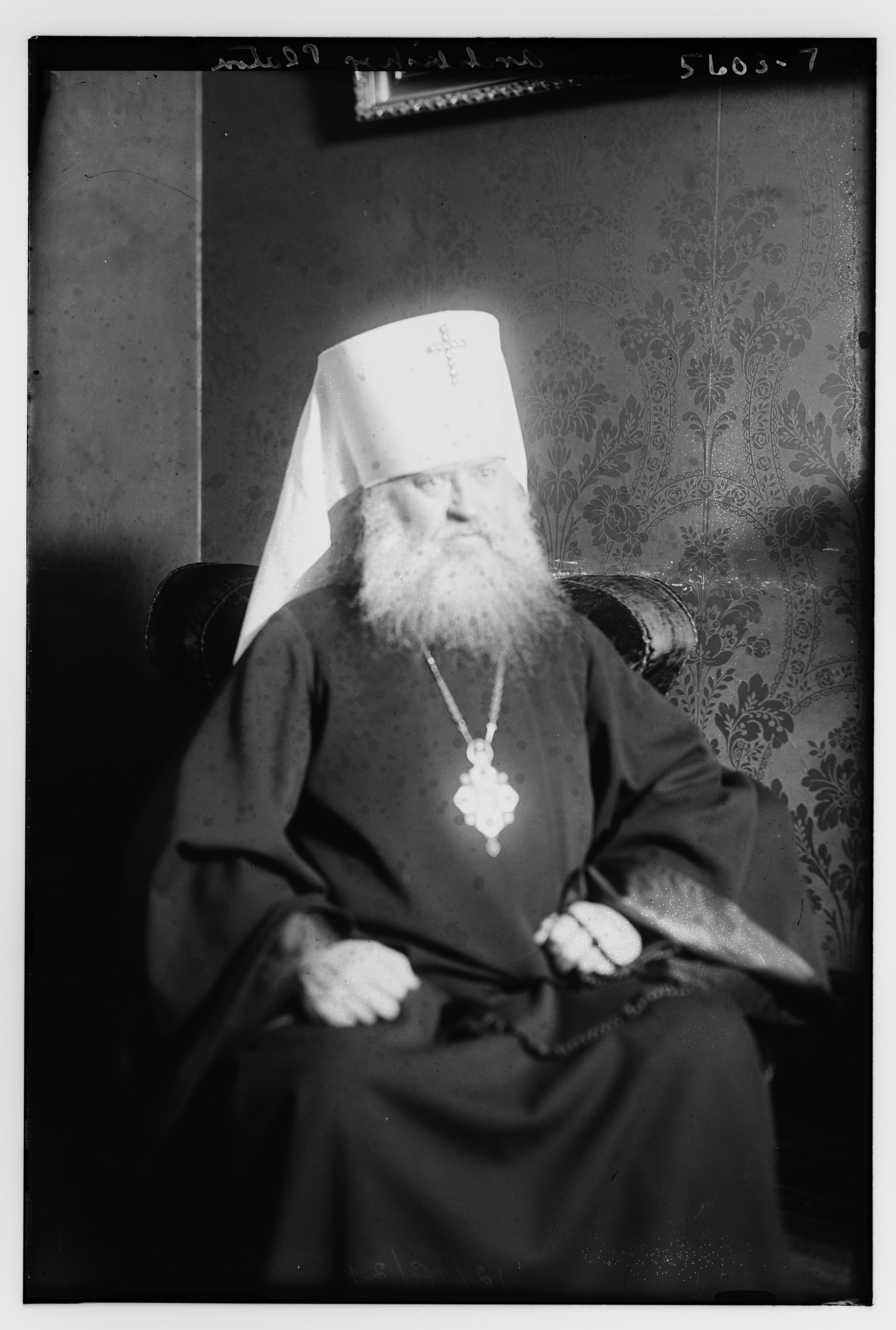
Metropolitan Platon in 1921

Due to the advances of the Bolsheviks in the Russian Civil War, Platon fled to America in 1919 as a refugee with his family. Facing resistance led by Father John Kedrovsky over the current bishop's alleged handling of church finances, Archbishop Alexander Nemolovsky in 1922 resigned and asked the Metropolitan to take over as the ruling hierarch of the diocese before leaving for Europe. After the Bolshevik Revolution, Patriarch Tikhon of Moscow in November 7 [O.S. November 20] 1920 directed all Russian Orthodox churches outside of Russia to govern themselves autonomously, and on November 9, 1922, he was confirmed in a sobor and established as the canonical Primate of North America; however this was contested by Kedrovsky in later years. While serving as Archbishop of North America, Platon was pro forma retired by Patriarch Tikhon of Moscow in order to satisfy Bolshevik demands, citing "counterrevolution directed against the Soviet state" and was ordered back to Russia for trial. However, Platon never returned and no trial was ever conducted in absentia, nor was a successor ever nominated by Tikhon. Since Platon was already Metropolitan of Odessa, he kept this title during his second reign. Consequently, the Archdiocese of North America was elevated to Metropolia status and enjoyed a considerable amount of freedom from the Moscow Patriarchate. Metropolitan Platon inherited many new difficulties from his predecessor, such as a financial crisis and uncertainty of the future of the Moscow Patriarchate. By 1921, all funds from Russia to the North American diocese had been terminated.

Another threat to the church was Kedrovsky's schismatic "Living Church". Kedrovsky, who was suspended as a priest by Nemolovsky in 1918, claimed to be the true successor to the Russian Church in America by claiming he derived his authority from the now Soviet controlled Russian Church, in contrast to Platon's anti-Bolshevik stances. Kedrovsky would use this claim to sue over a hundred church properties. While mostly unsuccessful, he achieved a major victory in 1925 when the US courts recognized him as the legitimate owners of St Nicholas Russian Orthodox Cathedral in New York City.

A second sobor was called on April 2, 1924, in Detroit, Michigan in which the North American diocese was declared "temporarily self-governing" due to difficulties in communication with the church in Russia. In later years, Platon would continue to rebuff affiliations with Russian Orthodox Church outside of Russia and the Moscow Patriarchate in order to maintain the diocese's independence. On June 29, 1926, Metropolitan Platon, along with Metropolitan Evlogy of Western Europe, left the Council of Bishops of the Russian Church Abroad after failing to obtain confirmation as head of the autocephalous American Orthodox Church. During his second tenure as hierarch, Platon was less amicable to movements to create a new, independent multi-ethnic church, and actively worked to undermine such efforts including any support for the newly established American Orthodox Catholic Church. Platon also faced many challenges to his own tenure; in 1925 Archbishop Adam Phillipovsky stormed Platon's residency with the assistance of a bomb squad from the Manhattan Police Department and physically threw the Archbishop out of the cathedral and onto the street. Phillipovsky would later be charged and arrested for contempt of court. In 1927, Patriarch Sergius's declaration of loyalty to the USSR, and on March 18 [O.S. March 30] 1927 ordered the resignation of Platon from the diocese of North America. In response, Platon declared autocephaly of the American Orthodox Church (later known as the Orthodox Church in America) on December 6 [O.S. December 19] 1927; this would eventually cause Sergius to place Metropolitan Platon on canonical interdict in 1933, preventing from serving as priest within the Soviet-controlled Russian Orthodox Church.

== Personal life and death ==
Platon was married in 1886. His wife gave birth to a daughter before dying in 1891; his daughter lived in Bulgaria with her family until the 1920s, where she eventually joined him in North America. On April 20, 1934, Platon died in New York, New York at the age of 68. He was buried at Saint Tikhon's Seminary. In 1946, on behest of supporters of Platon, Patriarch Alexy I posthumously performed a memorial service and lifted all ecclesiastical sanctions on him.

== Awards and honors ==
=== Russia ===
- Order of Saint Anna, 1st class
- Order of St. Andrew, with Diamonds
- Order of Saint Alexander Nevsky
- Order of Saint Vladimir, 1st class

=== Foreign ===
- Order of Prince Danilo I, first class (Montenegro)
- Order of Saint Alexander, first class (Bulgaria)

== See also ==
- List of primates of the Orthodox Church in America
- 1917–18 Local Council of the Russian Orthodox Church
- Renovationism
- White émigré

== Notes ==
Eastern Orthodox Church titles
Preceded by Tikhon (Bellavin)	Primate of the Orthodox Church in America; 1907–1914	Succeeded by Evdokim (Meschersky)
Preceded by Alexander (Nemolovsky)	Primate of the Orthodox Church in America; 1922–1934	Succeeded by Theophilus (Pashkovsky)
