= Pustynya, Nyuksensky District, Vologda Oblast =

Pustynya Пустыня
- Village
- Location within Vologda Oblast Location within Russia
- Coordinates: 60°14′N 43°56′E
- Country: Russia
- Region: Vologda Oblast
- District: Nyuksensky District
- Time zone: UTC+3:00

Pustynya (Russian: Пустыня) is a rural locality (a village) in Gorodishchenskoye Rural Settlement, Nyuksensky District, Vologda Oblast, Russia. The population was 151 as of 2002. There are 2 streets.

== Geography ==
Pustynya is located 58 km southwest of Nyuksenitsa (the district's administrative centre) by road. Khokhlovo is the nearest rural locality.
