= Irenaeus Bekish =

Polish-American Orthodox primate

His Beatitude Irenaeus Bekish
- Metropolitan of All America and Canada
- Metropolitan Ireney
- Church: Orthodox Church in America
- Metropolis: All America and Canada
- Elected: 1965
- Term ended: 1977
- Predecessor: Leontius Turkevich
- Successor: Theodosius Lazor

Personal details
- Born: Ivan Dmitriyevich Bekish; 2 October 1892 Międzyrzec Podlaski, Lublin Governorate, Russian Empire
- Died: 18 March 1981 (aged 88) Staten Island, New York
- Spouse: Ksenia Sokal

Metropolitan Irenaeus (Ireney, Russian: Ириней, secular name John Bekish, born Ivan Dmitriyevich Bekish, Russian: Иван Дмитриевич Бекиш, Polish: Jan Bekisz; 2 October 1892, Mezhirech, Lublin Province (now Poland) – 18 March 1981, Staten Island, New York) was the primate of the Orthodox Church in America (OCA) from 1965 until his retirement in 1977. He was succeeded by Metropolitan Theodosius (Lazor).

Metr. Ireney was involved in the negotiations that led to the granting of autocephaly in 1970 to the OCA, which had previously been under the jurisdiction of the Russian Orthodox Church. As the primate of a now-autocephalous Church, Metr. Ireney was granted the title of His Beatitude.

Eastern Orthodox Church titles
Preceded by Leontius (Turkevich)	Primate of the Orthodox Church in America; September 23, 1965 – October 25, 1977	Succeeded by Theodosius (Lazor)
