= Bairdford, Pennsylvania =

Unincorporated community in Pennsylvania, US

- Census-designated place
- Location in Allegheny County and state of Pennsylvania
- Coordinates: 40°37′52″N 79°52′53″W
- Country: United States
- State: Pennsylvania
- County: Allegheny
- Township: West Deer

Area
  - Total: 1.57 sq mi (4.06 km^{2})
  - Land: 1.57 sq mi (4.06 km^{2})
  - Water: 0 sq mi (0.00 km^{2})

Population (2020)
  - Total: 855
  - Density: 544.9/sq mi (210.37/km^{2})
- Time zone: UTC-5 (Eastern (EST))
  - Summer (DST): UTC-4 (EDT)
- ZIP code: 15006
- Area code: 724
- FIPS code: 42-03816

Bairdford is a census-designated place within the township of West Deer in Allegheny County, Pennsylvania, United States. As of the 2020 census, it had a population of 855 with a median age of 44. There are 692 people classified as white, three as black, three as combination White and American Indian. There are eight people who identify as Latino. The town was built to house coal miners.

== Demographics ==
Historical population
Census	Pop.	Note	%±
2020	855		—
U.S. Decennial Census

== Notable people ==
- Al Federoff, Major League Baseball player
- Herman (Swaiko), primate of the Orthodox Church in America
