= Theodosius Lazor =

American Eastern Orthodox prelate (1933–2020)

His Beatitude Theodosius
- Archbishop of Washington, Metropolitan of All America and Canada
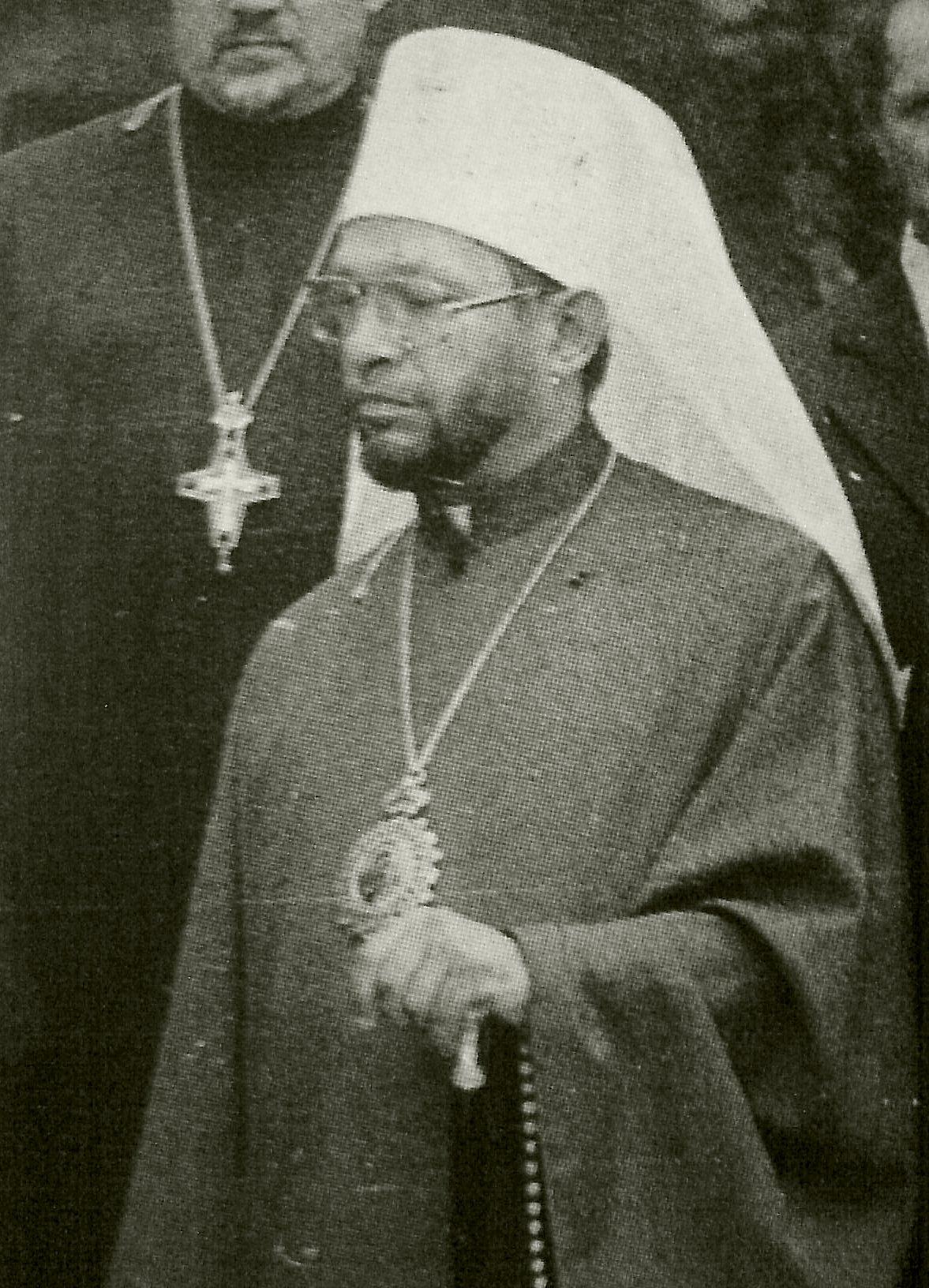
- Installed: October 25, 1977
- Predecessor: Metropolitan Irenaeus (Bekish)
- Successor: Metropolitan Herman (Swaiko)
- Other posts: Bishop of Alaska; Bishop of Western Pennsylvania

Orders
- Ordination: 14 October 1961
- Consecration: 6 May 1967

Personal details
- Born: Frank Lazor; 27 October 1933 Canonsburg, Pennsylvania, U.S.
- Died: 19 October 2020 (aged 86) Canonsburg, Pennsylvania, U.S.
- Buried: Orthodox Monastery of the Transfiguration Cemetery, Ellwood City, Pennsylvania
- Denomination: Eastern Orthodox
- Residence: Canonsburg, Pennsylvania, U.S.
- Education: Washington & Jefferson College; St. Vladimir's Orthodox Theological Seminary

Metropolitan Theodosius (secular name: Frank Lazor; 27 October 1933 – 19 October 2020, Canonsburg, Pennsylvania) was the primate of the Orthodox Church in America (OCA) from 1977 until his retirement in 2002. He was the first primate of the OCA who was born in the United States. On 2 April 2002, Metropolitan Theodosius (who had suffered a series of strokes) submitted a petition to the Holy Synod of the OCA, requesting his retirement. The Holy Synod granted his request, and announced an election for his replacement to be held on 22 July 2002, at the OCA's Thirteenth All-American Council in Orlando. He was succeeded by Metropolitan Herman (Swaiko).

On 19 October 2020, Theodosius died following an "extended illness" in his hometown of Canonsburg just 8 days shy of his 87th birthday. He was buried at the Monastery of the Transfiguration in Ellwood City, Pennsylvania.

== Notes and references ==
Eastern Orthodox Church titles
Preceded by Irenaeus (Bekish)	Primate of the Orthodox Church in America; 1977-10-25 – 2002-04-02	Succeeded by Herman (Swaiko)
