= Herman Swaiko =

American Eastern Orthodox bishop (1932–2022)

The Most Reverend Metropolitan Herman (Swaiko)
- Archbishop of Washington and New York
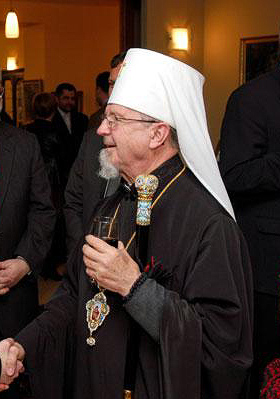
- Metropolitan Herman in 2004
- Installed: 8 September 2002
- Term ended: 4 September 2008
- Predecessor: Metropolitan Theodosius (Lazor)
- Successor: Metropolitan Jonah (Paffhausen)
- Other post: Deputy Abbot of St. Tikhon of Zadonsk Orthodox Monastery

Orders
- Ordination: April 1964
- Consecration: 19 February 1973

Personal details
- Born: Joseph Swaiko; 1 February 1932 Bairdford, Pennsylvania, U.S.
- Died: 6 September 2022 (aged 90)
- Denomination: Eastern Orthodox
- Education: Saint Tikhon's Orthodox Theological Seminary

Ordination history of Herman (Swaiko)
History
Diaconal ordination
- Date: March 1964
Priestly ordination
- Date: April 1964
Episcopal consecration
- Consecrated by: Ireney (Bekish)
- Date: 10 February 1973
Episcopal succession
Bishops consecrated by Herman (Swaiko) as principal consecrator
- Irineu (Duvlea): 2 November 2002
- Tikhon (Mollard): 14 February 2004
- Benjamin (Peterson): 1 May 2004
- Alejo (Pacheco-Vera): 28 May 2005

Metropolitan Herman (born Joseph Swaiko, 1 February 1932 – 6 September 2022) was the primate of the Orthodox Church in America (OCA). As the head of the OCA, he was the Archbishop of Washington and New York, and Metropolitan of All America and Canada. He was elected Metropolitan on 22 July 2002, replacing Metropolitan Theodosius (Lazor), who retired due to health problems related to a series of strokes.

== Biography ==
Joseph Swaiko was born 1 February 1932 in Bairdford, Pennsylvania, to Wasil and Helen Heridish Swaiko. He had nine siblings, all born between 1919 and 1933.

He completed his primary and secondary education in the West Deer Township school system, and enrolled in Robert Morris College. He graduated from Robert Morris with an associate degree in secretarial science. Upon graduation, he served as a company clerk in the United States Army Adjutant General's Corps, and was stationed in Labrador.

After his honorable discharge from the army in 1959, he enrolled at Saint Tikhon's Orthodox Theological Seminary. There, in 1961, he was appointed personal secretary to bishop Kiprian (Borisevich).

In March 1964, he was ordained as a deacon and, on 7 April 1964, was ordained a priest. Subsequently, he served on the seminary's administrative staff and was an instructor of Church Slavonic. He also served as Rector of St. John the Baptist Church in Dundaff and Sts. Peter and Paul Church in Union Dale, Pennsylvania.

He was tonsured as a monk on 4 December 1970, and received the name Herman in recognition of St. Herman of Alaska. On 17 October 1971, Herman was elevated to the rank of Igumen and was named Deputy Abbot of St. Tikhon of Zadonsk Orthodox Monastery. In October 1972, Herman was raised to the rank of Archimandrite.

On 10 February 1973, he was consecrated Bishop of Wilkes-Barre in his Cathedral Church of the Holy Resurrection and assigned as auxiliary bishop of the Philadelphia and Pennsylvania Archdiocese.

After the death of Archbishop Kiprian (Borisevich), Herman was elected Bishop of Philadelphia on 17 March 1981, and Rector of Saint Tikhon's Seminary in May 1982. In 1994, he was elevated to the rank of Archbishop. From May to September 2001, Archbishop Herman served as the temporary administrator of the OCA, while Metropolitan Theodosius was on a medical leave of absence.

=== Election to Metropolitan ===
On 2 April 2002, Metropolitan Theodosius (who had suffered a series of strokes) submitted a petition to the Holy Synod of the OCA requesting his retirement. The Holy Synod granted his request and announced an election for his replacement to be held on July 22, at the OCA's Thirteenth All-American Council in Orlando.

No candidate received the required two-thirds majority during the first round of voting, which necessitated a second round. During the second round, Bishop Seraphim of Ottawa and Canada received the majority of votes, but again not the required two-thirds. Subsequently, the Holy Synod decided to elect Archbishop Herman (Metropolitan Theodosius was selected in a similar manner in 1977, having not received a two-thirds majority of votes).

Archbishop Herman was enthroned on 8 September 2002, at a ceremony in St. Nicholas Cathedral in Washington, D.C.

After complaints of financial improprieties were lodged with the Holy Synod of the OCA, a Special Investigating Committee was established in October 2007 under the chairmanship of Bishop Benjamin of the West. (see Financial scandal in the Orthodox Church in America). The final report was issued in November 2008. It detailed numerous dubious transactions and poor accounting practices. It recommended the replacement of Metropolitan Herman. Aware of this coming recommendation, Metropolitan Herman retired in September 2008.

== Later life and death ==
Following his retirement Herman lived in a small residence on the grounds of St. Tikhon's Monastery. He died there on 6 September 2022 aged 90 following a long illness.

Eastern Orthodox Church titles
Preceded by Theodosius (Lazor)	Primate of the Orthodox Church in America; 22 July 2002 – 4 September 2008	Succeeded by Jonah (Paffhausen)
