= Theophilus Pashkovsky =

Russian-American Orthodox bishop (1874–1950)

His Beatitude Theophilus
- Archbishop of San Francisco, Metropolitan of All America and Canada
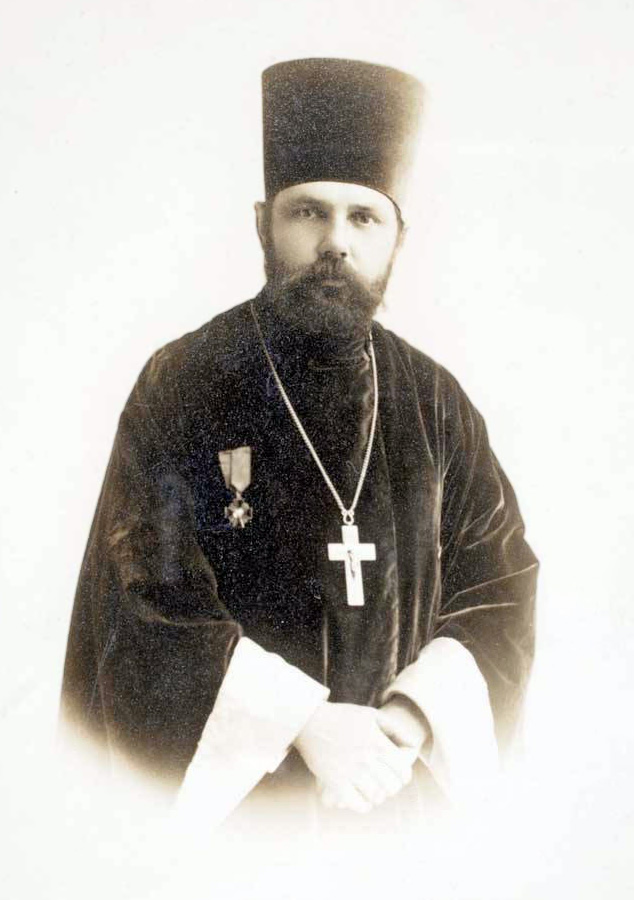
- Predecessor: Metropolitan Platon (Rozhdestvensky)
- Successor: Metropolitan Leontius (Turkevich)
- Other post: Archbishop of Chicago

Orders
- Ordination: December 4, 1897
- Consecration: December 3, 1922 (Consecrated); November 20, 1934 (elected Metropolitan)
- Rank: Metropolitan

Personal details
- Born: Feodor Nikolaevich Pashkovsky; 6 February 1874 Kiev, Kiev Governorate, Russian Empire
- Died: 27 June 1950 (aged 76) San Francisco, California, U.S.
- Denomination: Eastern Orthodox
- Children: Boris Pash
- Education: Kiev Theological Academy

Theophilus (Pashkovsky), born Feodor Nikolaevich Pashkovsky (Russian: Фёдор Николаевич Пашковский), and commonly known as Metropolitan Theophilus (February 6, 1874, in Kiev, Russian Empire – June 27, 1950, in San Francisco, United States), was the Orthodox primate of the North American metropolia, Archbishop of San Francisco and Metropolitan of All America and Canada.

== Life ==
Theodore Pashkovsky was born in the province of Kiev on February 6, 1874, into a priestly family. He attended the Kiev Theological Academy Preparatory School where he was noted as a disciplined and hard working student. The curing of a bone infection he developed while still a young student was to guide him in his future career. After doctors believed that the infection was not curable, prayers for Theodore by the already famous priest John of Kronstadt, when he visited the school, resulted in a complete healing. In gratitude, Theodore vowed to become a novice at the Kiev Lavra. This he fulfilled in 1894.

When Bishop Nicholas (Ziorov) of the North American diocese visited the Lavra to recruit workers for his mission, Theodore was invited to America. He was assigned as the secretary of the mission administration after arriving in San Francisco in late 1894. Soon after he met and married Ella Dabovich from the Serbian community. She was the niece of Fr. Sebastian Dabovich.

On December 4, 1897, he was ordained a priest following his earlier ordination as deacon. On June 20, 1900, his wife delivered him a son, Boris, who would be remembered during World War II as Colonel Boris Pash, the leader of the Alsos Mission in Europe under the Manhattan Project and as the Foreign Liaison Officer under General Douglas MacArthur during negotiations on the future of the Japanese Orthodox Church in 1945–1947.

When Archbishop Tikhon (Bellavin) returned to Russia in 1906, Fr. Theodore accompanied him with his family and worked in the administration of the Warsaw-Vilna Diocese.

During World War I, Fr. Theodore worked in the Famine Relief Program of the YMCA on the Volga River. In 1917 his wife died.

As the chaos of the Bolshevik regime settled over the Church, he met often with and was advised and instructed by Patriarch Tikhon on the future of the North American diocese. During these meetings Patriarch Tikhon also expressed the desire that Fr. Theodore become a bishop. Fr. Theodore returned to the United States in 1922 and was soon tonsured a monk with the name of Theophilus. Then, under direction of the Holy Synod Hieromonk Theophilus was consecrated on December 3, 1922, as Bishop of Chicago.

He oversaw the restart of theological education in the diocese that had ended with the closing, in 1924, of the seminary at Tenafly, New Jersey.

Bp. Theophilus remained in Chicago until he was transferred in 1931, to become Bishop of San Francisco.

After death of Metropolitan Platon (Rozhdestvensky) in 1934, Bishop Theophilus was elected jointly by the council of assembled bishops and the full Council as the new metropolitan by the Fifth All-American Sobor that convened in Cleveland, Ohio, on November 20, 1934.

Under Metr. Theophilus American Church continued to journey into a state of stability. Episcopal relationships improved as the threat of the Living Church subsided, although new challenges arose.

He took a course to unity of Russian Church diaspora: in 1935, he signed the "Provisional Regulations on the Russian Orthodox Church Abroad" (Russian: Временное Положение о Русской Православной Церкви заграницей), which led the Northern-American Metropolia came under the authority of the Synod of Bishops in Sremski Karlovci, but for all that metropolia, headed by Metropolitan Theophilus retained considerable autonomy.

Attention was given to improving church education programs, including establishing Saint Vladimir's Orthodox Theological Seminary. A metropolitan cathedral, the Holy Virgin Protection Cathedral, in New York City, was acquired.

However, the unity with the Russian Orthodox Church was fragile. On 26–29 November 1946, Cleveland Council adopted a resolution to quit over the Synod of Russian Orthodox Church Abroad. In the words of Archbishop Vitaly (Maksimenko), Metropolitan Theophilus did not sympathize the decision to sever ties with the Russian Orthodox Church Abroad, but did submit to the decision of the Council.

A residue of the chaos and episcopal problems of the 1920s remained through World War II and Metr. Theophilus' death on June 27, 1950.

== Sources ==
- Архіепископъ Виталій (Максименко). Памяти Митрополита Ѳеофила // Мотивы моей жизни. — Джорданвилль: Свято-Троицкий Монастырь, 1955. — С. 118—123
- Constance J. Tarasar, Orthodox America 1794–1976 Development of the Orthodox Church in America Syosett, New York, The Orthodox Church in America, 1975
- Vuković, Sava (1998). History of the Serbian Orthodox Church in America and Canada 1891–1941. Kragujevac: Kalenić.
- ПАШКОВСКИЙ Федор Николаевич // Русские в Северной Америке. Е. А. Александров. Хэмден (США)-Сан-Франциско (США)-Санкт-Петербург (Россия), 2005

Eastern Orthodox Church titles
Preceded by Platon (Rozhdestvensky)	Primate of the Orthodox Church in America; November 20, 1934 – February 6, 1950	Succeeded by Leontius (Turkevich)
