= Popular Patristics Series =

Christian book series

- Edited by: Bogdan Bucur
- Country: United States
- Language: English
- Discipline: Early Christianity and Eastern Christianity
- Publisher: St. Vladimir's Seminary Press
- No. of books: 68
- Website: Popular Patristics Series

The Popular Patristics Series (abbreviated PPS) is a series of volumes of original English translations of mainly first millennium Christian texts published by St. Vladimir's Seminary Press.

== Overview ==
The aim of the series is "to provide readable and accurate translations of a broad range of early Christian literature to a wide audience—from students of Christian history and theology to lay Christians reading for spiritual benefit." It currently comprises 68 volumes (though three are from related new series of Popular Patristics Series Longer Works).

The texts are principally translated from Greek, but some Latin, Syriac and Coptic writers are included. Each volume is translated by a recognized patristic scholar and also contains a concise but comprehensive introduction to the patristic author and their works.

John Behr was the longtime series editor until 2020, when he handed off the role to Bogdan Bucur.

== List of volumes ==
| No. | Title | Author | Translator | Notes |
|---|---|---|---|---|
| 1 | On the Priesthood | St. John Chrysostom | Graham Neville | |
| 2 | Lectures on the Christian Sacraments | St. Cyril of Jerusalem | Maxwell E. Johnson | discontinued |
| 2 (New) | Sermons from the Life of St. John Chrysostom | St. John Chrysostom | David C. Ford | |
| 3 | On the Divine Images | St. John of Damascus | David Anderson | discontinued |
| 3 (New) | Sermons on the Life of Christ | St. John Chrysostom | Robert G. T. Edwards | |
| 4 | On the Incarnation | St. Athanasius | Penelope Lawson | discontinued |
| 4 (New) | Behold the Thief with the Eyes of Faith: Greek and Latin Sermons on the Good Thief | Various | Mark G. Bilby | |
| 5 | On the Holy Spirit | St. Basil the Great | David Anderson | discontinued |
| 5 (New) | Verse Homilies on Cain and Abel | St. Jacob of Serugh | | |
| 6 | On the Holy Icons | St. Theodore the Studite | Catharine P. Roth | |
| 7 | On Marriage and Family Life | St. John Chrysostom | Catharine P. Roth & David Anderson | |
| 8 | On the Divine Liturgy | St. Germanus of Constantinople | Paul Meyendorff | |
| 9 | On Wealth and Poverty | St. John Chrysostom | Catharine P. Roth | 2nd edition published 2020 |
| 10 | Hymns on Paradise | St. Ephrem the Syrian | Sebastian Brock | |
| 11 | On Ascetical Life | St. Isaac of Nineveh | Mary T. Hansbury | |
| 12 | On the Soul and Resurrection | St. Gregory of Nyssa | Catharine P. Roth | |
| 13 | On the Unity of Christ | St. Cyril of Alexandria | John Anthony McGuckin | |
| 14 | On the Mystical Life: The Ethical Discourses, vol. 1: The Church and The Last Things | St. Symeon the New Theologian | Alexander Golitzin | |
| 15 | On the Mystical Life: The Ethical Discourses, vol. 2: On Virtue and Christian Life | St. Symeon the New Theologian | Alexander Golitzin | |
| 16 | On the Mystical Life: The Ethical Discourses, vol. 3: Life, Times, and Theology | St. Symeon the New Theologian | Alexander Golitzin | |
| 17 | On the Apostolic Preaching | St. Irenaeus of Lyons | John Behr | |
| 18 | On the Dormition of Mary: Early Patristic Homilies | | Brian E. Daley, S.J. | |
| 19 | On the Mother of God | St. Jacob of Serug | Mary T. Hansbury | |
| 20 | On Pascha | St. Melito of Sardis | Alistair Stewart-Sykes | discontinued |
| 20 (New) | Christological Letters | St. Maximus the Confessor | | |
| 21 | On God and Man: The Theological Poetry of St. Gregory of Nazianzus | St. Gregory of Nazianzus | Peter Gilbert | |
| 22 | On the Apostolic Tradition | St. Hippolytus | Alistair Stewart | discontinued |
| 22 (New) | Four Hundred Chapters on Love | St. Maximus the Confessor | | |
| 23 | On God and Christ, The Five Theological Orations and Two Letters to Cledonius | St. Gregory of Nazianzus | Frederick Williams & Lionel Wickham | |
| 24 | Three Treatises on the Divine Images | St. John of Damascus | Andrew Louth | new translation, replaces volume 3 |
| 25 | On the Cosmic Mystery of Jesus Christ | St. Maximus the Confessor | Robert L. Wilken & Paul M. Blowers | |
| 26 | Letters from the Desert | St. Barsanuphius and John | John Chryssavgis | |
| 27 | Four Desert Fathers – Pambo, Evagrius, Macarius of Egypt, and Macarius of Alexandria | | Tim Vivian | |
| 28 | Saint Macarius the Spiritbearer: Coptic Texts Relating to Saint Macarius the Great | | Tim Vivian | |
| 29 | On the Lord’s Prayer | Tertullian, St. Cyprian, & Origen | Allistair Stewart-Sykes | |
| 30 | On the Human Condition | St. Basil the Great | Nonna Verna Harrison | |
| 31 | The Cult of the Saints | St. John Chrysostom | Wendy Mayer & Bronwen Neil | |
| 32 | On the Church: Select Treatises | St. Cyprian of Carthage | Allen Brent | |
| 33 | On the Church: Select Letters | St. Cyprian of Carthage | Allen Brent | |
| 34 | The Book of Pastoral Rule | St. Gregory the Great | George E. Demacopoulos | |
| 35 | Wider Than Heaven: Eighth-century Homilies on the Mother of God | | Mary B. Cunningham | |
| 36 | Festal Orations | St. Gregory of Nazianzus | Nonna Verna Harrison | |
| 37 | Counsels on the Spiritual Life, Volumes One and Two | St. Mark the Monk | Tim Vivian & Augustine Casiday | |
| 38 | On Social Justice | St. Basil the Great | C. Paul Shroeder | |
| 39 | Harp of Glory (Enzira Sebhat): An Alphabetical Hymn of Praise for the Ever-Blessed Virgin Mary from the Ethiopian Orthodox Church | | John Anthony McGuckin | |
| 40 | Divine Eros: Hymns of Saint Symeon the New Theologian | St. Symeon the New Theologian | Daniel K. Griggs | |
| 41 | On the Two Ways: Life or Death, Light or Darkness: Foundational Texts in the Tradition | | Alistair Stewart | |
| 42 | On the Holy Spirit | St. Basil the Great | Stephen Hildebrand | new translation, replaces volume 5 |
| 43 | Works on the Spirit | St. Athanasius the Great and Didymus the Blind | Mark DelCogliano, Andrew Radde-Gallwitz & Lewis Ayres | |
| 44 | On the Incarnation | St. Athanasius the Great | John Behr | new translation, replaces volume 4; available in Greek and English (44A) or English only (44B) |
| 45 | Treasure-house of Mysteries: Exploration of the Sacred Text Through Poetry in the Syriac Tradition | | Sebastian Brock | |
| 46 | Poems on Scripture | St. Gregory of Nazianzus | Brian Dunkle, S.J. | |
| 47 | On Christian Doctrine and Practice | St. Basil the Great | Mark DelCogliano | |
| 48 | Light on the Mountain: Greek Patristic and Byzantine Homilies on the Transfiguration of the Lord | | Brian E. Daley, S.J. | |
| 49 | The Letters | St. Ignatius of Antioch | Alistair Stewart | |
| 50 | On Fasting and Feasts | St. Basil the Great | Susan R. Holman & Mark Delcogliano | |
| 51 | On Christian Ethics | St. Basil the Great | Jacob N. Van Sickle | |
| 52 | Give Me a Word: The Alphabetical Sayings of the Desert Fathers | | John Wortley | |
| 53 | Two Hundred Chapters On Theology | St. Maximus the Confessor | Luis Joshua Salés | |
| 54 | On the Apostolic Tradition | St. Hippolytus | Alistair Stewart | 2nd edition; replaces volume 22 |
| 55 | On Pascha | St. Melito of Sardis | Alistair Stewart | 2nd edition; replaces volume 20 |
| 56 | Letters to Saint Olympia | St. John Chrysostom | David C. Ford | |
| 57 | Lectures on the Christian Sacraments | St. Cyril of Jerusalem | Maxwell E. Johnson | 2nd edition; replaces volume 2 |
| 58 | The Testament of the Lord: Worship and Discipline in the Early Church | | Alistair Stewart | |
| 59 | On the Ecclesiastical Mystagogy: A Theological Vision of the Liturgy | St. Maximus the Confessor | Jonathan J. Armstrong | |
| 60 | Catechetical Discourse: A Handbook for Catechists | St. Gregory of Nyssa | Ignatius Green | |
| 61 | Hymns of Repentance | St. Romanos the Melodist | Andrew Mellas | |
| 62 | On the Orthodox Faith: Volume 3 of the Fount of Knowledge | St. John of Damascus | Norman Russell | |
| 63 | Headings on Spiritual Knowledge: The Second Part, Chapters 1-3 | St. Isaac of Nineveh | Sebastian Brock | |
| 64 | On Death and Eternal Life | St. Gregory of Nyssa | Brian E. Daley | |
| 65 | The Prayers of Saint Sarapion: The Bishop of Thmuis | St. Serapion of Thmuis | Maxwell E. Johnson | |

== List of Popular Patristics Series: Longer Works (PPS LW) volumes ==
| No. | Title | Author | Translator | Notes |
|---|---|---|---|---|
| 1 | The Triads | St. Gregory Palamas | Alexander R. Titus | |
| 2 | Hymns of Divine Eros | St. Symeon the New Theologian | John Anthony McGuckin | |
| 3 | Fount of Knowledge | St. John of Damascus | Norman Russell | |

== See also ==
- Cistercian Studies
