= Brian E. Daley =

American Catholic priest

Brian E. Daley, S.J.
- Born: January 18, 1940 (age 86); Orange, New Jersey, United States
- Education: Fordham University; Merton College, Oxford
- Occupations: Priest, Professor
- Employer: University of Notre Dame
- Known for: Theology, Patristics
- Awards: Ratzinger Prize for Theology (2012)

Brian Edward Daley, SJ (born in 1940) is an American Catholic priest, Jesuit, and theologian. He is currently the Catherine F. Huisking Professor of Theology (Emeritus) at the University of Notre Dame and was the recipient of a Ratzinger Prize for Theology in 2012.

Daley's primary academic field is ancient Christianity, specifically Patristics, otherwise known as the study of the Fathers of the Church. The Patristic topics on which he has published include Christology, eschatology, Mariology, philanthropy, and scriptural exegesis. Daley is best understood as continuing the work of the great twentieth century Jesuits of the Nouvelle Théologie such as Henri Crouzel, Jean Daniélou, Henri de Lubac, and Aloys Grillmeier.

In addition to his academic commitments, Daley is a popular speaker, is active in ecumenical dialogue, and serves as the executive secretary of the North American Orthodox-Catholic Theological Consultation.

== Biography ==
=== Background and education ===
Daley was born in 1940 in Orange, New Jersey, United States. He attended the Jesuit St. Peter's Preparatory School and did his first undergraduate degree at Fordham University, where he received a B.A. in cursu honorum in Classics in 1961. Daley was the first Fordham alumnus to receive a Rhodes Scholarship, which he used to read Literae Humaniores (also known as "Greats") at Merton College, Oxford. While there, he was tutored by the philosopher J. R. Lucas. He obtained a B.A. at Oxford in 1964 and entered the Society of Jesus the same year.

After receiving a licentiate in philosophy (Ph.L.) at Loyola Seminary in Shrub Oak, New York in 1966, Daley pursued theological studies in at the Sankt Georgen Graduate School of Philosophy and Theology in Frankfurt, Germany, where he worked as a research assistant to Aloys Grillmeier, a Jesuit priest who would go on to be named a Cardinal by Pope John Paul II in 1994.

Daley was ordained a priest on 25 July 1970 and completed a licentiate in theology (Lic. theol.) in 1972. From 1972 to 1978, Daley pursued a D.Phil. at Campion Hall, Oxford under the supervision of Henry Chadwick. He defended his thesis, entitled "Leontius of Byzantium: A Critical Edition of his Works, with Prolegomena," in 1978. His examiners were Kallistos Ware and Lionel Wickham.

=== Professional and ecumenical work ===
From 1978 to 1996, Daley taught at the Weston School of Theology and was one of the founders of the Boston Area Patristics Group. In 1996, he accepted a position at the University of Notre Dame, where he is currently the Catherine F. Huisking Professor of Theology. He was president of the North American Patristics Society from 1997 to 1998. He has been on the editorial board of several scholarly journals and has served as a trustee of Boston College, Fordham University, Georgetown University, and Le Moyne College.

Daley has long been committed to ecumenical dialogue and was one of the signatories of the 2003 "Princeton Proposal for Christian Unity," which was sponsored by the Center for Catholic and Evangelical Theology. He is also the current executive co-secretary for the North American Orthodox-Catholic Theological Consultation.

In October 2014, Daley presented "The Eastern Catholic Churches - A Roman Catholic Perspective Fifty Years after Orientalium ecclesiarum" at the conference "The Vatican II Decree on the Eastern Catholic Churches, Orientalium ecclesiarum - Fifty Years Later" organized by the Metropolitan Andrey Sheptytsky Institute of Eastern Christian Studies held at the University of Toronto.

=== Honors and awards ===
A Festschrift was published in Daley's honor in 2008. Notable contributors include Lewis Ayres, John Anthony McGuckin, and Rowan Williams.

Daley received the Ratzinger Prize for Theology on October 20, 2012. At the conferral ceremony, Pope Benedict XVI praised Daley for his ecumenical work with the following words: "Father Daley, through his in-depth study of the Fathers of the Church, has placed himself in the best school for knowing and loving the one and undivided Church, also in the wealth of her different traditions; for this reason, he also performs a responsible service in our relations with the Orthodox Churches." The other recipient of the Ratzinger Prize in 2012 was the French philosopher Rémi Brague.

In 2013, Daley was awarded the Johannes Quasten Medal by the School of Theology and Religious Studies of the Catholic University of America.

== Selected works ==
=== Books authored or co-authored ===
- Christology in Early Christianity: Collected Essays, ed. Andrew Hofer (Grand Rapids, MI: Eerdmans, 2025).
- Biblical Interpretation and Doctrine in Early Christianity: Collected Essays, ed. Andrew Hofer (Grand Rapids, MI: Eerdmans, 2025).
- God Visible: Patristic Christology Reconsidered (Oxford: Oxford University Press, 2018).
- The Harp of Prophecy: Early Christian Interpretation of the Psalms, edited with Paul R. Kolbet (Notre Dame, Indiana: University of Notre Dame Press, 2015).
- The Hope of the Early Church: A Handbook of Patristic Eschatology (Cambridge: Cambridge University Press, 1991; repr., Peabody: Hendrickson, 2003).
- Companions in the Mission of Jesus: Texts for Prayer and Reflection in the Lenten and Easter Seasons (New York: Georgetown University Press for the New York Province of the Society of Jesus, 1987).
- Eschatologie in der Schrift und Patristik, Handbuch der Dogmengeschichte IV.7a (Freiburg: Herder, 1986).
- Soteriologie in der Schrift und Patristik, Handbuch der Dogmengeschichte III.2a (Freiburg: Herder, 1978).

=== Books translated ===
- On Death and Eternal Life: St. Gregory of Nyssa (Crestwood, N.Y.: St. Vladimir's Seminary Press, 2022).
- Leontius of Byzantium: Complete Works, Oxford Early Christian Texts (Oxford: Oxford University Press, 2017).
- Light on the Mountain: Greek Patristic and Byzantine Homilies on the Transfiguration of the Lord (Crestwood, N.Y.: St. Vladimir's Seminary Press, 2013).
- Gregory of Nazianzus (London: Routledge, 2006).
- Cosmic Liturgy: The Universe According to Maximus the Confessor, by Hans Urs von Balthasar (San Francisco: Ignatius Press, 2003).
- On the Dormition of Mary: Early Patristic Homilies (Crestwood, N.Y.: St. Vladimir's Seminary Press, 1998).

=== Journal articles and chapters in books ===
- "The Divinization of the Theotokos: Fifth-Century Christological Controversy and the Figure of Mary," in Kevin M. Clarke and Don W. Springer (eds.), Patristic Spirituality: Classical Perspectives on Ascent in the Journey to God, (Leiden: Brill, 2022), 309–339.
- "Contemplating the Monad Who Saves Us: Maximus the Confessor and John of Damascus on Divine Simplicity," Modern Theology 35 (2019): 467–80.
- "From Exemplum to Sacramentum: Augustine’s Eschatological Hermeneutic of Salvation," Journal of Religion and Society, Supplement 15 (2018): 197–211.
- "Evagrius and Cappadocian Orthodoxy," in J. Kalvesmaki and R. Darling Young (eds.), Evagrius and His Legacy (Notre Dame, IN: University of Notre Dame Press, 2016), 14–48.
- "Logos as Reason and Logos Incarnate: Philosophy, Theology, and the Voices of Tradition," in Matthew L. Lamb (ed.), Theology Needs Philosophy (Washington: Catholic University of America, 2016), 91–115.
- "Unpacking the Chalcedonian Formula: From Studied Ambiguity to Saving Mystery," The Thomist 80 (2016): 165–189.
- "Antioch and Alexandria: Christology as Reflection on God's Presence in History," in Francesca Aran Murphy (ed.), The Oxford Handbook of Christology (Oxford: Oxford University Press, 2015), 121–138.
- "Knowing God in History and in the Church: Dei Verbum and 'Nouvelle Théologie,'" in G. Flynn and P. Murray (eds.), Ressourcement: A Movement for Renewal in Twentieth-Century Catholic Theology (Oxford: Oxford University Press, 2014), 333–54.
- "Dialogue, Communion and Unity," in Kristin M. Colberg and Robert A. Krieg (eds.), The Theology of Cardinal Walter Kasper (Collegeville: Liturgical Press, 2014), 139–153.
- "Maximus the Confessor and John of Damascus on the Trinity," in Khaled Anatolios (ed.), The Holy Trinity in the Life of the Church (Grand Rapids, MI: Baker Academic, 2014), 79–99.
- "Breathing with Both Lungs: Fifty Years of the Dialogue of Love," in John Chryssavgis (ed.), Dialogue of Love: Breaking the Silence of Centuries (New York: Fordham University Press, 2014), 27–54.
- "Maximus Confessor, Leontius of Byzantium, and the Late Aristotelian Metaphysics of the Person," in Knowing the Purpose of Creation through the Resurrection: Proceedings of the Symposium on St. Maximus the Confessor, Belgrade, October 18–21, 2012, edited by Bishop Maxim (Vasilijevic)(Alhambra, CA: Sebastian Press, 2013), 55–70.
- "Systematic Theology in Homeric Dress: Gregory Nazianzen’s Poemata Arcana," in Christopher Beeley (ed.), Rereading Gregory of Nazianzus [Festschrift for Frederick Norris], (Washington: Catholic University of America Press, 2012), 3–12.
- "'In Many and Various Ways': Towards a Theology of Theological Exegesis," Modern Theology 28 (2012): 597–615.
- "Woman of Many Names: Mary in Orthodox and Catholic Theology," Theological Studies 71 (2010): 846–69.
- "The Law, the Whole Christ, and the Spirit of Love: Grace as a Trinitarian Gift in Augustine’s Theology," Augustinian Studies 41 (2010): 123–44.
- "What We Can Learn from Patristic Exegesis", in Patricia Walters (ed.), From Judaism to Christianity: Tradition and Transition, (Leiden: Brill, 2010), 267–88.
- "Christ and Christology," in David G. Hunter and Susan Ashbrook Harvey (eds.), Oxford Handbook of Early Christianity, (Oxford University Press, 2008), 886–905.
- "Making a Human Will Divine: Augustine and Maximus on Christ and Human Salvation," in Orthodox Readings of Augustine, edited by G. Demacopoulos and A. Papanikolaou (Crestwood, N.Y.: St. Vladimir's Seminary Press, 2008), 101–26.
- "The Word and His Flesh: Human Weakness and the Identity of Jesus in Patristic Christology," in Seeking the Identity of Jesus: A Pilgrimage, edited by B. Gaventa and R. Hays (Grand Rapids: Eerdmans, 2008), 251–69.
- "'One Thing and Another': The Persons in God and the Person of Christ in Patristic Theology," Pro Ecclesia 15 (2006): 17–46.
- "Incorporeality and ‘Divine Sensibility’: The Importance of De Principiis 4.4 for Origen's Theology,” Studia Patristica 41 (2006): 139-44.
- "Word, Soul and Flesh: Origen and Augustine on the Person of Christ," Augustinian Studies 36 (2005) 299–326.
- "The Nouvelle Théologie and the Patristic Revival: Sources, Symbols, and the Science of Theology," International Journal of Systematic Theology 7, no. 4 (2005): 362–82.
- "‘He Himself is our Peace' (Eph 2.14): Early Christian Views of Redemption in Christ,” in The Redemption: An Interdisciplinary Symposium, edited by Gerald O’Collins, S.J., Stephen Davis, and Daniel Kendall, S.J. (Oxford: Oxford University Press, 2004), 149–76.
- "Balthasar's Reading of the Church Fathers," in The Cambridge Companion to Hans Urs von Balthasar, eds. E. Oakes and D. Moss (Cambridge: Cambridge University Press, 2004), 187–206.
- "Universal Love and Local Structure: Augustine, the Papacy, and the Church in Africa," The Jurist 64 (2004): 39–63.
- "Rebuilding the Structure of Love: the Quest for Visible Unity among the Churches,” in The Ecumenical Future. Background Papers for: In One Body through the Cross: The Princeton Proposal for Christian Unity, edited by Carl E. Braaten and Robert W. Jenson (Grand Rapids: Eerdmans, 2004), 73–105.
- "Saint Gregory of Nazianzus as Pastor and Theologian," in Loving God with our Minds: The Pastor as Theologian, edited by Michael Welker and Cynthia Jarvis (Grand Rapids, MI: Eerdmans, 2004), 106–119.
- "The Fullness of the Saving God: Cyril of Alexandria on the Holy Spirit," in The Theology of St. Cyril of Alexandria, edited by Thomas G. Weinandy and Daniel A. Keating (London: T&T Clark, 2003), 113–48.
- "Is Patristic Exegesis Still Usable? Reflections on Early Christian Interpretation of the Psalms,” Communio 29 (2002) 181–216; shorter version in The Art of Reading Scripture, edited by Ellen F. Davis and Richard B.Hays (Eerdmans, 2003), 69–88.
- "Nature and the 'Mode of Union': Late Patristic Models for the Personal Unity of Christ," in The Incarnation: An Interdisciplinary Symposium, edited by G. O'Collins, S. Davis, and D. Kendall (Oxford: Oxford University, 2002), 164–96.
- "'Heavenly Man' and 'Eternal Christ': Apollinarius and Gregory of Nyssa on the Personal Identity of the Savior," Journal of Early Christian Studies 10, no. 4 (2002): 469–488.
- "'A Hope for Worms.' Early Christian Hope,” in Resurrection: Theological and Scientific Assessments, edited by Ted Peters, Robert John Russell and Michael Welker (Eerdmans: Grand Rapids, 2002), 136–64.
- "'At the Hour of Our Death': Mary's Dormition and Christian Dying in Late Patristic and Early Byzantine Literature," Dumbarton Oaks Papers 55 (2001): 71–89.
- "Revisiting the 'Filioque': Part One, Roots and Branches of an Old Debate," Pro Ecclesia 10, no. 1 (2001): 31–62.
- "Revisiting the 'Filioque': Part Two, Contemporary Catholic Approaches," Pro Ecclesia 10, no. 2 (2001): 195–212.
- "Training for the ‘Good Ascent’: Gregory of Nyssa on Psalm 6," in In Dominico Eloquio/In Lordly Eloquence: Essays on Patristic Exegesis in Honor of Robert Wilken, edited by P. Blowers, A.Christman, D. Hunter and R. D. Young (Grand Rapids: Eerdmans, 2001), 211–17.
- "Building the New City: The Cappadocian Fathers and the Rhetoric of Philanthropy," Journal of Early Christian Studies 7, no. 3 (1999): 431–61.
- "Origen's De Principiis: A Guide to the 'Principles' of Christian Scriptural Interpretation," in Nova et Vetera: Patristic Studies in Honor of Thomas Patrick Halton, edited by John Petruccione (Catholic University of America Press, 1998), 3-21.
- "Apocalypticism in Early Christian Theology," in Encyclopedia of Apocalypticism II, edited by Bernard McGinn, (Continuum: New York, 1998), 3-47.
- "Christology," "Incarnation," "Resurrection," for St. Augustine through the Ages: An Encyclopedia, edited by A. Fitzgerald (Grand Rapids: Eerdmans, 1999).
- "'Bright Darkness' and Christian Transformation: Gregory of Nyssa on the Dynamics of Mystical Union," Studia Philonica Annual 8 (1996): 82–98.
- "What Did 'Origenism' Mean in the Sixth Century?" in Origeniana Sexta: Proceedings of Sixth International Conference on Origen Studies (Chantilly, France; August 30-September 3, 1993) (Leuven: Peeters, 1995), 627–38.
- "Position and Patronage in the Early Church: The Original Meaning of 'Primacy of Honour'," Journal of Theological Studies N.S. 44 (1993): 529–553.
- "'A Richer Union': Leontius of Byzantium and the Relationship of Human and Divine in Christ," Studia Patristica 24 (1993): 239–265
- "The Giant's Twin Substances: Ambrose and the Christology of Augustine's Contra sermonem Arianorum," in Augustine: Presbyter Factus Sum, ed. Joseph T. Lienhard, Earl C. Muller, Roland J. Teske (New York: Peter Lang, 1993), 477–95.
- "The Ripening of Salvation: Hope for Resurrection in the Early Church," Communio 17 (1990): 27–49.
- "A Humble Mediator: The Distinctive Elements in Saint Augustine’s Christology," Word and Spirit 9 (1987): 100–17.
- "Boethius' Theological Tracts and Early Byzantine Scholasticism," Mediaeval Studies 46 (1984): 158–91.
- "The Origenism of Leontius of Byzantium," Journal of Theological Studies NS 27 (1976): 333–69.
