= Pro-Nicene theology =

The characterization pro-Nicene points to one of the central tenets of the new approach to fourth-century Trinitarian theology advocated by Lewis Ayres and Michel René Barnes, among others. The designation pro-Nicene classifies and describes Trinitarian theological accounts of the mid- to late fourth century (ca. 360s to 380s) that supported the propositions in the Creed of Nicaea. Some scholars prefer to utilize a middle category, or stage in theological development, that provides further differentiation between Nicene theologies and pro-Nicene theologies: Barnes labels this middle category "neo-Nicene" theology. Nevertheless, all the scholars who utilize the pro-Nicene category stress the logical compatibility that exists within different theologies of the period, rather than one particular theology. The feature of these like-minded theological accounts that has garnered the most attention is the understanding that in sharing the one power of God, the Father and Son must share the same nature.

This new approach contrasts itself with narratives that describe the orthodox Trinitarian theologies of this period as utilizing different arguments of logic. For instance, this new approach would disagree with the contention that some orthodox accounts start from the affirmation of distinction within the Godhead and argue toward unity, while other orthodox accounts start from the affirmation of unity within the Godhead and argue toward distinction.
