= John Behr =

British priest and theologian (born 1966)

The Very Reverend John Behr
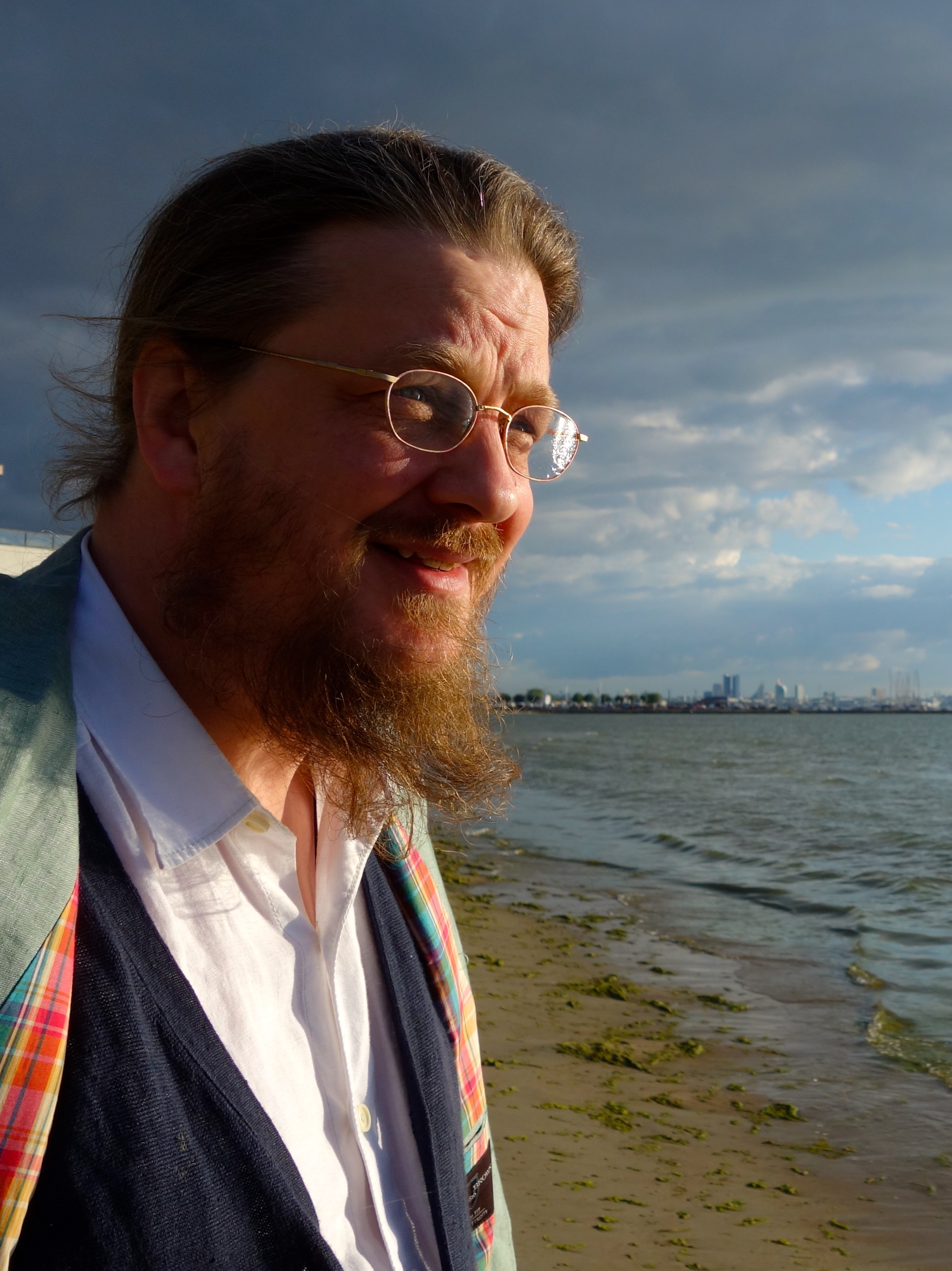
- Behr in 2015
- Born: 16 October 1966 (age 59); England

Academic background
- Education: Thames Polytechnic; University of Oxford
- Thesis: Godly lives: asceticism and anthropology, with special reference to sexuality, in the writings of St. Irenaeus of Lyons and St. Clement of Alexandria (1995)

Academic work
- Discipline: Theology
- Sub-discipline: Early Christianity; Byzantine studies
- Institutions: St. Vladimir's Orthodox Theological Seminary; University of Aberdeen

John Behr FBA (born 16 October 1966) is a British Eastern Orthodox priest and theologian. Since 2020, he has served as the Regius Professor of Humanity at the University of Aberdeen. He is the former dean of St. Vladimir's Orthodox Theological Seminary, where he was the director of the Master of Theology Program and the Father Georges Florovsky Distinguished Professor of Patristics. He was ordained to the diaconate on 8 September 2001 and the priesthood on 14 September 2001. He served as the editor of the Popular Patristics Series, published by St. Vladimir's Seminary Press, from 1999 until 2020. He was elected dean of the seminary on 18 November 2006 and served from 2007 until 2017 when he was named Father Georges Florovsky Distinguished Professor of Patristics.

== Biography ==
Behr completed his undergraduate studies at Thames Polytechnic, London, in 1987. His Bachelor of Arts dissertation was entitled "Of God, Man, and Creation: A Comparative Study of the Anthropology of the Greek Fathers and Emmanuel Levinas". Having studied under Bishop Kallistos Ware, Behr earned his Master of Philosophy degree in 1991 and Doctor of Philosophy degree in theology from Oxford University in 1995. Remnants of his master's thesis, "Sexuality, Marriage, and Asceticism in Second-Century Christian Writings", are found in his doctoral dissertation published in 2000 by Oxford University Press under the title Asceticism and Anthropology in Irenaeus and Clement. Behr completed a Master of Theology degree from St Vladimir's in 1997. His thesis, a complete textual criticism of On the Apostolic Preaching by Irenaeus of Lyons, was subsequently published by St. Vladimir's Seminary Press.

Behr has been Distinguished Lecturer at the Fordham University Theology Faculty, Visiting Professor of Historical Theology at the Nashotah House Theological Seminary, adjunct lecturer and faculty member of the St. Athanasius College of the University of Divinity which specialises in Coptic Orthodox theological studies. In September 2019, he was also appointed as professor in divinity at the Aberdeen University's School of Divinity, History and Philosophy.

He was elected a fellow of the British Academy in 2025.

Behr is married to a teacher of English and is the father of two sons and a daughter.

== Works ==
=== The Way to Nicaea ===
Behr's first major work, The Way to Nicaea, published in 2001, follows early Christian reflection beginning with the Scriptural Christ and continuing through to the Council of Antioch. This first of three volumes primarily consist of the examination of certain theologians: Ignatius, Justin Martyr, Irenaeus of Lyons, Hippolytus of Rome and the Roman Debates, Origen of Alexandria, and Paul of Samosata and the Council of Antioch. In his second volume, Behr provides a short biographical sketch of each, and then focuses on their works and the controversies they were engaged in. Neither a comprehensive history of theology nor a compendium of Christian doctrine, Behr instead draws attention to the theological debates and reflections that led up to the First Council of Nicaea.

Because the answer to a question can only be provided by its meaning, Behr begins with the question Christ himself asks, "Who do you say I am?" This answer, while provided by the Gospel, requires reflection—interpretation and explanation of this very person of Jesus Christ, his life and works. The writings of the New Testament, written from an interpretative confession of the crucified and risen Christ contemplated through Scripture, were the subject of intense debate and formation, eventually finding their normative foundation by the end of the 2nd century. According to Behr, this background is not only necessary for understanding later theological debates, but it is crucial to understanding those boundaries that identify Jesus Christ. It is the unique Jesus Christ-crucified on a cross, buried, risen three days later-contemplated through the texture of Scripture-the Law, the Psalms, and the Prophets-who is revealed as the Son of God. The incarnation, then, is not the single moment in which something began but rather a recapitulation—the same presence of the same word. It is through the Word of God previously hidden in the Scripture, as preached by the Apostles, revealed by the Holy Spirit, that the invisible, incomprehensible Father is made visible and comprehensible by the crucified and risen Jesus Christ. It is he who is always the Coming One, whom through continual contemplation and immersion in Scripture, devotion and death in his name, allows us to participate in the fullness of God.

=== The Nicene Faith ===
Released in 2004, The Nicene Faith examines the theological reflection of the 4th century, beginning with the church shaking debates that led to Council of Nicaea and ending with their resolution at the Council of Constantinople. Like its predecessor, The Nicene Faith is structured not only chronologically, but according theme, examining of only certain theologians-Athanasius, Basil of Caesarea, Gregory of Nazianzus, and Gregory of Nyssa. Adapting a similar approach to The Way to Nicaea, this volume is neither a complete collection of theological discourses nor does it have a sole focus, such as Trinitarian theology. Rather, The Nicene Faith traces the development of theological reflection in the 4th century—Athanasius and the Cappadocians expounding their vision, preparing the path for the councils of Nicaea and Constantinople, providing the proper context in which their creeds can be correctly understood. One simply cannot reduce the results of these debates into shorthand formulae.

Key to understanding Behr's approach, the introduction, standing outside of the main body of work, explains the need to scrutinise our inherently flawed perspectives and presuppositions regarding 4th century theology. An awareness of this 21st century understanding of such terms as "orthodoxy", "incarnation", and "Trinitarian" theology recognises that we speak these terms with 1,600 years of definitions already read into them, rather than how the authors themselves used these words within their own texts.

The Nicene Faith both discusses and reflects upon Athanasius and the Cappadocians’ exegetical principles and subsequently derived theology, specifically within the context of the controversies upon which this was forced. Thus, leading to a further, more carefully worded engagement with Scripture, once again seeking to answer the same question that led the way to Nicaea, Christ's "Who do you say that I am?"

Nicene faith is, then, a particular confession, revealing the power of God, responding to Christ and the Spirit, concerning the God whom they reveal as the Father. It is the transformation fashioned in and by Christ that propels all theological contemplation. It provides the lens through which one understands his Passion. When Christ dies as a human being, he demonstrates his divinity as God—he raises his own body. God's power is found in human weakness—the form of a servant transforms into the form of the Lord—revealing not inferiority but true divinity and equality. It is as the crucified one that glory is both received and revealed—the same glory which he shared with the Father from all eternity, by which there is no other. This revelation, the cornerstone of all Christian theology, through which God is made known, is located solely on the Cross. The one who was creator is the one who now renews. It is the Passion, the mystery of the Incarnation of the Word of God, illumined by and through the Cross, Christ's voluntary bodily death and resurrection, through which those who have put on his faith, now live in Christ and continue to demonstrate his victory.

=== The Mystery of Christ ===
The Mystery of Christ is a systematic presentation of theology that emerged from Behr's first two volumes, The Way to Nicaea and The Nicene Faith. A break from The Formation of Christian Theology series, the book provides a vision of Christian theology that challenges the reader to rethink the modern historical approach to theology—a discipline that has become ever more fragmented in its study.

Once again returning to the earlier witnesses, Behr begins with the way in which the disciples came to know Jesus Christ as the Son of God—through the Cross and the manner in which the Passion was interpreted and proclaimed. This revelation does not occur in light of the Passion, but when the risen Christ himself directs the disciples to the scriptures. The text of the Old Testament, previously viewed as a narrative of the past, is revealed as a thesaurus of imagery, with the historical event of the Passion as its starting point. It is Christ, not scripture, who is exegeted. The crucified and risen Lord standing before them is the one of whom the scriptures have always spoken—the one who is still the Coming One.

Given this perspective, Behr continues by explaining how the results of the theological debates of the first four centuries—particularly Trinitarian theology and Christology—have become separated from the way in which they were exegetically formed and articulated. Within this structure he considers questions of canon and tradition. How is it that we speak of creation and salvation today? How is the "Fall" (mis)understood? This is crucial, not only regarding the narrative of salvation history, but more importantly how we understand our own lives. Additionally, Behr examines how Mary is spoken of in the Gospels and liturgical texts—both the nativity and the Virgin Mother as the church. Finally, he focuses on theme of incarnation, which upon interpretation presents the body as that through which Christians are to glorify God.

In the carefully worded postscript, Behr provides further attention to modern theology's paradigmatic shift away from the exegetical methods from which early Christian doctrine was originally elaborated. Today's starting points are conclusions without arguments that have resulted in ambiguity. Much of our theology now works within a modern historical framework, recounting the interaction between God as Trinity and the world. With a Trinity as a starting point, the linear movement proceeds to retell the creation story, our time in Eden, and the Fall of Man as a historical moment in history. Thus begins salvation history, the second person of the Trinity—the pre-incarnate Logos—revealing himself to Abraham, conversing with Moses, and speaking through the Prophets. This culminates in the incarnation of one of the Trinity, who then returns to the Father, sends the Holy Spirit to guide the church for the rest of humankind until the second coming, which is the literal, definable end of the time-line. This popular modern trend which seeks the reality of history—how things really occurred as a neutral statement—ignores the recognition that history is an interpretation of past events. Instead of interpretation and confession, theology has become a fusion of metaphysics and mythology.

== Bibliography ==
- Gregory of Nyssa: On the Human Image of God, Oxford University Press, 2023 (ISBN 978-0-19-284397-5)
- John the Theologian and His Paschal Gospel: A Prologue to Theology, Oxford University Press, 2019 (ISBN 978-0-19-883753-4)
- Origen: On First Principles, ed. and trans. Oxford University Press, 2018 (ISBN 978-0-19-968402-1)
- The Cross Stands, While the World Turns: Homilies for the Cycles of the Year. SVS Press, 2014. (ISBN 978-0-88141-495-0)
- Becoming Human: Meditations on Christian Anthropology in Word and Image, SVS Press, 2013 (ISBN 978-0-88141-439-4)
- Irenaeus of Lyons: Identifying Christianity, Oxford University Press, 2013 (ISBN 978-0-19-921462-4)
- St Athanasius: On the Incarnation, trans. SVS Press, 2012 (ISBN 978-0-88141-409-7)
- The Case Against Diodore and Theodore, Oxford University Press, 2011 (ISBN 978-0-19-956987-8)
- The Mystery of Christ: Life in Death, SVS Press, 2006. (ISBN 0-88141-306-2)
- The Nicene Faith (Formation of Christian Theology, V.2), SVS Press, 2004. (ISBN 0-88141-267-8)
- The Way to Nicaea (The Formation of Christian Theology, V. 1), SVS Press, 2001. (ISBN 0-88141-224-4)
- Asceticism and Anthropology in Irenaeus and Clement, Oxford University Press, 2000 (ISBN 0-19-827000-3) (Behr's Oxford doctoral thesis.)
- On the Apostolic Preaching, trans. SVS Press, 1997 (ISBN 978-0-88141-174-4) (Behr's Master of Theology from St Vladimir's.)

Academic offices
Preceded by John H. Erickson	Dean of Saint Vladimir's Orthodox Theological Seminary; 2007-2017	Succeeded by Ionuț-Alexandru Tudorie
