= Saint Vladimir's Orthodox Theological Seminary =

Eastern Orthodox seminary in Yonkers, NY

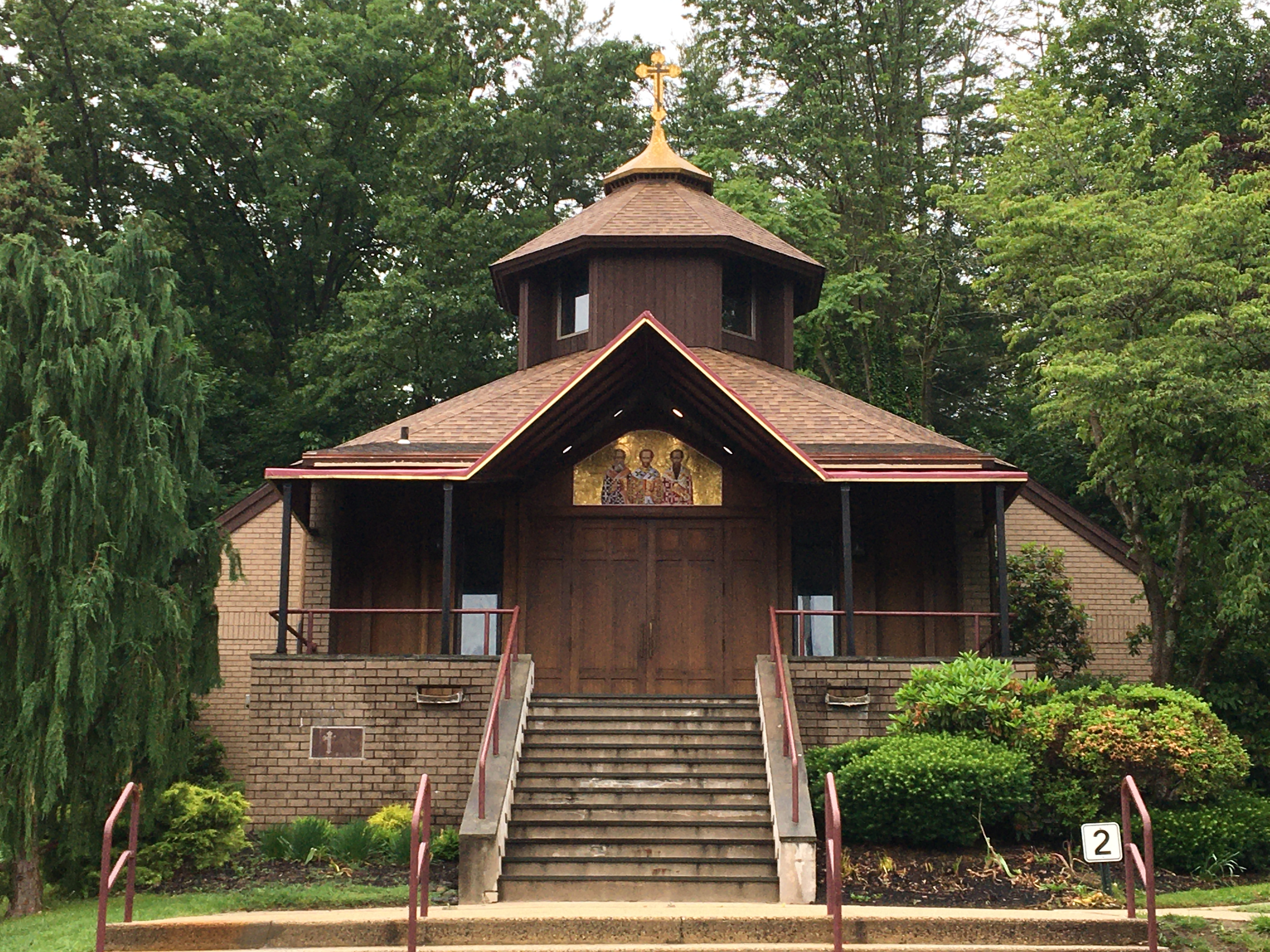
- Three Hierarchs Chapel at St. Vladimir's Seminary.
- Type: Seminary
- Established: 1938; 88 years ago
- Accreditation: Association of Theological Schools in the United States and Canada
- Religious affiliation: Eastern Orthodox Church (Primarily Orthodox Church in America)
- Dean: Ionuț-Alexandru Tudorie
- Academic staff: 8 full-time (fall 2024)
- Students: 93 (fall 2024)
- Location: Yonkers, New York, United States; 40°58′11″N 73°49′26″W
- Website: https://www.svots.edu/

St. Vladimir’s Orthodox Theological Seminary (SVOTS, also SVS) is an Eastern Orthodox seminary in Yonkers, New York. It is chartered under the State University of New York and accredited by the Association of Theological Schools. It is a Pan-Orthodox institution associated with the Orthodox Church in America (OCA) accepting students from many different Christian jurisdictions with the 2024-2025 SVOTS Impact Report stating its students come from 14 different jurisdictions: 10 Eastern Orthodox Jurisdictions, 3 Oriential Orthodox Jurisdictions, and 3 others.

It is named after St. Vladimir, Grand Prince of Kiev and Prince of Novgorod, who "introduced Orthodox Christianity to the Kievan Rus'".

== History ==
The seminary was founded in 1938 and its first classes were held in the parish house of the Church of Christ the Savior in Harlem. In 1939, it found a home on the campus of General Theological Seminary in Chelsea and by the 1940s in apartments on 121st Street rented from Union Theological Seminary.

It moved to its current location in 1962. Four years later, it was accepted as an associate member of the American Association of Theological Schools, with accreditation following in 1973.

In November 2021, the Board of Trustees of the seminary voted to relocate the campus citing the high cost of living in the New York metropolitan area, but by 2024 decided to pause further discussion of a move.

== Academics ==
=== Accreditation ===
St. Vladimir's Seminary is accredited by the Association of Theological Schools (ATS) and approved by ATS to grant the following degrees: Master of Divinity (MDiv), Master of Arts (MA), Master of Theology (ThM), and Doctor of Ministry (DMin), and Doctor of Philosophy (PhD).

=== Enrollment and faculty ===
As of fall 2024, 93 students are enrolled in the institution, which has 8 full-time faculty.

== St. Vladimir’s Seminary Press (SVS Press) ==
St. Vladimir's Seminary Press was founded in 1962 and is the largest publisher of Orthodox Christian books in the English language.

Among their titles is the Popular Patristics Series.

== Leadership ==
=== President/Chancellor ===
1. Chad Hatfield (2007–2024)
2. Ionuț-Alexandru Tudorie (2024–present; interim)

=== Deans ===
1. Macarius (Ilyinsky) (1938–1944)
2. Dionysius (Diachenko) (1944–1947)
3. John (Shahovskoy) (1947–1950)
4. Georges Florovsky (1950–1955)
5. Leontius (Turkevich) (1955–1962)
6. Alexander Schmemann (1962–1983)
7. John Meyendorff (1984–1992)
8. Thomas Hopko (1992–2002)
9. John H. Erickson (2002–2007)
10. John Behr (2007–2017)
11. Ionuț-Alexandru Tudorie (2018–present)
