= Chad Hatfield =

Eastern Orthodox priest and academic

Marvin Richard Chad Hatfield (born December 15, 1953) is an Eastern Orthodox archpriest and professor of missiology and evangelism. He was the president of St. Vladimir's Orthodox Seminary from 2007 to 2024. He is also the editor of the Orthodox Christian Profiles series, published by St. Vladimir’s Seminary Press.

== Biography ==
In the Episcopal Church, Hatfield was ordained to the priesthood in November, 1978 by Bishop William Frey of the Episcopal Diocese of Colorado. He was an associate of the Sisterhood of the Holy Nativity, a member of the Catholic Clerical Union, and a priest of the Confraternity of the Blessed Sacrament. He belonged to the Anglican Society of Mary and the Evangelical and Catholic Mission, a predecessor of the Episcopal Synod of America. He served as chaplain at the University of Denver from 1979 to 1981

In the Orthodox Church, Hatfield was ordained to the diaconate (January 5, 1994) and the priesthood (January 6, 1994) by Bishop Basil Essey of Wichita (Antiochian Orthodox Christian Archdiocese of North America). Between 2002 and 2007 he served as the dean of Saint Herman Theological Seminary in Alaska. On November 18, 2006, he was elected chancellor of St. Vladimir's Orthodox Seminary and began his term on September 8, 2007. Ten year later, he was appointed chief executive officer. A few months later, he was appointed president of the institute.

He is married to Matushka Thekla (Shelley Gray) since 1981. She is the coordinator for the St. Juliana Society. An iconographer and graphic designer, she is currently finishing her certification as a botanical illustrator. They have two sons and three grandchildren.

== Education ==
- 1975 - B.A., Southwestern College
- 1978 - M.Div., Nashotah House
- 1988 - S.T.M., Nashotah House. Thesis: "Baptism, Chrismation, Eucharist: Christian Initiation, A Recovery of the Primitive Pattern"
- 2001 - D.Min., Pittsburgh Theological Seminary. Thesis: "An Examination of the Pastoral Rites for Ministry to the Sick as Found in the Orthodox Christian Euchologia"
- 2015 - Certificate in Fund Raising Management from Indiana University School of Philanthropy, 2015

== Pastoral experience ==
- 1978-1993 – 16 years of ministry in the Episcopal Church as parish priest, school chaplain, missionary in South Africa and as cathedral dean
- 1994-2002 – Founding Pastor of All Saints Orthodox Church, Salina, Kansas
- 1999-2002 – Priest-in-charge, St. Mary Magdalene Orthodox Mission, Manhattan, Kansas

== Publications ==
Hatfield is editor of the Orthodox Christian Profiles and the Mission and Evangelism series, and author of several publications.

Selected publications include:

- From Masks to Icons – Center for Ethics and Religion, University of Notre Dame, 2004
- Seminarians and Substance Abuse Training – National Center on Addiction and Substance Abuse, Columbia University, 2005
- Models for American Orthodox Missiology, Orthodox Education Day, SVS, 2007
- Speaker at “Europe & the Judeo-Christian Tradition”, Vienna, Austria, 2010
- Bishop Grafton & St. Tikhon, Fellowship of St. Alban and St. Sergius Celebration of the 20th Anniversary of the Glorification of St. Tikhon, Nashotah House
- Speaker, National Religious Freedom Conference, Washington, D.C., 2012
- Anglican/Orthodox Dialogue, Annual Kuehner Lecture, Reformed Episcopal Seminary, Blue Bell, Pa, 2014
- Orthodoxy & The Seventh Ecumenical Council, Anglo-Catholic Congress, Fort Worth, TX, 2015
- Marriage & Theosis, World Congress of Families, Salt Lake City, UT, November 2015
- Legacy of St. Vladimir’s Seminary, 1000th Anniversary Celebration of the Repose of St. Vladimir, Moscow, Russia, 2015
- Lessons from Contemporary Orthodox Missiology, Romanian Youth Worker Symposium, Fordham University, 16 April 2016
- Marriage as a Pathway to Theosis, "Walk Through the Door of Holiness: An Ecumenical Conference Exploring Christian Character within Post-Christian Culture,” Greenwich, NY
