= Michel René Barnes =

American theologian

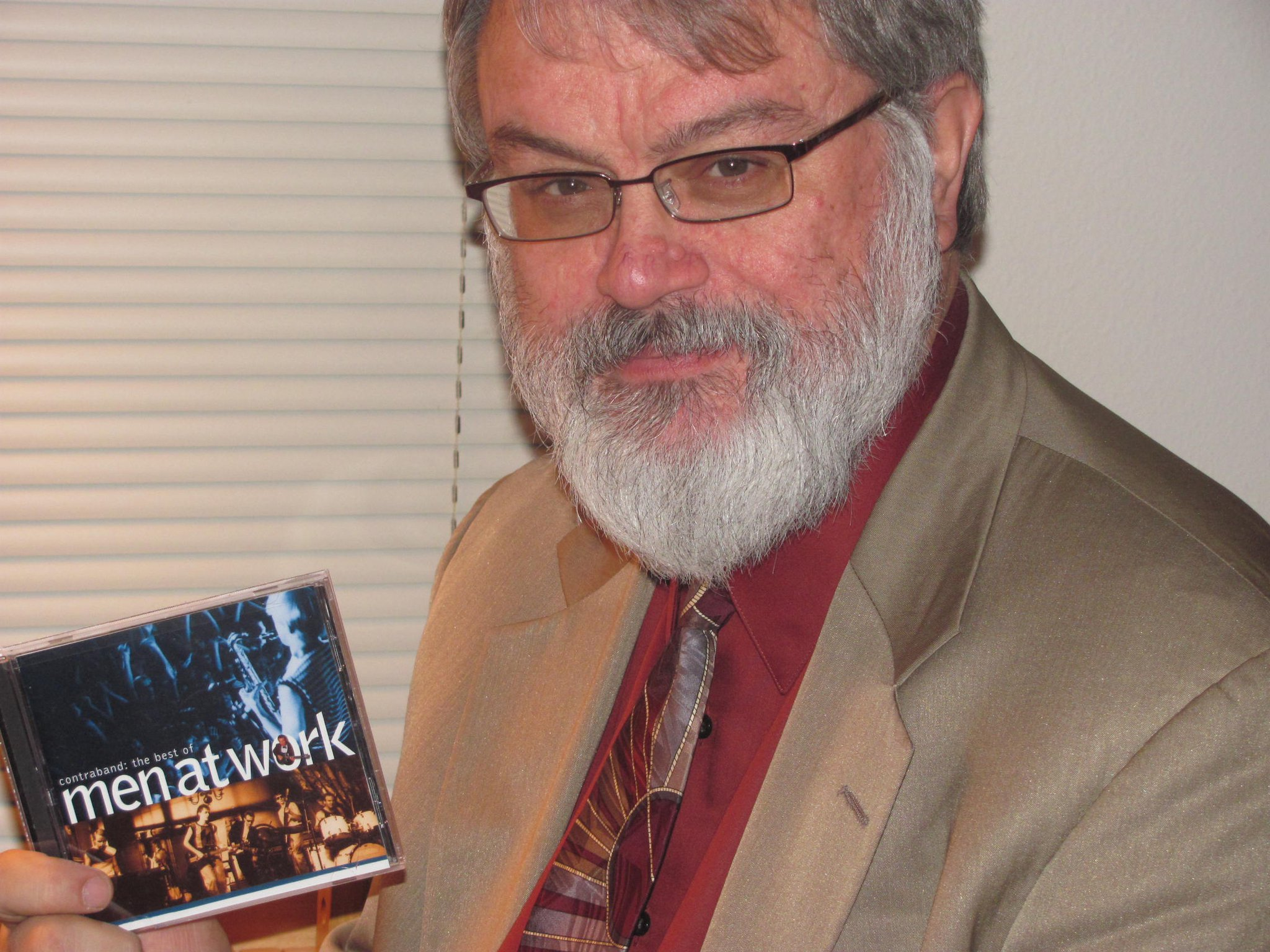
Michel Rene Ponchin Barnes Michel René Barnes

Michel René Barnes has been, since May 2018, Associate Professor emeritus of Historical Theology at Marquette University in Milwaukee, Wisconsin. He focuses on Latin and Greek Patristic Theology, in particular, Gregory of Nyssa, Augustine of Hippo, and pneumatological development in the early church. He now works as principal research fellow at the "Augustine Agency", a privately financed research library outside Milwaukee (and wholly unaffiliated with Marquette University).

== Biography ==
Barnes attended St. John's College, Santa Fe, New Mexico (1969–1973), and earned his Ph.D. under the direction of John Rist and Joanne McWilliam at the University of St. Michael's College, Toronto. He also holds an M.Div. and Th.M. St. Michael's. His doctorate is in Systematic Theology, with a major in development of doctrine and a minor in hermeneutics.

Barnes lives in Milwaukee with his wife, Julia, and one of his three daughters.

== Theological project ==
Barnes's research first focused on 4th-century Trinitarian theology on which he published several articles and the monograph, The Power of God: A Study of Gregory of Nyssa's Trinitarian Theology. He co-edited with Daniel H. Williams, a colleague and friend from St. Michael's, Arianism After Arius: Essays on the Development of Fourth Century Trinitarian Conflicts.

Barnes wrote a paper on the narrative that developed from nineteenth-century scholar Theodore DeRégnon's characterization of Eastern and Western Trinitarian theology as starting from distinction and unity, respectively. DeRégnon had said that Western Trinitarian theology had emphasized God's oneness, while Eastern Trinitarian theology had emphasized his threeness. In the Harvard Theological Review Khaled Anatolios acknowledged that “The assertion of a substantive rift between Eastern and Western trinitarian theologies ... is not found in either Hanson or Simonetti ... and its genealogy ... has been famously exposed by Michel Barnes.” Matthew Drever also noted the attempt by Barnes, Ayres, and others to argue that many of the traditional categories for analyzing pre- and post-Nicene thought were inadequate. This paper is probably Barnes's most influential publication to date.

Barnes proceeded, with Lewis Ayres in particular, to cast Pro-Nicene Trinitarian theologies (found in the East and West) as possessing a harmonious logic, as seen in the independent accounts of Gregory of Nyssa and Augustine of Hippo. He then focussed on two different, though connected, pursuits: the development of Latin Trinitarian theology in the third and early fourth centuries, and the development of pneumatology in the early church. His article, "Irenaeus' Trinitarian Theology", in Nova et Vetera, covered these topics. While Barnes can be fiercely critical of some scholarly work of other scholars, his own work has often developed in cooperation with other scholars: Dan Williams, Alexander Golitzin, and Lewis Ayres come to mind as examples of cooperative research.

== Collaboration with Lewis Ayres ==
Along with Lewis Ayres, professor of Catholic and historical theology in the University of Durham, and Archbishop of Canterbury Rowan Williams, Barnes is part of a rereading of Augustine's trinitarian theology that contradicts the older, neoplatonic-centered account. In his 2007 doctoral dissertation, Keith Edward Johnson referred to his new reading as "New Canon" Augustine scholarship. From a footnote in Johnson's dissertation (p. 108 n. 189), that name would appear to have been taken from a publication by Barnes; however, the bibliography does not provide further details. Barnes's and Ayres's work suggests that Augustine has been read primarily with a non-theological focus, and needs a theological or doctrinal re-reading. Some have expressed hope that their work will eventually result in a new theological biography of Augustine. The basis of the New Canon reading of Augustine was worked out from 1995 to 2000, during which Ayres and Barnes conducted an almost daily common reading and discussion, via e-mail, of Augustine's trinitarian writings.

The mutuality of Barnes's and Ayres's partnership is evident from the following comments in their respective papers, "Remember you are Catholic" and "Rereading Augustine on the Trinity":

Barnes, 'Rereading Augustine on the Trinity', in Stephen Davis, Daniel Kendall, and Gerald O'Collins (eds.), "The Trinity" (Oxford: Oxford University Press, 1999), p. 148n.4.	Ayres, 'Remember you are Catholic: Augustine on the Unity of the Triune God', Journal of Early Christian Studies 8.1 (2000), p. 42
'Since 1995 my work on Augustine has been conducted in continuous conversation with Lewis Ayres (Trinity College, Dublin) regarding his work on parallel and overlapping themes. Our daily exchange of research and texts via email means that it is difficult to acknowledge all the points at which this detailed conversation has influenced both our accounts.'	'Since 1995 my work on Augustine has been conducted in continuous conversation with Michel Barnes and his work on parallel and overlapping themes. Our virtually daily exchange of research and texts via email means that it is difficult to acknowledge all the points at which this detailed conversation has influenced both our accounts, though I have tried to do so throughout the paper in particularly important cases.'

In 2015 Barnes returned to the question of the lingering influence of 19th-century doctrinal narratives upon later receptions of Patristic theology. In 2015 Barnes began his focus on the Christologies of the “Life of Jesus” genre that was so characteristic of the 19th-century German “Quest for the Historical Jesus”. More recently Barnes's interest in 18th- and 19th-century Christology has included the literature of German and English Pietism, as well as proponents of “universal salvation” – e.g., Isaak Dorner. The two major projects that await publication are: Barnes's study of the continuity of Pneumatology between Second Temple Judaism and Early Christianity; and a book of essays on Pro-Nicene Trinitarian theologies. The expected monograph on Augustine's Trinitarian theology has been postponed in the wake of the numerous studies on that topic published in the last ten years, but the project has definitely not been abandoned: a preliminary version of this study exists as the secondary source text for Barnes's doctoral seminars at Marquette University on Augustine.

Upon retirement Barnes sought to re-kindle old interests held at bay by the responsibilities of teaching – principally questions of doctrine and hermeneutics. He is currently researching congruency between early twentieth century French Catholic theology and early twentieth century French Phenomenology.

Circumstances have also led Barnes to return to the subject of some of his earlier publications: the moral psychology of Gregory of Nyssa. (Note: See, e.g., “The Polemical Context and Content of Gregory of Nyssa's Psychology,” Medieval Philosophy and Theology 4 (1994), 1–28.) The unexpected death in 2012 of his colleague, Dr. Ralph Dell Colle, led to an article on the link for Gregory between mortality and sexuality; research on Life of Macrina and On the Soul and Resurrection was further developed in 2016 for the Chicago Theology Initiative, and that work is in press (Spring, 2017).

Barnes is the grandson of the French artists, Joseph Henri Ponchin, and the great-grandson of Antoine Ponchin, and he has significant art holdings from both artists, particularly those painted in French Indochina. He holds both American and French citizenships.
