= Thomas Hopko =

American Eastern Orthodox theologian and priest (1939–2015)

The Very Rev. Protopresbyter Thomas Hopko
- Dean Emeritus of the St. Vladimir's Orthodox Theological Seminary
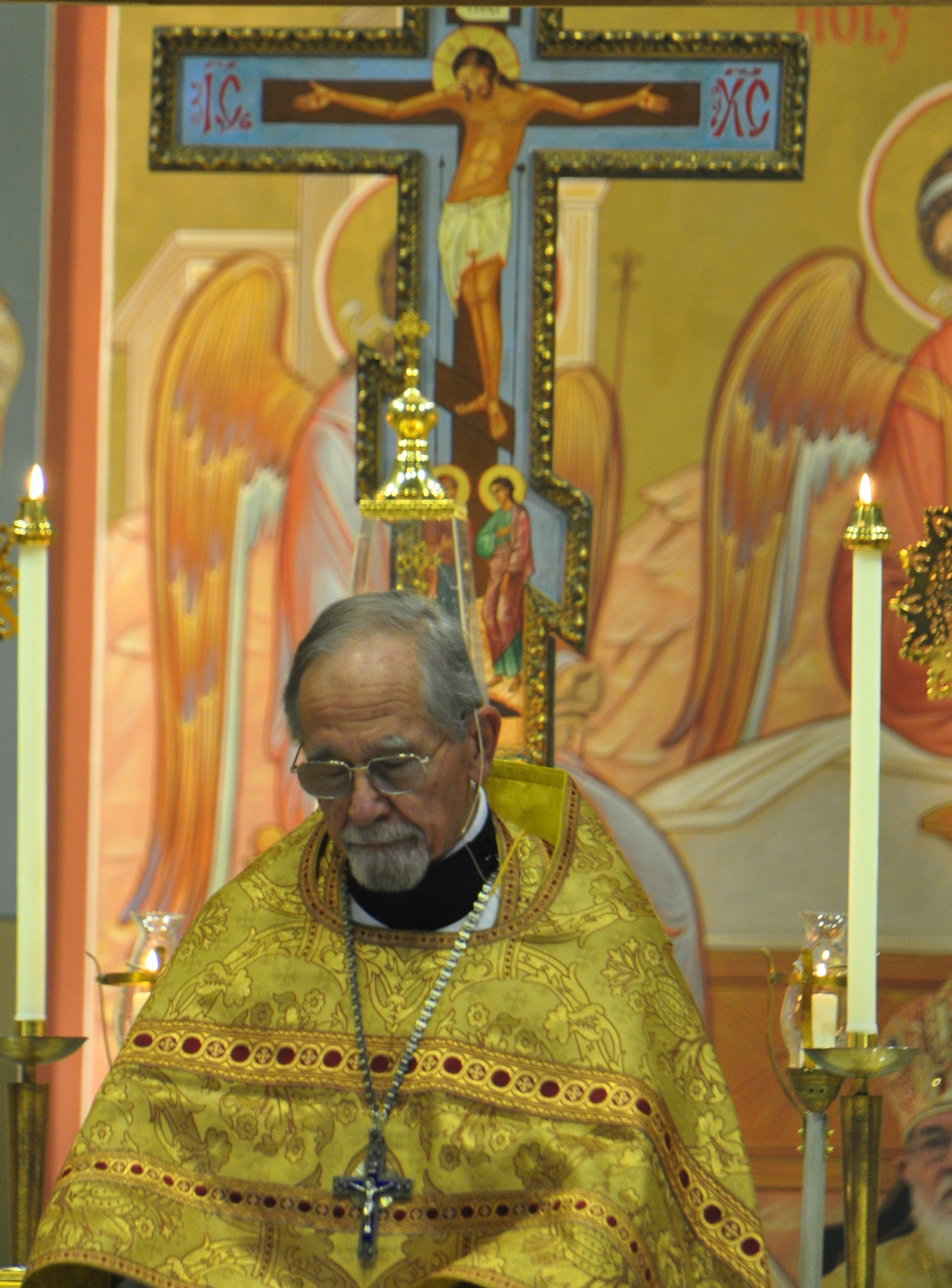
- Hopko at 17th All-American Council in 2012
- Church: Orthodox Church in America
- Other post: See list: Rector: Church of St. John The Baptist (Warren, OH, 1963-8); Church of St. Gregory the Theologian (Wappingers Falls, NY, 1968-78); Church St. Nicholas (Jamaica Estates, NY, 1978-83); During tenure at St. Vladimir's Orthodox Theological Seminary: Lecturer in Doctrine and Pastoral Theology, 1968–72; Assistant Professor of Dogmatic Theology, 1972–83; Associate Professor of Dogmatic Theology, 1983–1991; Professor of Dogmatic Theology, 1991–2; Dean, Rector of Three Hierarchs Chapel, and Professor of Dogmatic Theology, 1992–2002

Orders
- Ordination: August 1963

Personal details
- Born: March 28, 1939 Endicott, New York, US
- Died: March 18, 2015 (aged 75) Wexford, Pennsylvania, US
- Buried: The Orthodox Monastery of the Transfiguration
- Denomination: Eastern Orthodox Church
- Spouse: Anne Schmemann (m. 1963)
- Children: 5
- Education: Fordham University (1960, B.A. in Russian Studies; 1982 Ph.D. in Theology, St. Vladimir's Orthodox Theological Seminary (1963, M.Div.) and Duquesne University (1969, M.A. in Philosophy)

Thomas John Hopko (March 28, 1939 – March 18, 2015) was an Eastern Orthodox Christian priest and theologian. He was the Dean of Saint Vladimir’s Orthodox Theological Seminary from September 1992 until July 1, 2002, and taught dogmatic theology there from 1968 until 2002. In retirement, he carried the honorary title of Dean Emeritus.

== Life ==
=== Early life and education ===
Thomas Hopko was born in Endicott, New York of Rusyn descent. His ancestors are linked to the Rusyn village of Navitske (now Nevyts'ke) near the city of Uzhhorod. He was baptized and raised in St. Mary’s Carpatho-Russian Orthodox Greek-Catholic Church, Endicott. He gained his B.A. in Russian studies at Fordham University in 1960, followed by a Master of Divinity degree at St. Vladimir's Orthodox Theological Seminary in 1963. He later completed a master's degree in philosophy at Duquesne University in 1968 and a Ph.D. in theology at Fordham University in 1982. At St. Vladimir's Seminary, Hopko studied with such renowned Orthodox theologians as Fr. Alexander Schmemann, Fr. John Meyendorff, Nicholas Arseniev and Serge Verkhovskoy.

=== Priestly ministry and career as professor, seminary dean and lecturer ===
He was ordained to the priesthood in 1963 and served several parishes in the states of Ohio and New York. In 1968 he began to teach at St. Vladimir's and eventually succeeded his teacher Serge Verkhovskoy as professor of dogmatic theology. He was elevated to the rank of archpriest in 1970 and to the rank of protopresbyter in 1995. Known both in Orthodox and ecumenical circles, he served as a member of the Faith and Order Commission of the World Council of Churches and as a delegate from the Orthodox Church in America to the Assemblies of WCC in Uppsala, Sweden, and Nairobi, Kenya. He was also President of the Orthodox Theological Society in America from 1992 to 1995. During his years of priestly ministry, Fr. Thomas authored numerous books and articles. The most well known of these publications is The Orthodox Faith: An Elementary Handbook on the Orthodox Church. A prolific speaker and preacher, he spoke at conferences, retreats, public lectures, and church gatherings of all kinds, many of which were recorded.

=== Retirement ===
After retiring in 2002 from his position as Dean of St Vladimirs´s Seminary, Hopko moved to Ellwood City, Pennsylvania, where he frequently served at the Women´s Monastery of the Holy Transfiguration. Starting at 2008, he had several popular podcasts on Ancient Faith Radio. He continued to speak at various events in his retirement.

=== Death ===
Hopko died of complications from congestive heart failure due to amyloidosis on March 18, 2015, in the Pittsburgh suburb of Wexford, Pennsylvania. He was survived by his wife and five children. Days before his death, his daughter Juliana created a blog wherein she provided periodic status updates about his declining health and eventual death. He was buried by the Bishops of the Orthodox Church in America in the Monastery of the Transfiguration in Ellwood City, Pennsylvania, on March 23, 2015.

== Works ==
=== Podcasts ===
- Speaking the Truth in Love (Ancient Faith Radio, 2008–2015)
- The Names of Jesus (Ancient Faith Radio, 2009–2010)
- Worship in Spirit and Truth (Ancient Faith Radio, 2011–2015)

=== Cassettes ===
==== Videocassettes ====
- The Holy Trinity (SVS Press)
- Mary: Icon of Human Perfection (SVS Press)
- The Church of Christ (SVS Press)
- The Church and Liturgy (SVS Press)
- The Church and Salvation (SVS Press)

==== Audiocassettes ====
- The Lord's Prayer - 10 Lectures (SVS Press)
- The Apocalypse - 4 Lectures (SVS Press)
- Praying with Icons - Lecture and Sermon (SVS Press)
- Ordination of Women: the Contemporary Debate (SVS Press)
- A Theology of Gender (SVS Press)
- Dynamics of Religion in American Society (SVS Press)
- Orthodox Spirituality (SVS Press)
- Theology of Work (SVS Press)
- The Work of God's People (2 cassettes) (SVS Press)
- The Word of the Cross (2 cassettes) (SVS Press)
- The Love of God (2 cassettes) (SVS Press)
- Monastic Elder and Parish Priest (SVS Press)
- Monastic Elder and Parish Priest -- Discussion (SVS Press)
- The Church of Christ (SVS Press)
- The Church and Liturgy (SVS Press)
- The Church and Liturgy -- Discussion (SVS Press)
- The Church and Salvation (SVS Press)
- The Church and Salvation -- Discussion (SVS Press)
- Wisdom! Let Us Attend (2 cassettes) (SVS Press)
- Only Christ (2 cassettes) (SVS Press)
- Victorious Living in a Godless World (4 cassettes) (SVS Press)

=== Bibliography ===
- The Orthodox Faith-series (SVS Press, 1972-1976 (revised 2016))
  - The Orthodox Faith Volume One: Doctrine and Scripture
  - The Orthodox Faith Volume Two: Worship
  - The Orthodox Faith Volume Three: Church History
  - The Orthodox Faith Volume Four: Spirituality
- The Spirit of God (Morehouse Barlowe, 1976)
- All the Fulness of God: Essays on Orthodoxy, Ecumenism and Modern Society (SVS Press, 1982)
- Women and the Priesthood (SVS Press, 1983 (revised & expanded 1999))
- The Lenten Spring: Readings for Great Lent (SVS Press, 1983)
- The Winter Pascha: Readings for the Christmas-Epiphany Season (SVS Press, 1984)
- If We Confess Our Sins: Preparation and Prayers (SVS Press, 1998)
- Speaking The Truth In Love: Education, Mission, And Witness In Contemporary Orthodoxy (SVS Press, 2004)
- Christian Faith and Same-Sex Attraction (Conciliar Press, 2006)
- The Names of Jesus: Discovering the Person of Jesus Christ through Scripture (Ancient Faith Publishing, 2015 (posthumously))

Academic offices
Preceded by John Meyendorff	Dean of Saint Vladimir's Orthodox Theological Seminary; 1992-2002	Succeeded by John H. Erickson
