= Ionuț-Alexandru Tudorie =

Romanian church historian and Orthodox theologian

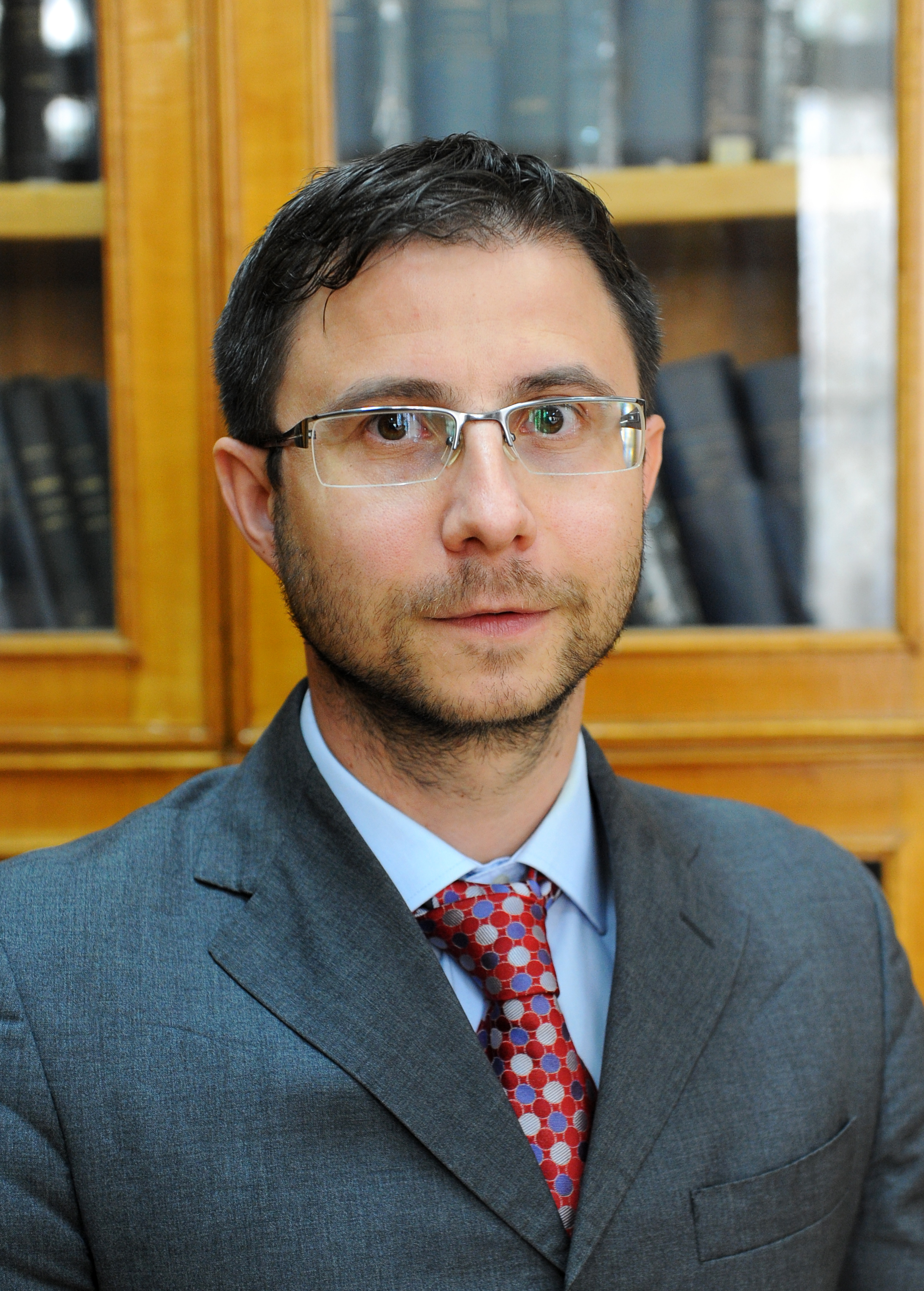
- Born: July 21, 1977 (age 48); Constanța, Romania
- Occupations: Historian, Theologian, Byzantinist
- Spouse: Denisa Mihaela Tudorie
- Children: 2

Ionuț-Alexandru Tudorie (born July 21, 1977, Constanța) is a Romanian church historian, Orthodox theologian, and Byzantinist. As of July 1, 2025, he serves as the Dean of St. Vladimir's Orthodox Theological Seminary (SVOTS) in Yonkers, New York. He previously served as Professor of Church History and as the Academic Dean and President of the institution.

Tudorie is also affiliated with the University of Bucharest, Romania, where he is a doctoral advisor in Cultural Studies at the Interdisciplinary School of Doctoral Studies (ISDS). His areas of specialization include church history, Byzantine and post-Byzantine history, and theological dialogues between Christian confessions.

== Personal life ==
Tudorie has been married to Denisa Mihaela Tudorie since 2004. They have two daughters.

== Education ==
Tudorie graduated from the Bishop Chesarie Theological Seminary of Buzău. He pursued higher education at the University of Bucharest, earning a Bachelor of Arts in Pastoral Theology in 2000 and a Master of Arts in Historical Theology in 2001. In 2008, he completed his first Doctor of Philosophy in Theology with a dissertation regarding the Porvoo Common Statement. This research was subsequently published as a contributing chapter in the commemorative volume Towards Closer Unity: Communion of the Porvoo Churches 20 Years.

He continued his studies with a Master of Arts in the History of South-Eastern Europe in 2003 and earned a second Doctor of Philosophy in Byzantine History in 2014. His dissertation, State-Church Relations in Byzantium under Michael VIII Palaiologos (1259–82), received the highest distinction, exceptional/summa cum laude. This work served as the basis for his 2025 monograph published by Edinburgh University Press.

== Academic career ==
Tudorie began his academic career at the Department of Orthodox Theology of the University of Bucharest, serving as a Tutor (2002–2004), Teaching Assistant (2004–2008), and Lecturer (2008–2018). In 2019, he was appointed as a doctoral advisor in Cultural Studies at the Interdisciplinary School of Doctoral Studies of the University of Bucharest.

Since 2018, Tudorie has been a professor of Church History at St. Vladimir's Orthodox Theological Seminary. He served as Academic Dean (2018–2025) and was appointed President in February 2025. On July 1, 2025, he began his five-year term as Dean of the Seminary. He also serves as the Editor-in-Chief of St. Vladimir's Theological Quarterly since 2020.

== Reception and scholarship ==
Tudorie's work has been analyzed in major international peer-reviewed journals. His monograph, Autoritatea imperială în criză (2016), was reviewed in the Jahrbuch der Österreichischen Byzantinistik, which noted its contribution to the study of the Palaiologan Renaissance. His co-edited volume, The Manifold Faces of the East (2024), received an independent review in the Journal of Ecclesiastical History published by Cambridge University Press.

== Research ==
Tudorie's research intersects theology and history, focusing on Byzantine imperial ideology, relations between spiritual and political authorities in Byzantium, contemporary Byzantine historiography, accounts of Western travelers to Constantinople in the late 16th century and relations between the Greek Orthodox community and Ottoman rulers (15th–17th centuries), with emphasis on Patriarch Dositheos II of Jerusalem (1669–1707).

He has participated in research projects and fellowships, including positions at Dumbarton Oaks Research Library and Collection, Harvard University; the Austrian Academy of Sciences; and the Central European University.

=== Books ===
- Tudorie, Ionuț-Alexandru (2025). Imperial Authority in Crisis: Michael VIII Palaiologos (1258–1282) and the Relations between the Byzantine State and the Church. Edinburgh: Edinburgh University Press.
  - Preliminary version published in Romanian:
    - Tudorie, Ionuț-Alexandru (2016). Autoritatea imperială în criză: Mihail VIII Paleologul (1258–1282) și raporturile Statului bizantin cu Biserica (in Romanian). Brăila: Editura Istros.
- Tudorie, Ionuț-Alexandru (2012). Cu frică s-au temut acolo unde nu era frică… Istoria dialogului teologic dintre anglicanii nonjurori și Biserica Răsăriteană (1716–1725) [There Were They in Great Fear, Where No Fear Was... The History of the Theological Dialogue Between Nonjuror Anglicans and the Eastern Church (1716–1725)]. Studia Oecumenica (in Romanian). Vol. 8. Cluj-Napoca: Presa Universitară Clujeană.
- Tudorie, Ionuț-Alexandru (2012). De la Reformă la unitatea vizibilă deplină: dialogul teologic dintre anglicani și luterani [From Reformation to Full Visible Unity: Theological Dialogue Between Anglicans and Lutherans]. Studia Oecumenica (in Romanian). Vol. 6. Cluj-Napoca: Presa Universitară Clujeană.

=== Edited volumes ===
- Tudorie, Ionuț-Alexandru; Benga, Daniel, eds. (2024). The Manifold Faces of the East: Western Images of the Post-Byzantine Christian World in the Age of Reformation. Eastern Church Identities. Vol. 18. Paderborn: Brill | Schöningh.
- Năsturel, Petre Ș. (2019). Antoche, Emanuel Constantin; Cotovanu, Lidia; Tudorie, Ionuț-Alexandru (eds.). Études d'histoire byzantine et post-byzantine. Bibliothèque de l’Institut d’Études Sud-Est Européennes (in French). Vol. 8. Brăila: Editura Istros a Muzeului Brăilei Carol I.
- The Time Has Come: Debates over the OCA Autocephaly Reflected in St. Vladimir’s Quarterly. Yonkers, NY: St. Vladimir's Seminary Press, 2020.
- Tudorie, Ionuț-Alexandru, ed. (2020). The Time Has Come: Debates over the OCA Autocephaly Reflected in St Vladimir's Quarterly. Yonkers, NY: St Vladimir’s Seminary Press.
- Carabă, Vasile-Adrian; Nazâru, Sebastian-Laurențiu; Tudorie, Ionuț-Alexandru, eds. (2019). Biserică și Stat: perspective teologice și istorice. Studii în memoria Părintelui Profesor Adrian Gabor [Church and State: Theological and Historical Perspectives. Studies in Memory of Reverend Professor Adrian Gabor] (in Romanian). Brăila: Muzeul Brăilei Carol I - Editura Istros.
- Blanchet, Marie-Hélène; Tudorie, Ionuț-Alexandru, eds. (2017). L'Apport des Assomptionnistes français aux études byzantines: une approche critique. Actes du colloque de Bucarest, 25-27 septembre 2014. Archives de l’Orient Chrétien (in French). Vol. 21. Paris: Institut français d’études byzantines.
- Carabă, Vasile-Adrian; Tudorie, Ionuț-Alexandru, eds. (2014). Dinamica vieții intelectuale în Bizanțul Paleologilor (1261–1453) sub influența polemicii [The Dynamics of Intellectual Life in Palaiologan Byzantium (1261–1453) Under the Sign of Polemics] (in Romanian). Bucharest: Editura Universității din București.
- Fotie al Constantinopolului (2013). Coman, Oana; Tudorie, Ionuț-Alexandru; Muraru, Adrian (eds.). Mistagogia Duhului Sfânt. Exegeză la Noul Testament [Mystagogy of the Holy Spirit. New Testament Exegesis]. Tradiția creștină (in Romanian and Greek). Vol. 15 (Bilingual ed.). Iași: Editura Polirom.
- Gabor, Adrian; Săsăujan, Mihai; Benga, Daniel; Tudorie, Ionuț-Alexandru, eds. (2017). History of the Patriarch Justinian Faculty of Orthodox Theology (1881–2017). Bucharest: Editura Basilica.
- Boroianu, Dimitrie G. (2007). Tudorie, Ionuț-Alexandru (ed.). Apărătorii dreptei credinţe: studii de Teologie Patristică [The Defenders of the Orthodox Faith: Studies in Patristic Theology] (in Romanian). Bucharest: Editura Anastasia.

=== Translations ===
- Vasiliev, A. A. (2010). Istoria Imperiului Bizantin [History of the Byzantine Empire] (in Romanian). Translated by Tudorie, Ionuț-Alexandru; Carabă, Vasile-Adrian; Nazâru, Sebastian. Introductory Study by Ionuț-Alexandru Tudorie. Iași: Editura Polirom.

=== Selected articles ===
- "Marginalia on Augerius Gislenius Busbequius’ Legationis Turcicae epistolae quatuor (1589)". In The Manifold Faces of the East, pp. 55–86.
- "Romanian Theological Education in the Interwar Period (1926–1938)". Südost-Forschungen, 82 (2023), pp. 385–402.
- "The Eucharistic Controversy between the 'Orthodox' Dositheos II of Jerusalem and the 'Calvinist' Ioannis Karyofyllis (1689–1697)". In Confessionalization and/as Knowledge Transfer in the Greek Orthodox Church, Wiesbaden: Harrassowitz Verlag, 2021, pp. 273–327.
- "Cassianus, natione Scytha: Revisiting an Old Issue". Revue d’histoire ecclésiastique, 115 (2020), pp. 5–33.
- "Academic Research, Cultural Diplomacy and Politics: the French Institute of Byzantine Studies in Bucharest (1937–1947)". In L’Apport des Assomptionnistes français aux études byzantines, pp. 169–211.

== Awards and honors ==
- 2017: His monograph Autoritatea imperială în criză was awarded the Nicolae Iorga Prize by the Romanian Society for Historical Sciences.
- 2019: The MA thesis supervised by Tudorie received the Award of the Senate of the University of Bucharest for the Best MA Thesis in Humanities and the Great Award for the Best MA Thesis of the Academic Year.

== Professional memberships ==
- International Association for Patristic Studies
- International Orthodox Theological Association (Co-chair of the Romanian Orthodoxy Group)
- Romanian Society for Byzantine Studies
- Romanian Association for the History of Religions
- Societas Oecumenica
- Byzantine Studies Association of North America

Academic offices
Preceded by John Behr	Dean of Saint Vladimir's Orthodox Theological Seminary; 2018-Present	Succeeded by Incumbent
