= John H. Erickson =

American scholar

The Very Reverend John H. Erickson
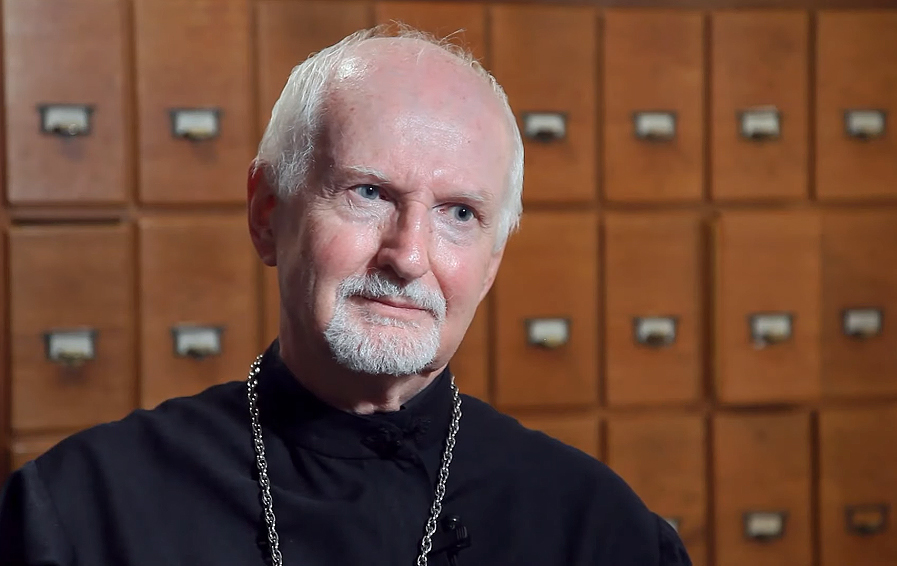
- Born: 4 October 1943 (age 83)
- Years active: 1973–2009
- Title: Peter N. Gramowich Professor of Church History; Dean, SVOTS, 2002–2007; Professor Emeritus

Academic background
- Education: BA Harvard, 1966; MPhil Yale, 1970; ThM SVOTS, 1984; Hon DCL SVOTS, 2013

Academic work
- Discipline: Church historian; Canonist
- Website: www.svots.edu/very-rev-dr-john-h-erickson

John H. Erickson (born 4 October 1943) is an Eastern Orthodox American scholar, with specialization in the areas of Orthodox canon law and church history. From 2002 until 2007, he served as the Dean of Saint Vladimir's Orthodox Theological Seminary in the United States. His term as dean expired on 30 June 2007 and he was replaced by Fr. John Behr.

After growing up in northern Minnesota, Erickson joined the Eastern Orthodox Church in 1964. He studied at Harvard (BA, 1966), Yale (MPhil, 1970), and St Vladimir's Seminary (ThM, 1984).

Erickson began teaching canon law and church history at Saint Vladimir's Seminary in 1973. Over the years, he has been a member of the OCA's Canonical Commission, Department of External Church Relations, Statute Commission, and Department of History and Archives.

On 14 December 2001, he was elected Dean of Saint Vladimir Orthodox Theological Seminary by the school's trustees. He became Dean in July 2002 following the retirement of Fr. Thomas Hopko. Erickson became the first layman, first convert, and first person of non-Russian background to hold the position of Dean since the seminary began.

After four years at the head of the seminary, he was ordained deacon on 30 January 2006 and priest on 7 May 2006. Both ordinations were performed by the Seminary president, Metropolitan Herman (Swaiko) of the Orthodox Church in America.

On 29 June 2006, Metropolitan Herman announced that, in accordance with the decision of the Seminary's Board of Trustees, Fr. Erickson would step down as the Dean of the Seminary after the completion of his current term. He continued teaching at the seminary as Peter N. Gramowich Professor of Church History until his retirement after the 2008–2009 academic year.

In October 2014, Erickson presented "The Eastern Catholic Churches: An Orthodox Perspective" at the conference "The Vatican II Decree on the Eastern Catholic Churches, Orientalium ecclesiarum - Fifty Years Later" organized by the Metropolitan Andrey Sheptytsky Institute of Eastern Christian Studies held at the University of Toronto. (Note: ———— (2014-10-22). The Eastern Catholic Churches: An Orthodox Perspective. YouTube. Metropolitan Andrey Sheptytsky Institute of Eastern Christian Studies. Archived from the original on 2021-01-12.)

== Selected works ==
- Meyendorff, John (1974). Introduction. In the Image and Likeness of God. By Lossky, Vladimir. ————; Bird, Thomas E. (eds.). St. Vladimir's Seminary Press. ISBN 978-0-9138-3613-2. LCCN 85002150. OCLC 642624071. OL 3021943M – via Internet Archive.
- Tarasar, Constance J.; ————, eds. (1975). Orthodox America 1794–1976. Syosset, New York: The Orthodox Church in America Department of History and Archives. LCCN 76368792. OCLC 1245636329. OL 4941373M – via Internet Archive.
- ———— (1991). The Challenge of Our Past: Studies in Orthodox Canon Law and Church History. Crestwood, New York: St. Vladimir's Seminary Press. ISBN 978-0-8814-1086-0. LCCN 91011310. OCLC 488412522. OL 1533573M – via Internet Archive.
- ———— (1992). "The Local Churches and Catholicity: An Orthodox Perspective". The Jurist. 52: 490–508. ISSN 0022-6858.
- Borelli, John; ————, eds. (1996-06-01). The Quest for Unity: Orthodox and Catholics in Dialogue. St. Vladimir's Seminary Press. ISBN 978-0-881-41113-3. LCCN 96023082. OCLC 1176179237. OL 8173360M – via Internet Archive.
- ———— (1999). Orthodox Christians in America. Oxford University Press. ISBN 978-0-1951-0852-1. LCCN 99019901. OCLC 1023011132. OL 35239M.
- Co-editor, five volumes of Orthodox liturgical music (St. Vladimir's Seminary Press).

Academic offices
Preceded by Thomas Hopko	Dean of Saint Vladimir's Orthodox Theological Seminary; 2002-2007	Succeeded by John Behr
