= North American Orthodox–Catholic Theological Consultation =

The North American Orthodox-Catholic Theological Consultation is an ecumenical standing conference that has been meeting semiannually since it was founded in 1965 under the auspices of the Committee on Ecumenical and Interreligious Affairs of the United States Conference of Catholic Bishops and the Standing Conference of the Canonical Orthodox Bishops in the Americas (SCOBA). It works in tandem with the Joint Committee of Orthodox and Catholic Bishops which has been meeting annually since 1981.
