= John McGuckin =

British academic and writer

- Born: 1952 (age 73–74)
- Education: University of London (BD) University of Southampton (MA) Durham University (PhD)

John Anthony McGuckin (born 1952) is a British theologian, church historian, Eastern Orthodox priest, and poet.

== Education ==
McGuckin grew up in Wallsend, Tyne, and Wear, attending St. Cuthbert's Grammar School, Newcastle in 1969. He then attended Heythrop College from 1970 to 1972, graduating from the University of London with a divinity degree in 1975, a Certificate in Education from Newcastle University in 1979, was awarded a PhD by Durham University in 1980, and a MA in educational studies from the University of Southampton in 1986.

== Professional life and affiliations ==
McGuckin was a Principal Lecturer in Theology at La Sainte Union College of Higher Education in Southampton before moving to the University of Leeds in 1989 where he was Reader in Patristic and Byzantine theology. McGuckin was the Nielsen Professor of Early Church History at Union Theological Seminary and Professor of Byzantine Christian Studies at Columbia University in New York City where he also served in the Harriman Institute.

He is an archpriest of the Romanian Orthodox Church and rector of the Orthodox Church in Lytham St. Annes, England. He currently serves on the faculty of church history at Oxford University, and is a fellow of the Royal Historical Society of the United Kingdom.

He has written books on Church Fathers such as Cyril of Alexandria, Gregory of Nazianzus and Origen, among others. His work includes New Testament interpretation, patristics, the history of the Byzantine Empire, and Orthodox theology. He is a scholar of Eastern Christian history.

He is a fellow of both the Royal Society of Arts and the Royal Historical Society. He is director of the Sophia Institute: International Center for Orthodox Thought and Culture, which has its offices on the Union Seminary campus in Manhattan. In 1992 he was given the award of the Brotherhood of Peter Mohyla for his educational services at the Mohyla Academy in the newly independent Ukraine and gave a course of lectures in Patristic theology in the academy buildings after they had been taken back from the possession of the Naval Academy. He was awarded the Jeweled Cross of Moldavia and Bukovina by Romanian Patriarch Daniel in 2007 for his services to the church and the academy. On January, 31, 2014, McGuckin was awarded the second Jeweled Cross by Metropolitan Tikhon of Washington for his services to church and academy. On the occasion of his delivering the 31st Annual Schmemann lecture at St. Vladimir's. In 2014 he was awarded the Doctorate of Divinity Honoris Causa and in 2015 he received an honorary doctorate from the Andrei Saguna School of Theology at Sibiu's Lucian Blaga University.

== Works ==
=== As author ===
- McGuckin, John A. (1982). St Symeon the New Theologian: Chapters and Discourses. Cistercian Publications.
- ——— (1986). The Transfiguration of Christ in Scripture and Tradition. ISBN 0-88946-609-2.
- ——— (1986). Selected Poems of St Gregory Nazianzen.
- ——— (1994). St. Cyril of Alexandria: The Christological Controversy. ISBN 0-88141-259-7.
- ——— (1994). Byzantium and Other Poems. Black Gate Press.
- ——— (1995). At the Lighting of the Lamps: Hymns from the Ancient Church. ISBN 0-8192-1717-4.
- ——— (2000). St. Gregory of Nazianzus: An Intellectual Biography. ISBN 0-88141-222-8. - nominated for the 2002 Pollock Biography Prize
- ——— (2001). Standing in God's Holy Fire: The Spiritual Tradition of Byzantium. Orbis. ISBN 1-57075-382-2.
- ——— (2002). The Book of Mystical Chapters. Shambhala. ISBN 1-59030-007-6.
- ——— (2004). The Westminster Handbook To Patristic Theology. ISBN 0-664-22396-6.
- ——— (2004). The Westminster Handbook To Origen. ISBN 0-664-22472-5.
- ——— (2008). The Orthodox Church: An Introduction to its History, Doctrine, and Spiritual Culture.
- ——— (2010). The Harp of Glory: Enzhira Sebhat. New York: SVS Press.
- ——— (2012). The Ascent of Christian Law: Patristic and Byzantine Reformulations of Antique Civilization. New York: SVS Press.
- ——— (2017). The Path of Christianity: The First Thousand Years. InterVarsity Press.
- ——— (2017). Witnessing the Kingdom:Studies in New Testament History and Theology. Collected Works. vol. 1. New York: SVS Press.
- ——— (2017). Seeing the Glory: Studies in Patristic Theology. Collected works vol. 2. New York: SVS Press.
- ——— (2017). Illumined in the Spirit: Studies in Orthodox Spirituality. Collected works. vol. 3. New York: SVS Press.
- ——— (2020). The Eastern Orthodox Church: A New History. Yale University Press.
- ——— (2022). Origen of Alexandria: Master Theologian of the Early Church. Lexington Books / Fortress Academic.
- ——— (2026). St. Symeon the New Theologian: The Hymns of Divine Eros. New York: SVS Press.

=== As editor ===
- ———, ed. (2011). The Encyclopedia of Eastern Orthodox Christianity (A-M). Vol. 1. Malden, MA & Chichester, UK: Wiley-Blackwell. ISBN 9781405185394. OCLC 874579924.
- ———, ed. (2011). The Encyclopedia of Eastern Orthodox Christianity (N-Z). Vol. 2. Malden, MA & Chichester, UK: Wiley-Blackwell. OCLC 888725802.
- ———, ed. (2014). Orthodox Monasticism Past and Present. New York: Theotokos Press.
- ———, ed. (2014). The Concept of Beauty in Patristic and Byzantine Theology. Saarsbrucken: Scholars Press.
- ———, ed. (2017). The Sacred Arts of Eastern Orthodoxy:Studies in Byzantine Religious Culture. Saarsbrucken: Lambert Academic.
- ———, ed. (2021). T&T Clark Companion to the Early Church. London: T&T Clark.
- ———, ed. (2026). Prayer Book of the Early Church. Brewster. MA: Paraclete Press.
