= Lewis Ayres =

British Catholic theologian

Lewis Ayres, a lay Catholic theologian, is Professor of Catholic and Historical Theology at Durham University in the United Kingdom, and McDonald Agape Distinguished Professor of Early Christian Theology at the Pontifical University of St Thomas (Angelicum) in Rome. Between 2009 and 2013 he served as the inaugural holder of the Bede Chair of Catholic Theology at Durham.

== Biography ==
Lewis Ayres was born and educated in the UK, completing his M.A. at the University of St. Andrews (1988) and his D.Phil. at Merton College, Oxford University (1994). Besides his current positions in the UK and Rome, he has taught in Ireland at Trinity College Dublin and in the United States at Duke University and Emory University. He is also Visiting Professorial Fellow at the Australian Catholic University in Melbourne, at the Institute for Religion and Critical Inquiry. He is married to the moral theologian Medi Ann Volpe, and they have four children.

== Research ==
The core of his research has been Trinitarian theology in Augustine and in the Greek writers of the 4th century. Together with Michel Barnes, and several other scholars Ayres is part of a rereading of Augustine's trinitarian theology.The basis of the New Canon reading of Augustine was worked out in the years 1995–2000, during which Ayres and Barnes conducted an almost daily common reading and discussion, via e-mail, of Augustine's trinitarian writings.

Besides Trinitarian theology in this pivotal period he is also interested in the later development of Christology in the Patristic Period, in the character and development of Scriptural exegesis in Early Christianity, and in modern Catholic theologies of tradition and scripture. He is at present writing a monograph that will concern the shifts in Patristic exegesis between AD 150 and 250. It is provisionally entitled As It Is Written: Ancient Literary Criticism and the Rise of Scripture AD 100–250. In 2024 Ayres delivered the 54th Père Marquette Lecture at Marquette University, now published as Christological Hellenism: A Melancholy Proposal.

Ayres is convinced that the ideological and professional divisions that have arisen between Scripture scholars, "systematic" and "historical" theologians have served Catholic theology ill. He believes that ressourcement theologians have offered us many resources that can move us beyond these divisions, but much further work is necessary for their agenda to be taken forward. Ayres is also currently publishing a series of less academic articles on major themes in Christian faith.

Ayres has also been active in the field as editor of books and series. With his wife, Medi Ann Volpe, he co-edited the Oxford Handbook of Catholic Theology 2019. He has co-edited the Blackwells series Challenges in Contemporary Theology for almost 30 years. He has recently begun to serve as co-editor (with John Behr and Morwenna Ludlow) of the series Oxford Early Christian Studies and Oxford Early Christian Thought.

== Main publications ==
- Nicaea and Its Legacy: An Approach to Trinitarian Theology (Oxford, 2004/6) ISBN 9780198755050
- (with Frances Young and Andrew Louth) The Cambridge History of Early Christian Literature (Cambridge, 2004).
- Augustine and the Trinity (Cambridge, 2010). ISBN 9780511916052
- (with Andrew Radde-Gallwitz and Mark DelCogliano) Works on the Spirit: Athanasius and Didymus the Blind (Crestwood NY, 2012).
- Christological Hellenism: A Melancholy Proposal, Père Marquette Lecture in Theology, (Marquette University Press, 2024) ISBN 9781626005181
- (ed.) The Intellectual World of Late Antique Christianity: Reshaping Classical Traditions (Cambridge University Press, 2024) ISBN 9781108835299

== Articles ==
- Seven Thoughts on How We Should Speak of The Trinity as a Communion (October 12, 2023)
