= Timeline of Eastern Orthodoxy in North America =

The timeline of Eastern Orthodoxy in North America represents a timeline of the historical development of religious communities, institutions and organizations of Eastern Orthodox Christianity in North America.

== Early visits and missions (1700–1900) ==
- 1741 Divine Liturgy celebrated on a Russian ship off the coast of Alaska.
- 1767 A community of Orthodox Greeks establishes itself in New Smyrna Beach, Florida.
- 1787 The US Constitution is drafted in Philadelphia.
- 1794 Missionaries, including St. Herman of Alaska, arrive at Kodiak Island, bringing Orthodoxy to Russian Alaska.
- 1796 Martyrdom of Juvenaly of Alaska.
- 1799 Ioasaph (Bolotov) consecrated in Irkutsk as first bishop for Alaska, but dies in a shipwreck during his return.
- 1803 Louisiana Purchase expands American territory beyond Mississippi River.
- 1804 The double-headed eagle became a motif widely used in Tlingit art, after the Russian-Tlingit Battle of Sitka in 1804, when Aleksandr Baranov, the first governor of colonial Russian Alaska and manager of the Russian-America Company, presented the Kiks.adi Sitka Tlingit leaders with a large medallion on which was found the Russian imperial symbol.
- 1812 Russian colony of Fort Ross established on the coast 60 miles (97 km) north of San Francisco.
- 1816 Martyrdom of Peter the Aleut near San Francisco.
- 1819 Various Spanish territories ceded to United States, including Florida.
- 1824 Fr. John Veniaminov comes to Unalaska, Alaska.
- 1825 First native priest, Jacob Netsvetov.
- 1830 Saints Peter and Paul Russian Orthodox Church is founded on Saint Paul Island (Alaska), in the Bering Sea.
- 1834 Fr. John Veniaminov moves to Sitka, Alaska; liturgy and catechism translated into Aleut.
- 1836 Imperial ukaz regarding Alaskan education issued from Czar Nicholas I that students were to become faithful members of the Orthodox Church, loyal subjects of the Czar, and loyal citizens; Fr. John Veniaminov returns to Russia.
- 1837 Death of St. Herman of Alaska on Spruce Island.
- 1840 Consecration of Fr. John Veniaminov as bishop with the name Innocent.
- 1841 Return of St. Innocent of Alaska to Sitka; sale of Fort Ross property to an American citizen; pastoral school established in Sitka.
- 1843 First mission school for the Eskimos was established at Nushagak by Russian-Greek Orthodox Church.
- 1844 Formation of seminary in Sitka. (Note: In 1844, St. Innocent (Veniaminov) organized the first Orthodox theological school in North America at Sitka, inaugurating a golden age of Orthodox educational ministry and mission in Alaska. This lasted until the catastrophe of the Bolshevik Revolution in 1917, when the last Russian-sponsored parochial school in Alaska closed.)
- 1848 Consecration of St. Michael's Cathedral (Sitka, Alaska); Pacific Southwest annexed by United States from Mexico.
- 1850 Alaskan episcopal see and seminary moved to Yakutsk, Russia.
- 1858 Peter (Sysakoff) consecrated as auxiliary bishop for Alaska with Innocent's primary see moved to Yakutsk.
- 1864 Holy Trinity Church, first Orthodox parish established on United States soil in New Orleans, Louisiana, by Greeks.
- 1865 First Divine Liturgy celebrated in New York City, by Fr. Agapius Honcharenko.
- 1867 Alaska purchased by the United States from Russia; (Note: October 18 is now celebrated as "Alaska Day.") Bp. Paul (Popov) succeeds Bp. Peter.
- 1868 First Russian parish established in US territory in San Francisco, California; St. Innocent of Alaska becomes Metropolitan of Moscow.
- 1870 Diocese of the Aleutian Islands and Alaska formed by the Church of Russia with Bp. John (Metropolsky) as ruling hierarch.
- 1872 See of the Aleutians diocese moved to San Francisco, placing it outside the defined boundaries of the diocese (i.e., Alaska).
- 1876 Bp. John (Metropolsky) recalled to Russia.
- 1878 Bp. Nestor (Zakkis) succeeds John (Metropolsky).
- 1880-1920 Emigration of approximately 400,000 Greeks to the United States, one-fifth of the total population, many as hired labor for the railroads and mines of the American West.
- 1882 Bp. Nestor (Zakkis) drowns in the Bering Sea.
- 1886-1895 In the face of their shamans' inability to treat Old World diseases including smallpox, many Tlingit people (an indigenous people of the Pacific Northwest Coast of North America), converted to Orthodox Christianity. (Note: Russian Orthodox missionaries had translated their liturgy into the Tlingit language. It has been argued that they saw Eastern Orthodox Christianity as a way of resisting assimilation to the "American way of life," which was associated with Presbyterianism.)
- 1888 Bp. Vladimir (Sokolovsky) becomes Bishop of the Aleutians and Alaska.
- 1890 The first Orthodox arrived in Saskatchewan.
- 1891 Fr. Alexis Toth, a Uniate priest, petitions to be received along with his parish in Minneapolis into the Russian Church; Bp. Nicholas (Adoratsky) assigned as Bishop of Alaska but is transferred before taking up his post; Nicholas (Ziorov) becomes ruling bishop of the Alaskan diocese; Holy Trinity Greek Orthodox parish-community is founded in New York. (Note: "In the fall of 1891 there were about 500 male Greeks and perhaps 20 Greek women in New York. The establishment of the Athena Brotherhood intertwined Hellenism and Greek Orthodoxy; from these few sprung forth the first Greek association in this hemisphere and the Holy Trinity Greek Orthodox parish. A small part of an Evangelical church on West 53rd Street near Ninth Avenue was rented at $50.00 per month. Holy Trinity - the second Greek Orthodox church in the Americas and the first in New York City - had found its first home.")
- 1892 Fr. Alexis Toth and his parish in Minneapolis received into the Russian Church; Carpatho-Russian Uniate parishes in Illinois, Connecticut, and several Pennsylvania soon follow suit; first Serbian parish established in Jackson, California; first American-born person ordained, Fr. Sebastian Dabovich.
- 1895 Archim. Raphael (Hawaweeny) arrives in America; first Syrian parish in Brooklyn, New York, founded by St. Raphael of Brooklyn; Fr. John Kochurov arrives in America and becomes priest of the Russian parish in Chicago; Fr. Anatolii Kamenskii arrives in Alaska; first clergy conference, in Wilkes-Barre, Pennsylvania.
- 1896 Bp. Nicholas (Ziorov) reports to the Holy Synod of Russia that "the commemoration of the Emperor and the Reigning House during the divine services brings forth dismay and apprehension among Orthodox in America of non-Russian background"; St. Alexander Hotovitsky appointed as rector in New York; Archdiocesan Cathedral of the Holy Trinity is chartered by a special act of the New York State Legislature, being the first Greek Church founded in New York, and the second Greek Church founded in the Americas. (Note: "Chartered by a special act of the New York State Legislature in 1896, it occupied several locations. In 1904 a permanent church building, an Episcopal church of Gothic architecture at 153 East 72nd Street, was purchased. The first service was held on April 3, 1904. Later that same year, the dynamic Father Methodeos Kourkoules assumed the pastorate and remained its benevolent and resolute spiritual leader until 1940.")
- 1898 Bp. Nicholas (Ziorov) returns to Russia; Tikhon (Belavin) becomes Bishop of the Aleutians and Alaska; American annexation of Hawaii.

== Beyond Alaska (1900–1918) ==
- 1900 Name of Russian mission diocese changed from the Aleutian Islands and Alaska to the Aleutian Islands and North America, thus expanding its territorial boundaries.
- 1901 First Orthodox church in Canada, in Vostok, Alberta.
- 1902 Building of St. Nicholas Cathedral in New York; first Romanian parish in North America founded in Regina, Saskatchewan.
- 1904 Raphael (Hawaweeny) consecrated as Bishop of Brooklyn, becoming the first Orthodox bishop to be consecrated in America; Innocent (Pustinsky) consecrated as Bishop of Alaska; first Romanian parish founded in Cleveland, Ohio.
- 1905 St. Tikhon's Orthodox Monastery (South Canaan, Pennsylvania) founded; Bp. Tikhon (Belavin) raised to the rank of archbishop; seminary opened in Minneapolis; Russian Orthodox see transferred to New York; Fr. Sebastian Dabovich elevated to archimandrite and given charge over Serbian parishes by Tikhon; Episcopal priest of nearly 30 years Dr. Ingram Irvine converted to Orthodoxy, assigned to "English work."
- 1906 In an ukaze dated January 27, addressed to Archbishop Tikhon, the Holy Synod of Russia confirmed the practice of commemorating the American president by name, and not the Russian Tsar, during divine services; blessing of St. Tikhon's Orthodox Monastery by hierarchs Tikhon, Raphael and Innocent; translation of Service Book by Isabel Hapgood.
- 1907 1st All-American Sobor held in Mayfield, PA, at which the name of the Russian mission was declared to be The Russian Orthodox Greek-Catholic Church in North America under the Hierarchy of the Russian Church; Abp. Tikhon (Belavin) returns to Russia and is succeeded in his see by Platon (Rozhdestvensky) as Archbishop of the Aleutians and North America; Uniate Bp. Stephen Ortinsky sent to the US by Rome to stem the tide of Uniate returns to Orthodoxy; Papal decree Ea Semper issued, mandating all Uniate priests in American be celibate; first Sunday of Orthodoxy service in New York; first Bulgarian parish in Madison, Illinois; ordination in Constantinople of first African-American Orthodox priest, the Very Rev. Fr. Raphael Morgan, Priest-Apostolic to America and the West Indies.
- 1908 Church of Constantinople gives care for Greek Orthodox parishes in the US to the Church of Greece; Fr. Theophan Noli celebrates first Divine Liturgy in the Albanian language; first Albanian parish in Boston.
- 1909 Bp. Innocent (Pustynsky) transferred to Russia, succeeded by Alexander (Nemolovsky) as Bishop of Alaska; death of Fr. Alexis Toth.
- 1911 Minneapolis seminary transferred to Tenafly, New Jersey.
- 1913 Serbian clergy vote to come under Serbian Orthodox Church but meet with no official response.
- 1914 Abp. Platon (Rozhdestvensky) recalled to Russia and made bishop of Kishinev, after having received 72 communities (mainly ex-Uniate Carpatho-Russians) into Orthodoxy during his rule; Antiochian Metr. Germanos (Shehadi) of Zahle comes to US to organize parishes without the approval of his synod.
- 1915 Death of St. Raphael of Brooklyn; Abp. Evdokim (Meschersky) succeeds Platon; first monastery for women in Springfield, Vermont.
- 1916 Consecration of Philip (Stavitsky); Alexander (Nemolovsky) appointed Bishop of Canada with his see in Winnipeg; organization of Syrian Holy Orthodox Greek Catholic Mission in North America by Germanos (Shehadi) with founding of St. Mary's Cathedral in Brooklyn, New York; death of Rev. Agapius Honcharenko.
- 1917 Ex-Uniate priest Alexander Dzubay consecrated with the name Stephen as Bishop of Pittsburgh; Archim. Aftimios (Ofiesh) consecrated as Bishop of Brooklyn; St. Tikhon (Belavin) elected Patriarch of Moscow and All Russia at the All Russian Sobor of 1917–1918.
- 1918-24 Emigration of 70,000 Greeks to the United States.

== Revolution and rivalry (1918–1943) ==
- 1918 The Bolshevik Revolution throws the Church of Russia into chaos, effectively stranding the fledgling Russian mission in America; Metr. Meletios (Metaxakis) of Athens arrives in America to organize Greek parishes; Constantinople rescinds temporary transfer of Greek parishes in US to Greece.
- 1919 Southern Church Council meets in Stavropol at which Higher Church Administration was formed in Southern Russia; 2nd All-American Sobor meets in Cleveland, electing Alexander (Nemolovsky) as its new diocesan bishop, and also electing bishops for the Albanian and Serbian communities, pending approval from Moscow (which never comes); Germanos (Shehadi) receives Ukrainians in Canada.
- 1920 St. Tikhon of Moscow issues Ukaz No. 362; first session of the Higher Church Administration outside borders of Russia.
- 1921 34 bishops of The Russian Orthodox Church Outside Russia (ROCOR) meet in synod in Karlovtsy, Serbia, including Metr. Platon (Rozhdestvensky), primate of the Russian Metropolia; death of Fr. Ingram Nathaniel Irvine; in New York City, George Alexander McGuire founded the non-canonical "African Orthodox Church" (AOC), envisaged as a home for Blacks of the Protestant Episcopal persuasion who wanted ecclesiastical independence, based on Apostolic tradition.
- 1922 Church of Greece transfers control of its parishes to the Church of Constantinople; founding of Greek Orthodox Archdiocese of America; Russian Metropolia convenes 3rd All-American Sobor in Pittsburgh, Pennsylvania.
- 1924 4th All-American Sobor of the Metropolia votes to establish "temporary self-government," breaking administrative ties with Moscow; Victor (Abo-Assaley) consecrated as the first Antiochian Archbishop of New York and All North America; Bp. Stephen (Dzubay) returns to the Unia; Ukrainians in Canada join Ukrainian Autocephalous Orthodox Church (UAOC) (non-canonical).
- 1926 Metr. Platon (Rozhdestvensky) of the Metropolia breaks ties with the ROCOR synod; founding of Serbian diocese.
- 1927 ROCOR synod sends epistle to American parishes suspending Platon and his clergy; founding of the American Orthodox Catholic Church by the Russian Metropolia under Aftimios Ofiesh; founding of Federated Russian Orthodox Clubs (FROC) in Pittsburgh; consecration of Emmanuel (Abo-Hatab).
- 1928 Ukrainian diocese established; consecration of Sophronios (Beshara).
- 1929 Romanian Orthodox Episcopate established, under the Romanian Orthodox Church.
- 1930 Abp. Joasaph (Skorodumov) ("The Enlightener of Canada") becomes the founding bishop of the Canadian Diocese of ROCOR; Emmanuel (Abo-Hatab) leaves the American Orthodox Catholic Church (AOCC) and returns to Metropolia, re-establishing Brooklyn diocese.
- 1931 Abp. Athenagoras (Spyrou) becomes primate of Greek Orthodox Archdiocese of America (1931–1948).
- 1933 Metr. Platon (Rozhdestvensky) refuses to pledge loyalty to Moscow, which declares the Metropolia to be in schism and establishes the Russian Exarchate of North America (1933–1970); Platon grants canonical release to Syrian parishes remaining under the Metropolia to come under the Church of Antioch; Germanos (Shehadi) returns to Lebanon; consecration of Leontius (Turkevich); marriage and apostasy of Ignatius (Nichols) (first with Living Church and then independently).
- 1934 Death of Platon; Theophilus (Pashkovsky) of San Francisco elected primate of Metropolia at 5th All-American Sobor in Cleveland, Ohio; death of Germanos (Shehadi) in Lebanon; Abp. Athenagoras (Spyrou) established the "Orthodox Observer", providing a wide range of news and information about the Church, its ministries, and the activities of its many communities to a readership that now exceeds 500,000.
- 1935 "Temporary Regulations of the Russian Orthodox Church Abroad" signed by ROCOR synod in Karlovtsy, Serbia, including Metr. Theophilus (Pashkovsky) of the Metropolia, thus renewing relations; ROCOR is divided into four regions, including North America with Theophilus as the regional primate.
- 1936 Metr. Anthony (Bashir) consecrated for the Antiochian Orthodox Archdiocese of New York; on the same day (April 19), three Metropolia bishops consecrate rival Abp. Samuel (David) for the Syrians, thus solidifying the developing schism in the Antiochian faithful in the US (the "Russi-Antaaki" split).
- 1937 6th All-American Sobor of the Metropolia declares itself to report to ROCOR in matters of faith; Holy Cross Theological School founded in Pomfret, Connecticut; Ukrainian diocese established by Church of Constantinople.
- 1938 St. Vladimir's Orthodox Theological Seminary (Crestwood, New York) and St. Tikhon's Orthodox Theological Seminary (South Canaan, Pennsylvania) founded; Abp. Samuel (David) of Toledo excommunicated by the Church of Antioch for disobedience to canonical order; Bulgarian Orthodox Church founded the Bulgarian Church Mission Diocese in North America, appointing Bp. Andrey Velicki administrator; Carpatho-Russian diocese established by Ecumenical Patriarchate of Constantinople with second wave of Uniate returns to Orthodoxy.
- 1941 Church of Antioch restores Abp. Samuel (David) of Toledo to communion and declares his diocese to be the Antiochian Orthodox Archdiocese of Toledo and Dependencies.

== Emergence of American Orthodoxy (1943–1970) ==
- 1943 Founding of Federated Orthodox Greek Catholic Primary Jurisdictions in America, a proto-SCOBA body.
- 1944 Canadian Council of Churches is formed.
- 1946 7th All-American Sobor of the Russian Metropolia breaks all ties with the ROCOR; Holy Cross Greek Orthodox School of Theology moved to Brookline, Massachusetts.
- 1947 Death of Ignatius (Nichols).
- 1948 Abp. Michael (Konstantinides) heads the Greek Orthodox Archdiocese of America (1948–1958); as a result of political events in the Balkans, Bp. Andrey Velicki rejected the jurisdiction of the Holy Synod in Bulgaria.
- 1950 Formation of the Romanian Orthodox Missionary Episcopate in America, chartered by a decision of the Romanian Holy Synod; ROCOR moves headquarters to New York; Metr. Leontius (Turkevich) becomes primate of Metropolia at 8th All-American Sobor in New York City; National Council of Churches, USA, is organized.
- 1951 Arrival of Fr. Alexander Schmemann in the United States from Paris, taking up teaching duties at St. Vladimir's Orthodox Theological Seminary (Crestwood, New York).
- 1954 Recognition of Toledo Archdiocese by Church of Antioch.
- 1955 Founding of the Council of Eastern Orthodox Churches of Central Massachusetts; 9th All-American Sobor of Metropolia held in New York City.
- 1956 Dr. Constantine Cavarnos founds the Institute for Byzantine and Modern Greek Studies in Belmont, Massachusetts.
- 1958 Death of Metr. Samuel (David) of Toledo; reception of Society of Clerks Secular of St. Basil into Antiochian New York Archdiocese, forming Antiochian Western Rite Vicariate.
- 1959 Archbishop Iakovos (Coucouzis) is elected and enthroned as Primate of the Greek Archdiocese of North and South America (1959–96); 10th All-American Sobor of the Metropolia was held in New York City.
- 1960 Founding of the Standing Conference of the Canonical Orthodox Bishops in the Americas (SCOBA); Romanian Orthodox Episcopate received into the Metropolia.
- 1961 First ever visit of a Greek Orthodox Patriarch to Canada, as Patr. Benedict of Jerusalem begins a North-American tour to raise funds for the restoration of the shrines in the Holy Land; consecration of Antiochian Abp. Michael (Shaheen) of Toledo.
- 1962 Antiochian Toledo archdiocese recognized by the Church of Antioch as equal to the New York archdiocese.
- 1963 Autonomous Serbian diocese created; beginning of rapprochement between Metropolia and Moscow Patriarchate (MP); arguing that the Metropolia's 1924 declaration of "temporary self-government" amounted to a canonical declaration of autocephaly, Toward an American Orthodox Church is published by St. Vladimir's professor Alexander Bogolepov, galvanizing the Metropolia to seek autocephaly; Abp. Iakovos (Coucouzis) vigorously supported the passage of the Civil Rights Act of 1964 that was introduced by President John F. Kennedy in his civil rights speech of June 11, 1963.
- 1964 Metr. Andrei Velicki petitioned the Holy Synod of the Church of Bulgaria for his return to the Bulgarian episcopacy, forming the Bulgarian Eastern Orthodox Diocese of the USA, Canada and Australia; Philaret (Voznesensky) becomes First Hierarch of the ROCOR (1964–1985).
- 1965 Bulgarian Diocese in Exile established under ROCOR (1965–1976); SCOBA appeals to mother churches to allow concrete steps to be taken toward American Orthodox unity; at 12th All-American Sobor, Ireney (Bekish) succeeds Metr. Leontius (Turkevich) as primate of the Metropolia; North American Orthodox-Catholic Theological Consultation founded, meeting twice yearly; Abp. Iakovos (Coucouzis) marched next to Dr. Martin Luther King Jr. in the Selma to Montgomery marches, captured on the cover of LIFE Magazine, March 26, 1965.
- 1966-1980 About 160,000 Greeks emigrated to the US.
- 1966 Death of Metr. Anthony (Bashir); election and consecration of Philip (Saliba) as Metropolitan of the Syrian Orthodox Christian Archdiocese of New York; founding of Hellenic College (Brookline, Massachusetts); death of St. John Maximovitch; death of Aftimios Ofiesh; Fr. Alexander Schmemann travels to Constantinople to intercede for Metropolia but is rebuffed; first founding of Orthodox Inter-Seminary Movement (OISM).
- 1967 Consecration of Theodosius (Lazor) of Sitka; Church of Constantinople orders Greek Archdiocese to suspend communion with the Metropolia; 13th All-American Sobor of Metropolia held in New York City.
- 1968 Meeting between Metropolia representatives and Moscow Patriarchate in Upsala, Sweden, discussing autocephaly for the Metropolia; Synod of Bishops of the Metropolia decides to start official exploratory negotiations with MP.
- 1969 Consecration of Dmitri (Royster) (seen by many to be first convert bishop); official autocephaly meetings of Metropolia with Moscow Patriarchate take place on New York City, Tokyo and Geneva; Metr. Philaret (Voznesensky) of New York issues the first of a series of "Sorrowful Epistles" (1969,1971,1975) to the primates of the local Orthodox Churches, condemning forays into ecumenism.

== Union and division (1970–1994) ==
- 1970 Russian Metropolia reconciles with the Church of Russia and is granted autocephaly, changing its name to the Orthodox Church in America (OCA), an act accepted by some Orthodox autocephalous churches worldwide, but condemned as uncanonical by the majority, including all four ancient patriarchates and the Church of Greece; Constantinople ceases all official contact with the OCA and declares it uncanonical; 14th All-American Sobor/1st All-American Council accepts autocephaly Tomos and approves new name of Orthodox Church in America (OCA); the Russian Exarchate of North America is dissolved, but the majority of its parishes remain under the Church of Russia; glorification of St. Herman of Alaska in separate services by the ROCOR and the OCA.
- 1971 ROCOR denounces Moscow's grant of autocephaly to the Metropolia; OCA receives rebel ROCOR parish in Australia; Albanian Archdiocese received into the OCA at 2nd All-American Council held at St. Tikhon's Monastery, South Canaan, PA.
- 1972 OCA receives the Mexican National Catholic Church, creating its Exarchate of Mexico.
- 1973 The 3rd All-American Council of OCA held in Pittsburgh, PA.
- 1974 The Church of Romania approved the elevation of the Romanian Orthodox Missionary Episcopate in America (formed in 1950) to that of an Archdiocese, forming the Romanian Orthodox Archdiocese of America and Canada; 3rd All-Diaspora Council of ROCOR held in Jordanville, New York; OCA Metropolitan Ireney (Bekish) goes into semi-retirement, while his duties are taken up by Archbishop Sylvester (Haruns) of Montreal.
- 1975 "Russi-Antaaki" division in the Antiochian church in North America overcome by Metr. Philip (Saliba) of New York and Metr. Michael (Shaheen) of Toledo by the uniting of the two Syrian archdioceses into one Antiochian Orthodox Christian Archdiocese of North America, led by Metr. Philip; 4th All-American Council of OCA held in Cleveland, Ohio.
- 1976 Reception into the OCA of the ROCOR's Bulgarian Diocese in Exile and its hierarch, Bishop Kyrill (Yonchev), becoming the OCA's Bulgarian Diocese.
- 1977 OCA holds its 5th All-American Council in Montreal, electing Theodosius (Lazor) as its metropolitan, replacing the retiring Ireney (Bekish); glorification in Russia of St. Innocent of Alaska.
- 1981 The Patriarch Athenagoras Orthodox Institute (PAOI) is founded in Berkeley, California; OCA primatial see transferred from New York to Washington.
- 1982 Calendar schism in OCA Diocese of E. Pennsylvania, ROCOR receiving multiple parishes in the area.
- 1985 Founding of Orthodox Christian Mission Center (OCMC) as Greek Archdiocesan Mission Center; martyrdom of Father John (Karastamatis) of Santa Cruz.
- 1986 8th All-American Council of OCA held in Washington, D.C.
- 1987 Majority of the parishes of the Evangelical Orthodox Church are received into the Antiochian Archdiocese by Metr. Philip (Saliba), becoming the Antiochian Evangelical Orthodox Mission (AEOM).
- 1988 Healing of schism between two Serbian dioceses.
- 1989 Glorification in Russia of St. Tikhon of Moscow; controversial spiritual leader Elder Ephraim begins founding strict Athonite-style monasteries in North America; 9th All-American Council of OCA held in Saint Louis, Missouri.
- 1990 Contact between Constantinople and the OCA resumes.
- 1992 Founding of International Orthodox Christian Charities (IOCC); 10th All-American Council of OCA held in Miami, Florida.

== Ligonier and beyond (1994–present) ==
- 1994 Bicentennial of Orthodox Christianity in North America (1794–1994); Ligonier Meeting in Western Pennsylvania at the Antiochian Village held by the majority of Orthodox hierarchs in North America votes to do away with the notion of Orthodox Christians in America being a "diaspora" and pledges to work together in missions; glorification of St. Alexis of Wilkes-Barre by OCA; Orthodox Christian Mission Center becomes a SCOBA agency and changes to its current name; glorification in Russia of Ss. John Kochurov and Alexander Hotovitsky; glorification by ROCOR of St. John Maximovitch.
- 1995 Death of Bp. Gerasimos (Papadopoulos) of Abydos; 11th All-American Council of OCA held in Chicago, Illinois.
- 1996 Allegedly forced retirement of Greek Archbishop Iakovos (Coucouzis) of America, being replaced by Spyridon (Papageorge); Ukrainian Orthodox Church of America joins Ukrainian Orthodox Church of the USA, coming under Constantinople.
- 1997 Visit by Ecumenical Patriarch Bartholomew I (Archontonis) of Constantinople to US, heralded as a Bridge Builder and Peacemaker and awarded the Congressional Gold Medal by the U.S. Congress.
- 1998 Ben Lomond Crisis in the (formerly EOC) Antiochian parish of Ss. Peter and Paul (Ben Lomond, California) gains national attention; multiple clergy are laicized and/or excommunicated; the International Religious Freedom Act is passed in the US to promote religious freedom as a foreign policy of the United States, and to advocate on the behalf of the individuals viewed as persecuted in foreign countries on the account of religion; the Toronto Orthodox Theological Academy is founded, under the auspices of the Greek Orthodox Metropolis of Toronto (Canada); the Holy Synod of the Ecumenical Patriarchate formally accepted the Monastery of St. Irene Chrysovalantou in Astoria NY as a Sacred Patriarchal and Stavropegial Institution, as well as its founders Metr. Paisios (Loulourgas) of Tyana and Bp. Vikentios (Malamatenios) of Apameia (formerly of the Church of the Genuine Orthodox Christians of Greece).
- 1999 Retirement of Spyridon (Papageorge), Greek Archbishop of America, being replaced by Demetrios (Trakatellis); reception of dissident group from the Ben Lomond Crisis by the Jerusalem Patriarchate, including re-ordination of some of the excommunicated and/or deposed clergy.
- 2000 Glorification of St. Raphael of Brooklyn at St. Tikhon's Orthodox Monastery (South Canaan, Pennsylvania) by the OCA jointly with Antiochian hierarchs; reception of multiple former parishes of the Holy Order of MANS/Christ the Saviour Brotherhood into the Patriarchal Bulgarian diocese.
- 2001 Second meeting of most bishops associated with SCOBA; the 2001 data from Statistics Canada gives a total of 433,815 Orthodox in Canada.
- 2002 Retirement of Theodosius (Lazor) and election of Herman (Swaiko) as Metropolitan of the OCA at 13th All-American Council held in Orlando, Florida.
- 2003 The Antiochian Orthodox Christian Archdiocese of North America is granted "self-rule" (similar but not identical to autonomy) by the Church of Antioch, establishing 9 new dioceses in North America and promoting its auxiliary bishops to diocesan ones; after years of inactivity, refounding of OISM.
- 2004 Consecration in Damascus of 3 new diocesan bishops for the Antiochian Archdiocese, Thomas (Joseph) of Oakland, Mark (Maymon) of Toledo, and Alexander (Mufarrij) of Ottawa.
- 2005 Death of Archbishop Iakovos (Coucouzis); consecration of Alejo (Pacheco Vera) of Mexico City, auxiliary bishop of the OCA Exarchate of Mexico; OCA's New York diocese subsumed into its Diocese of Washington, creating the Diocese of Washington and New York, at 14th All-American Council held in Toronto, Ontario, Canada.
- 2006 4th All-Diaspora Council of the ROCOR votes to restore full communion with Moscow Patriarchate; four priests and one deacon who departed the Antiochian Archdiocese during the Ben Lomond Crisis return to Antioch; major financial scandal in the OCA; third meeting of most SCOBA bishops agrees to work together on canonical and pastoral questions.
- 2007 OISM holds first meeting at a ROCOR seminary, Holy Trinity Orthodox Seminary; ROCOR reconciles officially with the Patriarch of Moscow under the Act of Canonical Communion with the Moscow Patriarchate, with incorporation of the ROCOR as a semi-autonomous entity of the patriarchate.
- 2008 Jerusalem jurisdiction transferred to Greek Archdiocese, forming Vicariate for Palestinian-Jordanian Communities in the USA; Metr. Herman (Swaiko) retired by OCA amidst financial scandal; Jonah (Paffhausen) elected primate of OCA; 15th All-American Council held in Pittsburgh, PA.
- 2009 Church of Georgia names Metr. Dimitri (Shiolashvili) of Batumi and Lazeti as bishop for North America; the OCMC's Archbishop Anastasios and Archbishop Demetrios Mission and Training Centre is opened in St. Augustine, Florida, for the training of missionaries for global assignments, being the first permanent facility of the combined Orthodox churches in America; reciprocal visit of Abp. Demetios (Trakatellis) and a delegation from the Greek Archdiocese to Metropolitan Hilarion (Kapral) and hierarchs of the Russian Orthodox Church Outside Russia, marking the first visit of a Greek Orthodox Archbishop to ROCOR's headquarters in more than 40 years; Fourth Pre-Conciliar Pan-Orthodox Conference meets in Chambesy, Switzerland and mandates "Episcopal Assemblies" for various regions of the world, including North America; Metr. Jonah (Paffhausen) addressed the inaugural assembly of the newly founded Anglican Church in North America "seeking an ecumenical restoration"; an agreement was announced between St. Vladimir's Seminary and Nashotah House, an Anglican seminary, to guide ecumenical relationships and the new dialogue between the two churches; OCA Holy Synod reestablishes Diocese of Washington and Diocese of New York-New Jersey; Apostolic and Patriarchal Visit to the U.S. of Ecumenical Patr. Batholomew I (Archontonis), meeting with the Orthodox Primates of the USA; Patr. Bartholomew I officially opened the 8th Religion, Science and the Environment (RSE) Symposium, entitled "Restoring Balance: The Great Mississippi River," and is published in the Wall Street Journal in an op-ed piece entitled "Our Indivisible Environment;" Manhattan Declaration: A Call of Christian Conscience is issued, signed by more than 150 American religious leaders including Metr. Jonah (Paffhausen) and Bp. Basil (Essey) of Wichita.
- 2010 Consecration of Bp. Michael (Dahulich) of New York (OCA); formation of Episcopal Assembly of North and Central America; ROCOR marks its 90th anniversary; the Ministry of Education of the Hellenic Republic formally recognized St. Tikhon's Orthodox Theological Seminary (South Canaan, Pennsylvania) as an accredited institution of Higher Education, equal in standing to the schools of theology in the universities of Greece and the EU's member states; Toronto Orthodox Theological Academy (Toronto, Ontario) and Saint Paul Catholic Pontifical University in Ottawa sign cooperation agreement as twin institutions within the province of Ontario. (Note: Saint Paul University in Ottawa is the home of the "Metropolitan Andrey Sheptytsky Institute of Eastern Christian Studies", named after the primate of the Ukrainian Catholic Church, Andrey Sheptytsky (1865–1944). It specializes in Eastern Christian Studies, with special but not exclusive emphasis on the tradition of the Church of Kyiv.)
- 2011 Second gathering of the Episcopal Assembly of North and Central America, convened May 25–27 in Chicago.
- 2012. Metropolitan Jonah tendered his resignation as Primate of the Orthodox Church in America at the unanimous request of the Holy Synod of Bishops.

== Sources ==
This article incorporates text from Timeline of Eastern Orthodoxy in North America at OrthodoxWiki which is licensed under the CC-BY-SA and GFDL.

- Vuković, Sava (1998). History of the Serbian Orthodox Church in America and Canada 1891–1941. Kragujevac: Kalenić.
