= Archbishop of Italy =

Archbishop of Italy can refer to:

- The Catholic Archbishops in Italy
- Bishop of Rome, one of the titles of the Pope
- Orthodox Archdiocese of Italy
