= IOCC =

IOCC may refer to:

- Interception of Communications Commissioner
- International Orthodox Christian Charities
- Iron Ore Company of Canada
