= OISM =

OISM can refer to the following:

- Oregon Institute of Science and Medicine
- Orthodox Inter-Seminary Movement
