= Ligonier Meeting =

1994 North American Orthodox Christian conference

The Ligonier Meeting was a meeting of 28 or 29 Orthodox Christian hierarchs in North America, specifically those affiliated with SCOBA, held November 30 to December 2, 1994, at the Antiochian Village in Ligonier, Pennsylvania. The bishops met together (many for the first time), held multiple sessions and presentations, and issued two statements, specifically on evangelism and on the notion of American Orthodox Christians being a "diaspora".

It was not strictly a council or synod per se, but it had many of the characteristics of a synod, particularly the conciliarity or sobornost which results in the meeting of the Church's bishops together in collegiality, referring to itself as an "episcopal assembly." The conference was presided over by Archbishop Iakovos of America, primate of the Greek Orthodox Archdiocese of America and the SCOBA chairman.

== History ==
=== Preparation ===
The original idea for the meeting at Ligonier was generated in the Holy Synod of the Orthodox Church in America some years prior to the invitation by SCOBA, according to the Romanian Archbishop Nathaniel Popp of Detroit:

The proposal was decided that the Orthodox Church in America, the Autocephalous Church, should issue an invitation to all hierarchs in North America to gather together in fellowship in order to come to know one another, face to face. Included would be even those who were not represented on SCOBA, meaning, at that time, the large Ukrainian Church.

What transpired is a matter of historical facts and chance. Some of the hierarchs considered that the forthcoming Millennium Celebration of the Evangelization of Rus should take precedence over this local meeting, and thus, an invitation from the Orthodox Church in America was postponed. On another occasion, the Holy Synod resurrected the same idea but a particular hierarch, not a member of the Orthodox Church in America, requested that an agenda was first necessary and so, the meeting was postponed for lack of a more defined purpose beyond the hierarchs getting to know one another and have general discussion about common problems and needs.

Thus it came to be that, to its credit, the invitation came from the SCOBA which, through its efforts organized and brought about this meeting in Ligonier. Only hierarchs who had representation in SCOBA were invited, and thus the informal gathering envisioned by the Orthodox Church in America came to be a more formal meeting of those hierarchs who were in mutual "canonical" communion with each other. Thus, some of the hierarchs now represented in SCOBA were not then present for the meeting.

=== At Ligonier ===
In November 1994, the invited hierarchs assembled at the Antiochian Village in Ligonier, Pennsylvania, hosted by Metropolitan Phillip of the Antiochian Archdiocese and presided over by Archbishop Iakovos of America, primate at that time of the Greek Archdiocese and SCOBA chairman (by custom, the chairman of SCOBA is elected by its members, but the one elected is always the primate of the representative of the Church of Constantinople in America).

Five months before, Metropolitan Spyridon Papageorge of Italy gave a speech at the 32nd Biennial Clergy-Laity Conference of the Greek Archdiocese, in which he plainly stated that both he and the Ecumenical Patriarch, Bartholomew, wanted an end to "ethnic ghettoes" which divided Orthodoxy in America. He denounced ethnic insularity at the expense of "our spiritual identity," and that it was time to cut the "Gordian knot of nationalism." Spyridon was generally regarded at the time to be the natural successor to the aged Iakovos, and his bold words for unity seemed the perfect cue for what transpired at Ligonier (Michalopoulos and Ham, 180-181).

Though Iakovos officially presided over the event, he "graciously receded into the background as Ligonier was under the jurisdiction of Metropolitan Philip, who was thus the host and official prime mover behind the conference." Philip gave the address to the gathered bishops, and Archbishop Dmitri Royster of Dallas gave the official response. "By all accounts, unity and amity of purpose abounded. The assembled bishops came to an agreement and issued a statement declaring their intention of forming a united American Orthodox Church" (ibid., 181).

=== Aftermath ===
The documents which were issued by the conference did not include negative language regarding the old world patriarchates. Indeed, they were mentioned quite positively in the context of the origins of the immigrant churches on American soil. There was close attention to canonical protocol, and no declaration to form a separate religious denomination was attempted, nor was there a declaration of the formation of an autocephalous American Orthodox Church. The meeting can be quite fairly described as simply a gathering of Orthodox bishops in America, thinking and speaking together with one voice on the canonical problems facing their ministry in America. Michalopoulos and Ham continue:

Unfortunately, the Ligonier Statement was viewed by some of the patriarchates as a "power grab" by Iakovos, who heretofore had been accused sotto voce of cultivating a "cult of personality." Many feared that he was on the verge of having himself proclaimed as "Patriarch of America." Some of the Old World patriarchates were scared of losing their American dioceses simply for economic reasons.

One of the signatories, Metropolitan Christopher of the Serbian exarchate, openly admitted that the ultimate goal of the Ligonier conference was not only unification, but also autocephaly. The fact that this interview (as well as Christopher's comments) was conducted on videotape and was distributed to parishes all over North America showed there was no hidden agenda at Ligonier. Regardless, Ligonier disturbed not only the Old World patriarchates, but some priests and laymen in America as well. More than a few were perfectly happy with the status quo. (ibid., 181)

What is clear from the reports and documents of the conference, however, is that there was no agenda to force a submission of some American Orthodox to others. The senior hierarchs all had something to lose from unification, whether it was property, prestige, revenue, seminaries, orphanages, and so on. The focus was not on "pecking order," as The American Orthodox Church puts it, but on "the canonical irregularities that plagued American Orthodoxy" (ibid., 182).

In any event, if any of the "big three" hierarchs—Iakovos (GOA), Theodosius (OCA) or Philip (AOA)—had been elected as the American Orthodox primate, the reign would have been a short one. All three were old men (two have since retired). None of these three men could have been an "empire builder," but rather only a "transitional figure" (ibid., 182). There was no attempt to make such a move, however.

The American Orthodox Church characterizes the move for unity at Ligonier to have ended up a failure:

What began as a sincere plea for an end to disunity eventually accomplished exactly the opposite. Why did it fail? Clearly, the view that this was a power grab by Iakovos played some part. It is believed that one of the signatories of the Ligonier Statement, Bishop Vsevolod of the Ukrainian archdiocese, told Bartholomew that Iakovos was getting ready to have himself declared "Patriarch of America." Although the goal of unity had been openly declared as desirable in Spyridon's earlier address to the Greek archdiocese, the inflammatory reportage of the Ligonier Conference by this particular conferee may have caused Bartholomew to question the motives of its signatories. It is just as possible that other forces, which had no desire to see a united Orthodox witness in the United States, were at work behind the scenes. (ibid., 183)

The death-knell for the accomplishment of Ligonier seemed to sound in the subsequent removal of Iakovos from his see. It could be that Bartholomew "feared the loss of financial support from America," that he "feared the loss of American political clout in facing the Turks," or that it perhaps was "nothing more than a power struggle between two strong men" (ibid., 184). No matter the reasoning, in 1997, the patriarch sent a delegation from the Holy Synod of the Church of Constantinople which forced Iakovos to resign after a nearly 40-year tenure. "Despite missteps along the way, to the fullest extent possible, Iakovos bridged ethnic divisions and forged an Orthodox consensus. He almost succeeded in creating the American Orthodox Church" (ibid., 184).

Not all commentators view Ligonier as a failure, however. Certainly, many of the hierarchs who met one another now know something of their brothers in the episcopacy, and that cannot be undone. Additionally, the very idea of what happened at Ligonier continues on in the consciousness of American Orthodoxy. It may eventually be that Ligonier will be seen not as a failure of unity, but one step along the way toward its pursuit. Archbishop Nathaniel (Popp) of Detroit has this to say:

Ligonier nailed open the doors of indifference and urged us to go through the wide gates of cooperation, mutual support and service to our fellow citizens, sharing the faith with others and spiritually expanding our own lives in evangelical ministry to all God's people.

Let us now hear about the fruits which bear witness to the blessings generated by Ligonier in the Church, and let us be open to be inspired to expand our witness to the unity of the faith and our fellowship in the Holy Spirit.

== Documents ==
Two statement documents were issued at Ligonier, one on the Orthodox Church in North America and one on Missions and Evangelism. Their content may generally be characterized as a rejection of the notion that Orthodox Christianity in America constitutes a diaspora, that the ongoing uncanonical disunity of American Orthodoxy must come to an end. Additionally, the statement on evangelism makes it clear that American Orthodox bishops regard the purpose of the Church in America as a missionary one.

- Statement on the Church in North America
- Statement on Mission and Evangelism

== Participating hierarchs ==
The following hierarchs signed the documents of the Ligonier Meeting, with one exception noted. The list reflects the titles of these bishops at the time. Whether there were twenty-eight or twenty-nine bishops actually present, there are twenty-eight pictured in the group photograph taken at the meeting, and there are twenty-eight different signatures on the documents.

- Ecumenical Patriarchate of Constantinople:
  - Greek Orthodox Archdiocese of America:
    - Archbishop Iakovos Coucouzis
    - Metropolitan Silas Koskinas of New Jersey
    - Bishop Iakovos Krinis of Chicago
    - Bishop Methodios Tournas of Boston
    - Bishop Philip Koutoufas of Atlanta
    - Bishop Maximos Aghiorgoussis of Pittsburgh
    - Chorbishop Alexios Panagiotopoulos of Astoria
    - Bishop Anthimos Draconakis of Olympos
    - Bishop Philotheos Karamitsos of Meloa
  - Ukrainian Orthodox Church in the USA:
    - Archbishop Vsevolod Maydansky of Scopelos
  - American Carpatho-Russian Orthodox Diocese:
    - Bishop Nicholas Smisko of Amissos
- Orthodox Church in America:
  - Metropolitan Theodosius Lazor of Washington
  - Archbishop Dmitri Royster of Dallas and the South
  - Archbishop Kyrill Yonchev of Pittsburgh and Western Pennsylvania
  - Archbishop Peter L'Huillier of New York and New Jersey
  - Archbishop Herman Swaiko of Philadelphia and Eastern Pennsylvania
  - Bishop Nathaniel Popp of the Romanian Orthodox Episcopate of America
  - Bishop Tikhon Fitzgerald of San Francisco and the West
  - Bishop Seraphim Storheim of Ottawa and Canada
  - Bishop Mark Forsberg of Boston and New England
- Greek Orthodox Church of Antioch:
  - Metropolitan Philip Saliba of York and All North America
  - Bishop Antoun Khouri of Selefkia
  - Bishop Basil Essey of Enfeh al-Koura
- Bulgarian Orthodox Church:
  - Metropolitan Joseph Bosakov of America, Canada and Australia
- Romanian Orthodox Church:
  - Archbishop Victorin Ursache of America and Canada
- Serbian Orthodox Church:
  - Metropolitan Christopher Kovacevich of Midwestern America
  - Metropolitan Irinej Kovačević of New Gracanica
  - Bishop Mitrofan Kodić of Eastern America (Note: withheld signature from the statement on the Church in North America)

== Bishops' comments ==
In the November 2004 issue of Word Magazine (the Antiochian Archdiocese's official publication), the comments of SCOBA bishops (some of whom were present and others not) on the 10th anniversary of the Ligonier meeting were published, including the following:

=== Primates ===
Metropolitan Herman Swaiko of Washington, primate of the OCA

I think of Ligonier as a moment in the history of Orthodoxy in North America when a love for the missionary mandate of the Gospel transcended ethnic and cultural barriers and concerns. Ligonier provided a venue where Orthodox bishops offered words and visions of ecclesial unity. Ten years ago, the prophetic spirit of Ligonier stood opposed to jurisdictional pluralism even when other hierarchs, here and abroad, sought to justify the uncanonical status quo. Ten years ago, the bishops of Ligonier expressed a oneness of mind which exposed the falsehood that jurisdictional pluralism does not impede Eucharistic unity when, in fact, the presence of two or more bishops in one city undermines the very reality of ecclesial and, therefore, Eucharistic unity. Over the last ten years, the national and international stages have drastically changed. People across North America and the world are divided by religion, race, politics and economics. A divided world needs the unifying voice of Christ. But the voice of Christ, if it is to properly convey its healing power, demands the unity of His Church here and across the globe. The work begun ten years ago must continue and be brought to fruition. As long as there are those who hear and do the word of the Lord in North America, the message of Ligonier will not be silenced.

Metropolitan Philip Saliba of New York, primate of the Antiochian Archdiocese

November 30 to December 2, 1994 was the brightest moment in the history of Orthodoxy in North America. For the first time, twenty-nine Orthodox bishops from the United States and Canada gathered at the Antiochian Village to pray together, discuss Orthodox problems together and formulate a common vision for the future. This brotherly and well-meaning meeting caused an unexpected earthquake in some of the ancient Orthodox Patriarchates. Let us hope that the spirit of Ligonier will be born again and our dream for a united Orthodoxy in America will never fade away.

Metropolitan Nicholas Smisko of Amissos, bishop of the American Carpatho-Russian Orthodox Diocese:

America needs Orthodoxy, without Orthodoxy becoming Americanized. Orthodoxy must continue to develop in spirituality and maturity, growing gradually and appropriately toward a developed polity. I am concerned that aggressive attempts toward premature separation from the mother churches of the old lands will result in disarray and schism. Instead, we are called by the Lord to continue in humble growth and obedience to our organic link with the Patriarchates. We hope and pray for the direction of the Holy Spirit in the future life of our church.

Metropolitan Joseph, Bulgarian Eastern Orthodox Diocese of the USA, Canada and Australia:

What we—the canonical Orthodox bishops—had done 10 years ago was good. But there are no results so far. It is only a good desire. That means—such is God's will. Without Him we can do nothing.

Therefore, I beseeched the Lord to teach me His statutes. After my prayer as usual I opened my Bible with closed eyes and put my finger on the right place. For the first time I opened Revelation 1:3—"Blessed is he that readeth, and they that hear the words of this prophecy, and keep those things which are written therein: for the time is at hand." I asked the Lord: "O Lord! What about until then?" And again I opened the Bible, that time on 1 Timothy 1:15—"This is a faithful saying, and worthy of all acceptance, that Christ Jesus came into the world to save sinners; of whom I am chief." And for the third time I tempted the Lord, saying: "O Lord! I am not an Abraham nor a Jew, I'm a sinner, but involve me to understand Your Will." And then I opened the Book of Sirah—Joshua 24:29-30, where I read in the new American Translation: "Said to myself, I will water my plants, my flower bed I will drench; and suddenly this rivulet of mine became a river, then this stream of mine, a sea. Thus do I send my teaching forth shining like a dawn, to become known afar off. Thus do I pour out instruction like prophecy and bestow it on generations to come."

And now it is clear for me, that this prophecy should be fulfilled, but not during my life. I think that all of us, Orthodox bishops, who were born and came to America from the old countries, like me, and now control the jurisdictional eparchies, must die. The Holy Orthodox Church needs new generations of Americans to come after us, who shall fulfill the Lord's instructions and prophecy. Because now, as Fr. Vladimir Berzonsky writes: "Spiritually we are still drinking mother's milk, not yet ready for loftier and deeper experiences of the life reaching out to us from Christ and present through the Holy Spirit within our hearts."

=== Other bishops ===
Archbishop Kyrill Yonchev of Pittsburgh, OCA:

The meeting in Ligonier of Orthodox hierarchs in North America in November 1994 was extremely encouraging and positive in its decision-making. It concluded that there was need for canonical unity in America among the Orthodox jurisdictions. The gathering offered great hope for the unity of Orthodoxy in America. My vision for the future remains the same—One United Canonical Church in the Americas.

Metropolitan Maximos (Aghiorgoussis) of Pittsburgh, Greek Archdiocese:

Congratulations on the November, 2004 The WORD issue, commemorating the 10th Anniversary of the Ligonier meeting of our Orthodox North American Bishops. Unfortunately, things have not drastically changed since that time. We still hope and pray for complete and visible unity in the Orthodox Diaspora of North America. Let us hope that, as promised to us in Washington, D.C., fourteen years ago, the ranking Orthodox jurisdiction, the Ecumenical Patriarchate, will assume a leadership role in order for this to happen, hopefully during our lifetime.

Archbishop Peter L'Huillier of New York, OCA:

The Ligonier meeting of the Orthodox bishops in North America was a milestone in the history of Orthodoxy in America. The vision of Orthodoxy that was seen at that meeting is still relevant today, but has yet to be realized. Orthodox jurisdictional unity in North America must be our continued vision; any deviation from this is a contradiction to the order and canons of the Orthodox Church. Let us fervently pray that the Holy Spirit will guide us in making this vision a reality.

Bishop Nikolai Soraich of Sitka, OCA:

The Conference at Ligonier was an exciting moment for many of us who were priests serving the faithful at that time. All who read of the meeting and of its call to unity were inspired with high hopes.

Ten years later, we still note that there is no place in Holy Orthodoxy for the present case of multi-jurisdictionalism in North America and across the globe, as this only impedes the Church's evangelizing efforts. This was reflected in the Mission and Evangelism Statement issued at Ligonier: "We commit ourselves to avoiding the creation of parallel and competitive Orthodox parishes, missions, and mission programs... and to move forward towards a concerted, formal, and united mission program in order to make a real impact on North America through Orthodox mission and evangelism."

Our prayer and efforts should be for one Holy Orthodox Church in North America, a goal that can only be accomplished in the spirit of cooperation and not division.

Archbishop Nathaniel Popp of Detroit, OCA:

Orthodox Christians working out their salvation in Canada and the United States of America must separately be united into two local Autocephalous Churches, each pastored by hierarchs synergetically working in two unique Holy Synods, each one headed by its own Patriarch. The long-term goal of one hierarch shepherding one metropolis will, in time, manifest itself through the will of the Holy Spirit inspiring the entire Church. Inasmuch as each "jurisdiction" serves both an ethnic and indigenous flock, it should continue its ministry uninterrupted. Present imperfect "Eucharistic unity" will be perfected because of administrative unity. Temporarily, administrative unity means each jurisdiction will keep its own administrative structures which, nonetheless, are brought into a national unity through representation by each hierarch in his national, Canadian or American, Holy Synod. Each Autocephalous Church must create a single Constitution and By-laws/Statutes to best serve the needs of the native-born and the immigrant. The unity of the hierarchs, in Synodia, would manifest itself in unity of purpose of internal and external evangelization as outlined ten years ago in the two documents born of the Ligonier meeting. This to be achieved through the movement of the Holy Spirit empowering these Orthodox Christians through fasting, prayer and almsgiving to act creatively.

Bishop Ilia of Philomelion, Albanian Diocese:

The time has come for Orthodoxy in America to move beyond simple affirmation of historical, canonical order. It is time to encourage and develop cooperation among churches, which will prove to be a genuine blueprint for greater unity on all fronts. Specific principles need to be articulated and accepted by all jurisdictions in a common commitment to work in consort. Programs of pan-Orthodox endeavor, at the grass roots, should be initiated and supported so that the faithful experience a oneness in purpose and action. Everything is achievable through mutual respect and sensitivity flowing from faith and love in Christ.

Bishop Antoun Khouri of Miami, Antiochian Archdiocese:

I honestly thought after Ligonier that we were beginning a new era of cooperation and Orthodox unity on this continent. For the first time since the early years of our presence in the Americas, it seemed there was a common vision, or at least a common goal of working together, not just for the sake of working together, but toward a canonically proper end of a unified Church. For me, the chance to sit down with brother bishops, many of whom I had never met, was a great and awesome experience. What made this experience great and awesome, besides just getting together, was that there was a purpose. Often we had gotten together in the past, but just for social purposes or anniversaries, celebrations, etc. This time it was for the good of the Church. Unfortunately, what happened in the aftermath of Ligonier left us further apart and more disunited than we were in the years that led up to that historic gathering.

Bishop Basil (Essey) of Wichita, Antiochian Archdiocese:

In 1994 I was a relatively new and young bishop when the now famous Conference of Bishops was convened at the Antiochian Village, and so together with another young bishop, His Grace Seraphim of Ottawa and Canada, I was appointed to the Conference's secretariat. Ligonier '94 was without doubt one of the brightest moments—if not THE brightest moment—in the history of Holy Orthodoxy in the New World. Dozens of bishops met and prayed and deliberated on that Pennsylvania mountain-top, while hundreds of thousands of our young people across the continent prayed and fasted that we might accomplish a good for Holy Orthodoxy. And, by God's grace, a great good was indeed accomplished! The common hope and vision expressed by my brother bishops during those several days and reflected in the two historic documents produced by the Conference caused a refreshing and invigorating breeze to blow across this continent, opening the doors of our Orthodox congregations with hope and joyful anticipation. But sadly and all too quickly, dark storm clouds blew in from the East, causing those doors to be slammed shut once more. Some of those doors were and remained locked to this very day, while others stand ajar, awaiting another refreshing and invigorating breeze to open them once again. May that breeze come quickly!

Bishop Joseph Al-Zehlaoui of Los Angeles, Antiochian Archdiocese:

The Orthodox Church offers the spiritual healing so many need as they realize the emptiness of secularism and materialism. The task for us in the Church is to offer true spirituality rather than the empty entertainment that passes for Christianity in the West. We must get beyond duels over the Scripture with fundamentalists and revisionists, and instead challenge people with the evidence we have for the true healing and theosis found only in the Orthodox Church.

=== Other comments ===
Expanding on his remarks published in the November 2004 Word Magazine, Bishop Nikolai (Soraich) of Sitka (OCA) had this to say in an open letter in the Winter 2005 issue of his diocesan publication, The North Star (pp. 3–4):

It says in the Akathist that St. Herman envisioned "an Episcopal throne in this land." (Ikos 11) It doesn't say anything about multiple thrones, but one—an autocephalous Church in this land—one that came to be in 1970 [i.e., the OCA]. I look back on those seminary years and years later when there was much hope for a united church in America. There were pan-Orthodox celebrations; Sunday of Orthodoxy gatherings were major events and the spirit of the faithful and clergy was elevated in this gathering of the Church. Now we look back just ten years later and find the gathering of bishops at Ligonier is hailed as the greatest event of American Orthodoxy! I wonder how the canonization of America's first saint is relegated to some lesser place in the life of Orthodoxy in America. Even Ligonier was hopeful to those of us who were serving the churches in multiple jurisdictions. Soon we were disappointed when hierarchs removed their names from the documents that were prepared; one on evangelism and the other on administrative unity. Are we willing to truly pray the Akathist and submit ourselves to the vision of America's most wondrous saint in realizing one Church? We don't need another Ligonier, we need a gathering in Kodiak at the relics of America's first Saint, a prayerful walk on Spruce Island and a willingness to accept the call of Jesus Christ for the sake of Orthodoxy—not disunited, but united!

A reply to his letter was published in February 2005 on the Orthodoxy Today website.

== See also ==
- Standing Conference of the Canonical Orthodox Bishops in the Americas

== Sources ==
- Derived with permission from "Ligonier meeting" at OrthodoxWiki.
- The American Orthodox Church: A History of Its Beginnings, by George C. Michalopulos and Herb Ham (ISBN 1-928653-14-6), pp. 179–184
- The Vision of Ligonier: Inter-Orthodox Cooperation or Ligonier: The Vision and the Reality, by Archbishop Nathaniel (Popp) of Detroit
- Word Magazine, November 2004
