= Antoun Khouri =

Bishop of the Antiochian Orthodox Christian Archdiocese of North America

His Grace, the Right Reverend Antoun
- Bishop of Miami and the Southeast
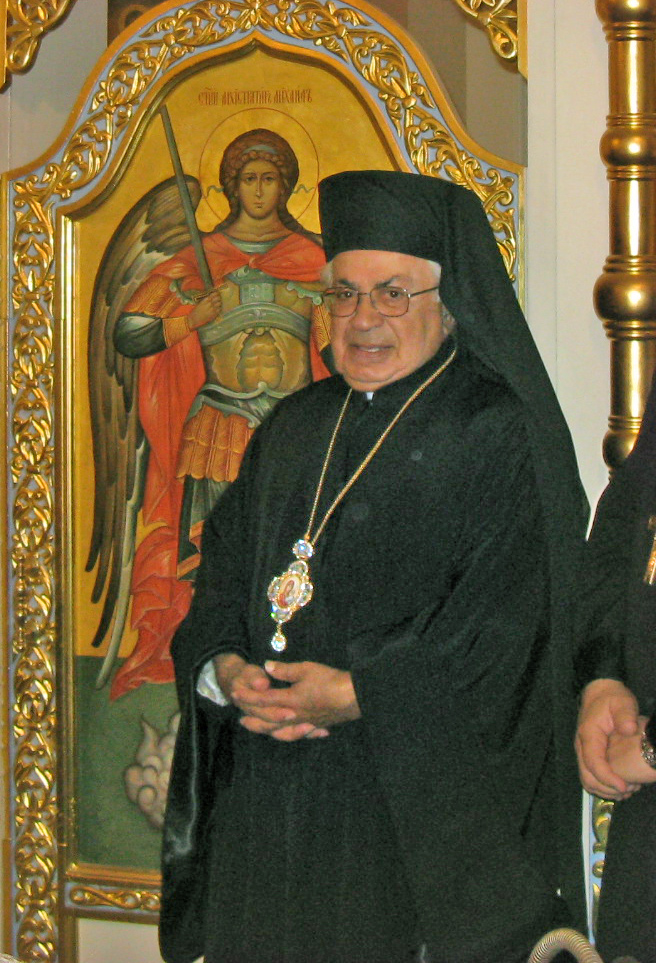
- Church: Greek Orthodox Church of Antioch
- Archdiocese: Antiochian Orthodox Christian Archdiocese of North America
- Diocese: Miami and the Southeast
- Successor: Nicholas (Ozone)

Personal details
- Born: Antoun issa Khouri; January 17, 1931 Damascus
- Died: October 2, 2017 (aged 86)
- Buried: Antiochian Village
- Denomination: Eastern Orthodox

Antoun (Khouri) of Miami and the Southeast was a diocesan bishop of the Antiochian Orthodox Christian Archdiocese of North America.

== Life ==
=== Early years ===
Antoun, born Antoun issa Khouri (January 17, 1931, in Damascus, Syria – October 2, 2017) was the fourth of six children born to the late Wedad Elias Abraxia and Yssa Khouri. After completing his elementary education at the Orthodox School in Meedan, Syria, he entered the Minor Seminary at Balamand Monastery, near Tripoli, Lebanon, at the age of fourteen, where he met his lifelong friend, the future Metropolitan Philip Saliba. At the Balamand Seminary he completed his junior and senior high school studies and then went on to receive his diploma in theology from the Balamand Theological Academy of Saint John of Damascus.

On October 28, 1951, he was ordained to the diaconate by Alexander III, the Greek Orthodox Patriarch of Antioch and All the East, at the Patriarchal Cathedral of the Dormition of the Theotokos in Damascus. While a deacon at the cathedral, he was instructor, then Dean of the Saint John of Damascus School. While in Damascus, he undertook undergraduate studies at the Assiyat Orthodox College from which he was graduated in 1957. In the same year he was assigned to the Antiochian Orthodox Archdiocese of Brazil, where he served at the Metropolitan Cathedral of Saint Paul and as secretary to Metropolitan Ignatius Forzley of São Paulo.

=== Graduate education and priesthood ===
In 1959 Antoun arrived in United States for graduate theological studies at St. Vladimir's Orthodox Theological Seminary near New York City, from which he graduated in 1962, having been ordained to the priesthood on May 29, 1960, by Metropolitan Antony Bashir, the Archbishop of New York and all North America. On August 3, 1969, he was elevated to the dignity of Archimandrite by Metropolitan Philip Saliba. As a priest he served the following pastorates: St. George Church in Philadelphia, Pennsylvania; St. George Church in Toronto, Ontario; St. George Church in Allentown, Pennsylvania and St. Nicholas Cathedral in Brooklyn, New York. From 1969 to 1977, he worked from the Archdiocesan chancery in Englewood, New Jersey, as personal aide to Metropolitan Philip.

=== Episcopacy ===
The General Assembly of the Archdiocese of North America, consisting of clergy and lay delegates from parishes throughout the United States and Canada, nominated Archimandrite Antoun for the office of auxiliary bishop to the Metropolitan on August 1, 1981, and the Holy Synod of the Patriarchate of Antioch and All the East elected him to that office at a session in Damascus, Syria, on November 4, 1982, as titular bishop of Selefkia. He was consecrated to the episcopacy on January 9, 1983, at St. Nicholas Cathedral in Brooklyn, New York, by Metropolitan Philip Saliba of North America; Archbishop Michael Shaheen of Toledo, the Auxiliary of the Archdiocese of North America; Archbishop Elias Saliba, the superior of the Patriarchal Monastery of St. George (Tel-Kalakh, Syria); Bishop Paul Bandaly, the Patriarchal Vicar (now Metropolitan of Akkar, Lebanon); and Bishop Antonio Chedraoui, the Patriarchal Legate for the Diocese of Mexico and Central America.

By a decision of the Holy Synod of the Patriarchate dated October 9, 2003, he became a diocesan bishop bearing the title of Bishop of Miami and the Southeast. Antoun maintains his office and residence at the Archdiocesan Chancery in Englewood, New Jersey, although he has a secondary residence in Florida

== Death ==
Bishop Antoun died on October 2, 2017. Funeral services were held on Tuesday evening, October 10 and Wednesday morning, October 11 at Saint George Cathedral in Coral Gables, Florida. The Burial took place on Thursday, October 12 at the Antiochian Village in Bolivar, Pennsylvania.

Preceded by see created	Bishop of Miami (Antiochian); 2003 – 2017	Succeeded by Nicholas (Ozone)
