= Gennadios (Zervos) =

Metropolita Gennadios Zervos
- Archbishop of Italy and Malta
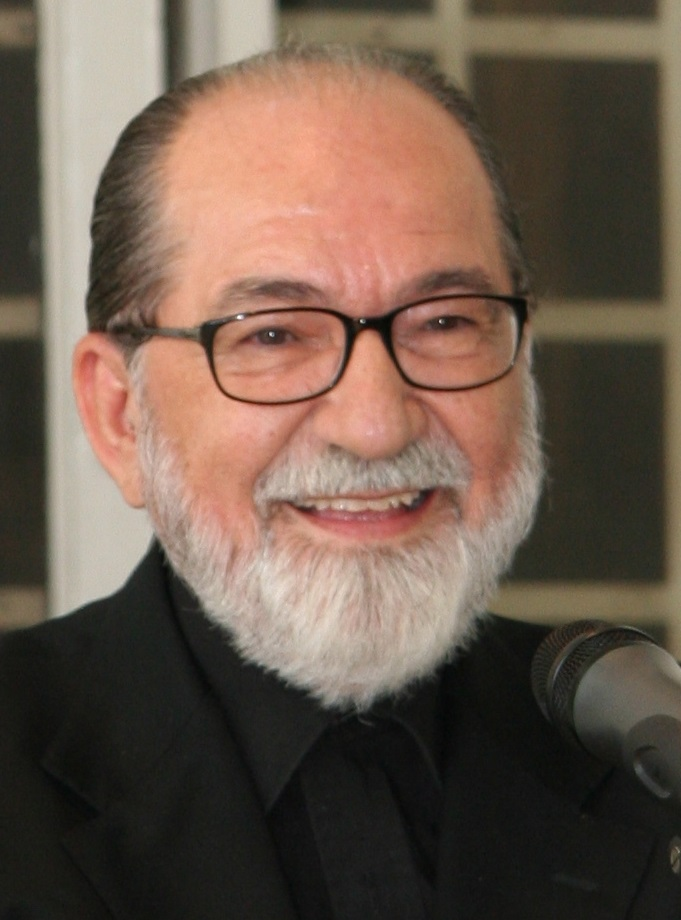
- Church: Greek Orthodox Church
- Archdiocese: Italy and Malta
- Appointed: 26 August 1996
- Installed: 1996
- Predecessor: Archbishop Spyridon of America
- Previous post: Bishop of Krateia (1970-1996)

Orders
- Ordination: 28 April 1963
- Consecration: 1979

Personal details
- Born: 8 July 1937 Kremasti, Rhodes, Kingdom of Italy
- Died: 16 October 2020 (aged 83) Venice

Metropolitan Gennadios (Italian: Gennadios Zervós, pronounced [dʒenˈnaːdjoz dzerˈvɔs]; secular name Tsampikos Zervos, Greek: Τσαμπίκος Ζερβός; 8 July 1937, Rhodes – 16 October 2020, Venice) was the metropolitan bishop of the Greek Orthodox Archdiocese of Italy, a diocese of the Ecumenical Patriarchate of Constantinople covering Italy, Malta, and San Marino.

== Biography ==
Born in the Italian Dodecanese, Zervos was ordained a deacon on April 16, 1960, taking the name of Gennadios, and a priest on April 28, 1963. He carried out a long pastoral service in Italy, as bishop of Krateia with his seat in Naples from November 26, 1970, and was lecturer at various Italian universities: for this he received the medal of Commander of the Italian Republic. For a long time he was the representative of the Patriarch of Constantinople in Italy. He was Metropolitan of the Greek Orthodox Archdiocese of Italy and Malta from 26 August 1996. First Orthodox bishop in Italy since the Great Schism of 1054, on 26 November 1970 he was unanimously elected on the proposal of Patriarch Athenagoras.
