= Archbishop Iakovos of America =

Greek Orthodox Archbishop (1911–2005)

His Eminence Iakovos
- Archbishop of North and South America
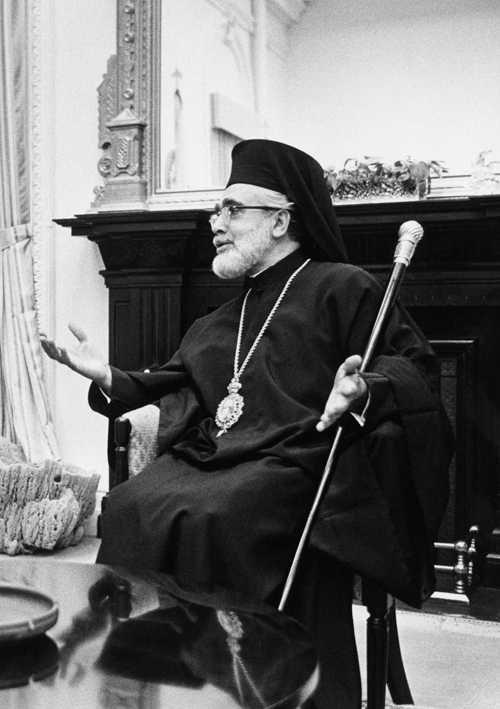
- See: New York, New York, US
- Installed: April 1, 1959
- Term ended: July 29, 1996
- Predecessor: Michael
- Successor: Spyridon

Personal details
- Born: Demetrios Koukouzes; July 29, 1911 Agios Theodoros, Imbros, Ottoman Empire (now Turkey)
- Died: April 10, 2005 (aged 93) Stamford, Connecticut, US
- Buried: Brookline, Massachusetts, US
- Parents: Athanasios and Maria Koukouzes
- Education: Theological School of Halki

Archbishop Iakovos of North and South America (Greek: Ιάκωβος; born Demetrios Koukouzis (Δημήτριος Κουκούζης); July 29, 1911 – April 10, 2005) was the primate of the Greek Orthodox Archdiocese of North and South America (now the Greek Orthodox Archdiocese of America) from 1959 until his resignation in 1996.

== Biography ==
Born on the village of Agios Theodoros on the island of Imbros, Ottoman Empire (now Turkey) on July 29, 1911, to Maria and Athanasios Koukouzis, he had two sisters Virginia and Chrysanthi and a brother Panagiotis. He enrolled at age 15 in the Ecumenical Patriarchal Theological School of Halki. After graduating with high honors, Demetrios Koukouzis was ordained deacon in 1934, taking the ecclesiastical name Iakovos. Five years after his ordination, Deacon Iakovos received an invitation to serve as Archdeacon to the late Archbishop Athenagoras, the Primate of North and South America, who later (1949–72) became Ecumenical Patriarch of Constantinople.

Ordained a priest in 1940 in Lowell, Massachusetts, US, he served at St. George Church, Hartford, Connecticut, while teaching and serving as assistant dean of the Holy Cross Greek Orthodox Theological School, then in Pomfret, Connecticut. In 1941, he was named Preacher at Archdiocesan Cathedral of the Holy Trinity in New York City and in the summer of 1942 served as temporary Dean of St. Nicholas Church in St. Louis, Missouri. He was appointed Dean of the Annunciation Greek Orthodox Cathedral in Boston in 1942 and remained there until 1954. In 1945, he earned a Master of Sacred Theology Degree from Harvard University.

In 1954, he was ordained Bishop of Miletus, by his spiritual father and mentor, Ecumenical Patriarch Athenagoras, for whom he served four years as personal representative of the Patriarchate to the World Council of Churches in Geneva. On February 14, 1959, the Holy Synod of the Ecumenical Patriarchate elected Iakovos as successor to Archbishop Michael, who died on July 15, 1958, as primate of the Greek Orthodox Archdiocese of America. He was enthroned on April 1, 1959, at Holy Trinity Cathedral, assuming responsibility for what has grown to over 500 parishes in the United States.

In addition to his duties as primate, Archbishop Iakovos was Exarch of the Ecumenical Patriarchate of Constantinople; president of the board of education of the Greek Orthodox Archdiocese of North and South America; founder and chairman of the Standing Conference of the Canonical Orthodox Bishops in the Americas (SCOBA); chairman of the Orthodox-Roman Catholic Consultation in the U.S., and of the Bishops' Committee for Ecumenical and Interreligious Affairs; honorary board of the Advisory Council on Religious Rights in Eastern Europe and the Soviet Union, and of the United States Senate Committee on Foreign Relations.

== Civil rights movement ==
A supporter of civil rights, Archbishop Iakovos was one of the few prominent non-African-American clergymen—and the only Church leader—who walked with Martin Luther King Jr. and others during the second 1965 march in Selma, Alabama. A picture with Archbishop Iakovos to the right of Martin Luther King Jr. holding a wreath for Rev. James Reeb, who was murdered in one of the first Selma marches, was featured on the cover of Life magazine on March 26, 1965.

Iakovos was motivated by his personal experience of being treated as a person without rights while growing up as a Greek in Turkey. He was born on the island of Imbros, at a time when "Turkish oppression was asserted in every aspect of the land". In an interview, he mentioned "that his participation was due to his need to take revenge for being treated as a slave, since he was born as a Greek in Turkey, where he and his community did not have any rights".

According to Grammenos "when Rev. Dr. Martin Luther King Jr. marched from the Brown Chapel of the African Methodist Episcopal Church to the Dallas County Courthouse in Selma, Alabama, on March 15, 1965, Archbishop Iakovos, leader of the Greek Orthodox Archdiocese of North and South America, was among the few white men who accompanied him. Iakovos accepted Dr. King's invitation demonstrating his commitment to freedom and civil rights as key principles of the American life. Iakovos stated that the Greek Orthodox Archdiocese could no longer remain a 'spectator and listener', and it must labor and struggle to develop its spiritual life. In the end, his firm support of Dr. King's initiative helped bring to fruition the passage of voting rights legislation, advancing equality among his communicants."

== Ecclesiastic relationships and death ==
Iakovos met Pope John XXIII in 1959, the first Greek Orthodox archbishop to meet with a Catholic pope in 350 years.

He spent nine years on the World Council of Churches and met with every U.S. president from Dwight D. Eisenhower to Bill Clinton. Jimmy Carter awarded him the Presidential Medal of Freedom in 1980.

Iakovos came into conflict with the Ecumenical Patriarch Bartholomew I after he supported a move by 29 bishops towards the administrative unification of Eastern Orthodox churches in America at the Ligonier Meeting. It is widely believed that this clash forced him to resign in 1996.

Archbishop Iakovos, died on April 10, 2005, at Stamford Hospital, Connecticut, from a pulmonary ailment. He was buried on April 15 in the grounds of the Holy Cross Greek Orthodox School of Theology in Brookline, Massachusetts.

== Titles ==
Styles of Archbishop Iakovos
- Reference style: His Eminence
- Spoken style: Your Eminence

Archbishop Iakovos was the last Primate of the Greek Orthodox Archdiocese of America who held the title of Archbishop of North and South America; after him the Archbishop's title became "Archbishop of America". Officially, his title was His Eminence, Iakovos, Archbishop of North and South America, Exarch of the Lands between the Atlantic and Pacific Ocean (Greek: Η Αυτού Σεβασμιότης ο Αρχιεπίσκοπος Βορείου και Νοτίου Αμερικής, Υπέρτιμος και Έξαρχος Ωκεανών Ατλαντικού τε και Ειρηνικού Ιάκωβος).

== Awards and honors ==
- Humanitarian Award IOCC (1995), International Orthodox Christian Charities, Chicago, Illinois
- Antiochian Gold Medal of Merit (1995), Antiochian Orthodox Christian Archdiocese of North America
- Grand Cross of Cyprus (1995), President of Cyprus Glafkos Klerides, New York, New York
- Kolokotronis Award (1995), Panarcadian Federation of America, New York, New York
- Great Cross of St. Sava (1992), Serbian Patriarch Pavle, New York, New York
- Freedom Award (1992), Pancyprian Association of America, New York, New York
- Gold Medal (1991), Federation of Hellenic Societies of New York, New York, New York
- Grand Cross of Robert Schuman (1991), Athens, Greece
- Gold Medal of the City of Thessaloniki (1990), Thessaloniki, Greece
- Gold Medal of the City of Athens (1989), Mayor of Athens Miltiadis Evert, Athens, Greece
- Grand Cross of Makarios III (1989), President of Cyprus George Vasiliou, New York, New York
- Lambeth Cross (1988), Archbishop of Canterbury Robert Runcie, London, England
- Homeric Award (1988), Chian Federation, New York, New York
- Socratic Award (1988), Order of AHEPA, Washington, D.C.
- John LaFarge Memorial Award for Interracial Justice (1987), New York, New York
- Ellis Island Medal of Honor (1986), Ellis Island, New York
- Dr. George C. Cotzias Humanitarian Award (1986), New York, New York
- Liberty Award (1986), Mayor of New York City Edward Koch, New York, New York
- Humanitarian Award (1985), McBurney School, New York, New York
- AXIOS Man of the Year (1985), Los Angeles, California
- Grand Cross of Honor (1984), President of Greece Constantine Karamanlis, Athens, Greece
- Gold Medal (1984), Academy of Athens, Athens, Greece
- The Compostela Award (1984), Cathedral of St. John, New York, New York
- Man of the Year Alpha-Omega Award (1984), Boston, Massachusetts
- Silver World Award (1984), Boy Scouts of America
- Humanitarian Award (1983), Hellenic Medical Society, New York, New York
- Cyprus Children's Fund (1983)
- Great Cross of the Holy Sepulchre (1982), Patriarch Diodoros of Jerusalem
- Man of the Year (1982), St. Paul's Society, New York, New York
- Clergyman of the Year (1981), Society for the Family of Man (New York City Council of Churches)
- Inaugural Award (1981), New York University, New York, New York
- Presidential Medal of Freedom (1980), President of the United States Jimmy Carter, Washington, D.C.
- Alumni Citation (1974), Hellenic College/Holy Cross Greek Orthodox School of Theology, Boston, Massachusetts
- Sam Levenson Memorial Award (1972), Jewish Heritage Week
- Man of Conscience Award (1971), The Appeal of Conscience Foundation
- Clergyman of the Year (1971), Society for the Family of Man (New York City Council of Churches)
- Distinguished American in Volunteer Service (1970), the White House, Washington, D.C.
- Clergyman of the Year (1970), Religious Heritage of America
- Religious Leader Award (1969), National Conference of Christians and Jews
- Gold Medal of Athens (1968), Mayor of Athens, Demetrios Ritsios, Athens, Greece
- Gold Medal for Courageous Leadership (1966), National Conference of Christians and Jews, New York, New York
- Great Cross of the Holy Sepulchre (1961), Patriarch Benedict of Jerusalem

== Photo gallery ==
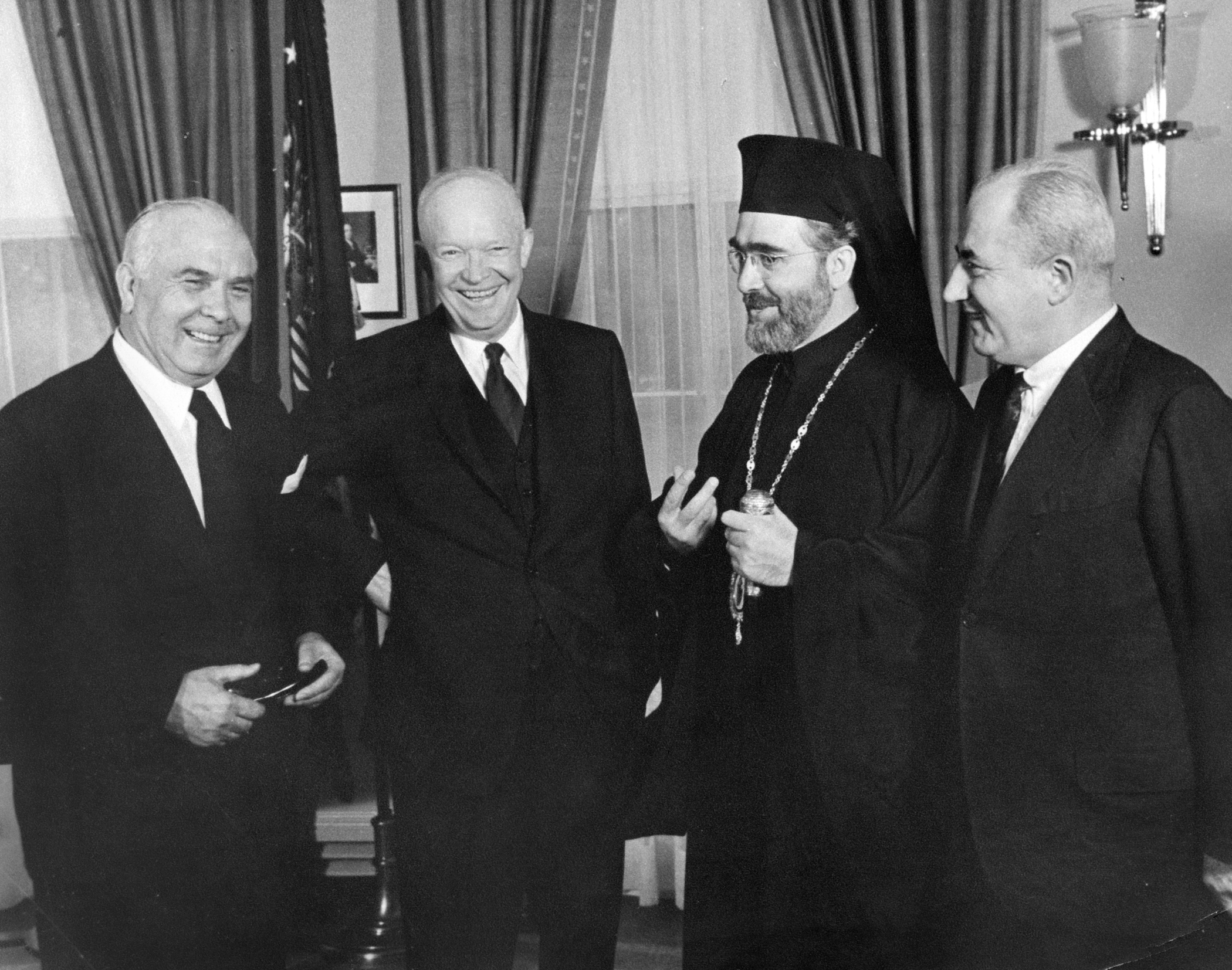
Archbishop Iakovos and President Eisenhower

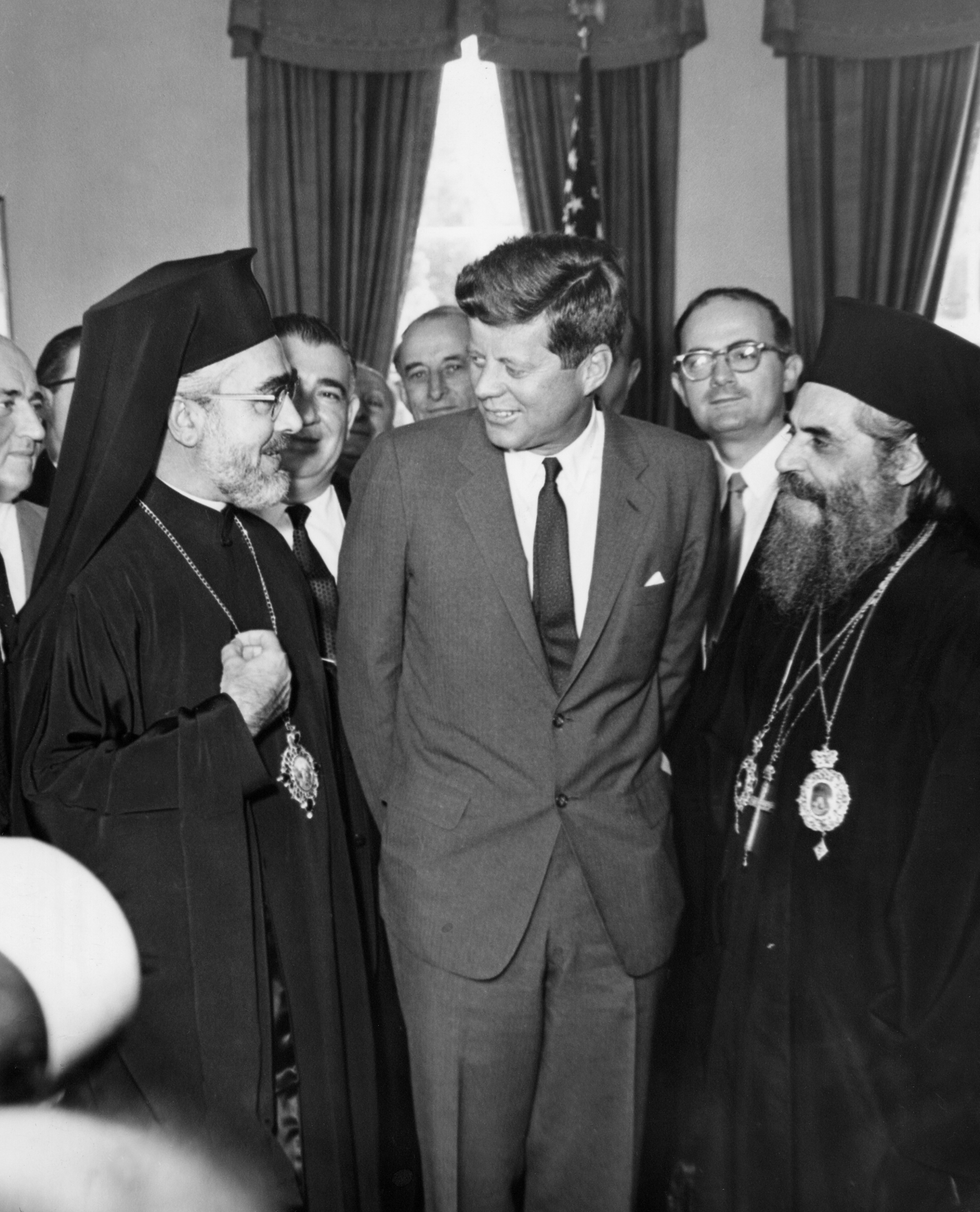
Archbishop Iakovos, Patriarch Benedict of Jerusalem and President Kennedy

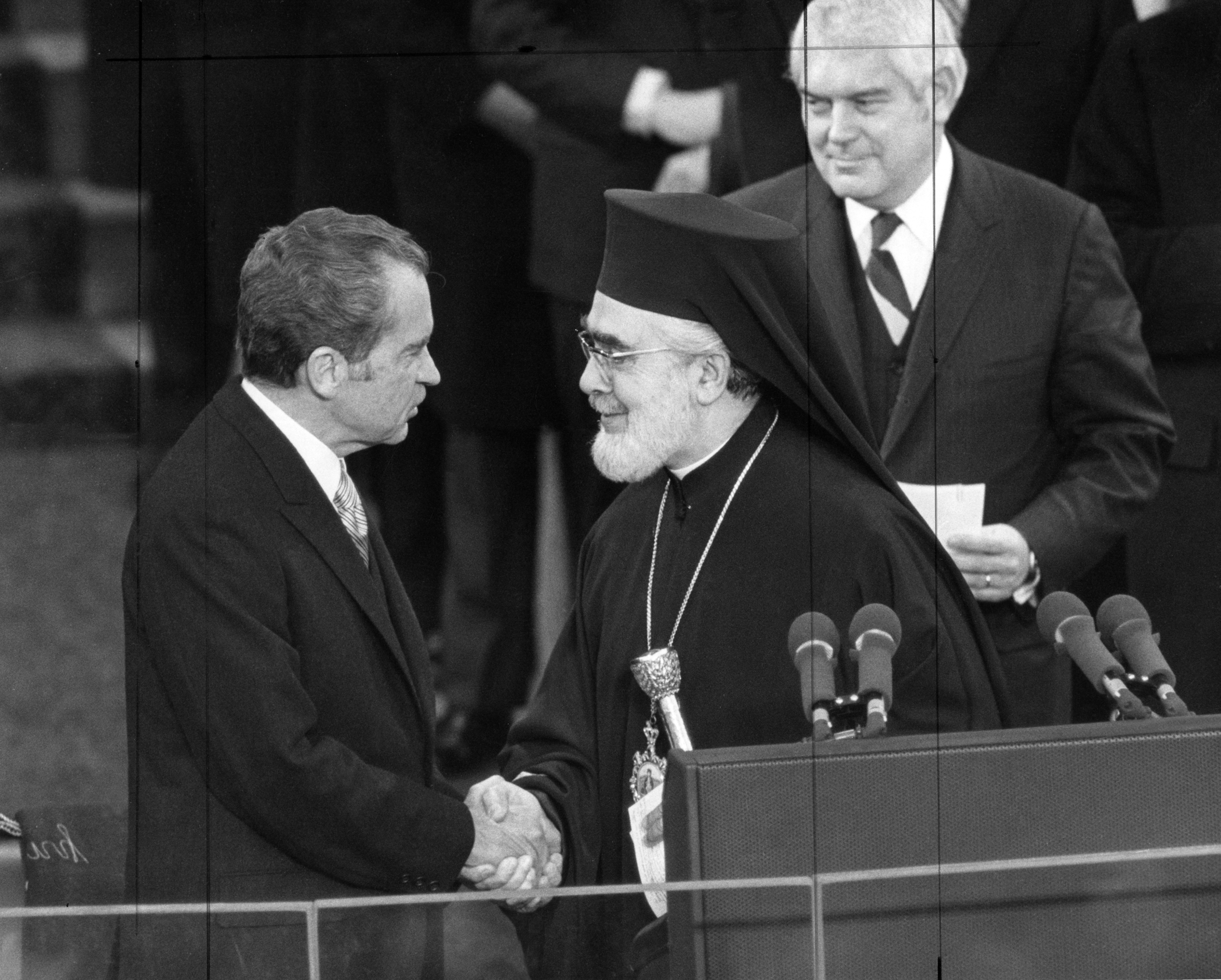
Archbishop Iakovos and President Nixon

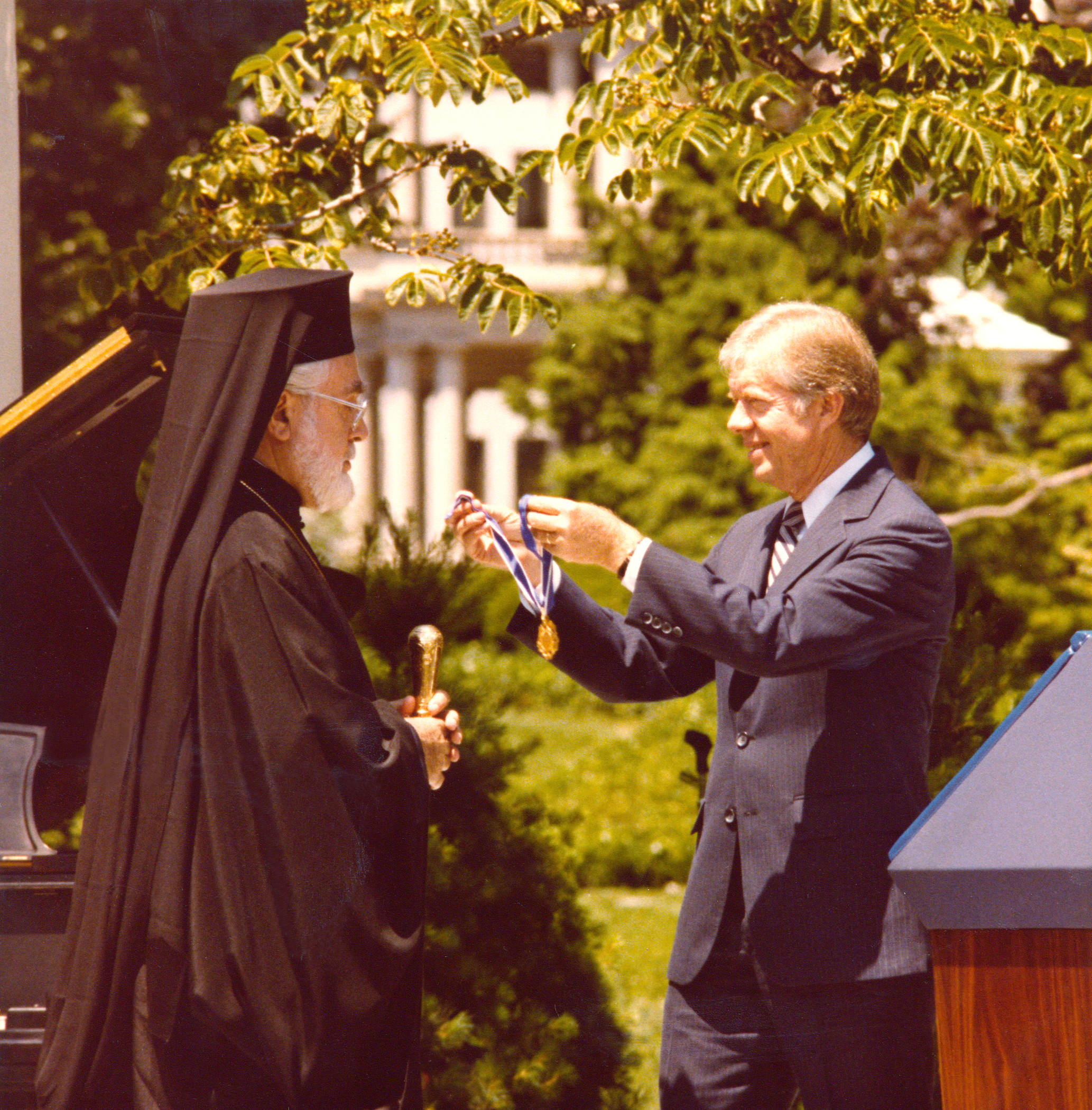
Archbishop Iakovos receives the Presidential Medal of Freedom from President Carter

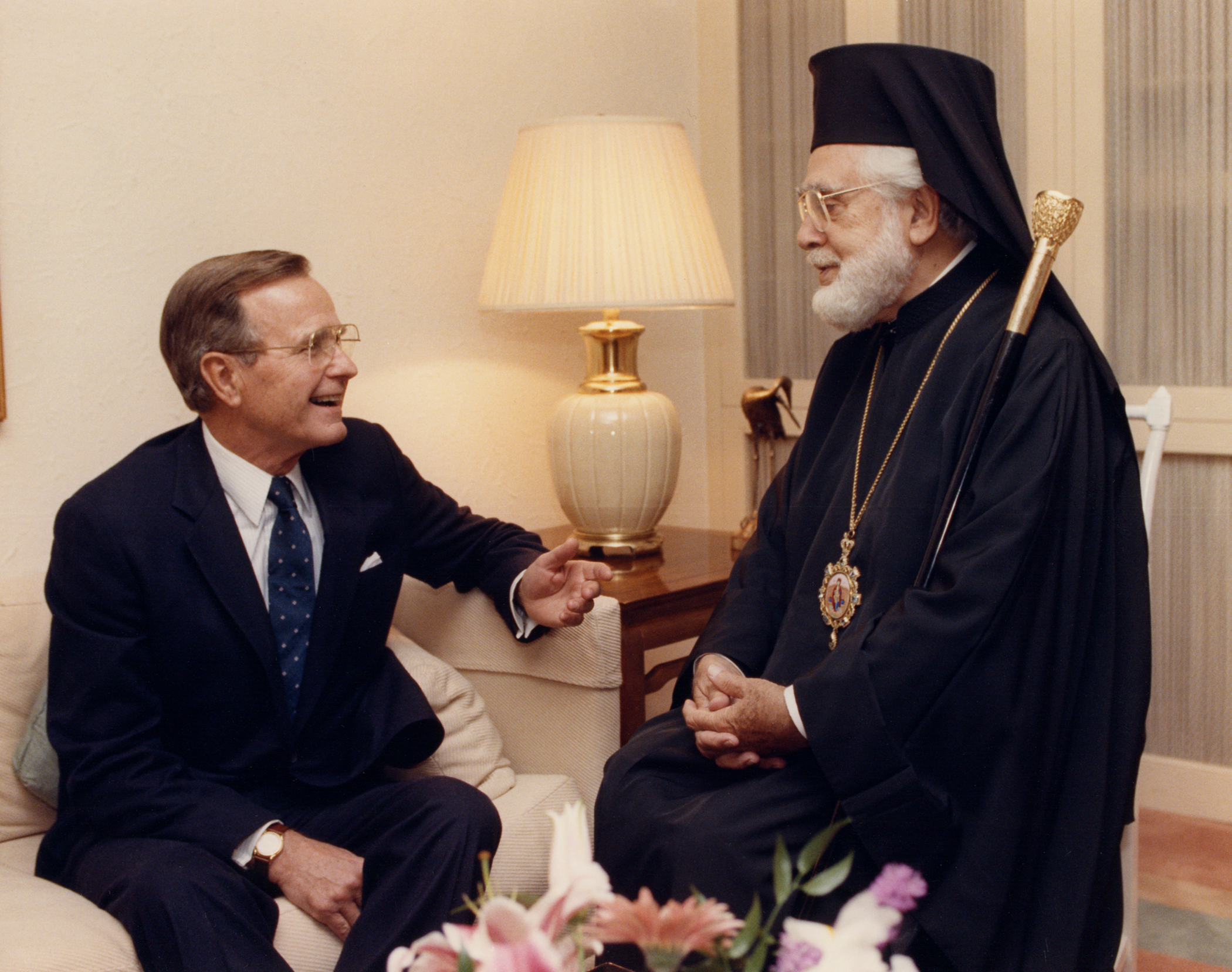
Archbishop Iakovos and President George H. W. Bush

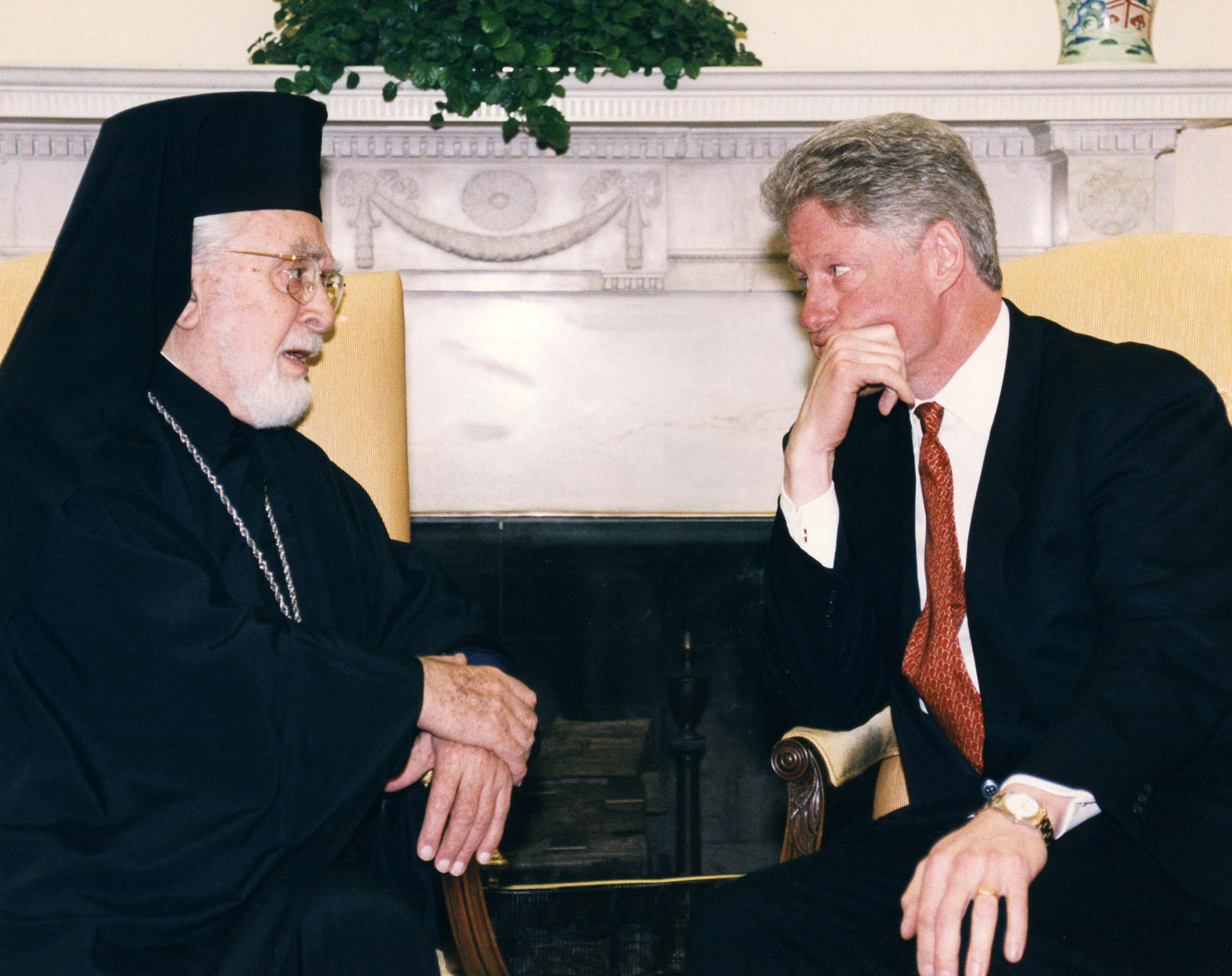
Archbishop Iakovos and President Clinton

== Books ==
- The Apanta on International Human Rights and on National Issues (University Studio Press, Thessaloniki, 2008) (ISBN 978-960-12-1692-8)
- Faith for a Lifetime: A Spiritual Journey (Doubleday, New York, 1988) (ISBN 978-0-385-19595-9)

== In popular culture ==
Archbishop Iakovos is portrayed by Michael Shikany in the 2014 film Selma.

Eastern Orthodox Church titles
| Preceded by Michael | Archbishop of America; 1959–1996 | Succeeded by Spyridon |
