= Stephen Dzubay =

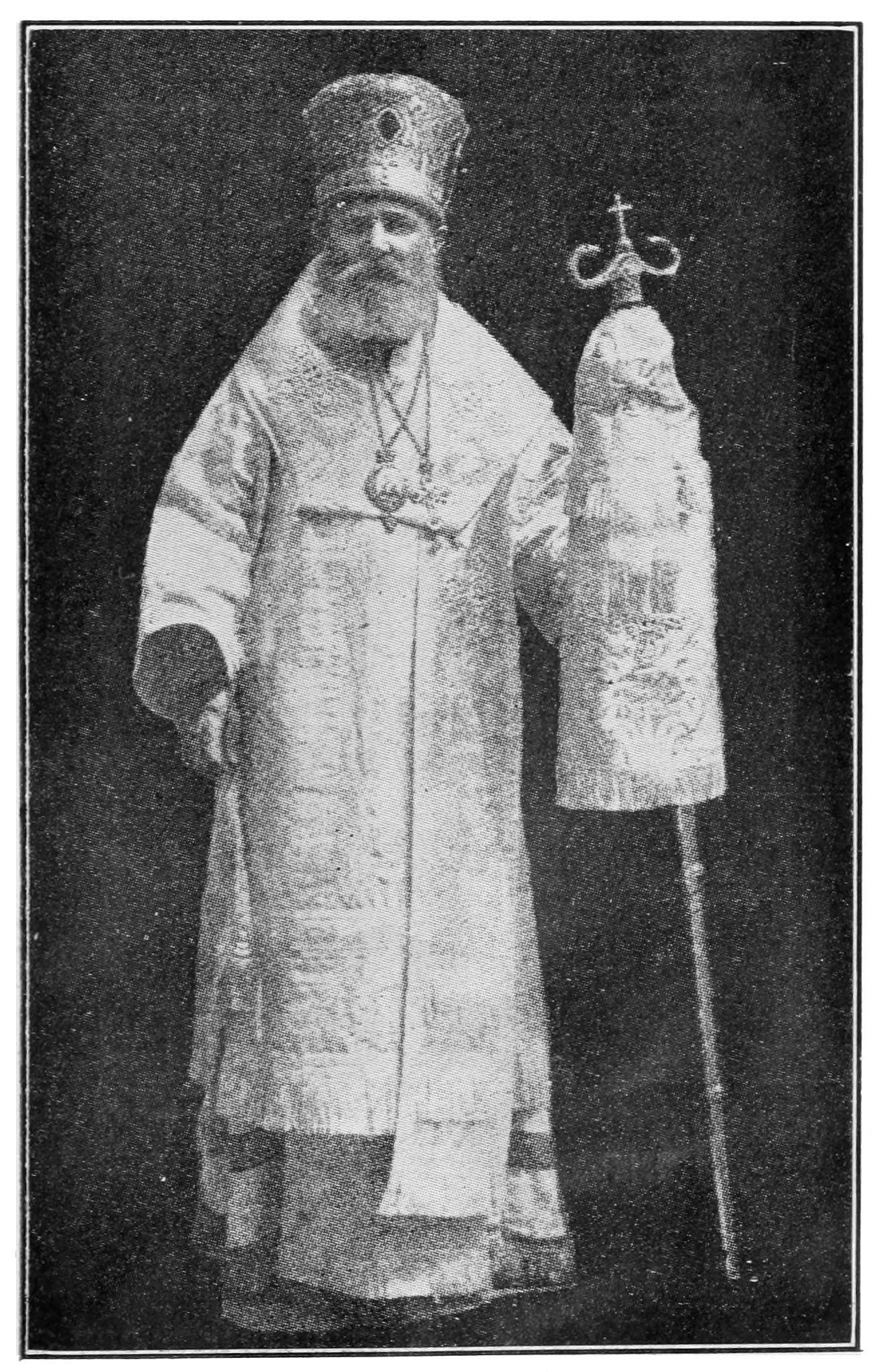
Bishop Stephen Dzuboi

Stephen Dzubay (February 27, 1857 – April 2, 1933) was a bishop of Pittsburgh of the Russian American Metropolia, then known as the Russian Orthodox Archdiocese of the Aleutian Islands and North America, between 1916 and 1924. He had served as an Eastern Catholic priest in Wilkes-Barre, Pennsylvania, prior to his reception into Orthodoxy, and had been a schoolmate of St. Alexis Toth in their native land.

== Life ==
The son of Fr. Stephen and Justine Dzubay, Alexander Dzubay was born on February 27, 1857, in Kal'nyk, Bereg County, in the Subcarpathian Rus' region of the Austrian Empire (present day Zakarpattia Oblast, Ukraine). He attended school at the gymnasium in Uzhhorod before entering the Greek Catholic Uzhhorod Theological Seminary. After his graduation in 1880, Fr. Alexander married Andrea Chuchka, the daughter of a priest.

After his marriage he entered the Holy Orders and was ordained a deacon and then a priest followed by his assignment to a parish in Lokhovo. After his wife died in November 1881, Fr. Alexander was assigned as the second priest of Trinity Church in Uzhhorod. In 1887, Fr. Alexander accompanied Metropolitan Sylvester Sembratovych of Lviv (Lvov, Lemberg) and visited Rome for a papal jubilee.

In 1887, Fr. Alexander came to the United States and took an assignment to a Greek Catholic parish in Wilkes-Barre, Pennsylvania. Having been married, Fr. Alexander came under attack by the celibate Roman Catholic clergy as he traveled, organizing parishes to serve the immigrant faithful from Europe. For his activities among the Greek Catholic parishes, Fr. Alexander was chosen their vicar by the Greek Catholic clergy. Becoming disillusioned by the Greek Catholic Church, Fr. Alexander decided to become an Orthodox. On July 30, 1916, Fr. Alexander was received into the Orthodox Church.

With his reception by the Russian hierarchy in America, Fr. Alexander was tonsured as a monk with the name Stephen. Then on August 7, 1916, he was consecrated Bishop of Pittsburgh, an auxiliary bishop, to minister to the needs of the Carpatho-Rusyns, formerly members of the Ruthenian Catholic Church, whose parishes numbered over 160 when he was received (out of roughly 200 total Russian Orthodox parishes in the American Lower 48). After only eight years of service in the episcopacy, however, Bp. Stephen returned to the Greek Catholic Church, with hopes of heading a diocese, and the Carpatho-Russian ethnic diocese of the Metropolia was dissolved.

With his advancing age, Bp. Stephen, however, retired to a Roman Catholic monastery in Graymoor, near Philipstown, New York, where he died in 1933.

== Bibliography ==
Tarasar, Constance J. Orthodox America 1794-1976 Development of the Orthodox Church in America. Syosset, New York: The Orthodox Church in America, 1975.
