= Orthodox Christian Fellowship =

North American Orthodox campus ministry

Orthodox Christian Fellowship or OCF is the official campus ministry of the Orthodox Episcopal Assembly of North America, and was formerly under the Standing Conference of the Canonical Orthodox Bishops in the Americas (SCOBA). OCF is a Pan-Orthodox campus ministry that supports local OCF chapters. Local chapters are made up of students and young adults within a college or university, or from different colleges and universities in an area. The mission of OCF is to support fellowships on college campuses, whose members experience and witness to the Orthodox Christian Church through community life, prayer, service to others and study of the Faith. OCF was previously headquartered in Boston, Massachusetts but in 2008 it moved to Indianapolis, IN. OCF provides a variety of thoughtful and innovative programming, including regional training, annual conferences, and domestic and international service learning projects to chapters on over 300 university campuses across the U.S. and Canada.

== History ==
=== Campus Commission ===
OCF has a rich history in North America that spans over fifty years. Following World War II, an Orthodox college student movement began to emerge. Individual campus groups were formed at various universities, including Columbia, McGill, and Penn State. Despite the momentum of this growing movement, there was virtually no interaction between the groups. Then, in the spring of 1965, SCOBA created its first national ministry, the Campus Commission. The purpose of this ministry was to oversee and coordinate these developing local fellowships.

James Couchell (now Bishop DIMITRIOS of the Greek Orthodox Archdiocese) was appointed as the first Executive Director of the Campus Commission. He visited hundreds of campuses, helping to establish and grow local campus chapters. Over 100 chapters developed coast-to-coast during this time. The national programs included a quarterly magazine entitled Concern as well as annual retreats, which gathered at St. Vladimir's Orthodox Seminary and Holy Cross Seminary. These nationwide retreats were the predecessors of what have become the OCF College Conferences.

In 1971, the exciting growth of campus ministry came to a halt with the reassignment of James Couchell. Shortly after, a new director was appointed, funding from the archdioceses discontinued, and in 1973, the Campus Commission was forced to close its ministry. It's estimated that campus groups dwindled to less than fifty nationwide. Without any coordinated effort, successful campus ministry was inconsistent and sporadic at best. Although, the national organization of the Campus Commission ceased to exist, the spirit and mission of the organization was kept alive by individual chapters across the country.

=== OCF Today ===
In 1997, three former seminarian classmates responsible for their respective jurisdictional campus ministry programs, pledged to work together towards the resurgence of a pan-Orthodox campus ministry. In 2000, Fr. Michael Nasser of the Antiochian Orthodox Archdiocese, Fr. Mark Leondis of the Greek Orthodox Archdiocese and Fr. Michael Andersen of the Orthodox Church in America went before SCOBA and asked for the formal reestablishment of a North American campus ministry. Each jurisdiction was petitioned for appointments. The three initiating members were joined by Natalie Kapeluck, appointed by the Ukrainian Orthodox Church of the USA.

The first official meeting of the new campus ministry of SCOBA was held in South Bound Brook, NJ, at the Archdiocesan Center of the Ukrainian Orthodox Church of the USA. The new ministry began a partnership with The Patriarch Athenagoras Orthodox Institute (PAOI) based at the University of Berkeley. The PAOI provided OCF with space for its first office and aided in providing a part-time employee.

Over the next two years, the members of the board worked to establish the framework of what is now called Orthodox Christian Fellowship, shedding its name of Campus Commission. They created a website, an online directory, the Real Break program, a short-term missions program, a student newsletter, and the College Conference program.

Looking to take the ministry to the next step, the Board hired a full-time administrator during the summer of 2002 and moved the North American office to the campus of Hellenic College/Holy Cross in Brookline, MA. At the same time, OCF received a portion of a Lilly Endowment grant awarded to Hellenic College for the Theological Exploration of Vocation. This five-year scaling grant enabled OCF to build an infrastructure, hire staff, and expand its programs. In 2008, OCF moved its headquarters to Indianapolis, IN, and hired additional staff to oversee the three-year sustainability grant awarded by Lilly to explore Christian vocation in the context of service to the poor.

In 2010, OCF celebrates its tenth anniversary of being reinstated. In ten years, the number of OCF chapters has exploded from fifty to over 300, eight of the ten SCOBA jurisdictions are represented on the Board of Directors, Real Break travels to ten locations—domestic and international, College Conference has expanded to include four sites, a National Chaplain position was developed and a network of regional chaplains has been instituted.
