= Orthodox Christian Mission Center =

The Orthodox Christian Mission Center (OCMC) is an Orthodox Christian missions organization based in the United States and supported by all the jurisdictions of the Assembly of Canonical Orthodox Bishops of the United States of America. The organization has EIN 59–3158396 as a 501(c)(3) Public Charity.

It publishes the following mission statement: "The Orthodox Christian Mission Center (OCMC) proclaims and practices the evangelical imperative of the Orthodox faith based on the Gospel of our Lord and Savior, Jesus Christ, who commissioned us to go "and make disciples of all nations, baptizing them in the name of the Father, and of the Son, and of the Holy Spirit" (Matthew 28:19). OCMC recruits, trains and sends missionaries to preach, teach, baptize and to minister to the poor, hungry, sick, suffering and orphaned. We, therefore, support the development of indigenous leaders and strengthen the infrastructures of churches, especially in, though not limited to, countries where Christianity is a minority, thus creating vibrant, eucharistic Orthodox Christian communities throughout the world."

== Current missionaries ==
1. Floyd and Ancuţa Frantz
2. Georgia Gilman-Bendo
3. Hoppe Family
4. Anastasia Pamela Barksdale
5. Christina Semon
6. Maria Roeber
7. Felice Stewart
8. Hargrave Family
9. Monk Job (Roden)
10. Kurt Bringerud
11. Faith Young
