= Archbishop Michael of America =

Primate of the Greek Orthodox Archdiocese of America (1949–1958)

His Eminence Michael
- Archbishop of North and South America
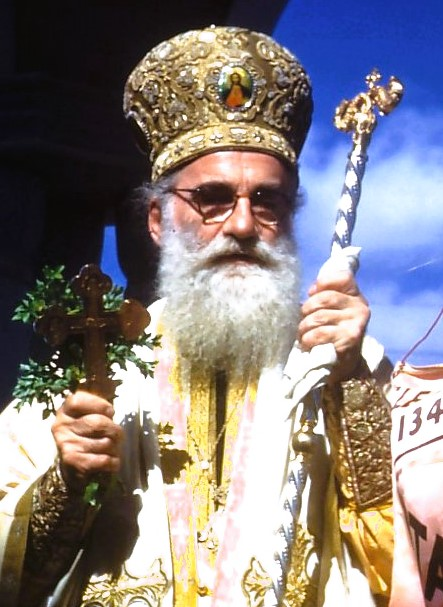
- Portrait of Archbishop Michael
- Elected: October 11, 1949
- Installed: December 18, 1949
- Term ended: July 13, 1958
- Predecessor: Athenagoras
- Successor: Iakovos
- Other posts: Metropolitan of Corinth (1939-1949)

Orders
- Ordination: 1919
- Consecration: 1939

Personal details
- Born: Thucydides Konstantinides; May 27, 1892 Maroneia, Western Thrace
- Died: July 13, 1958 (aged 66) New York City, United States
- Denomination: Greek Orthodox
- Education: Theological School of Halki

Archbishop Michael (May 27, 1892 – July 13, 1958), born Thucydides Konstantinides (Greek: Θουκυδίδης Κωνσταντινίδης), was the Primate of the Greek Orthodox Archdiocese of America from December 18, 1949, until his death on July 13, 1958. He succeeded Athenagoras who assumed the position of Patriarch of the Church of Constantinople in January 1949.

== Early life and education ==
Thucydides Konstantinides was born on May 27, 1892 in Maroneia of Western Thrace. He was admitted to the Theological School of Halki in 1907.

== Early career ==
He was ordained a deacon in 1914, after which he took the Michael as his ecclesiastical name. Michael was ordained to the priesthood in 1919. In 1927, he began to serve as the dean of the Saint Sophia Cathedral in London. He remained there until he was elected the Metropolitan of Corinth in 1939.

== Archbishop of America ==
Michael was elected Archbishop of North and South America on October 11, 1949. He was enthroned as Archbishop on December 18, 1949.

In 1950, Archbishop Michael founded the Greek Orthodox Youth of America organization.

Archbishop Michael would have accepted the throne as Archbishop of America earlier in 1949, but he was not the first choice to replace Athenagoras I. Archbishop Timotheos Evangelinidis was elected to replace Athenagoras in June 1949, but suffered a series of heart attacks before taking the throne in America, and chose to remain the Metropolitan of Australia and New Zealand until his death later that year.

He died on July 13, 1958 in New York City.

Eastern Orthodox Church titles
Preceded by Athenagoras	Archbishop of America; 1949–1958	Succeeded by Iakovos
