= Antiochian Village =

- Interactive map of Antiochian Village
- Location: 140 Church Camp Trl; Bolivar PA 15923-2512
- Nearest town: Ligonier, Pennsylvania
- Coordinates: 40.3029708°N 79.1500826°W
- Area: 280 acres (110 ha)
- Created: March 31, 1978
- Founder: Metr. Philip (Saliba)
- Owner: Antiochian Orthodox Christian Archdiocese of North America
- Website: antiochianvillage.org

The Antiochian Village Retreat and Conference Center/Camp was founded in 1978 6 miles (9.7 km) north of Ligonier, Pennsylvania. Owned and operated by the Antiochian Orthodox Christian Archdiocese of North America, it consists of both a Camp and a Retreat and Conference Center. In 1994, the Antiochian Village was the site of the Ligonier Meeting, an unprecedented and historic gathering of all Eastern Orthodox Christian bishops in the United States. The Antiochian Village also hosts other faith-based retreats, meetings and educational gatherings.

== History of Antiochian Village ==
The Antiochian Village was founded by Metropolitan Philip (Saliba) of the Antiochian Archdiocese. Through his vision, leadership, and perseverance, he established the "Village" as spiritual oasis spread over 300 acres. He dreamed of a place where children could meet for an Orthodox Christian camping experience and where adults would come to refresh their souls, retreat, relax, join together in worship, and grow closer to God. The 280-acre (110 ha) grounds were purchased from Camp Fairfield, a Presbyterian camp, in 1978, and the first camping season was the summer of 1979. In his vision for this spiritual oasis, Metropolitan Philip desired to add a retreat and conference center, monastery, and retirement community to the existing camp.

In 1985, the first phase of the Heritage and Learning Center, now known as the Retreat and Conference Center, was built with 50 lodging rooms, 6 meetings rooms, and a dining hall. In 1990, the second phase was completed with an additional 50 lodging rooms and several more meeting rooms. A new dining hall, now called the Cedars, was erected. During the second phase of construction, a research library was established to support the Antiochian House of Studies Program. Currently, there are over 21,000 volumes of theological research material, including a 1617 early edition of the King James Version (KJV) of the Bible, published just 6 years after the original printing of the KJV.

In 2004, the Antiochian Heritage Museum was built. The museum was established to foster understanding about Orthodox Christianity and Middle-Eastern Culture. The Museum offers exhibitions, films and speakers to further the greater communities understanding of the Orthodox Christian Church and the people of Antiochian heritage. The hope is that visitors to the museum may gain a greater appreciation of the history and theology of one of the oldest continuously functioning Christian communities in the world. The Heritage Museum intends to open channels of communication and understanding by exhibiting the remarkable contributions and artifacts found in the Antiochian Heritage.

== Retreat and Conference Center ==
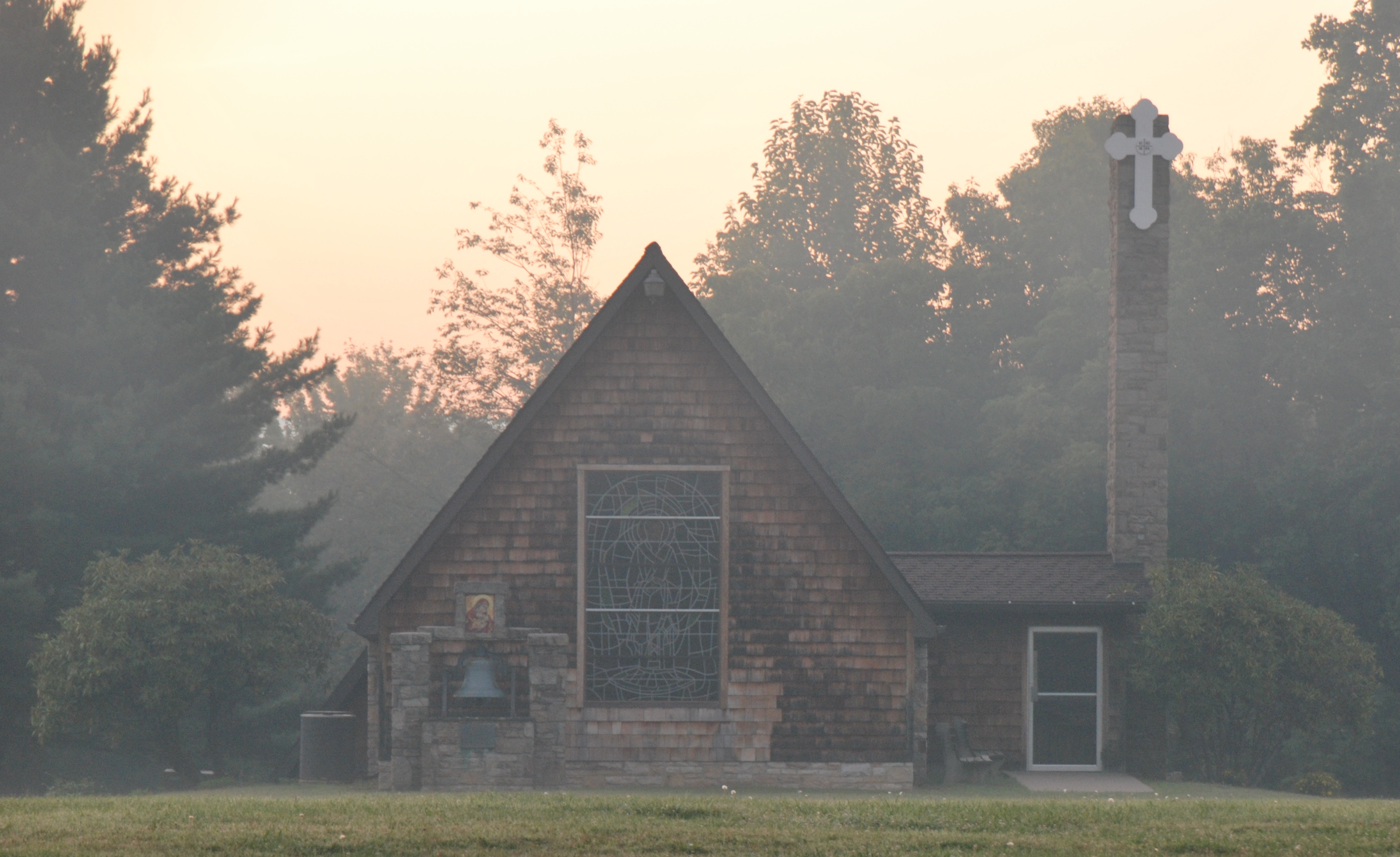
St. Ignatius Chapel

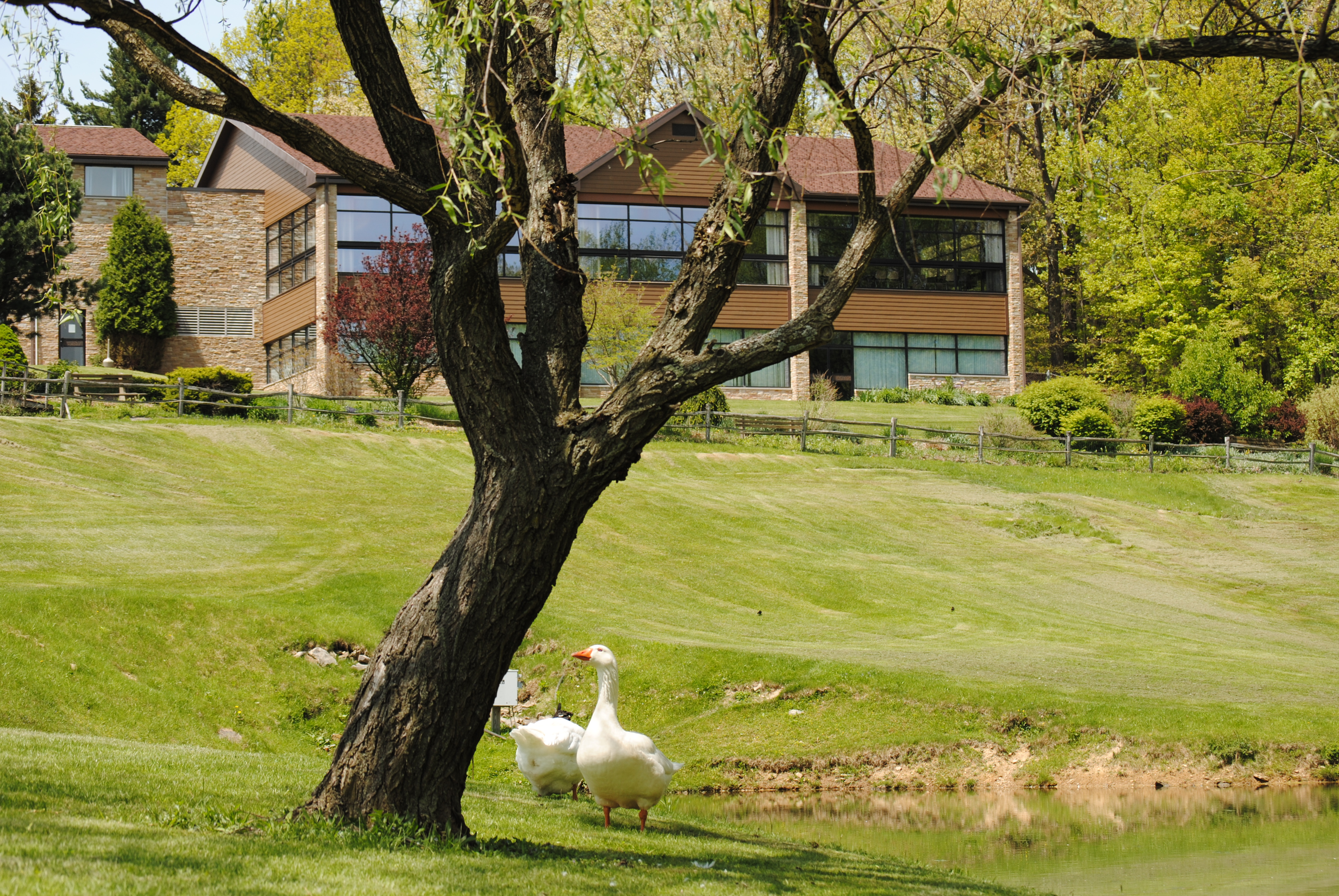
Dining Hall

The Retreat and Conference Center has one hundred lodging rooms, several meeting rooms, a group dining facility, a chapel and a theological research library. Saints Peter and Paul Chapel is the central point within the Center. In 2004, the Antiochian Village Heritage Museum was opened, featuring historical artifacts of Orthodox significance, such as icons and vestments.

"The Village" hosts Orthodox Retreats, as well as, other religious church retreats and events to included Men's, Women's, Youth, Couples, Marriage, Family, and Church plenary sessions. Approximately 300 college students annual attend the Orthodox Christian Fellowship College Conference East which is held at the Retreat and Conference Center each December. There is an annual SS Thekla and Raphael Pilgrimage every fall. St. Thekla is the patron saint of an outdoor chapel on the camp grounds, and St. Raphael of Brooklyn is buried just next to the outdoor chapel.

The Antiochian Archdiocese has many of its ministry and organization meetings as well as its biennial Clergy Symposium at the Retreat and Conference Center, due to the central location and facilities that are conducive to host such meetings.

The Retreat and Conference Center is also home to the Antiochian House of Studies. For more than thirty years, the House of Studies has been a “school without walls,” offering people throughout the world an empowering and enlightening theological graduate education. The House of Studies is physically headquartered at Antiochian Village under the leadership of the Orthodox Church. We service Christians from all walks of life. Past and current students have included people from the Eastern, Coptic, Antiochian, and Oriental Orthodox traditions.

The current Executive Director of the Antiochian Village Conference and Retreat Center is Mrs. Amy Stiffler and the current camp director is Fr. Christopher Shadid.

== Camp ==
The Antiochian Village Camp holds Summer Camp, Winter Camp, Family Camp, and Adult Camp throughout the year. The Summer Camp consists of four 2-week sessions from June to August each year. More than one thousand campers between the ages of 9 and 17, as well as over sixty staff and many voluenteers, attend the camp every summer. Some main parts of the Summer Camp program are daily services in the St. Ignatius of Antioch chapel, St. Thekla Outdoor Chapel and the various Shrines around the property, Christian education classes, a challenge course, an overnight camping program, and afternoon sports and activities. A 4-day Winter Camp for older campers (12 to 17 years old) takes place over long Presidents' Day weekend in February. Winter Camp has many of the same great elements of Summer Camp with the addition of a keynote speaker to address the campers on relevant topics, such as living as an Orthodox Christian in today's world. The Family Camp session is for families to attend together over the Memorial Day weekend and have activities for kids as well as the parents and gives the family a place to grow together in the faith. Adult Camp takes place during Labor Day weekend and gives adults 21+ a place to interact with others in a Christian environment and become kids again. Since 2006, there are "Sacred Arts Camps" during the summer for interested campers to learn Byzantine Chant and Iconography.

In addition to St. Thekla and St. Raphael, the camp's patron saints include the child saint Artemius, St. Herman of Alaska, St. Marina, SS Sophia and her three daughters (Faith, Hope & Love), the Holy Youths and St. Ignatius of Antioch. The reliquary at the St. Ignatius Chapel includes the relics of St. Herman and St. Moses the Ethiopian.

The Antiochian Village Camp has been accredited by the American Camp Association since 1982.
