= Vicariate for Palestinian–Jordanian Communities in the USA =

The Vicariate for Palestinian–Jordanian Communities in the USA is an Eastern Orthodox Church vicariate in the United States under the jurisdiction of the Greek Orthodox Archdiocese of America. In 2010, there were 6,775 congregants in 9 churches.

== History ==
The Greek Orthodox Patriarchate of Jerusalem has a history in the United States dating back to the 1920s. In 2002, Archbishop Damaskinos of Jaffa was appointed as epitropos (vicar). These parishes remained under the Jerusalem patriarchate until 2007, when it decided to leave the jurisdictional scene in North America.

On August 5, 2008, the Greek Orthodox Archdiocese of America, which is an eparchy of the Ecumenical Patriarchate of Constantinople, announced that the Constantinopolitan Church had agreed with the patriarchate of Jerusalem to transfer the Jerusalem parishes in America to a "Vicariate for Palestinian/Jordanian Communities in the USA" within the ecumenical patriarchate of Constantinople. The vicar would operate under the authority of the primate of the Greek Orthodox Archdiocese of America.

In 2008, there were 15 parishes involved: nine in California and one each in Washington state, Arizona, New York, Pennsylvania, Massachusetts and Georgia.
