= Orthodox Archdiocese of Italy =

Christian Eastern Orthodox diocese

Greek Orthodox Metropolis of Italy

Orthodox
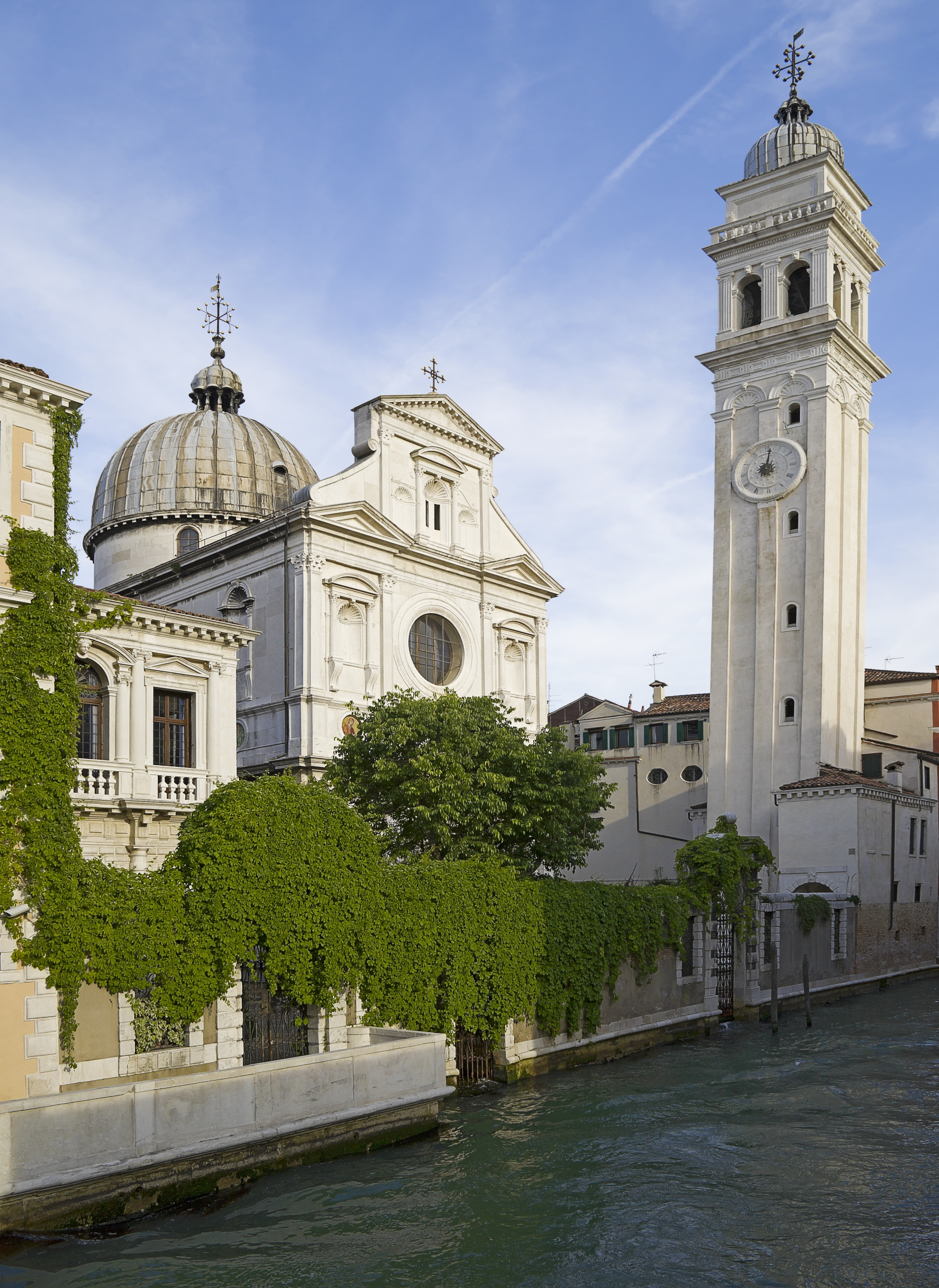
- Cathedral church of Saint George of the Greeks in Venice

Location
- Territory: Italy; San Marino
- Headquarters: Venice

Statistics
- Parishes: 80

Information
- Denomination: Eastern Orthodox
- Rite: Byzantine Rite
- Established: 1991
- Language: Greek and Italian

Current leadership
- Parent church: Ecumenical Patriarchate of Constantinople
- Governance: Episcopal polity
- Patriarch: Bartholomew I of Constantinople
- Metropolitan: Polykarpos Stavropoulos
- Auxiliary Bishops: Bishop Georgios of Krateas; Bishop Dionysios of Kotieou; Bishop Athenagoras of Thermae
- Vicar General: Archimandrite Vissarion Vakaros

Website
- ortodossia.it

The Greek Orthodox Archdiocese of Italy (and Malta from 2005 until the creation of the Exarchate of Malta in 2021), officially the Sacred Orthodox Archdiocese of Italy and Exarchate of Southern Europe (Italian: Sacra Arcidiocesi Ortodossa d'Italia ed Esarcato per l'Europa Meridionale), is a diocese of the Ecumenical Patriarchate of Constantinople with its see in Venice. The diocese was created in 1991.

The current archbishop and exarch is Polykarpos Stavropoulos.

== History ==
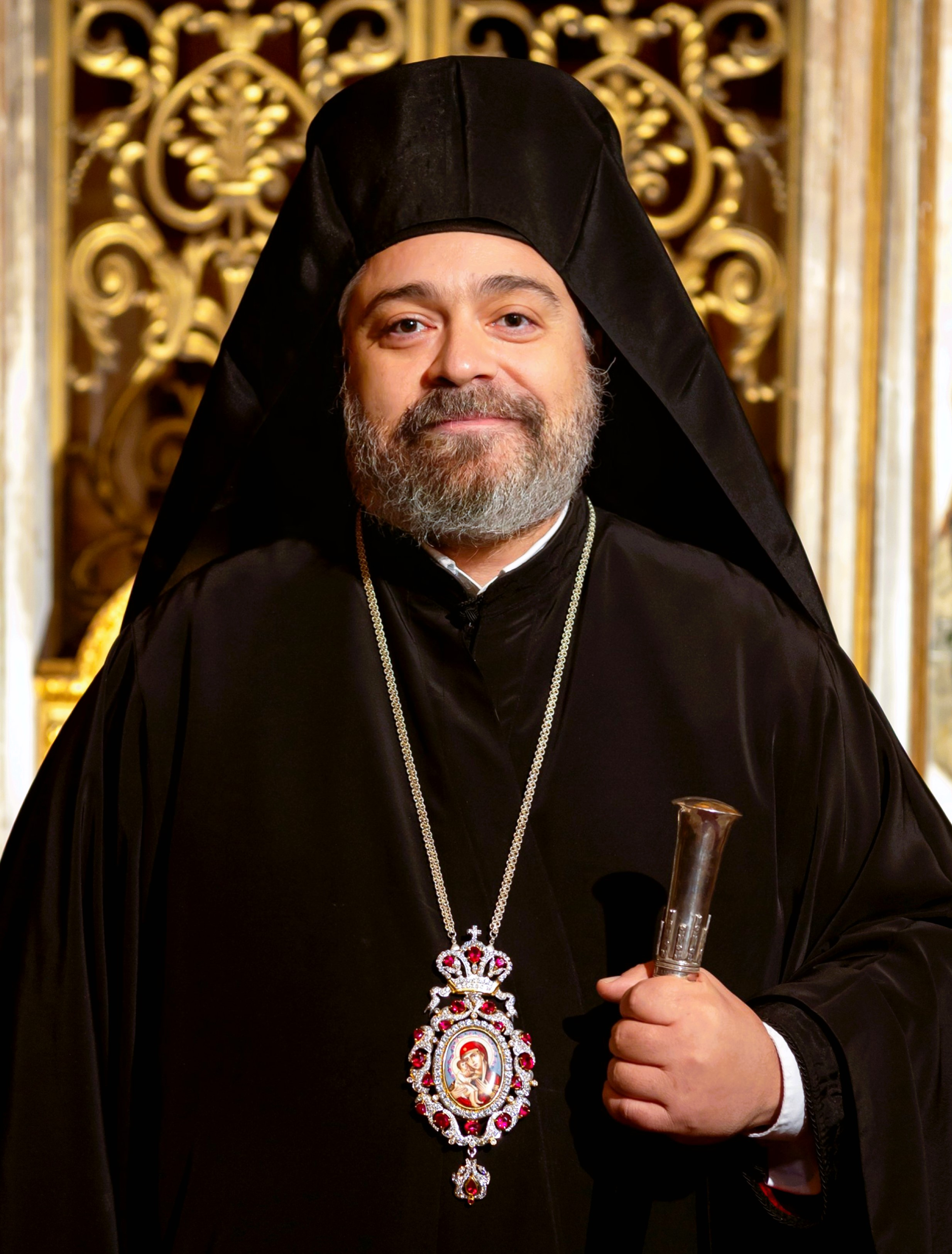
Archbishop Polykarpos Stavropoulos

After the fall of Constantinople, many Greeks sought refuge in Italy and the Ecumenical Patriarchate of Constantinople appointed a series of metropolitans, who resided in Venice from 1537 to 1797. But it was not until 1539 that the Greek community of Venice was authorised to begin building the church of San Giorgio dei Greci which still stands in the centre of the city on the canal known as the Rio dei Greci. The church was completed in 1573 and is the oldest of the churches of the Greek diaspora in western Europe.

In 1557, Venice's Greek community had nominated Pachomios, bishop of Zante and Cephalonia, to act in their church as bishop, which he apparently did for one year only. In 1577 a Greek Orthodox archbishop resided in Venice and was recognized as the religious head of the Greek Orthodox community in Venice, though with the non-Venetian title of Archbishop of Philadelphia.

== Archbishops of Italy ==
- Spyridon Papageorgiou (1991–1996)
- Gennadios Zervos (1996–2020)
- Polykarpos Stavropoulos (since 2021)

== See also ==
- Eastern Orthodoxy in Italy
- Greek Orthodox Church
- San Giovanni Theristis
- Assembly of Canonical Orthodox Bishops of Italy and Malta
- Greeks in Italy
- Grikos

== Bibliography ==
- Kiminas, Demetrius (2009). The Ecumenical Patriarchate: A History of Its Metropolitanates with Annotated Hierarch Catalogs. Wildside Press LLC. ISBN 9781434458766.
