= Spyridon of America =

Greek Orthodox archbishop (born 1944)

His Eminence Spyridon
- Archbishop of America
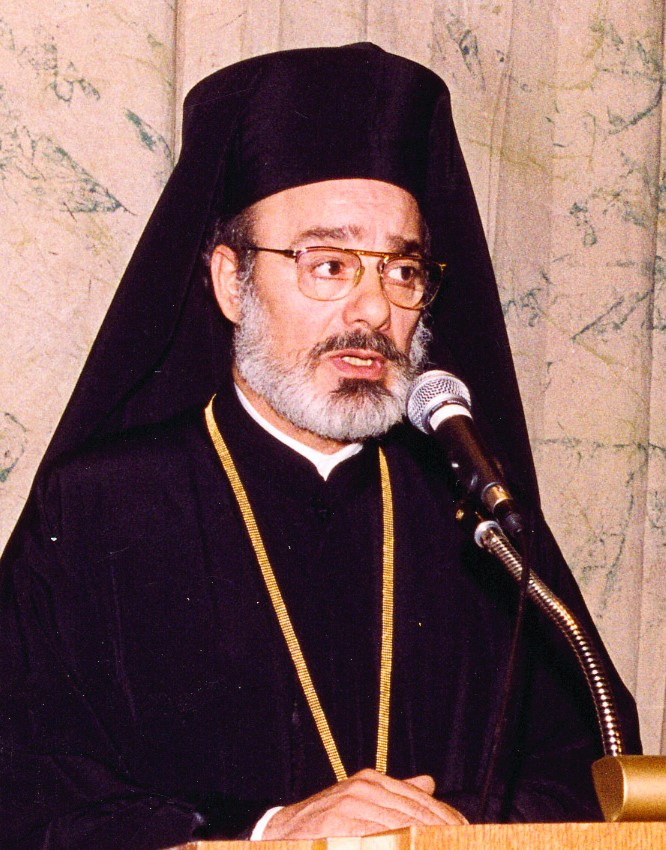
- Archbishop Spyridon of America in Montreal, Canada, 2002
- Installed: July 30, 1997
- Term ended: August 19, 1999
- Predecessor: Iakovos
- Successor: Demetrios

Personal details
- Born: George Papageorge; September 24, 1944 (age 82) Warren, Ohio, USA
- Denomination: Greek Orthodox
- Residence: Lisbon, Portugal
- Parents: Clara and Constantine George
- Education: Theological School of Halki, University of Geneva

Archbishop Spyridon of America (born George Papageorge, Greek: Γεώργιος Παπαγεωργίου) is a retired Greek Orthodox bishop of the Ecumenical Patriarchate who was the archbishop of the Greek Orthodox Archdiocese of America from July 1997 to August 1999. Internal conflicts within the church caused his resignation in 1999, after which he went into retirement, without accepting his subsequent assignment as Metropolitan of Chaldia.

== Early life ==
Archbishop Spyridon was born on September 24, 1944, in Warren, Ohio and was the son of Clara and Constantine Papageorge, ethnic Greek American parents.

Spyridon attended elementary school in both Steubenville, Ohio, and Rhodes, Greece and graduated from Tarpon Springs High School in 1962.

He studied at the Theological School of Halki where he graduated in 1966 and he then attended graduate school at the University of Geneva in Switzerland, specializing in The History of the Protestant Churches. Awarded a scholarship by the Ecumenical Patriarchate, he then studied Byzantine Literature at Bochum University in Germany from 1969 to 1973).

Following graduation, he served as secretary at the Permanent Delegation of the Ecumenical Patriarchate to the World Council of Churches from 1966 to 1977 and later served as secretary of the Orthodox Center in Pregny-Chambésy, Geneva where he was the director of its well-known news bulletin "Episkepsis". In 1976, Spyridon was assigned as dean of the Greek Orthodox Community of St. Andrew in Rome, where he served until 1985.

=== Metropolitan of Italy ===
His stay in Italy, where Catholicism is prominent, led to his 1984 appointment as Executive Secretary of the Inter-Orthodox Commission for the Theological Dialogue between the Orthodox and the Roman Catholic Churches.

In 1985, the Holy Synod of the Ecumenical Patriarchate elected him titular bishop of Apamea, assigning him as an auxiliary bishop to the Greek Orthodox Archdiocese of Austria and Exarchate of Italy, as it was then known. In November 1991, upon the creation the Archdiocese of Italy and Exarchate of Southern Europe, the Holy Synod elected Spyridon as its first Metropolitan.

During the course of the four years he served as Metropolitan of Italy, Spyridon increased the prevalence of the Orthodox Church and contributed to Orthodox unity by incorporating various Italian Orthodox communities. He gave particular attention to the Orthodox youth by creating the Union of Greek Orthodox Students of Italy and after centuries, he reintroduced Orthodox monasticism in Italy by reopening the Byzantine monastery of Saint John Theristis in Calabria.

In 1992, he was appointed chairman of the inter-Orthodox Commission for the Theological Dialogue between the Orthodox Church and the Lutheran World Federation. He was Ecumenical Patriarch Bartholomew's delegate to the Special Synod of the Roman Catholic Bishops in Europe which took place in Rome in 1991 where his address on the theological dialogue between Eastern Orthodoxy and Catholicism received much praise.

=== Archbishop of America ===
Following his productive 22-year ministry in Italy and because of his American birth, he was appointed Archbishop of the Greek Orthodox Archdiocese of America on July 30, 1997.

Spyridon stressed the importance of the Orthodox Church as a symbol of Greek-American pride. He took bold initiatives in dealing with vital matters affecting the Greek Orthodox Church of America in terms of Greek education, Orthodox theological training, the Greek American lobby and the administration of the Archdiocese.

Due to internal church conflicts, Spyridon resigned from the archiepiscopal throne of America on August 19, 1999. He never accepted his subsequent appointment as Metropolitan of Chaldia by the Ecumenical Patriarchate and on September 15, 1999, he left New York City and moved to Lisbon, Portugal, where he occasionally grants interviews and writes articles for the Greek press in America.

== Sources ==
- Biographical Profile of Archbishop Spyridon, former primate of the Greek Orthodox Church in America
- Orthodox Research Institute

Eastern Orthodox Church titles
Preceded by	Bishop of Aparmea; 1985 – 1991	Succeeded by vacant
Preceded by new seat	Metropolitan of Italy; 1991 – 1997	Succeeded by Gennadios
Preceded by Iakovos	Archbishop of America; 1997 – 1999	Succeeded by Demetrios
Preceded by	Metropolitan of Chaldia (retired); 1999 – 1999	Succeeded by vacant
