= Orthodox Inter-Seminary Movement =

The Orthodox Inter-Seminary Movement (OISM) was founded in the 1960s to foster prayer, fellowship, and cooperation among seminarians of the Eastern Orthodox Church in North America. During OISM retreats, seminarians gather together and participate in a simple program which incorporates prayer, reflection, and discussion among the future leaders of the Church.

After OISM had been dormant for a number of years, in late 2003 Fr. Michael Dahulich (dean of St. Tikhon's and also a former member of OISM) invited a number of schools to St. Tikhon's in an effort to revive the organization. At this fall retreat, students met in prayer and fellowship. They also participated in a lecture by Fr. Daniel Kovalak which emphasized the importance of missiology in the church. At a meeting which concluded the festivities, representatives from the various schools formed an interim board with the goal of re-establishing the organization.

In the Spring semester of 2004, a general assembly was convened at St. Vladimir's Seminary in Crestwood, New York. At this general assembly, in addition to St. Vladimir's Seminary, there were representatives present from St. Herman's Seminary of Kodiak, Alaska; Holy Cross Seminary/Hellenic College of Brookline, Massachusetts; Holy Trinity Seminary of Jordanville, New York; and St. Tikhon's Seminary of South Canaan, Pennsylvania. During the course of the weekend a constitution was adopted and an executive board was formed.

The executive board is composed of a president—elected at the general assembly—and two representatives from each voting member school. The current president is Paul Murray of Hellenic College Holy Cross Greek Orthodox School of Theology.

== Participating schools ==
- Christ the Saviour Seminary (ACROD)
- Hellenic College Holy Cross Greek Orthodox School of Theology (Brookline, Massachusetts) (GOA)
- Holy Trinity Orthodox Seminary (Jordanville, New York) (ROCOR)
- St. Andrew's College (Winnipeg, Manitoba) (UOCC)
- St. Herman's Orthodox Theological Seminary (Kodiak, Alaska) (OCA)
- St. Sophia Ukrainian Orthodox Theological Seminary (South Bound Brook, New Jersey) (UOCUSA)
- St. Tikhon's Orthodox Theological Seminary (South Canaan, Pennsylvania) (OCA)
- St. Vladimir's Orthodox Theological Seminary (Crestwood, New York) (OCA)
