= International Orthodox Christian Charities =

International Orthodox Christian Charities, Inc. (or IOCC), based in Baltimore, Maryland, is the official international humanitarian agency of the Assembly of Canonical Orthodox Bishops of the United States of America. IOCC works in cooperation with the Orthodox Church and other partners to serve people in need. In carrying out its mission, IOCC applies the highest professional standards and renders itself fully accountable to the public and its donors.

The organization has EIN 25-1679348 as a 501(c)(3) Public Charity; in 2024 it claimed $36,219,572 in total revenue and $27,609,180 in total assets.

Since its inception in 1992, IOCC has distributed humanitarian relief and sustainable development assistance to people facing hardship around the world. IOCC does not provide funds for Church missions such as religious education or missionary work. All funds collected by the agency (minus administrative expenses) are instead used for humanitarian aid. All assistance is provided solely on the basis of need, and helps families, refugees, people displaced in their own country, the elderly, schoolchildren, people with disabilities, and those facing or recovering from natural or human-caused disasters.

Currently, IOCC has programs in Africa, eastern Europe, the Middle East, and the US and Caribbean. Over the years, IOCC has helped people in more than 60 countries. In its decades of operation, IOCC has served people in need in many different ways, with programs that allow communities to lift themselves out of poverty and achieve economic sustainability. Its work now focuses on five key sectors:

- Emergency preparedness and response programs address the immediate needs of people amid natural disaster, war, or civil unrest—and help communities build resilience before disaster hits.
- Water and sanitation programs help improve access to clean, safe water and minimize public health threats in vulnerable communities.
- Sustainable livelihoods programs equip people to earn sustainable livelihoods through education, training, and more, helping them provide for themselves and their families with dignity.
- Food security and agriculture programs help rural families improve their nutrition, raise their standard of living, and grow their agricultural productivity.
- Health programs help protect communities’ well-being through prevention, intervention, and education, while connecting people in difficult situations with the care they need.

IOCC carries a rating of four stars from Charity Navigator, the highest rating the organization awards. IOCC is a member of InterAction, the largest alliance of U.S.–based secular and faith-based organizations working to improve the lives of the world's poorest and most vulnerable populations.

== See also ==
- Charitable organization
- Eastern Orthodox Church
- Assembly of Canonical Orthodox Bishops of the United States of America
