= List of the dioceses of the Orthodox Church in America =

In the Orthodox Church in America (OCA), the diocese is the basic church body that comprises all the parishes of a determined geographical area. It is governed by the Diocesan Bishop, with the assistance of a Diocesan Assembly and a Diocesan Council. The OCA is currently composed of twelve geographic and three ethnic dioceses. The boundaries of the ethnic dioceses overlap those of certain geographic ones. These dioceses are the result of smaller ethnic jurisdictions joining the OCA at some point in its history, usually after having broken from other bodies.

The Stavropegial Institutions are churches, monastic communities, and theological schools that are under the jurisdiction of the OCA's primate, Metropolitan Tikhon (Mollard).

| Diocese | Bishop | Territory | Chancery |
|---|---|---|---|
| Diocese of Alaska | Archbishop Alexis (Trader) | Alaska | Anchorage, AK |
| Albanian Archdiocese | Bishop Nikodhim (Preston) | California, Connecticut, Massachusetts, Michigan, New York, Ohio, Pennsylvania | South Boston, MA |
| Bulgarian Diocese | Archbishop Alexander (Golitzin) | California, Illinois, Indiana, Kansas, Michigan, Ohio, Ontario, Washington, D.C. | Toledo, OH |
| Archdiocese of Canada | Archbishop Irénée (Rochon) | Alberta, British Columbia, Manitoba, Ontario, Quebec, Saskatchewan | Spencerville, Ontario |
| Diocese of Eastern Pennsylvania | Archbishop Mark (Maymon) | Delaware, Pennsylvania | South Canaan, PA |
| Diocese of Mexico | Archbishop Alejo (Pacheco y Vera) | Chiapas, Jalisco, Mexico City, Mexico, Veracruz | México D.F. |
| Diocese of the Midwest | Archbishop Daniel (Brum) | Iowa, Illinois, Indiana, Kansas, Michigan, Minnesota, Missouri, North Dakota, Nebraska, Ohio, Wisconsin | Chicago, IL |
| Diocese of New England | Bishop Benedict Churchill | Connecticut, Massachusetts, Maine, New Hampshire, Rhode Island, Vermont | Southbridge, MA |
| Diocese of New York and New Jersey | Archbishop Michael (Dahulich) | New Jersey, New York | Syosset, NY |
| Romanian Orthodox Episcopate of America | Archbishop Nathaniel (Popp) | Alberta, Arizona, British Columbia, California, Colorado, Connecticut, Florida, Georgia, Illinois, Indiana, Massachusetts, Manitoba, Maryland, Michigan, Minnesota, Missouri, New Hampshire, New Mexico, Nevada, New York, Ohio, Ontario, Oregon, Pennsylvania, Quebec, Rhode Island, Saskatchewan, Tennessee, Texas, Virginia, Washington | Jackson, MI |
| Diocese of the South | Bishop Gerasim (Eliel) | Alabama, Arkansas, Florida, Georgia, Kentucky, Louisiana, Mississippi, North Carolina, New Mexico, Oklahoma, South Carolina, Tennessee, Texas, Virginia | Dallas, TX |
| Archdiocese of Washington | Metropolitan Tikhon (Mollard) | Delaware, Maryland, Virginia, Washington, D.C. | Washington, D.C. |
| Diocese of the West | Bishop Vasily (Permiakov) | Arizona, California, Colorado, Hawaii, Montana, Nevada, Oregon, Washington | Los Angeles, CA |
| Archdiocese of Pittsburgh and Western Pennsylvania | Archbishop Melchisidek (Pleska) | Ohio, Pennsylvania, West Virginia | Cranberry Township, PA |
| Stavropegial Institutions | Metropolitan Tikhon (Mollard) | New York, Ontario, Pennsylvania | Syosset, NY |

== Sources ==
- OCA listing of dioceses
- Orthodox Church in America on OrthodoxWiki
