= Jonah Paffhausen =

American archbishop

His Eminence Jonah
- Former Archbishop of Washington, Metropolitan of All America and Canada
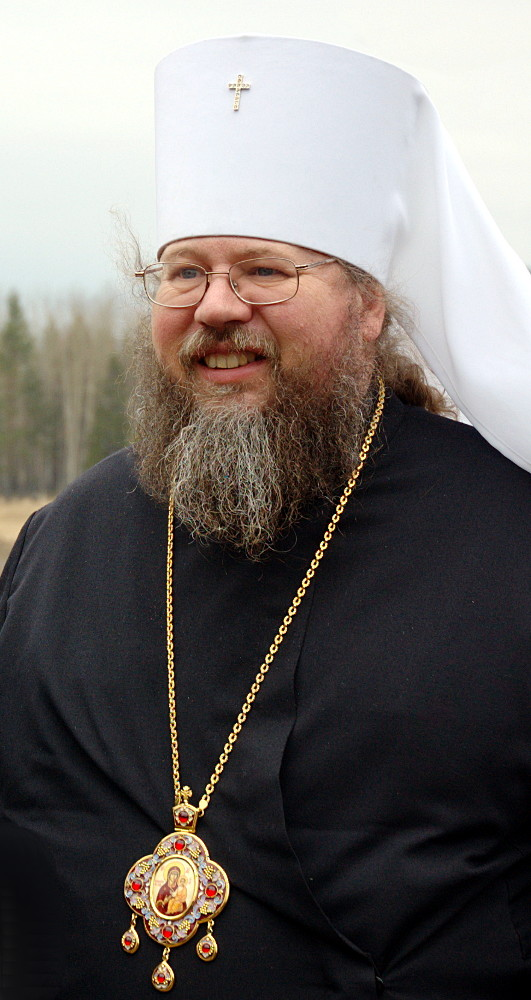
- Metropolitan Jonah in 2009
- Church: Orthodox Church In America (OCA)
- Installed: December 28, 2008
- Term ended: July 7, 2012
- Predecessor: Herman (Swaiko)
- Successor: Tikhon (Mollard)

Orders
- Ordination: October 17, 1994
- Consecration: November 1, 2008 by Dmitri (Royster), Benjamin (Peterson), Tikhon (Mollard), and Alejo (Pacheco y Vera)

Personal details
- Born: James Paffhausen; October 20, 1959 (age 67) Chicago, Illinois, USA
- Denomination: Eastern Orthodox
- Education: Saint Vladimir's Orthodox Theological Seminary

Metropolitan Jonah (born James Paffhausen, Jr.; October 20, 1959) is a retired American Eastern Orthodox bishop who served as the primate of the Orthodox Church in America (OCA) with the title The Most Blessed Archbishop of Washington, Metropolitan of All America and Canada from his election on November 12, 2008, until his resignation on July 7, 2012. Metropolitan Jonah was the first convert to the Orthodox faith to have been elected as the primate of the OCA.

On June 15, 2015, Metropolitan Jonah was released from the Orthodox Church in America in order for him to be accepted as a retired bishop of the Russian Orthodox Church Outside of Russia.

== Life ==
James Paffhausen was born in Chicago, Illinois, to James and Louise Paffhausen. He was baptized in the Episcopal Church at St. Chrysostom's Episcopal Church. He continued attending a parish of the Episcopal Church after his family relocated to La Jolla, California. It was not until age 18 that he began preparation for chrismation in a San Diego Orthodox parish of the Moscow Patriarchate. In 1978, he was received into the Orthodox Church at Our Lady of Kazan Church (Moscow Patriarchate) while studying at the University of California, San Diego. He later transferred to UC Santa Cruz and helped to establish an Orthodox Christian Fellowship chapter there.

After graduation from UCSC, Paffhausen began graduate studies at St. Vladimir's Orthodox Theological Seminary, graduating in 1985 with an M.Div. In 1988 he earned an M.Th. in Dogmatic Theology. In 1989, he began doctoral studies at Graduate Theological Union in Berkeley, California. He interrupted his studies to spend a year in Russia, working for Russkiy Palomnik in the publishing arm of the Moscow Patriarchate. During his time in Russia, he was introduced to Russian spirituality and its particular form of monastic life. In this period, the Soviet Union was dissolved.

He subsequently joined Valaam Monastery as a novice, coming under the spiritual direction of Archimandrite Pancratius (Zherdev), the monastery's abbot, now a titular bishop of Troitsk. While in Russia, Paffhausen was taken to see Fr. Pancratius' own spiritual father, Elder Cyril (Pavlov) of Trinity-St. Sergius Lavra to ask for advice in discerning his vocation. Elder Kyrill blessed him to become a hieromonk.

In 1994, Paffhausen was ordained to the diaconate and priesthood. In the following year, he was tonsured a monastic at St Tikhon's Monastery, South Canaan, Pennsylvania, receiving the religious name Jonah after St. Jonah of Moscow.

Hieromonk Jonah returned to his home state of California and was initially assigned as the priest of a mission parish, St Mary Magdalene of Merced, California. While serving there, he worked with Father Jon Magoulias of the Greek Orthodox Archdiocese of America (GOA) parish in Modesto, California to establish a mission parish under the auspices of the OCA in the Sonora/Jamestown/Columbia area of California. This mission met in the historical Roman Catholic church of Saint Anna in the gold rush town of Columbia. Father Jonah worked to establish a mission parish in Chico, California. In the midst of these activities, his goal was to establish a monastic brotherhood.

He was given the obedience to establish a monastery at the Saint Eugene's retreat at Point Reyes, California by his bishop, Tikhon (Fitzgerald). In late 1996, St. John of San Francisco Monastery was founded in Point Reyes. During his tenure as abbot, Fr. Jonah's monastic community grew to more than fifteen members, and the monastery soon moved to larger facilities in Manton. In this period, Fr. Jonah continued to work with mission parishes in Chico, Eureka, and Susanville, California, and in the Kona District, Hawaii.

== Episcopal consecration ==
In 2008, Fr. Jonah was elevated to the rank of archimandrite and sent from the monastery to take on the duties of being an auxiliary bishop for the Orthodox Church in America's Diocese of the South. In September of that year, he was officially elected to that position, and then on November 1 consecrated in Dallas as Bishop of Fort Worth, Texas led by Archbishop Dmitri (Royster), then locum tenens of the OCA's Metropolitan See. Eleven days later, on November 12, in Pittsburgh, Pennsylvania, Bishop Jonah was elected as Metropolitan of the Orthodox Church in America.

Jonah's election as metropolitan was an unusual occurrence in the history of the OCA, as he was the newest bishop in the OCA at the time. Metropolitan Herman (Swaiko) had retired three months prior to the OCA's Fifteenth All-American Council, in connection with the 2005-08 financial scandal in the Orthodox Church in America. The vacancy meant that a new metropolitan would have to be elected at the council. On the night before the election, the synod asked Jonah to address questions from the delegates regarding the recent financial scandal in the OCA. Jonah was only an auxiliary bishop at the time, and that for only ten days, but he was the only bishop at the time who was seen as untainted by the scandal.

In his largely-improvised address, Jonah heavily criticized how he had seen authority exercised by bishops and the OCA administration in the past. He stated that hierarchical authority in the Orthodox Church should be about responsibility, accountability, and spiritual fatherhood, rather than "imperial aristocracy". He said that there had been a catastrophic leadership failure in the OCA, but told the assembly that clinging to bitterness over the situation would only do further harm, and that church members had to learn to forgive in order to heal. The following morning, Jonah received the most votes from the council delegates in two rounds of voting, and was subsequently elected by the Holy Synod to be the new Metropolitan.

Metropolitan Jonah was formally installed as bishop of the Orthodox Church in America Diocese of Washington and New York at St. Nicholas Cathedral, Washington, D.C., on December 28, 2008. Several months later, the synod voted to restore a previous arrangement of having Washington as the principal city of the metropolitan's diocese, and establishing New York as a separate diocese, renaming the diocese the Orthodox Church in America Archdiocese of Washington. Jonah served as the locum tenens of New York until the Orthodox Church in America Diocese of New York and New Jersey enthroned its own bishop in 2010.

In accordance with Orthodox canon law and the OCA Statute, which stipulate that a diocesan bishop must live within the geographic boundaries of his diocese, Jonah maintained his residence and office in Washington, D.C., while regularly working at the OCA headquarters in Oyster Bay Cove, New York.

== Activities ==
In November 2009, Jonah signed an ecumenical statement known as the Manhattan Declaration, which called on evangelicals, Catholics and the Orthodox not to comply with rules and laws permitting abortion, same-sex marriage and other matters that go against their religious consciences.

Regarding ecumenical relations with non-Orthodox jurisdictions and Christian denominations, Jonah severed contacts with The Episcopal Church, due to their acceptance of same-sex relationships, turning to support the Anglican Church in North America (ACNA). He also expressed a desire to establish full communion between the OCA and the ACNA. Jonah supported the creation of the ACNA, addressing his assembly in 2009.

Jonah let it be known that he expected his bishops to be present at the annual March for Life each January in Washington, DC. He publicly threatened to pull some 26 OCA military chaplains out of the American military if they were asked to officiate at same-sex marriages or condone homosexuality in any way. He made some statements critical of fellow Orthodox leaders and made it known he wanted to permanently move church headquarters from Oyster Bay Cove, New York to Washington, DC. While some Orthodox applauded his proposed changes, others objected over what they considered to be rash and intemperate remarks.

Other OCA leaders forced Jonah to take a retreat ostensibly for spiritual and personal renewal from February 25 to April 24, 2011. Archbishop Nathaniel of Detroit assisted in temporary administration of the OCA during Jonah's retreat.

In 2011 and extending into 2012, Jonah presided at or participated in several events of historical significance in the Orthodox Church. These included a February 2011 concelebration with Metropolitan Hilarion (Alfeyev) of Volokolamsk and Archbishop Justinian (Ovchinnikov) of Naro-Fominsk in St. Nicholas Cathedral in New York City. In that same month, Jonah also met Metropolitan Christopher of the Czech Lands and Slovakia, as well as Patriarch Irinej of the Serbian Orthodox Church.

In May and December 2011, Jonah concelebrated with Metropolitan Hilarion (Kapral) of the Russian Orthodox Church Outside Russia (ROCOR). These were the first concelebrations between hierarchs of the OCA and ROCOR. The May Divine Liturgy was the first concelebration between the Primate and First Hierarch of the respective churches, and the December liturgy involved many more bishops from both Synods.

In August 2011, Jonah was to have travelled to Prague to visit the Orthodox Church of the Czech Lands and Slovakia, but cancelled his portion of the trip in order to tend to the dying Archbishop Dmitri (Royster) of Dallas. Bishop Benjamin (Peterson), who was to have accompanied Jonah, traveled to Prague in his stead.

Also in August 2011, Jonah's first book was published by St. Vladimir's Seminary Press. Titled Reflections on a Spiritual Journey, the book is a collection of several of Jonah's writings, speeches, and interviews, both from his time as abbot and mission priest as well as after his election as Metropolitan.

On January 1, 2012, he presided at the Divine Liturgy at a ROCOR parish, St. John the Baptist in Washington, DC, with the blessing of Metropolitan Hilarion (Kapral). This was the first time an OCA bishop had led Divine Liturgy at a ROCOR parish, in the absence of any ROCOR bishops. Several OCA and ROCOR priests concelebrated on this historic occasion.

== Resignation ==
On July 6, 2012, Jonah tendered his resignation as Primate of the Orthodox Church in America. A later statement released by the OCA's Synod of Bishops said that their request that he either resign or take a leave of absence for treatment "came at the end of a rather long list of questionable, unilateral decisions and actions, demonstrating the Metropolitan's inability to be truthful and accountable to his peers". The statement also alleged that Jonah had interfered with the proper investigation of multiple complaints of clerical sexual misconduct. The synod's allegations were subsequently disputed for apparent internal inconsistency, witness testimony that contradicted the allegations, use of language that was apparently misleading and could have distorted press coverage of the event, as well as the allegations' apparent inconsistency with other OCA investigations and their conclusions. The accusatory statement no longer appears on the OCA website as of 8 December 2015.

Jonah and his legal representative engaged in negotiations with the OCA for several months, beginning sometime before November 9, 2012. These negotiations eventually resulted in an agreement with the Holy Synod of the OCA regarding his retirement on May 27, 2013, during a meeting at St. Tikhon's Monastery with Jonah's future successor, then-Archbishop Tikhon (Mollard), the current primate of the OCA, and other synod members.

On June 15, 2015, Metropolitan Jonah was released from the Orthodox Church in America in order for him to be accepted as a retired bishop within the Russian Orthodox Church Outside Russia.

== Ministry in ROCOR ==
After his acceptance into ROCOR, Metropolitan Jonah continued serving and teaching regularly at the Russian Orthodox Cathedral of St. John the Baptist in Washington, DC, which he had started doing as a retired OCA bishop.

In September 2017, Metropolitan Jonah was assigned as rector of St. Herman of Alaska Orthodox Church in Stafford, Virginia, and transferred his teaching ministry there.

In October 2020, Metropolitan Jonah relocated to Spotsylvania Courthouse, Virginia and founded St. Demetrios Orthodox Monastery, becoming the new monastery's abbot while continuing to serve as rector of St. Herman's. By 2023, the monastery had twelve members of the brotherhood.

Eastern Orthodox Church titles
Preceded by Herman (Swaiko)	Primate of the Orthodox Church in America; 2008–2012	Succeeded by Tikhon (Mollard)
