= Orthodox Church in America Diocese of Eastern Pennsylvania =

Diocese of the Orthodox Church in America

Diocese of Eastern Pennsylvania

orthodox

Location
- Country: United States
- Territory: Eastern Pennsylvania
- Metropolitan: Tikhon (Mollard)

Information
- Denomination: Eastern Orthodox
- Rite: Byzantine Rite

Current leadership
- Parent church: Orthodox Church in America
- Archbishop: Mark (Maymon)

Map
- The states in which the Diocese of Eastern Pennsylvania has jurisdiction.

Website
- doepa.org

The Diocese of Eastern Pennsylvania is a diocese of the Orthodox Church in America (OCA). Its territory includes parishes, monasteries, and missions located in two states in the United States – Delaware and Pennsylvania. The diocesan chancery is located in South Canaan Township, Pennsylvania.

== Bishops ==
- Adam (Filippovskiy) (1935-1944)
- Nikon (de Greve) (September 19, 1947 - May 7, 1952)
- Demetrius (Magan) (c. 1953-1964)
- Cyprian (Borisevich) (1964 - 14 December 1980)
- Herman (Swaiko) (March 17, 1981 - July 22, 2002)
- Tikhon (Mollard) (February 14, 2004 - November 13, 2012)
  - Melchisedek (Pleska) (13 November 2012 - 18 March 2014) locum tenens
- Mark (Maymon) (since March 18, 2014)

== Deaneries ==
The diocese is grouped geographically into three deaneries, each consisting of a number of parishes. Each deanery is headed by a parish priest, known as a dean. The deans coordinate activities in their area's parishes, and report to the diocesan bishop. The current deaneries of the Diocese of Eastern Pennsylvania are:

- Frackville Deanery – Pennsylvania
- Philadelphia Deanery – Delaware and Pennsylvania
- Wilkes-Barre Deanery – Pennsylvania

== Diocesan Departments ==
The diocese has several active departments, including

- the Missions department
- the Office of Church School Education and Curriculum
- the Office of Young Adult Activities
- the Liturgical Life Committee, and the Office of Vocations.

A Diocesan Revitalization committee has also been created for the purpose of revitalizing all parishes within the diocese, to foster spiritual growth and address the various challenges facing the Diocese today.
