= Diocese of Washington =

Diocese of Washington may refer to:

- the Episcopal Diocese of Washington
- the Roman Catholic Archdiocese of Washington
- the Orthodox Church in America Archdiocese of Washington
