= Benjamin Peterson (bishop) =

Orthodox bishop of New England (born 1954)

His Eminence Benjamin The Most Reverend
- Archbishop of the West
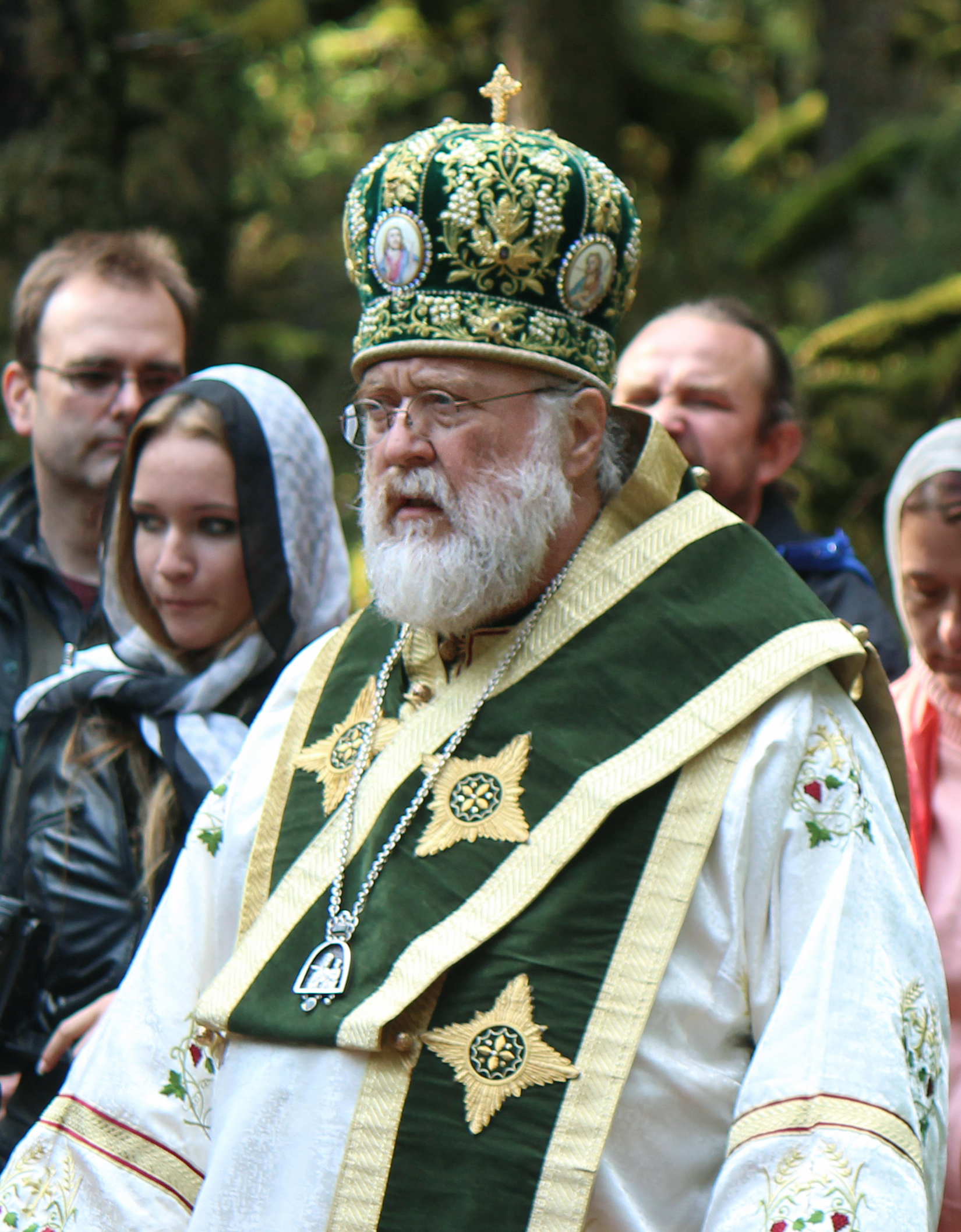
- Archbishop Benjamin in 2012
- Archdiocese: Orthodox Church in America Diocese of the West
- See: Los Angeles
- Elected: March, 2007
- Installed: October 2, 2007
- Predecessor: Tikhon Fitzgerald
- Successor: Vasily Permiakov
- Previous post: Bishop of Berkeley (2004-2007)

Orders
- Ordination: November 15, 1987 (diaconate); July 19, 1997 (priesthood)
- Consecration: May 1, 2004

Personal details
- Born: Vincent Peterson; June 1, 1954 (age 72) Pasadena, California
- Denomination: Eastern Orthodox
- Education: Saint Vladimir's Seminary

Benjamin Peterson (born Vincent Peterson (born June 1, 1954)) is a retired Archbishop of the Orthodox Church in America. He served as ruling hierarch of Diocese of the West from 2007 to 2025.

== Early life and biography ==
Peterson was born Vincent Peterson in Pasadena, California on June 1, 1954. He was baptized into the Orthodox faith on April 27, 1972. He enrolled in Saint Vladimir's Seminary, graduating with a Master of Divinity in 1978. Before entering the clergy, he was chairman of the Orthodox Church in America’s Department of Liturgical Music and served as choirmaster at several parishes in Detroit, Michigan, and in Los Angeles.

On November 15, 1987 Peterson was ordained to the deaconate by Bishop Tikhon, and tonsured a rasophore monk in the following year. Later, he was further tonsured to the rank of lesser schema by Archbishop Herman at Saint Tikhon Monastery in South Canaan, Pennsylvania. He was sent to the Diocese of Alaska in 1999 to serve as dean of the Saint Innocent Cathedral in Anchorage, and later as administrative dean of Saint Herman Theological Seminary in Kodiak, where he was elevated to the rank of archimandrite.

== Bishop ==
In January 2004, Peterson was transferred to Los Angeles where he served as Chancellor of the Diocese of the West and reassigned to the Holy Virgin Mary Cathedral. In March 2004, he was elected to the episcopacy and given the position of Bishop of Berkeley, Auxiliary to the Diocese of the West. He was consecrated on May 1, 2004 at the Holy Trinity Cathedral in San Francisco.

Following the retirement of the previous bishop, Bishop Tikhon, Peterson served as temporary administrator of the diocese on November 14, 2006. He was nominated for the position of bishop in January 31, 2007, was canonically elected in March, and was consecrated October 2 of that same year. He was elevated to rank of Archbishop on May 9, 2012.

On June 8, 2014 he visited Durango, Colorado, reflecting on its Czech and Slovak heritage as well as expressing hope that the diocese would continue to grow. In addition to his roles, he also served as administrator of the Diocese of Alaska from 2008 to 2009, and as locum tenens from 2009 to 2014.

== Health and retirement ==
In April 2021, he announced he was diagnosed with early stages of Parkinson's disease. On December 8, 2024 he announced his upcoming retirement, taking effect on July 15, 2025. Under his tenure, the diocese grew by 18%.

He was succeeded by Bishop Vasily Permiakov.

Eastern Orthodox Church titles
Preceded by Tikhon Fitzgerald	Bishop of the West; March 20, 2007 — July 15, 2025	Succeeded by Vasily Permiakov
