= Holy Monastery (Meteora) =

Former monastery in Kalabaka Municipality, Thessaly Region, Greece

- Αγία Μονή
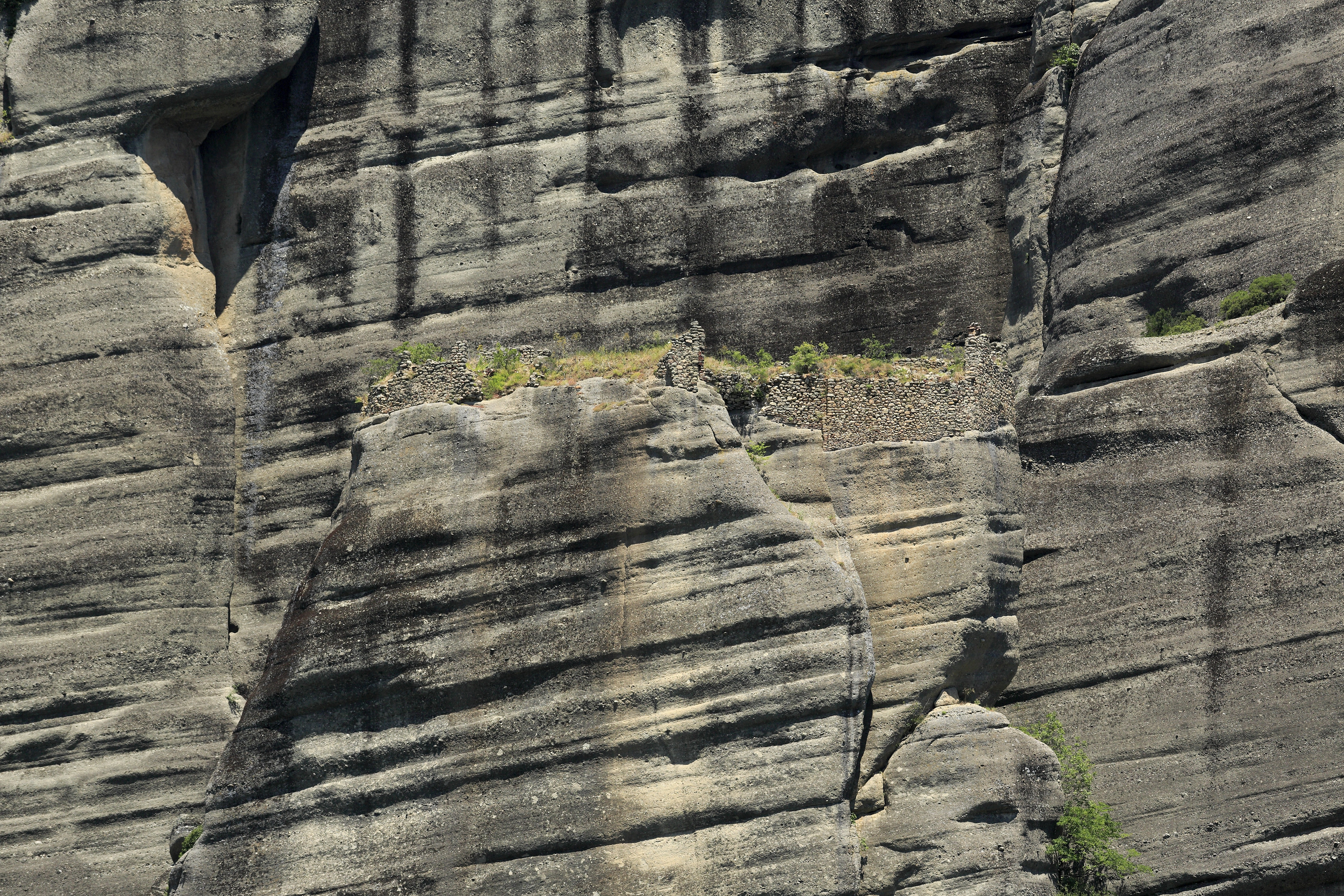
- The ruins of the monastery

- Location of the former monastery in Greece
- Holy Monastery
- 39°43′26″N 21°37′41″E
- Location: Kalabaka, Thessaly
- Country: Greece
- Denomination: Greek Orthodox (former)

History
- Status: Monastery (former)

Architecture
- Functional status: Inactive (in partial ruins)
- Architectural type: Monastery
- Style: Byzantine (Athonite)
- Completed: c. 15th century

The Holy Monastery (Greek: Αγία Μονή, romanized: Agia Moni) is a former Greek Orthodox monastery that is part of the Meteora monastery complex in Kalabaka, in the Thessaly region of central Greece.

== Names ==
Other names for monastery include:

- Nea Moni (Νέα Μονή) 'New Monastery'
- Moni Genesiou tes Theotokou (Μονή Γενεσίου της Θεοτόκου) 'Monastery of the Birth of the Theotokos'
- Moni ton Eisodion tis Teokokou (Μονή των Εισοδίων της Θεοτόκου) 'Monastery of the Entry of the Theotokos'
- Keli tou Varlaam (Κελί του Βαρλαάμ) 'Cell of Varlaam'

== Description ==
The monastery was mentioned in 1614, which at the time was inhabited by more than 20 monks. The monastery had also sought to gain recognition as a stavropegion. Today, only ruins remain on a narrow rock that is overshadowed by Ypsilotera Rock.

The Cave of St. Athanasius of Meteora is located next to the Holy Monastery.

== Gallery ==
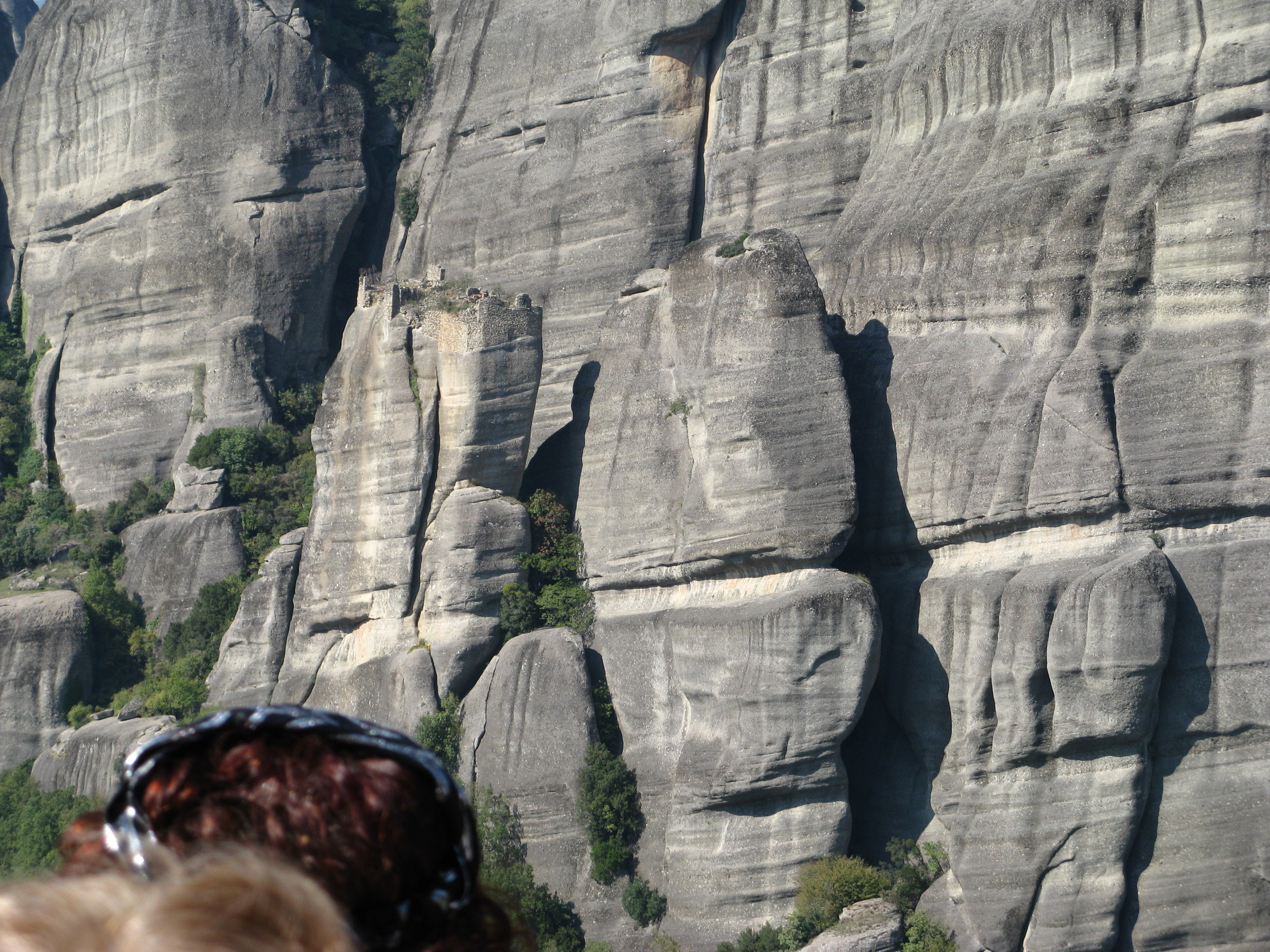

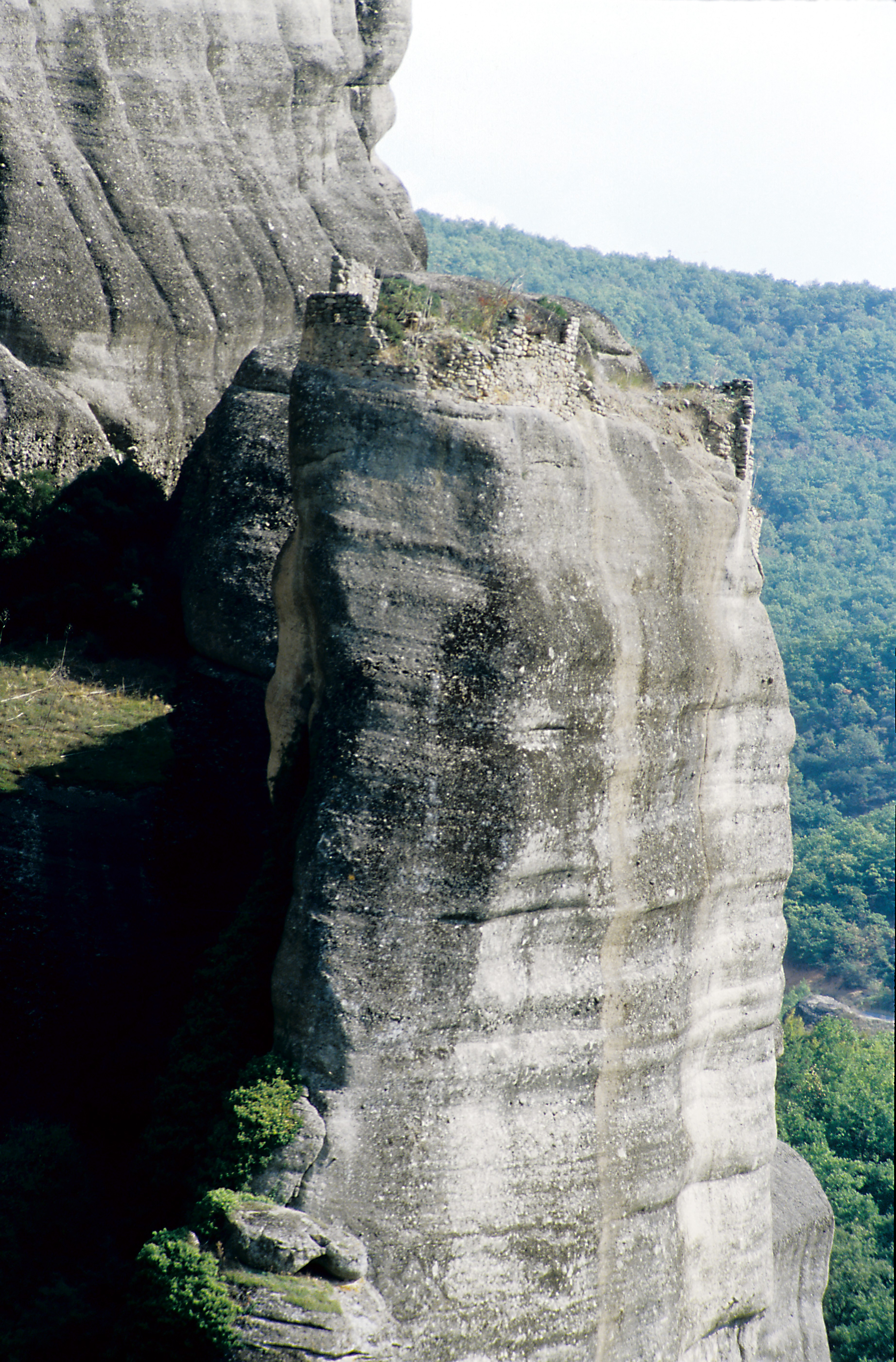

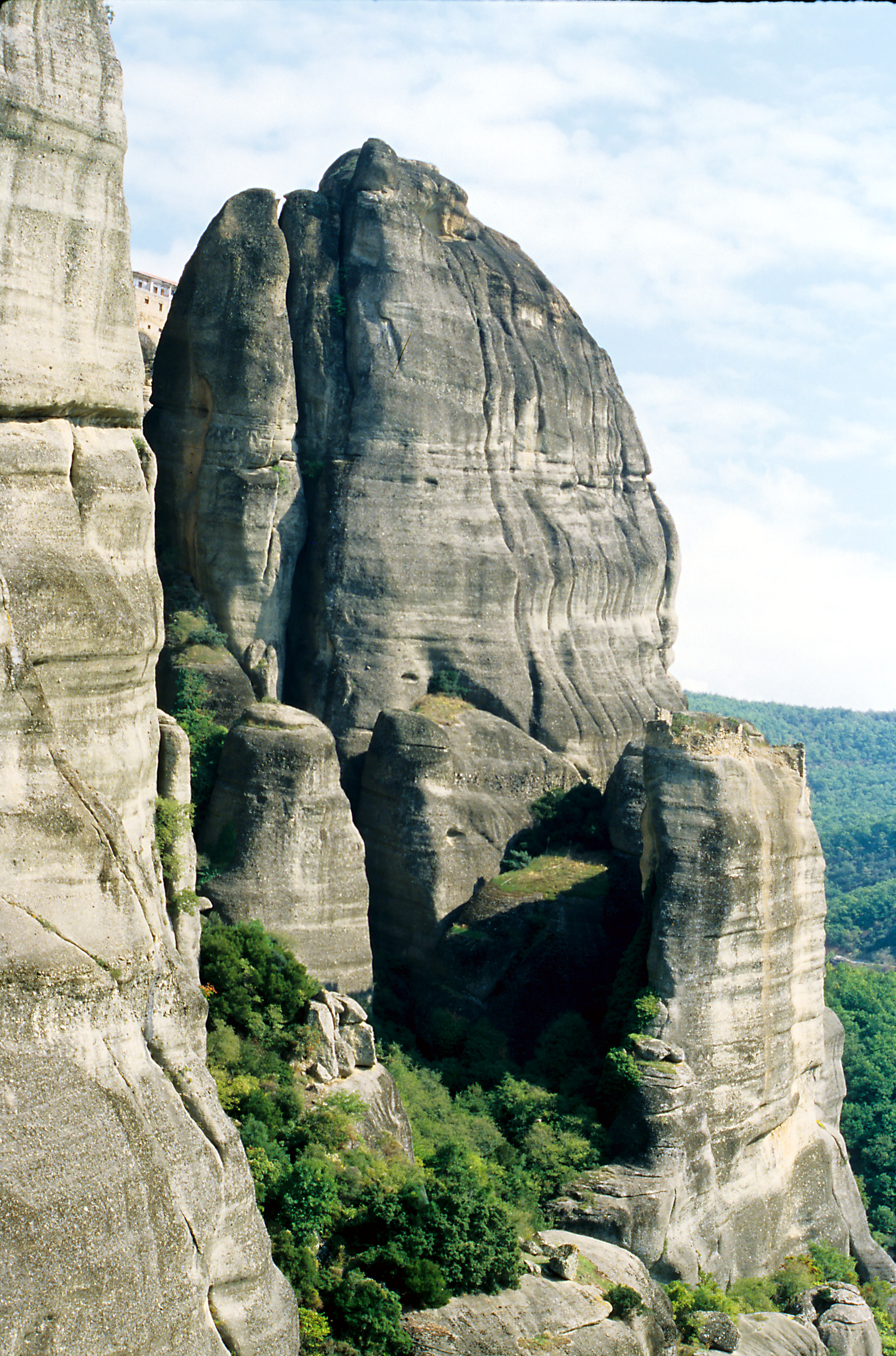

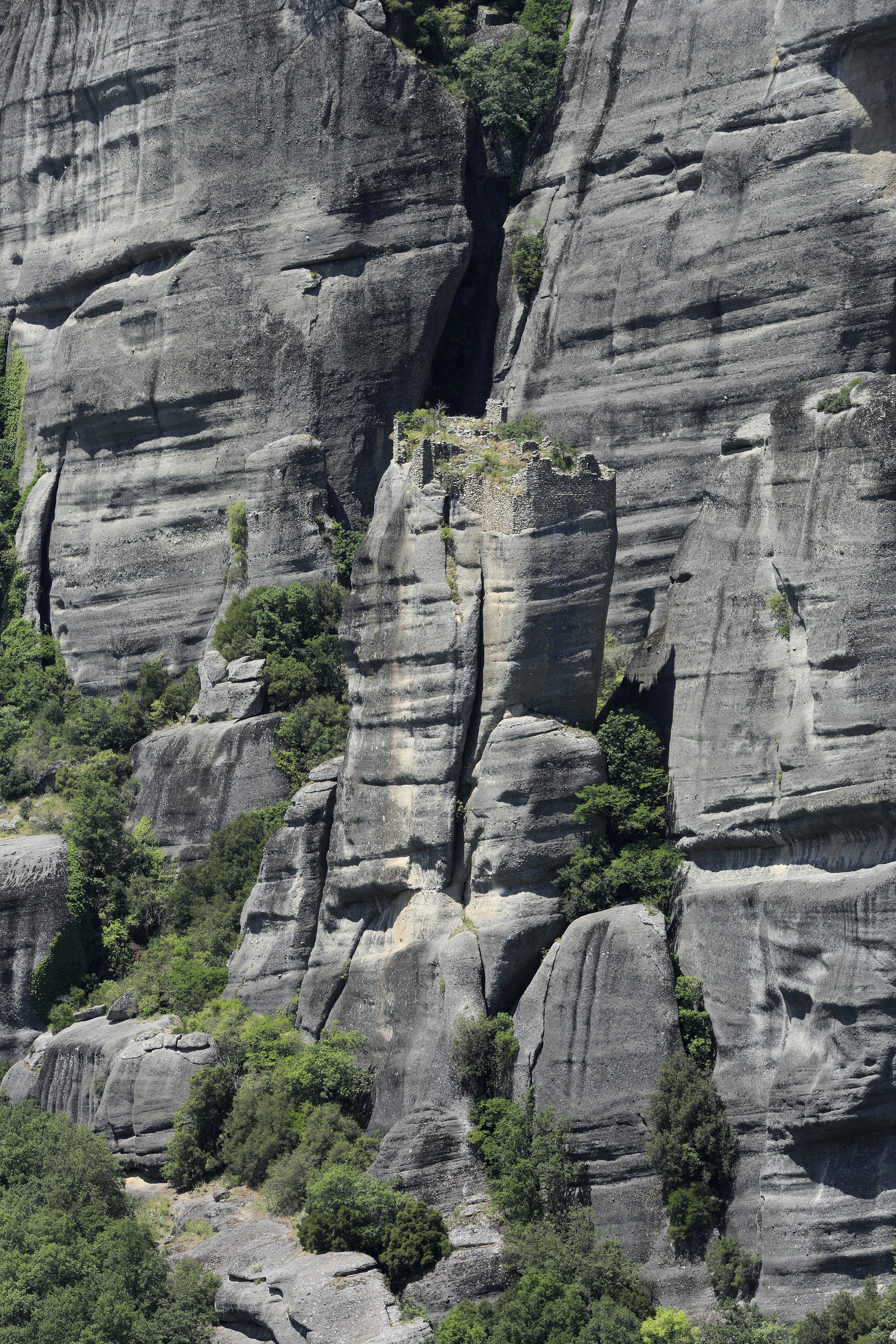

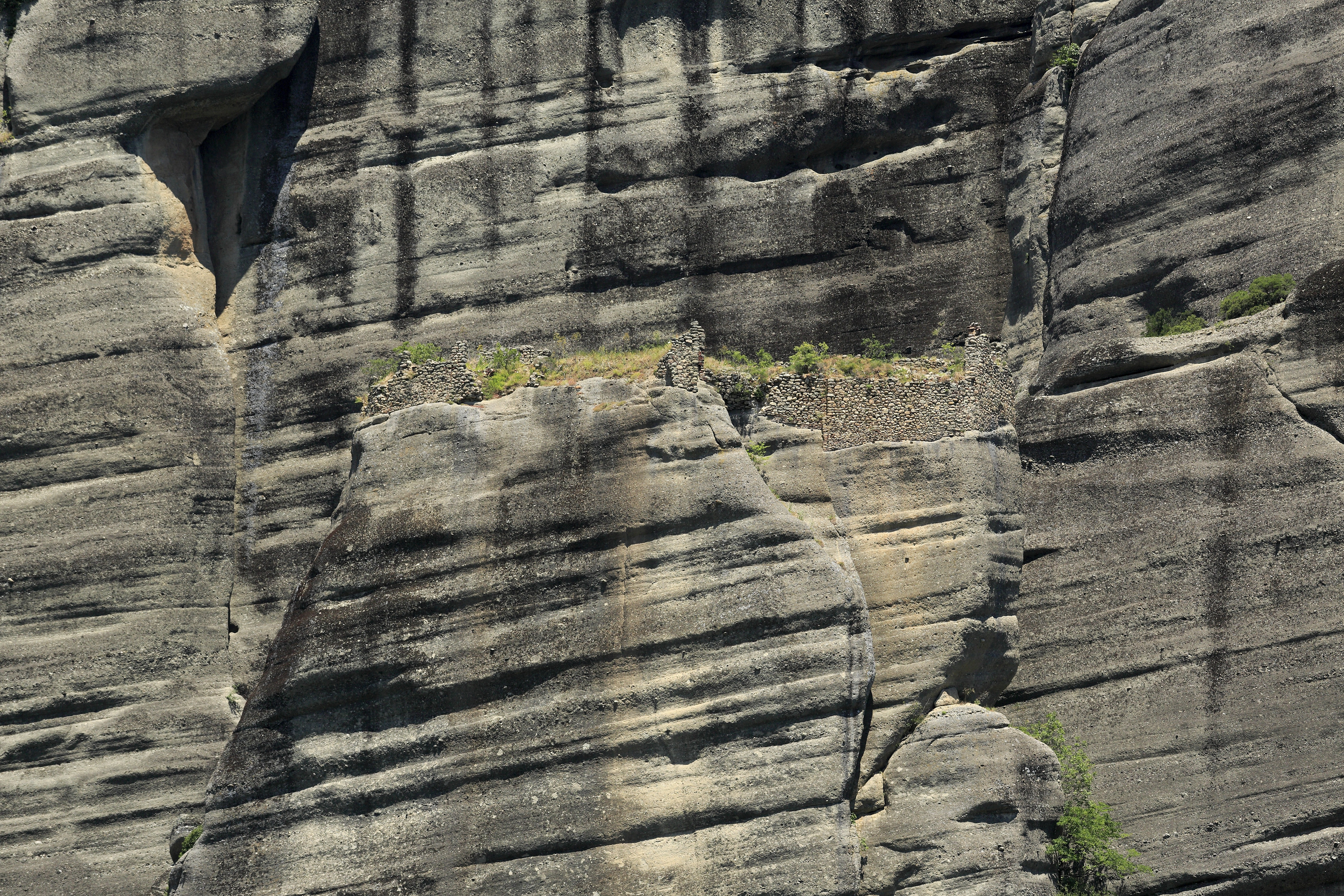

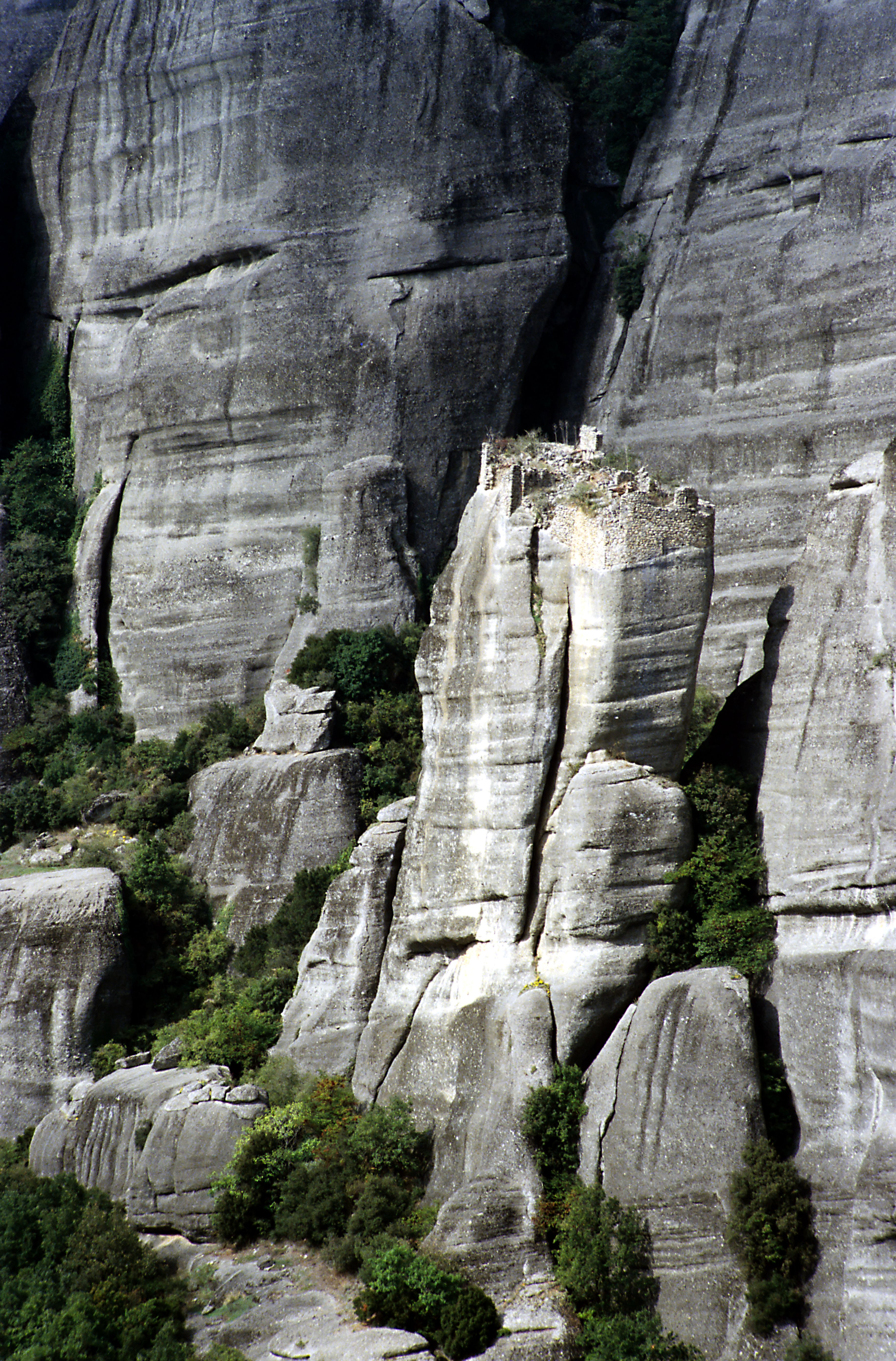

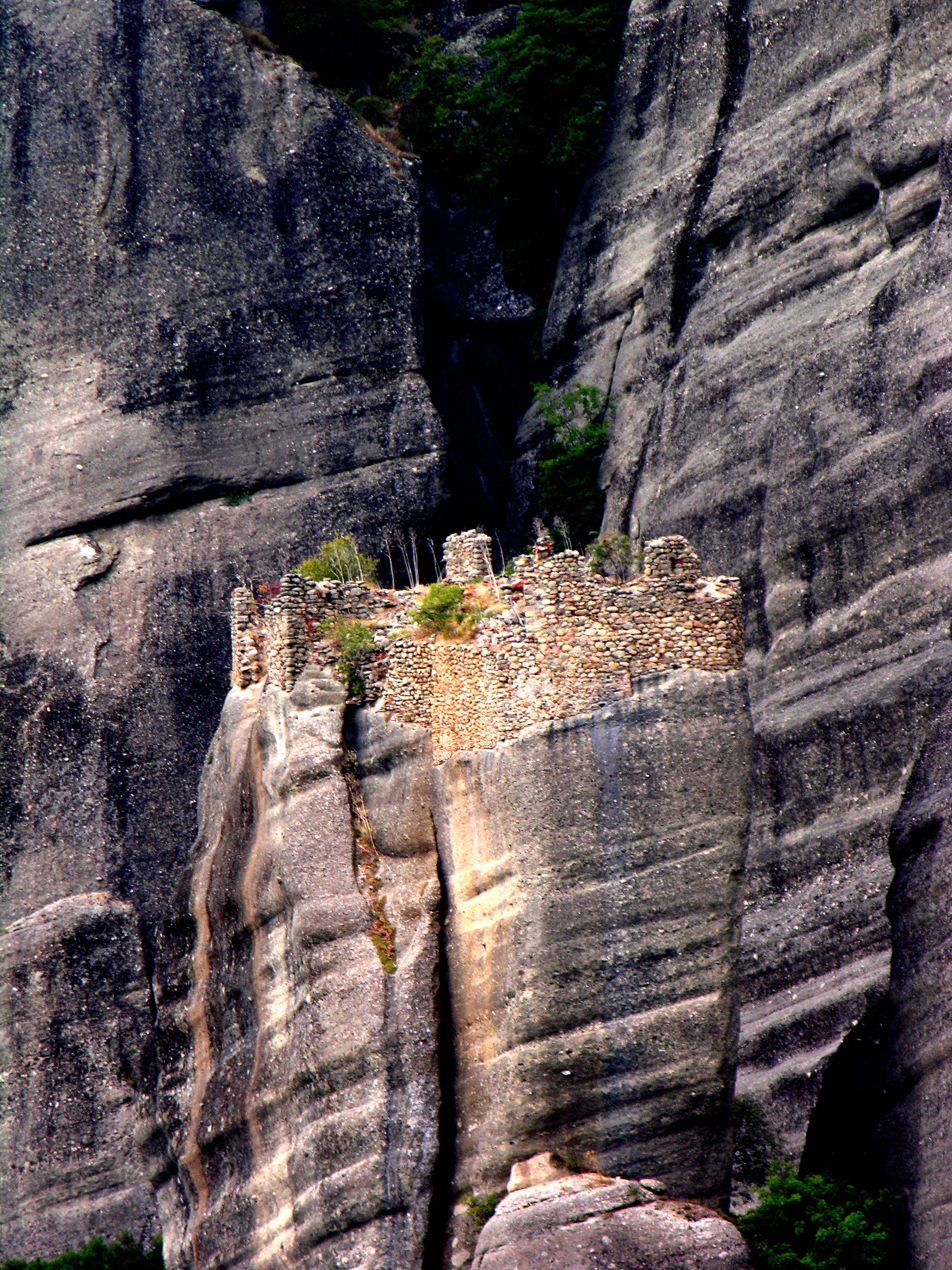

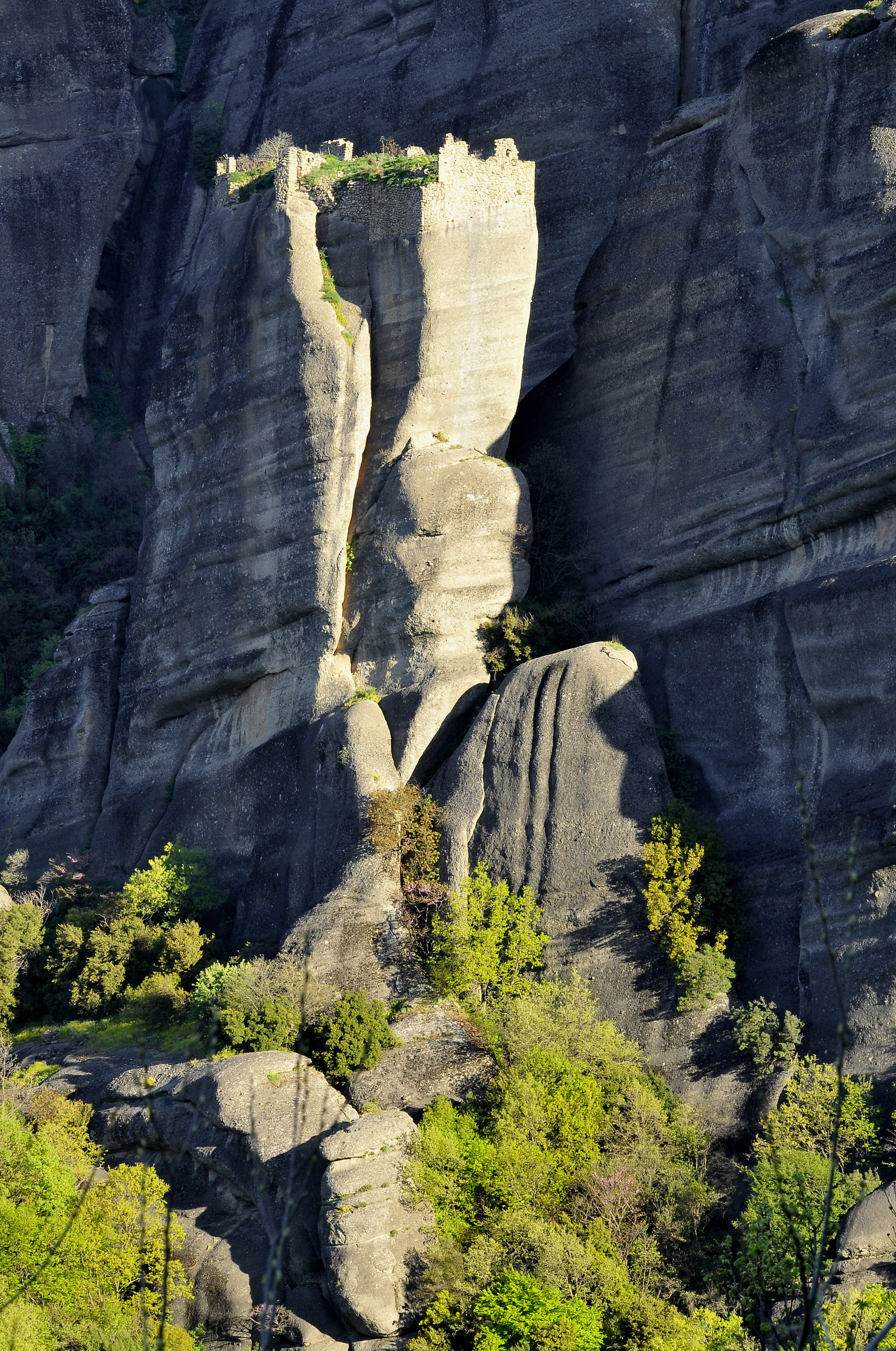

== See also ==
- Church of Greece
- List of Greek Orthodox monasteries in Greece
