= Orthodox Church in America Stavropegial Institutions =

Institutions under the direct supervision of the Orthodox Church in America

The states where stavropegial institutions exist.

The Stavropegial Institutions are churches, monastic communities, and theological schools which are stauropegions of the Orthodox Church in America, meaning they are under the direct supervision of the Orthodox Church in America's primate. The Stavropegial Institutions are located in three states in the United States and one Canadian province – California, New York, Ontario, and Pennsylvania.

== Notable Stavropegial Institutions ==
- Saint Tikhon's Orthodox Theological Seminary – South Canaan Township, Pennsylvania
- Saint Vladimir's Orthodox Theological Seminary – Crestwood, New York
- New Skete
  - Companions of New Skete, Cambridge, NY
  - Monks of New Skete, Cambridge, NY
  - Nuns of New Skete, Cambridge, NY
- Three Hierarchs Chapel, Crestwood, NY
- Holy Myrrhbearer's Monastery, Otego, NY
- St. Sergius of Radonezh, Oyster Bay Cove, NY
- St. Tikhon of Zadonsk Monastery, South Canaan, PA
- Protection of the Most Holy Theotokos Monastery, Weaverville

== See also ==
- Stauropegic
