= Peter L'Huillier =

Paul L'Huillier (December 3, 1926, Paris, France – November 19, 2007, Bronxville, New York) was a prominent scholar and the archbishop of the Orthodox Church in America's Diocese of New York and New Jersey.

== Biography ==
Paul L'Huillier converted to Eastern Orthodoxy in 1945 while enrolled at St. Denys Institute in Paris. On August 30, 1954, he was tonsured as a monk and took the name of "Peter". On September 4 and 5, 1954, he was ordained hierodeacon and hieromonk by Archbishop Boris (Vik), Exarch of the Russian Patriarchate in Europe. In 1960, L'Huillier was elevated to the rank of archimandrite.

On September 12, 1968, L'Huillier was consecrated Bishop of Chersonesus (Patriarchal Exarchate in Western Europe). In 1979 he was invited to serve in the Orthodox Church in America by Metropolitan Theodosius (Lazor). L'Huillier accepted and was installed as Bishop of Brooklyn that year. Two years later, he succeeded Metropolitan Theodosius as Bishop of New York and New Jersey. In 1990 he was elevated to the rank of archbishop.

The author of several books, L'Huillier's final volume spurred some disagreements in Orthodox circles. Published by St. Vladimir's Press, it urged the Orthodox Churches to adopt the Western Christian calculation of Easter, aka Paschalion. This has been a controversial topic for some time in Eastern Orthodox discourse. Some critics of the book emphasized that only the Eastern Paschalion holds to the Nicene Council's 4th century prohibition on celebrating the resurrection before the Jewish Passover. Some argued that abandonment of that stipulation could even imply a subtle subtext of antisemitism, since it would further decouple the connection between Christianity and Judaism. This criticism is made on both historical and contemporary grounds, the latter because Western Christianity annually ignores contemporary Jews' calculation of Passover.

Subsequent to L'Huillier's retirement from the episcopate in 2005, the Diocese of New York and New Jersey was combined with the Diocese of Washington (D.C.) to create the Diocese of Washington and New York.

Both during his episcopate and subsequent to his retirement, L'Huillier taught canon law at Saint Vladimir's Orthodox Theological Seminary.

L'Huillier died in Bronxville, New York on November 19, 2007. He was buried at St. Tikhon's Monastery in South Canaan, Pennsylvania.

== Episcopal succession ==
Eastern Orthodox Church titles
Preceded by Nicholas (Yeryomin)	Bishop of Chersonese; 1968–1979	Succeeded by Valentine (Mischuk)
Preceded by John (Shahovskoy)	Bishop of Brooklyn; 1979–1981	Succeeded by vacant
Preceded by Theodosius (Lazor)	Archbishop of New York and New Jersey; 1981–2005	Succeeded by Herman (Swaiko)
