= Michael Dahulich =

American archbishop

Michael The Most Reverend
- Archbishop of New York and New Jersey
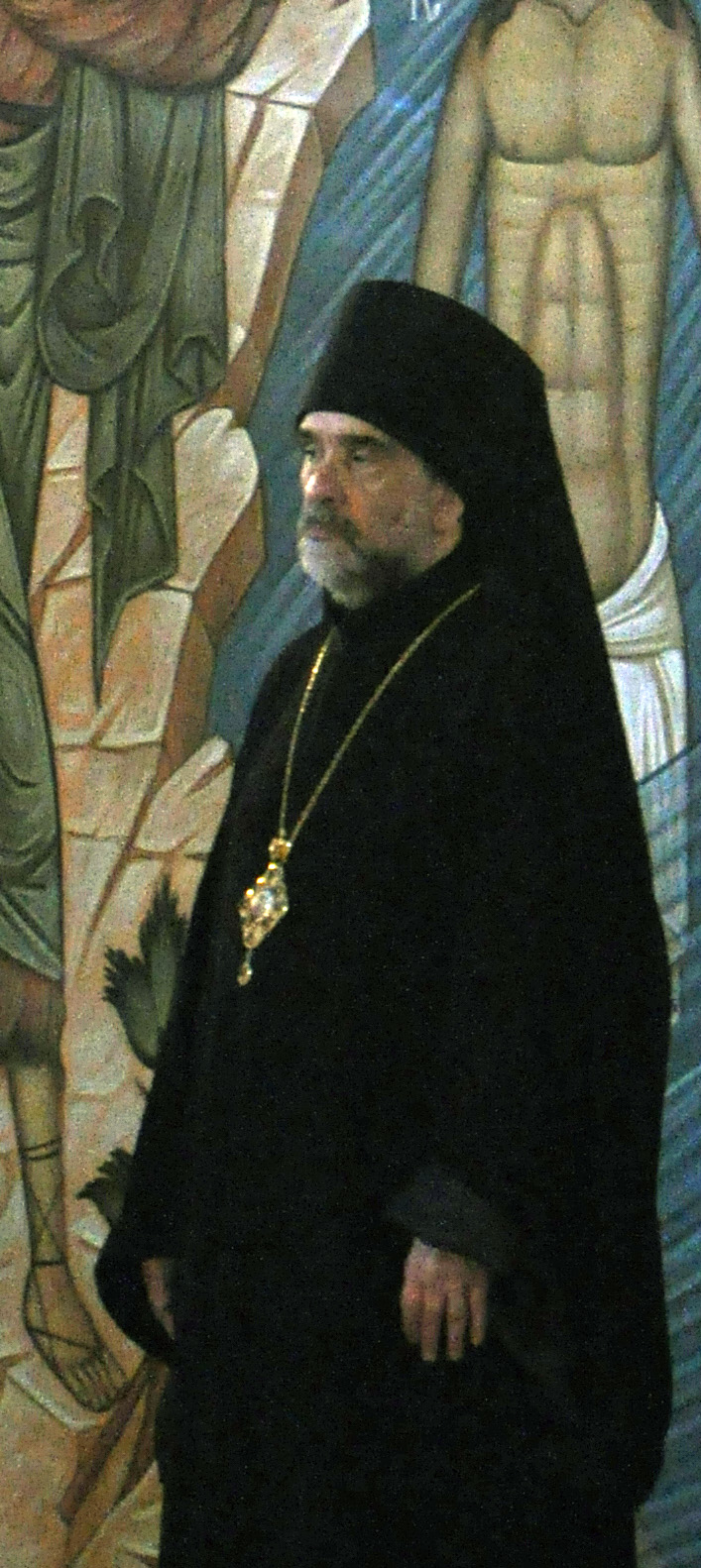
- Archdiocese: New York and New Jersey
- See: New York City
- Installed: May 9, 2010
- Term ended: Incumbent
- Predecessor: Position Established

Orders
- Ordination: 1973
- Consecration: May 8, 2010

Personal details
- Born: August 25, 1950 (age 76) Johnson City, New York
- Denomination: Eastern Orthodox
- Education: Christ the Saviour Seminary; Saint Vincent College

Archbishop Michael (Dahulich) is an Orthodox archbishop in the Orthodox Church in America Diocese of New York and New Jersey. He is the former dean of St. Tikhon's Orthodox Theological Seminary in South Canaan, Pennsylvania, and serves there as Rector and Associate Professor of New Testament and Ethics.

Michael entered the clergy through the American Carpatho-Russian Orthodox Diocese, being ordained to the priesthood by Bishop John (Martin) in 1973. He served as Vice-Chancellor and as secretary to two bishops. He also was Director of Religious Education of the Johnstown deanery and taught at the Christ the Saviour Seminary.

Michael joined the faculty of St. Tikhon's Orthodox Theological Seminary in South Canaan in 1994.

Michael earned a B.Th. in Theology from Christ the Saviour Seminary in Johnstown, Pennsylvania; a B.A. in Philosophy from St. Vincent College in Latrobe, Pennsylvania; and an M.A. and Ph.D. in Theology from Duquesne University in Pittsburgh. He is also studying Business at Villanova University.

On September 22, 2009, Michael was elected as the bishop of OCA's newly reconstituted Diocese of New York and New Jersey. On October 24 of that year, he was tonsured a rassophore monk by Metr. Jonah at St. Tikhon's Orthodox Monastery in preparation for his consecration to the episcopacy.

On December 15, 2009, by a decision of the Holy Synod, Michael was appointed administrator of the Diocese of New York and New Jersey, a position he assumed effective January 1, 2010, allowing him to begin assuming the everyday running of the diocese, pending his consecration, which took place on May 8, 2010, in Ss. Peter and Paul Orthodox Church in Jersey City, New Jersey.

== Life ==
The son of Ann (Rosics) and the late Peter Dahulich, Michael was born in Johnson City, N.Y., on August 29, 1950. He grew up in Binghamton, N.Y., and has one brother, retired US Air Force Captain George Dahulich, who presently works for Lockheed Martin and lives in Centreville, Va.; and a sister, Barbara Knighton, who lives in Binghamton and works as a secretary at the State University of New York at Binghamton.

He was baptized in the Orthodox faith as an infant at St. Michael's Church in Binghamton, where his parents had been married in 1948. His father was a convert from the Byzantine Catholic Church, and his mother was Orthodox.

From the age of ten until he graduated from college and went to Seminary, Michael served as an altar boy under the tutelage of his pastor, Fr. Stephen Dutko.

He attended Binghamton Central High School in 1967. His senior paper was a biography of Ecumenical Patriarch Athenagoras. He graduated two years later from Broome Community College, and attended Christ the Saviour Seminary in Johnstown. He completed his theological studies there in December 1972, having been mentored by Bishop John of Nyssa.

While a student at the Seminary, he met Deborah Sandak, a parishioner of Christ the Saviour Cathedral in Johnstown. They were engaged on the Feast of the Protection of the Theotokos in 1972 and were married on January 21, 1973 in the Johnstown Cathedral.

=== Episcopate ===
He was ordained by Bishop John, first to the Diaconate on February 3, 1973, in St. Peter the Apostle Chapel in Johnstown; and then to the Holy Priesthood the following day, in Christ the Saviour Cathedral.

Father Michael assumed his first parish assignment at SS. Peter and Paul Church in Homer City, Pa., a small mission community which had never had a full-time priest, on Sunday, February 18, 1973. Two days later, en route to dinner at his best friend’s home in Jenners, Pa., he and his wife were in a car accident; she was killed instantly, and he was hospitalized for three months.

In June 1973 he returned to serve the Homer City parish, while living at Christ the Saviour Seminary. Bishop John decided it best for him to pursue further studies after the stress of his wife's death, reasoning that he "did best in the classroom". The bishop applied for Michael's admission and funded his education personally.

Over the next few years, Michael attended St. Vincent College in Latrobe, Pa., graduating with a degree in philosophy, and Duquesne University in Pittsburgh, graduating with a Master of Arts in Theology and later a Ph.D. in Theology, with a concentration in New Testament studies.

Upon his graduation from St. Vincent College, he was named Prefect of Student Life at Christ the Saviour Seminary, a position he held for five years, until SS. Peter and Paul Church achieved parish status, and Michael became its first full-time pastor. He was assigned as instructor of Ethics at the Seminary, where he also taught Scripture and Homiletics, until he was transferred from the area in 1985. During his Ph.D. studies at Duquesne, he was also adjunct lecturer, teaching Scripture and Eastern Orthodoxy in the Theology Department at the university.

For nearly 13 years Michael served SS. Peter and Paul Church, during which time it grew from 60 to more than 130 members, and from mission to parish status. The church building was brick-encased, its interior was decorated, and a rectory was built in this period.

During that time Michael also served as religious education director for the Johnstown Deanery and as associate editor of The Church Messenger. In 1982 he was elevated to the rank of archpriest, and named vice-chancellor of the diocese. In addition, until Bishop John's death in 1984, Michael served as his personal secretary.

He continued as vice-chancellor and secretary to Bishop Nicholas of Amissos, until December 1985, when he was transferred to Holy Ghost Church in Phoenixville, Pennsylvania, where he served as pastor for 16 years. During that time, the parish grew from 256 to nearly 450 members, including more than 100 children. Several improvements in the temple and the 20-acre facility were undertaken, and more than half a million dollars was raised toward the building of a new educational facility. A pre-school and day care was established, with the intent to grow into an Orthodox school.

During that time, Michael was also named to the Study and Planning Commission and the Ecumenical Commission of the Standing Conference of the Canonical Orthodox Bishops in the Americas (SCOBA). He served for more than a decade as the dean of the Mid-Atlantic Deanery parishes of the Carpatho-Russian Diocese, and vice-chairman of the Harvest 2000 Committee on Missions, Evangelization and Diocesan Growth. He also edited the Diocesan Prayerbook, Come To Me.

He was named protopresbyter in 1998 by the Ecumenical Patriarchate, and elevated to that rank by Metropolitan Nicholas of Amissos, in his parish in Phoenixville.

In 1993, Michael was asked by Archbishop Herman to teach at St. Tikhon’s Seminary, where he has served on the faculty to this day. In 2001 he was released from the Carpatho-Russian Diocese to the Orthodox Church in America, and came to serve full-time at St. Tikhon’s Seminary, first as Administrative Dean (2001–2002) and then as Dean (2002–present). His field of expertise in teaching is New Testament, and he has also taught Old Testament courses, Homiletics, Pastoral Theology, and Ethics at St. Tikhon’s.

Michael was part of the team that earned national accreditation for the seminary from the Association of Theological Schools in the United States and Canada. He helped work on a revision of the curriculum for the Master of Divinity program, and served as editor of the Tikhonaire; The Spirit of St. Tikhon's; By the Waters; and St. Tikhon's Theological Journal. He also works as director of recruitment, development and fund-raising at the school.

Also during this time, he served as a member of the Board of Theological Education of the Orthodox Church in America, OCA Representative to the National Advisory Board of the American Bible Society, a member (and former national secretary) of the Orthodox Theological Society of America, and a member of the advisory board of the Orthodox Christian Association of Medicine, Psychology and Religion (OCAMPR).

During his deanship scholarships for deserving students and assistance for married students and their families have been provided.

Michael has published a number of articles in theological journals, magazines and newspapers. He has had a recurring column in The Orthodox Herald on “Sobornost.” He has presented several papers, delivered numerous talks, lectures, and keynote addresses, and led many seminars and retreats in schools and parishes throughout the country, as well as teaching week-long seminars in Scripture in both Brazil and India.

On August 24, 2009, Father Michael was selected as a nominee for Bishop of the Diocese of New York and New Jersey, by clergy and lay delegates at a Special Diocesan Assembly. On September 22, the Holy Synod of Bishops of the Orthodox Church in America elected him to the episcopacy, for the Diocese of New York and New Jersey.

Michael was tonsured as a Riasophor Monk on October 23, 2009 at St. Tikhon's Monastery Church by Metropolitan Jonah. He was then tonsured into the Lesser Schema at the Monastery Church on Holy Tuesday, March 30, 2010, by Jonah. The following day he was elevated to the rank of Archimandrite and awarded the mitre by the Metropolitan. Michael was consecrated to the episcopacy on May 8, 2010 in the Orthodox Church of St. Peter and Paul, Jersey City, New Jersey.

Eastern Orthodox Church titles
Preceded by Jonah (Paffhausen) (interim)	Bishop of New York and New Jersey; 2010 – Present	Succeeded by Incumbent
