= Kiprian Borisevich =

Bishop of the Orthodox Church of America

Archbishop Kiprian (secular name Boris Pavlovich Borisevich, Russian: Борис Павлович Борисевич, Polish: Borys Borisewicz; August 15, 1903 - December 14, 1980) was bishop of the Orthodox Church in America, archbishop of Philadelphia and Eastern Pennsylvania from 1964 until his death.

== Life ==
Boris Borisevich was born on 15 August 1903, in Kholm, Russian Empire (now Chełm, Poland). He attended school in Kremenets, graduating in 1916. He then pursued studies at the Theological Seminary in Volyn, in then eastern Poland, from which he graduated in 1925. After graduating from the seminary, Boris continued his education, studying at the Orthodox Theological Faculty of the University of Warsaw.

Boris married in 1927. 12 February 1928 he was ordained a deacon, three days later he ordained priest by Bishop Simon (Ivanovsky) of Kremenets and being appointed to a parish in the village of Lopusho, diocese of Volyn.

In 1929 Father Borisevich graduated from the Theological Department (Faculty) in Warsaw, and in 1931 upon completion of his thesis on "St. Kiprian, his life and his works," he received the degree of Master of Theology.

In November 1929, Fr. Boris was appointed Supervisor of Religious Education (законоучитель) in the Secondary Schools in Grodno, which position he held until March 1939. During this period he held the positions of Diocesan missioner and sacristan of the cathedral.

In March 1939, he was transferred to Vilno as Supervisor of Religious Education and held that position until May 1940, when by the decree of the government the Lithuanian Soviet Socialist Republic religious training in public schools was abolished.

In 1942, he was appointed Sacristan of the Cathedral in Kovno and held that position to the time of his evacuation to Austria in July 1944 with his wife. In Austria, Fr. Boris organized a parish in the town of Linz on the Danube. In 1945, he evacuated to Bavaria and organized a parish in Augsburg. He was pastor of the parish until 1949. During this time in Bavaria he was also a member of the Bishop's Council, having been elected by the Diocesan Assembly; he was also president of the Eparchial Missionary Committee and Vice President of the Building Committee for the restoration church in Stuttgart.

Fr. Boris and his wife arrived in the United States in July 1949, and he began serving parishes of the Metropolia (now Orthodox Church in America). The first assignment of Fr. Boris in the United States was the Holy Trinity parish in Kansas City, Kansas (1950–1953).

From 1953 to 1959 he was pastor of Saint Andrew Church in Baltimore, Maryland, and at the same time Dean of the Washington, D.C. District.

In September 1959, he was appointed to Holy Assumption Church in Stamford, Connecticut. He was also appointed to the Metropolitan Board of Censors, and to be the compiler and editor of the Church Calendar with the liturgical rubrics, and also he became the editor of the Russian American Orthodox Messenger, the official organ of the Metropolia

On June 23, 1961, Fr. Boris became a widower. On October 6 of same year took the monastic vows and was tonsured by the name of Kiprian by Archbishop Irenaeus (Bekish) of Boston and New England

== Episcopate ==
The Sobor of Bishops elected him Bishop of Washington, D.C. and suffragan to the Metropolitan with residence in St. Tikhon's Monastery, South Canaan, Pennsylvania. Bishop Kiprian was also Rector of St. Tikhon's Seminary in South Canaan.

Subsequently, in 1964 Bp. Kiprian was elected Bishop of Philadelphia and Pennsylvania. In 1970, Bp. Kiprian was elevated to Archbishop and served as a member of the Lesser Synod of Bishops and as chairman of the Department of External Affairs.

In 1970, he was elevated to the dignity of Archbishop and served as a member of the Lesser Synod of Bishops and Chairman of the Department of External Affairs.

On December 14, 1980, he reposed in the Lord. He was buried at St. Tikhon's Monastery in South Canaan, Pennsylvania.

== Sources ==
This article incorporates text from Kiprian (Borisevich) of Philadelphia at OrthodoxWiki which is licensed under the CC-BY-SA and GFDL.
