= Orthodox Church in America Diocese of the West =

Diocese of the Orthodox Church in America

Diocese of the West

orthodox

Location
- Country: United States
- Territory: West United States
- Metropolitan: Tikhon (Mollard)
- Headquarters: San Francisco

Statistics
- Parishes: 69

Information
- Denomination: Eastern Orthodox
- Language: English, Church Slavonic, Russian, Ukrainian

Current leadership
- Parent church: Orthodox Church in America
- bishop: Vasily (Permiakov)

Map
- The states in which the Diocese of the West has jurisdiction.

Website
- dowoca.org

The Diocese of the West is a diocese of the Orthodox Church in America (OCA). Its territory includes parishes, monasteries, and missions located in eight states in the Western United States – Arizona, California, Colorado, Hawaii, Montana, Nevada, Oregon, and Washington. The diocesan chancery is located in Los Angeles, California.

Its current bishop, Benjamin (Peterson), was installed on October 2, 2007. He replaced Herman (Swaiko), who was also the OCA's ruling primate. Metr. Herman had served as the locum tenens of the diocese of San Francisco, Los Angeles and the West since the retirement of Bishop Tikhon (Fitzgerald) in November 2006. During a special diocesan assembly held on January 31, 2007, Bishop Benjamin of Berkeley was unanimously nominated to replace Bishop Tikhon as Diocesan Hierarch. Bishop Benjamin's name was submitted to the Holy Synod of Bishops of the OCA, who elected him as Hierarch during their spring session on March 20, 2007.

Bishop Benjamin had served as Chancellor of the Diocese of the West since January 2004, and had been the temporary Administrator of the diocese since Bishop Tikhon's retirement.

== Deaneries ==
The diocese is grouped geographically into six deaneries, each consisting of a number of parishes. Each deanery is headed by a parish priest, known as a dean. The deans coordinate activities in their area's parishes, and report to the diocesan bishop. The current deaneries of the Diocese of the West and their territories are:

- Missionary District – Arizona, California, Hawaii, Montana, Oregon, and Washington
- San Francisco Russian Missionary District Deanery – California
- Pacific Central Deanery – California
- Pacific Northwest Deanery – Oregon and Washington
- Pacific Southwest Deanery – Arizona, California, and Nevada
- Rocky Mountain Deanery – Colorado

== Bishops ==
- Apollinarius (Koshevoy) (1926-1927)
- Alexius (Panteleyev) (1927-1931)
- Theophilus (Pashkovsky) (1931-1950)
- John (Shahovskoy) (1950-1972)
- Vladimir (Nagosky) (1972-1975) locum tenens
- John (Shahovskoy) (1975-1979)
- Basil (Rodzianko) (1980-1984)
- Boris (Geeza) (1984-1987) locum tenens
- Tikhon (Fitzgerald) (1987-2007)
- Benjamin (Peterson) (2007-2025)
- Vasily (Permiakov) (since 2025)
