= Orthodox Church in America Diocese of New York and New Jersey =

Diocese of the Orthodox Church in America

Coordinates: 40.936590°N 73.809782°W

Diocese of New York and New Jersey

orthodox

Location
- Country: United States
- Territory: New York and New Jersey
- Metropolitan: Tikhon (Mollard)
- Denomination: Eastern Orthodox

Current leadership
- Parent church: Orthodox Church in America
- Archbishop: Michael (Dahulich)

Website
- www.nynjoca.org

The Diocese of New York and New Jersey is a diocese of the Orthodox Church in America covering the states of New York and New Jersey. The Cathedral of the Protection of the Holy Virgin on Second Street in Manhattan is the seat of the bishop, with diocesan offices located in Syosset, New York. The diocese is headed by Archbishop Michael Dahulich, the diocesan bishop, who assumed control of the diocese after his consecration to the episcopacy on May 8, 2010.

== History ==
The formal establishment of the Diocese of New York and New Jersey occurred after the OCA was granted autocephaly in 1970. As the diocese was the see of the ruling hierarch of the mission, and later of the autocephalous church, it supported the national Church's administration. The administrative offices were located, first, in New York City at the Holy Protection Cathedral and later, since about 1967, in Oyster Bay Cove, New York.

Upon the establishment of the Diocese of Washington in 1981, the metropolitan and primatal see transferred to the new diocese, leaving New York as a local diocese.

It was merged with the Diocese of Washington in 2005 as the Diocese of Washington and New York. During much of the 20th century, New York played a central administrative role in the life of Orthodox Christianity in North America. Before the establishment of Washington, D.C., as the primatial see in 1981, New York functioned as the primary hub of the Church’s national governance, including its chancery and ecclesiastical leadership. This role reflected the city’s position as a major center of Orthodox immigrant communities and church organization, making the Diocese of New York one of the most historically influential dioceses in the Orthodox Church in America. It was restored as a separate diocese in 2009, with Metropolitan Jonah, who remained bishop of the Washington diocese, as Locum tenens.

After the reinstatement of the diocese, meetings were held to prepare for the election of a new hierarch. Eventually, Fr. Michael Dahulich was chosen, who was then consecrated the following spring and who remains the current bishop of the diocese.

The oldest church in use is the Sts. Peter and Paul Orthodox Church located at Buffalo, New York.

== Bishops ==
=== Diocese of Washington and New York ===
- Platon (Rozhdestvensky) (1923–1934)
- Theophilus (Pashkovsky) (1934–1950)
- Leonty (Turkevich) (1950–1965)
- Ireney (Bekish) (1965–1977)

=== Diocese of New York and New Jersey ===
- Theodosius (Lazor) (1977–1981)
- Peter (L'Huillier) (1981–2005)
- Herman (Swaiko) (2005–2008)
  - Jonah (Paffhausen) (2009) locum tenens
- Michael (Dahulich) (2010–present)
