= Mark Maymon =

The Right Reverend Archbishop Mark
- Philadelphia and Eastern Pennsylvania
- Diocese: Diocese of Eastern Pennsylvania

Orders
- Ordination: September 7, 1997 (Holy Priesthood)
- Consecration: December 5, 2004

Personal details
- Born: Alan Maymon; June 22, 1958 (age 68) New Albany, Indiana, U.S.
- Denomination: Orthodox Church in America
- Occupation: Archbishop
- Education: Oral Roberts University

Bishop Mark of Philadelphia, secular name Mark Alan Maymon (born June 22, 1958) is an archbishop of the Orthodox Church in America and the current Archbishop of Philadelphia and Eastern Pennsylvania.

Formerly a diocesan bishop of the see of Toledo and the Midwest in the Antiochian Orthodox Christian Archdiocese of North America, Maymon was received into the OCA after his release by Metropolitan Philip Saliba.

== Life ==
Born in New Albany, Indiana, on June 22, 1958, and baptized in the Roman Catholic Church. He later became a Pentecostal Christian, attending an Assembly of God church in Louisville, Kentucky. He attended Oral Roberts University in Tulsa, Oklahoma, and for a period of time before his conversion to the Orthodox Church taught Old Testament studies there. He later attended St. Vladimir's Orthodox Theological Seminary in Crestwood, New York, where he earned a M. Div. degree.

While serving as a subdeacon at St. George Antiochian Cathedral, in Oakland, Pennsylvania, he worked in mental health. Later, he was ordained a deacon and priest by Bishop Antoun Khouri in the Antiochian Archdiocese to serve the parish of St. John the Evangelist Antiochian Orthodox Church in Beaver Falls, Pennsylvania. He later served at St. George Antiochian Orthodox Church in Grand Rapids, Michigan, before he was elected bishop by the local synod of the Antiochian Archdiocese and consecrated in Damascus on December 5, 2004, by Ignatius IV of Antioch.

Maymon was enthroned at the cathedral of St. George in Toledo, Ohio, on August 25, 2005, by Metropolitan Philip Saliba, succeeding Bishop Demetri (Khoury). His see included Iowa, Illinois, Indiana, Kentucky, Michigan, Minnesota, Missouri, Ohio, and Wisconsin and oversaw around 50 parishes and missions.

October 22, 2010 at Local Synod of the Antiochian Orthodox Christian Archdiocese majority of the bishops of the synod decided that the best thing was to transfer Bishop Mark to the Diocese of Eagle River and the Northwest, but Bishop Mark said he could not live in that part of the country and subsequently requested to be released to the Orthodox Church in America. This was also after Metropolitan Philip had demoted the bishops from full diocesan bishops back to auxiliary bishops below the Metropolitan. On December 8, 2010, Metropolitan Philip (Saliba) granted a canonical release to Bishop Mark to enter the canonical jurisdiction of the Orthodox Church in America. Bishop Mark was appointed Auxiliary to OCA Primate Metropolitan Jonah Paffhausen with the title “Bishop of Baltimore” and administrator the OCA Diocese of the South; effective since January 1, 2011.

November 13, 2012, he was appointed administrator of the Diocese of Philadelphia and Eastern Pennsylvania. On March 18, 2014, he was elected by the members of the Holy Synod of Bishops of the Orthodox Church in America to fill the vacant Episcopal See of Philadelphia and Eastern Pennsylvania. He was installed on May 10, 2014, in Saint Stephen Cathedral, Philadelphia.

He was elevated to the rank of Archbishop on Friday, March 20, 2015, at the Holy Synod of Bishops in Syosset, NY.

Eastern Orthodox Church titles
Preceded by Michael (Shaheen)	Bishop of Toledo and the Midwest (Antiochian); 2004 – 2010	Succeeded by Anthony (Michaels)
Preceded by Melchisedek (Pleska) locum tenens	Archbishop of Philadelphia and Eastern Pennsylvania (OCA); 2015 - Present	Succeeded by Incumbent
