= Sts. Peter and Paul Orthodox Church =

Historic church in New York, United States

- U.S. National Register of Historic Places
- U.S. Historic district
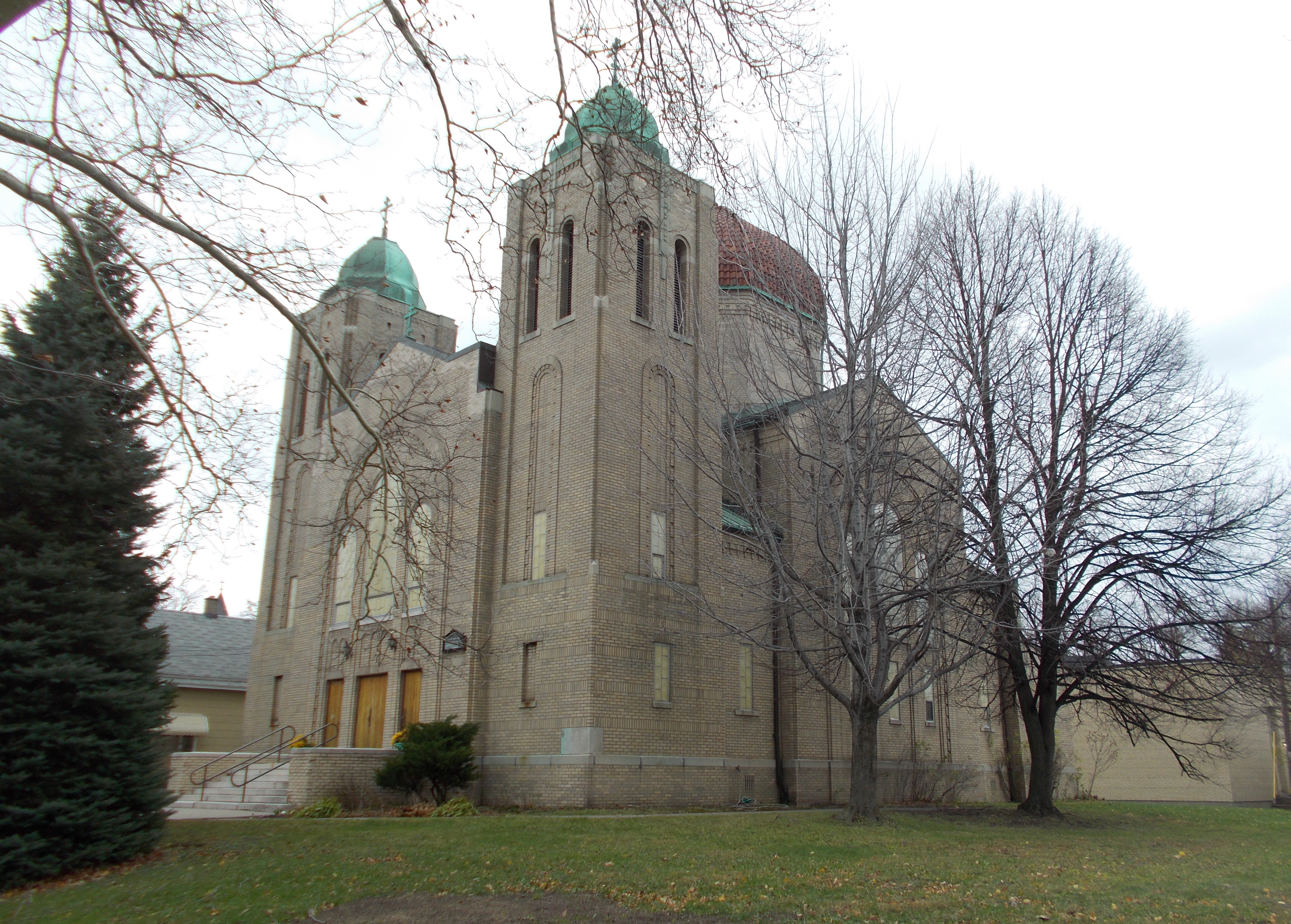
- Sts. Peter and Paul Orthodox Church, November 2015

- Location within New York Location within the United States
- Location: 40 Benzinger St., Buffalo, New York
- Coordinates: 42°53′10″N 78°48′25″W
- Area: 0.76 acres (0.31 ha)
- Built: c. 1912, 1932; 1933; 1948; 1964-1965
- Architect: Joseph E. Fronczak (church arch.); Robert Zinter (parish hall); Nicholas Zadorozhny (muralist)
- Architectural style: Byzantine Revival
- NRHP reference No.: 15000513
- Added to NRHP: August 10, 2015

Sts. Peter and Paul Orthodox Church, also known as Sts. Peter and Paul Russian Orthodox Church is a historic church complex and national historic district located in the Lovejoy neighborhood of Buffalo, Erie County, New York. The complex was built between 1912 and 1965 and consists of the yellow brick Byzantine Revival style, roughly 2-story church (designed in 1932 by architect Joseph E. Fronczak), a 1-story parish hall (designed in 1964 by Robert Zinter), a 2-story frame house that serves as a rectory (c. 1912), and a frame garage (c. 1912). The church has a cross-in-square type plan, and the front facade features two 3-story towers. It is the oldest Orthodox church in Buffalo and oldest in use in the Orthodox Diocese of New York and New Jersey.

It was listed on the National Register of Historic Places in 2015.
