= Basil Rodzianko =

Bishop of the Orthodox Church in America

His Grace Basil
- Bishop of San Francisco and the West
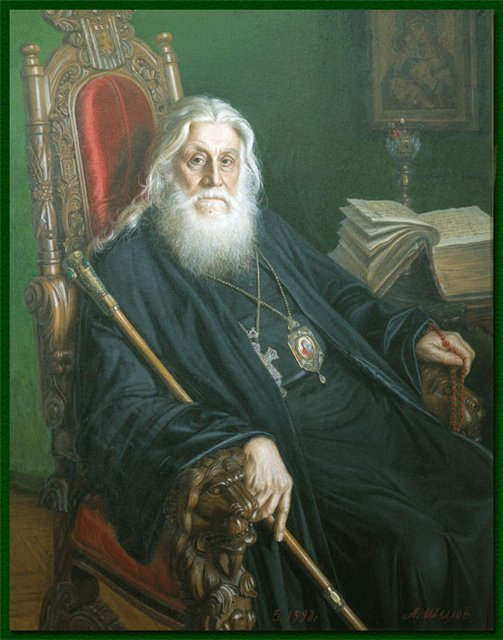
- Portrait of Bishop Basil (Rodzianko) by Aleksandr Maksovich Shilov
- Native name: Владимир Михайлович Родзянко
- See: San Francisco
- Installed: 1 November 1980
- Term ended: 25 April 1984
- Predecessor: Vladimir (Nagosky)
- Successor: Tikhon (Fitzgerald)
- Previous post: Bishop of Washington (1980)

Orders
- Ordination: 1940
- Consecration: 1980

Personal details
- Born: Vladimir Mikhaylovich Rodzianko; 22 May 1915 Otrada (near Popasna, Ukraine)
- Died: 17 September 1999 (aged 84) Washington DC, US
- Buried: Rock Creek Cemetery in Washington DC
- Denomination: Russian Orthodox
- Spouse: Maria Kolyubaeva (m. 1937; died 1978)
- Children: 1
- Occupation: Orthodox Christian priest, bishop, and apologist
- Education: University of Belgrade

Bishop Basil (Russian: Епископ Василий), secular name Vladimir Mikhaylovich Rodzianko (Russian: Владимир Михайлович Родзянко 22 May 1915 - 17 September 1999) was a bishop serving the Orthodox Church in America from 1980 to 1999.

As a priest, he was imprisoned by the Communist Party in Yugoslavia. With the help of friends in the United Kingdom, including the Archbishop of Canterbury, Vladimir was released. Later, as a bishop, he became a spokesperson for Orthodox Christianity with an international radio audience. Rodzianko's 1996 book The Theory of the Big Bang and the Faith of the Holy Fathers (or Теория распада вселенной и вера Oтцов) defended a meta-historical fall and argued that the fall and exile of the first humans from paradise resulted in the Big Bang and the formation of our current universe.

== Early life ==
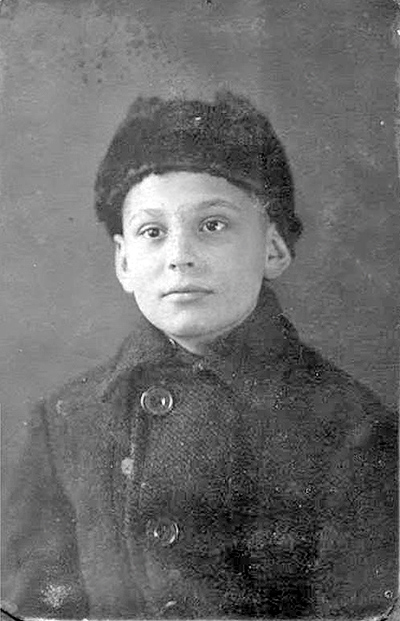
Vladimir Rodzianko in 1926 when he was 11 (Belgrade, Serbia, Yugoslavia).

He was born on May 22, 1915, in the family estate of Otrada, which was located near the village of Popasnoye in Novomoskovsky Uyezd, Yekaterinoslav Governorate. His father, Mikhail Rodzianko (1884–1956), was a graduate of Moscow University, while his grandfather, Mikhail Rodzianko, was chairman of the 3rd and 4th State Duma of the Russian Empire. This relationship played an extremely important role in the fate of the future Bishop Basil. Vladimir's mother is Elizaveta Rodzianko, born Baroness Meyendorff (1883–1985). Protopresbyter John Meyendorff was his second cousin on his mother's side.

In 1920, Rodziankos were forced to leave Russia and settle in the Kingdom of Serbs, Croats and Slovenes, first in Pančevo, then in Beodra (now Novo Miloševo, Vojvodina), where his grandfather died. In 1925 to 1933 Vladimir studied at the 1st Russian-Serbian Classical Gymnasium in Belgrade; he enjoyed the special patronage of Metropolitan Anthony (Khrapovitsky), with whom he was distantly related. In 1926, he met hieromonk John (Maximovich), who had a huge spiritual influence on him. In 1933 to 1937 he studied at the Faculty of Theology of the University of Belgrade and graduated with a PhD in Theology. At that time, he and his family members were being cared for by priests who were under the jurisdiction of Russian Orthodox Church Outside of Russia. In August 1937, after completing his education at the Faculty of theology, he married Maria Kolyubaeva, the daughter of a priest who managed to leave the USSR illegally with his family.

== Bishop ==
In 1937 to 1939, with the blessing of the hierarchy of the Serbian Orthodox Church, having received a scholarship from the Church of England, Rodzianko continued his postgraduate studies at the University of London, where he studied Western faiths and theology, wrote a dissertation "The Most Holy Trinity and Its image - humanity". During his postgraduate studies, he met an Englishman, Archimandrite Nicholas (Gibbes), a former teacher of the Nicholas II children, and took part in the activities of the Fellowship of Saint Alban and Saint Sergius. After receiving his diploma in 1939, he was invited to Oxford to give a course of lectures on Russian theology. However, this was prevented by the outbreak of the World War II. Interned for some time in the UK, Vasily Rodzianko returned to Yugoslavia in early 1940.

Returning to Yugoslavia, he taught the Law of God at the Serbian-Hungarian school in Novi Sad. On March 30, 1941, at the Russian Holy Trinity Church in Belgrade, Patriarch Gabriel of Serbia ordained him a priest and appointed to the Serbian parish at the secondary school in Novi Sad; he also served in other Serbian and Russian rural parishes of the Diocese of Bačka. He had good relations with Bishop Irinej (Ćirić) of Bačka. After the Axis occupation of Vojvodina, the Orthodox inhabitants of the region, Serbs and Russians, were subjected to severe repression. The priest Vladimir Rodzianko took part in the Serbian resistance and rescued the Serbs from concentration camps, adopted an orphaned Ukrainian girl. The proposal to care one of the parts of the Russian Protective Corps in Yugoslavia, created with the blessing of Metropolitan Anastasius (Gribanovsky), was rejected by him, he tried not to take part in politics.

After Communist Party led by Josip Broz Tito came to power in the Yugoslavia, Russian emigrants began to leave to other countries, many of them returned to the USSR. Some of the Russian clerics were transferred to the jurisdiction of the Serbian Orthodox Church. Vladimir, being a cleric of the Serbian Orthodox Church, remained in his parish, was a law teacher in Serbian secondary schools in Subotica and secretary of the Russian missionary council of the local branch of the Red Cross. Through this organization, he helped people to travel to the West. After the death of Metropolitan Anthony (Khrapovitsky) Fr. Vladimir has largely revised his attitude to the ROCOR. On April 3, 1945, he sent a letter to the Patriarch of Moscow and All Russia Alexy I, in which he informed about his desire to serve the Russian Orthodox Church.

Due to the deterioration of relations between Yugoslavia and the USSR, persecution fell on the Russians who remained in the country. In July 1949 Fr. Vladimir, who cared two parishes, was arrested and sentenced to eight years of correctional labor for "illegal religious propaganda" (he was charged with a certificate of miraculous renewal of icons in his church). Sentenced to eight years hard labor, Fr. Vladimir was stripped of his cassock and cross and shared the hard prison life with his fellow prisoners, enduring with them a plague of fleas. While forbidden to perform any divine services, with the help of even the non-Orthodox prisoners, he was able to fulfill the requests of the Orthodox prisoners in "blessing of the waters" on Theophany.

=== Exile from Yugoslavia ===
Thanks to the personal petition of Archbishop Geoffrey Fisher of Canterbury to the Yugoslav authorities and the change in Tito's policy towards the West in 1951, Fr. Vladimir was released early from the camp and together with his family went to Paris, where his parents lived, who left Yugoslavia in 1946. In 1953, at the invitation of Bishop Nicholas (Velimirović), who was then living in London, Fr. Vladimir moved to the UK and became the second priest in the Cathedral of St. Sava of Serbia of the Western European Diocese of the SPC (Notting Hill district in London). He had friendly relations with the Serbian Royal House in exile. Fr. Vladimir was acquainted with many famous people, including Alexander Kerensky, whom he confessed during a serious illness.

Priest Vladimir joined the BBC Russian Service. In 1955, at his suggestion, religious radio broadcasting was opened to the USSR and Eastern Europe; these broadcasts broadcast divine services for the Twelve Great Feasts from the Russian Dormition Cathedral in London, theological talks and sermons were heard, detailed information about the events of religious life in the world was given; the broadcasts became so popular that the management of the ВВС decided to make their weekly. Fr. Vladimir also preached on the radio of the Association "Slavic Bible", "Voice of Orthodoxy" in Paris and on the Vatican Radio. He taught theology at Oxford University at the St. Sergius Theological Institute in Paris, participated in various inter-Christian projects and events, and lectured on various theological issues through the Fellowship of Saint Alban and Saint Sergius. At age sixty-three, called to serve as a bishop in the United States after the death of his wife, Rodzianko accepted monastic tonsure from Metropolitan Anthony Bloom with the new name Basil. The research topics of Priest Vladimir concerned such issues as the doctrine of the Holy Trinity, the difference in approaches to understanding the exodus of the Holy Spirit in the Eastern and Western Churches, the doctrine of the Kingdom of Heaven, apologetics, the meaning of the Divine Liturgy, Russian spirituality, the place of prayer, especially Jesus prayer, in the life of a Christian, creation and evolution, creativity of Fyodor Dostoevsky, the Shroud of Turin, etc.

The effectiveness of his broadcasts made him a target of the Soviet KGB. This attention would bring tragedy to the family when his teenage grandson was killed in an assassination attempt upon Fr. Vladimir's life. This tragedy was followed by the death of his wife, Maria, in 1978.

Then, on January 12, 1980, after his arrival in the United States, Hieromonk Basil was consecrated Bishop of Washington as auxiliary to Metropolitan Theodosius (Lazor), the primate of the OCA.

== Life in America ==
On November 1, 1980, Bishop Basil became Bishop of the Diocese of San Francisco and West. He served the San Francisco diocese until his retirement on April 25, 1984, which was forced as a result of what Archimandrite Tikhon (Shevkunov) has described in his chapter on the bishop's life in his book Everyday Saints as opposition to him by a clique within the jurisdiction. Yet his stature within world Orthodoxy only continued to grow.

=== Later life and retirement ===
After his retirement Bp. Basil returned to Washington, DC where he again began his religious broadcasts to the Soviet Union. As conditions changed in Russia with the fall of the Bolshevik government Bp. Basil was able to present his broadcasts directly over the Russian radio and television facilities. Then, in May 1991, Patriarch Alexius asked Bp. Basil to lead a pilgrimage to the Holy Land to bring back to Russia for a celebration commemorating Ss. Cyril and Methodius the Holy Fire from the tomb of Christ that ignites each Pascha. Bishop Basil and his pilgrims returned, first stopping in Constantinople for the blessing of the Ecumenical Patriarch, then traveling through the countries of southeastern Europe where Cyril and Methodius preached arriving at the Dormition Cathedral in the Kremlin. After the Liturgy, the Patriarch with Bishop Basil led through the streets of Moscow a procession that had not been seen in Moscow for over seventy years.

Rodzianko's 1996 book The Theory of the Big Bang and the Faith of the Holy Fathers was written after almost half a year of study at the Holy Trinity Sergius Monastery and published in Russian. It defends a meta-historical fall and argues that the fall and exile of the first humans from paradise resulted in the Big Bang and the formation of our current universe. A brief portion of the book called "Modern Cosmology and Ancient Theology" was translated into English by Marilyn Swezey.

Bishop Basil remained active among the Orthodox of Washington DC, especially among the new Russian immigrants, until his death on September 17, 1999. He was 84 years old. He was buried at Rock Creek Cemetery in Washington, DC.

== Legacy ==
The Washington, DC–based Holy Archangels Foundation has held annual retreats focused on his legacy and commemorating his life and works, starting in 2010, and maintains a website about him.

The bestselling book Everyday Saints by Archimandrite Tikhon Shevkunov includes a chapter on him entitled "His Eminence the Novice."

Bp. Basil's apartment in Washington is maintained much as he left it, and faithful gather for services often at his home chapel there.

== Notes ==
Eastern Orthodox Church titles
Preceded by Vladimir (Nagosky)	Bishop of San Francisco and the West; 1980 – 1984	Succeeded by Tikhon (Fitzgerald)
