= Tikhon Mollard =

American Eastern Orthodox bishop

His Beatitude Tikhon
- Archbishop of Washington, Metropolitan of All America and Canada
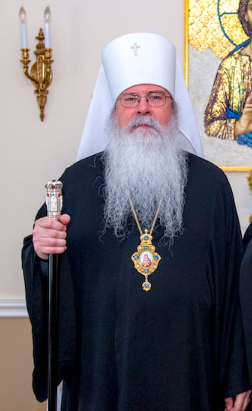
- Tikhon in 2025
- Church: Orthodox Church in America
- See: Washington
- Predecessor: Jonah (Paffhausen)
- Other posts: Senior Lecturer of Old Testament (St. Tikhon's Seminary), Deputy Abbot, St. Tikhon's Monastery
- Previous post: Archbishop of Philadelphia (2004–2012)

Orders
- Ordination: 1995
- Consecration: February 14, 2004

Personal details
- Born: Marc Raymond Mollard; July 15, 1966 (age 60) Boston, Massachusetts, United States
- Denomination: Eastern Orthodox Christianity
- Residence: Washington, D.C.
- Education: Saint Tikhon's Orthodox Theological Seminary

Metropolitan Tikhon (secular name: Marc Raymond Mollard; born July 15, 1966) is an Eastern Orthodox bishop and the Primate of the Orthodox Church in America, holding the title of Metropolitan of All America and Canada. Previously, he was the ruling bishop of Philadelphia and Eastern Pennsylvania. He was elected as Primate of the Orthodox Church in America on November 13, 2012, at the 17th All-American Council in Parma, Ohio.

== Life ==
=== Childhood and education ===
Marc Raymond Mollard was born in Boston, Massachusetts, on July 15, 1966, the oldest of three children born to Francois and Elizabeth Mollard. He was reared in the Episcopal Church.

After brief periods living in Connecticut, France, and Missouri, he and his family settled in Reading, Pennsylvania, where he graduated from Wyomissing Area High School in 1984. In 1988 he received a Bachelor of Arts degree in French and Sociology from Franklin & Marshall College, Lancaster, Pennsylvania. After graduation, he moved to Chicago, where he attended services at Ss. Peter and Paul Church (Orthodox Church in America).

In 1989 he was received into the Orthodox Church from the Episcopal Church. In the fall of the same year, he began studies at St. Tikhon's Seminary in South Canaan, Pennsylvania. One year later he entered the monastic community at St. Tikhon's Monastery as a novice.

=== As a teacher ===
After receiving his Master of Divinity degree from St. Tikhon's in 1993, Mollard was appointed as an instructor in Old Testament Studies there. He continues to serve as senior lecturer in Old Testament, teaching master's-level courses in the prophets, the Psalms, and wisdom literature. He is also an instructor in the seminary's extension studies program, offering courses in the lives of the Old Testament saints, the liturgical use of the Old Testament, and the Old Testament in patristic literature.

=== Monastic life ===
In 1995 Mollard was tonsured to the lesser schema by Archbishop Herman (Swaiko) and given the name Tikhon in honor of St. Tikhon of Moscow. Later that year he was ordained to the Holy Diaconate and Holy Priesthood at St. Tikhon's Monastery. In 1998 he was elevated to the rank of hegumen and in 2000 to the rank of archimandrite.

Archimandrite Tikhon collaborated with Hegumen Alexander (Golitzin) in the publication of The Living Witness of the Holy Mountain, published by St. Tikhon Seminary Press (1996). He illustrated this book about Mount Athos.

In December 2002, Tikhon was appointed by Metropolitan Herman to serve as deputy abbot of St. Tikhon's Monastery.

=== Episcopacy ===
During the Fall Session of Synod of the OCA on October 20–23, 2003, Archimandrite Tikhon was elected as Bishop of South Canaan and Auxiliary to Metropolitan Herman. Tikhon was consecrated to the episcopacy at the monastery on Saturday, February 14, 2004, by Archbishop Herman, becoming Bishop of South Canaan.

At a special session of the Holy Synod of Bishops of the Orthodox Church in America held on May 27, 2005, Bishop Tikhon of South Canaan was elected as Bishop of Philadelphia and Eastern Pennsylvania. On October 29, 2005, Bishop Tikhon was officially installed as the ruling hierarch of the Diocese of Philadelphia and Eastern Pennsylvania during Divine Liturgy at the Saint Stephen Cathedral.

For a part of 2011 he was temporary administrator of the Diocese of the Midwest.

On May 9, 2012, he was elevated to the rank of archbishop.

On November 13, 2012, Archbishop Tikhon was elected Metropolitan of All America and Canada, of the Orthodox Church in America. He is the second convert to be elected to this office, following his predecessor.

Eastern Orthodox Church titles
Preceded by Jonah (Paffhausen)	Primate of the Orthodox Church in America; 2013–present	Incumbent
