= Cathedral of St. John the Baptist (Washington, D.C.) =

Russian Orthodox cathedral in Washington, D.C.

Coordinates: 38.9399647°N 77.0377079°W

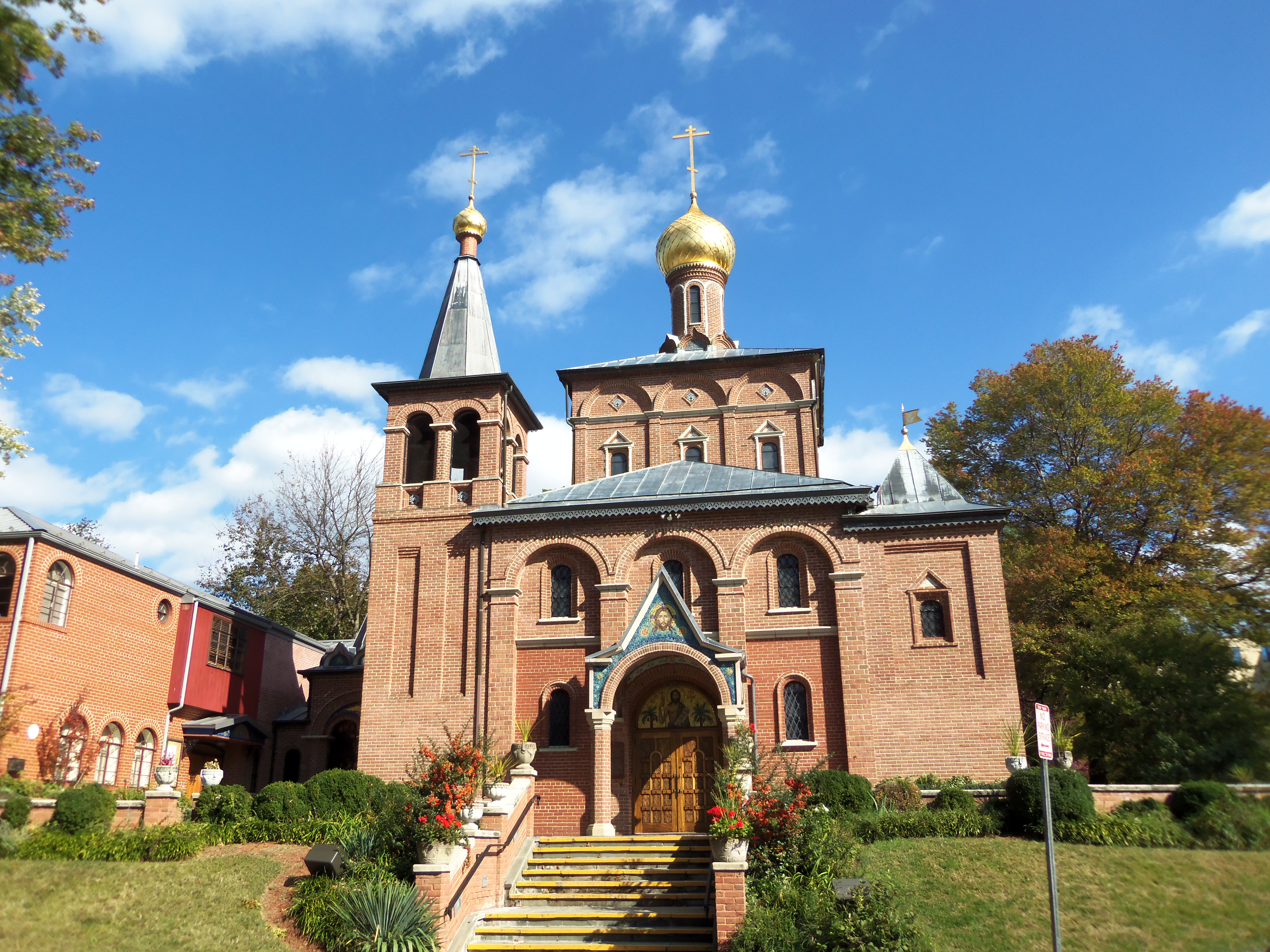
Cathedral of St. John the Baptist

The Cathedral of St. John the Baptist in Washington, D.C., is a cathedral of the Russian Orthodox Church Outside Russia. It was originally founded as a parish church by John Maximovich. For the first nine years, the congregation met in the Resurrection Chapel of the National Cathedral.

== History ==
The Cathedral of St. John the Baptist was founded by Archbishop John Maximovich in 1949 in a visit to the United States, Washington, D.C., to assist in establishing a community for Russian Orthodox refugees after World War II. That September, he helped form a parish dedicated to St. John the Forerunner, which initially held services at the Resurrection Chapel of the National Cathedral. In 1956, the parish secured land near Meridian Hill, and by 1958, the first phase of their church building was completed. Over the years, the structure expanded, adopting a Muscovite-Yaroslavl (also a type of Baroque) style, a variant of the Russian Revival architecture, with onion domes and an iconostasis.
