= Stauropegion =

Eastern Orthodox or Eastern Catholic entity directly subordinated to a primate or Synod

A stauropegion, also spelled stavropegion (from Greek: σταυροπήγιον, in turn from σταυρός stauros lit. "cross" and πήγνυμι pegnumi lit. "to affirm"), is a monastery or a parish which depends directly on the primate or on the Holy Synod of a particular Church, and which is not under the jurisdiction of the local bishop. The name comes from the Byzantine tradition of summoning the Patriarch to place a cross at the foundation of stauropegic monasteries or parochial churches.

Such exempt jurisdictions, both monastic and parochial, are common in Eastern Christianity, mainly in Eastern Orthodox churches, but also in some of the Eastern Catholic Churches. Their institutional counterparts in the Latin Rite ecclesiastical order of the Catholic Church are various exempt jurisdictions, such as monasteries directly subjected to the Holy See of Rome.

== Stauropegic monasteries ==
A stauropegic monastery, also rendered "stavropegic", "stauropegial" or "stavropegial", is an Eastern Orthodox or Eastern Catholic Christian monastery, subordinated directly to a primate or Synod, rather than to a local Bishop.

The practice of exempting some monasteries from jurisdictions of local bishops, placing them under a direct jurisdiction of the patriarch, was present at least since the reign of Byzantine Emperor Maurice (582-602). Such exemptions became more common after the Council of Constantinople (861). In time, those practices included not only monasteries but also various parish churches, to the extent authorities had to regulate the issue by imposing stricter criteria for exemption.

Stauropegic monasteries are distinguished from the greatest monasteries, called lavras, and from the patriarchal metochions, where the patriarch serves as a parish priest. The metochions of the Patriarch of Moscow are the Vysokopetrovsky Monastery and Nikolo-Perervinsky Monastery.

=== Bulgarian Orthodox Church ===
The Bulgarian Orthodox Church has three stauropegic monasteries:

- Rila Monastery
- Bachkovo Monastery
- Troyan Monastery

The Alexander Nevsky Cathedral and the Sofia Seminary are also directly subordinate to the Bulgarian Patriarch and Synod.

=== Greek Orthodox Church ===
The Greek Eastern Orthodox community has one stauropegic monastery:

- Mount Athos Monastery

=== Serbian Orthodox Church ===
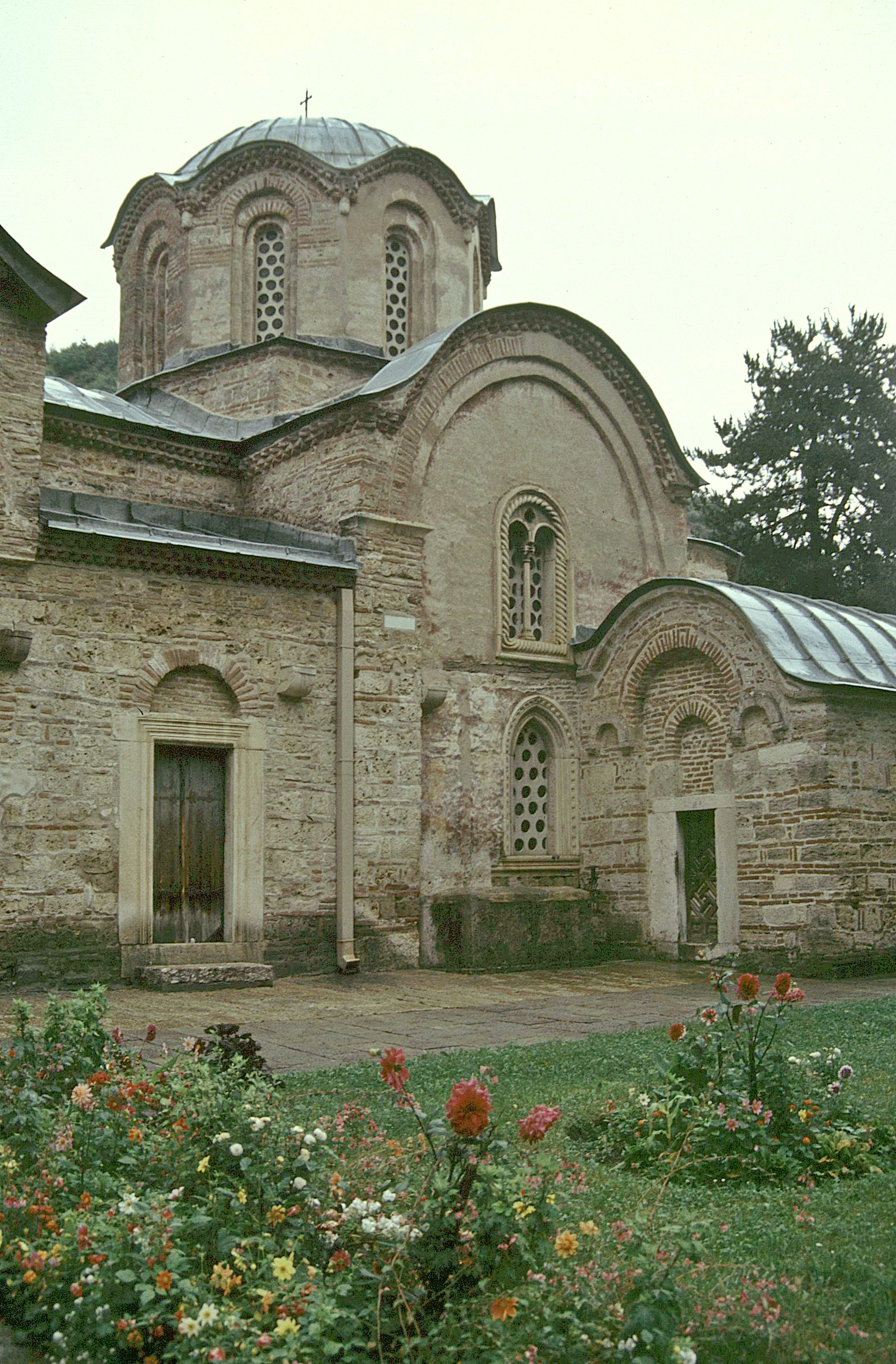
Patriarchal Monastery of Peć, stauropegic monastery of the Serbian Orthodox Church

Several major Serbian Orthodox monasteries had special status in Middle Ages. Today, the Serbian Orthodox Church has two stauropegic monasteries:

- Patriarchal Monastery of Peć, ancient seat of the Serbian Patriarchate of Peć (1346-1463 and 1557-1766). The principal title of Serbian Patriarchs is still Archbishop of Peć.
- Saint Sava Serbian Orthodox Monastery in Libertyville, Illinois, United States.

=== Russian Orthodox Church ===
The first stauropegic monastery in the Russian Orthodox Church was Simonov Monastery (1383). It was subordinated directly to the Ecumenical Patriarch, because it was founded by Greeks and home to the patriarch during his visits to Moscow.

In 1561, Ivan the Terrible decreed that the following seven monasteries should precede all the rest:

- Trinity Lavra, Sergiev Posad
- Chudov Monastery, Moscow
- Andronikov Monastery, Moscow
- Kirillo-Belozersky Monastery, Kirillov
- Epiphany Monastery, Moscow
- Pafnutiev Monastery, Borovsk
- Joseph-Volokolamsky Monastery near Volokolamsk

After the establishment of the Patriarchate in Moscow, no stauropegic monasteries were subordinated directly to the Patriarch for some time. Nikon then founded the New Jerusalem Monastery, Valday Iversky Monastery, and Kiy Island Monastery, which he governed himself, instead of placing each under an hegumen (abbot).

The Greek custom, first introduced by Nikon, was continued by other Patriarchs and the Holy Governing Synod. Stauropegic houses were not always the most important monasteries, the holiest, the richest, or the largest. They might have been dear to the ruling Patriarch for personal reasons. In the 19th century, apart from four lavras, seven monasteries were considered stauropegial:

- Novospassky Monastery, Moscow
- New Jerusalem Monastery, Istra
- Simonov Monastery, Moscow
- Donskoy Monastery, Moscow
- Solovetsky Monastery, Solovki
- Yakovlevsky Monastery, Rostov
- Zaikonospassky Monastery, Moscow

As of 2000, the following monasteries were recognized as stauropegial by the Russian Orthodox Church:

Monasteries of Moscow:

- Danilov Monastery, Moscow
- Donskoy Monastery, Moscow
- Novospassky Monastery, Moscow
- Sretensky Monastery, Moscow
- Zachatyevsky Convent, Moscow
- Intercession Convent, Moscow
- Nativity Convent, Moscow

Monasteries of Central Russia:

- Joseph-Volokolamsky Monastery, Moscow Oblast
- New Jerusalem Monastery, Moscow Oblast
- Optina Monastery, Kaluga Oblast
- St. Savva Monastery, Moscow Oblast
- Ugreshi Monastery, Moscow Oblast
- Amvrosievsky Shamordinsky Convent, Kaluga Oblast
- Borisoglebsky Anosin Convent, Moscow Oblast
- Intercession Convent, Khotkovo, Moscow Oblast
- Krestovozdvizhensky Convent, Moscow Oblast

Monasteries of North-Western Russia:

- Solovetsky Monastery, Arkhangelsk Oblast
- Valaam Monastery, Republic of Karelia
- Vyashchizhi Monastery, Novgorod Oblast
- Ioannovsky Convent, Saint Petersburg

Monasteries outside Russia:

- Assumption Monastery, Zhirovitsy, Hrodna Oblast, Belarus
- Glinsk Hermitage, Sumy Oblast, Ukraine
- Holy Trinity Monastery, Jordanville, New York, United States
- Pühtitsa Convent, Estonia
- St. George Monastery, Horodnytsia, Zhytomyr Oblast, Ukraine
- Trinity Convent, Korets, Rivne Oblast, Ukraine
- Assumption Monastery, Zimne, Volyn Oblast, Ukraine

=== Ukrainian Greek Catholic Church ===
A stauropegial monastery (monasterium stauropegiaceum) under patriarchal jurisdiction (monasterium iuris patriarchalis) is a monastery subject directly to the patriarch (can. 434 Code of Canons of the Eastern Churches).

Monasteries in Ukraine:

- Univ Lavra

== Stauropegic parishes ==
Stauropegic parishes in Eastern Orthodoxy are exempt parishes not under jurisdiction of a local bishop, but directly subjected to a higher hierarch, usually a patriarch. Such parishes are created for various reasons, symbolic or practical.

== See also ==
- Ecclesiastical jurisdiction
- Eastern Orthodox canon law
- Exemption (Catholic Church)
- Royal Peculiar
- Patriarchal Stavropegic Monastery of St. John the Baptist (England)
- Orthodox Church in America Stavropegial Institutions

== Sources ==
- Burdzy, Dominika (2019). "At the Crossroads of Cultures: The Orthodox Confraternities of Central and Eastern Europe from the 16th to the 18th Century". A Companion to Medieval and Early Modern Confraternities. Leiden-Boston: Brill. pp. 257–279. ISBN 9789004392915.
- Thomas, John P. (1987). Private Religious Foundations in the Byzantine Empire. Washington, D.C.: Dumbarton Oaks. ISBN 9780884021643.
- Troianos, Spyros (2012). "Byzantine Canon Law from the Twelfth to the Fifteenth Centuries". The History of Byzantine and Eastern Canon Law to 1500. Washington: CUA Press. pp. 170–214. ISBN 9780813216799.
