= Orthodox Church in America Archdiocese of Washington =

Diocese of the Orthodox Church in America

Coordinates: 38.9504°N 77.1782°W

Archdiocese of Washington

orthodox

Location
- Country: United States
- Territory: Washington, D.C., southern Delaware, Maryland and Virginia
- Metropolitan: Tikhon (Mollard)
- Denomination: Eastern Orthodox

Current leadership
- Parent church: Orthodox Church in America
- Archbishop: Tikhon (Mollard)

Website
- wdcoca.org

The Archdiocese of Washington is a diocese of the Orthodox Church in America (OCA). Its territory includes parishes, monasteries, and missions located in Washington, D.C., southern Delaware, Maryland and Virginia. From 2005 to July 1, 2009, it was known as the Diocese of Washington and New York, until the Diocese of New York and New Jersey was reestablished as a separate diocese.

The archbishop of Washington is Metropolitan Tikhon (Mollard), who is also the OCA's ruling primate.

== History ==
At the 6th All-American Council, the Holy Synod of Bishops decided to form a new Diocese of Washington, D.C. by splitting the Washington area from the rest of the diocese. The new diocese began functioning in 1981 as the see of the Primate of the Orthodox Church in America. However, the national administrative offices remained at Syosset, within the Diocese of New York and New Jersey. In 1981, the Diocese of New York and New Jersey became one of the local dioceses under its own hierarch, Bishop Peter (L'Huillier), with his see at the Holy Protection Cathedral.

The formation of the Diocese of Washington included the areas of Washington, D.C., Maryland, southern Delaware, and northern Virginia. The St. Nicholas Cathedral in Washington was the see for the Metropolitan. At its inception the new diocese included only a few parishes, those in the Baltimore and Washington metropolitan areas. During the following two decades after formation of the diocese a number of new parishes formed as the population of the diocese increased.

In 2005, after the election of Metr. Herman as the ruling hierarch of the OCA and with the retirement of Abp. Peter, the Holy Synod of the OCA re-merged the dioceses of New York and New Jersey and Washington as the Diocese of Washington and New York. St. Nicholas Cathedral in Washington was designated the see of the ruling hierarch.

In 2009, the Diocese of New York and New Jersey was re-established as a separate diocese.
