= Saint Tikhon's Orthodox Theological Seminary =

Orthodox Christian seminary in Wayne County, Pennsylvania

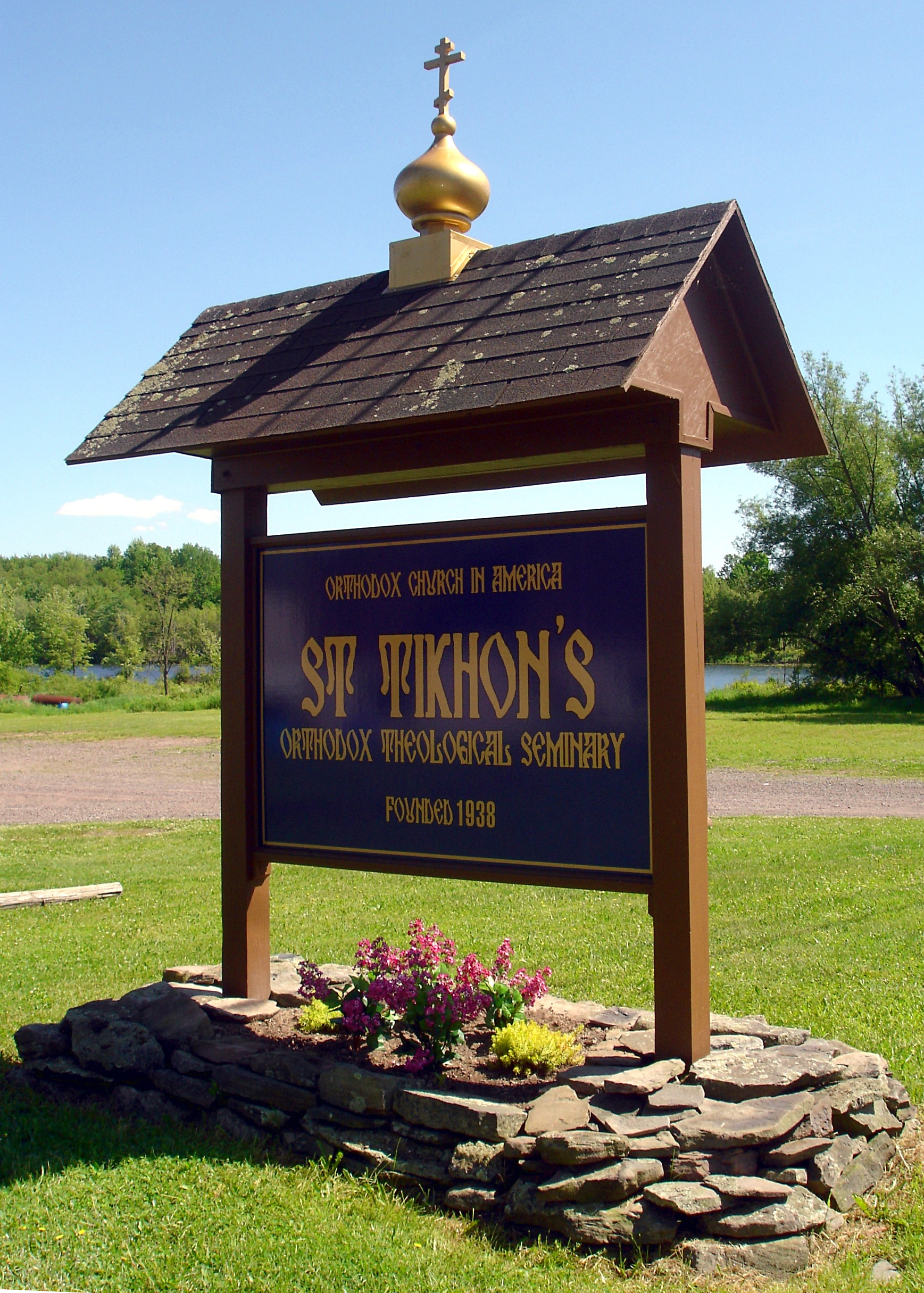
- Photo of the seminary's sign in 2010
- Type: Seminary
- Established: 1938 (88 years ago)
- Accreditation: Association of Theological Schools in the United States and Canada
- Religious affiliation: Orthodox Church in America
- Dean: John Parker
- Academic staff: 4 (fall 2024)
- Students: 39 (fall 2024)
- Location: South Canaan Township, Pennsylvania, United States; 41°30′53.2434″N 75°24′3.5634″W
- Website: https://www.stots.edu/

Saint Tikhon's Orthodox Theological Seminary (Russian: Свято-Тихоновская духовная семинария) is an Orthodox Christian seminary located in South Canaan Township, Wayne County, Pennsylvania. It is one of three seminaries operated by the Orthodox Church in America, the others being St. Vladimir's Orthodox Theological Seminary in Crestwood, Yonkers, New York, and St. Herman's Orthodox Theological Seminary in Kodiak, Alaska. It is named after Tikhon of Zadonsk.

== History ==
St. Tikhon's was founded in 1938 as a pastoral school by resolution of the 6th All-American Sobor of the Russian Orthodox Greek Catholic Church in North America (North American Metropolia). The Seminary was officially transformed from a Pastoral School into a Seminary by the Holy Synod of the Metropolia in 1942.

In 1967, the Seminary was chartered by the Commonwealth of Pennsylvania. A formal transfer agreement with Marywood College (now Marywood University), in nearby Scranton, was articulated and signed in 1975. In 1988, the Seminary was authorized by the Pennsylvania Department of Education to award the Master of Divinity (MDiv) degree to its graduates. The first MDiv degrees were conferred on the graduating class of 1989.

In June 2004, the Seminary was granted accreditation by the Association of Theological Schools in the United States and Canada. It remains accredited with the agency as of 2025.

In March 2010 the Ministry of Education of Greece formally recognized St. Tikhon's Seminary as an accredited institution of Higher Education, equal in standing to the schools of theology in Greek universities. The Greek Ministry of Education also affirmed that the Master of Divinity degree conferred by STS is equivalent to the first degree in Theology conferred by the Faculties of Theology in the Universities of Athens and Thessalonica, and allows the holder to pursue the graduate studies programs or the doctoral programs (Th.D.) in those universities. Due to Greece's membership in the European Union, the recognition of STS as an institution of higher theological learning, equal in status with Greek schools, extends to all schools and religious faculties of the universities within the EU's member states.

== Academics ==
As of fall 2024, the school has 39 students and 4 faculty members. It offers a Master of Divinity program.

== Leadership ==
=== Rectors ===
- Kiprian Borisevich (1961–1981)
- Herman Swaiko (1981–2002)

=== Deans ===
- Archbishop Michael Dahulich (2002–2010)
- Alexander Atty (2010–2013)
- Igumen Sergius (2013; interim)
- Steven Voytovich (2013–2018)
- Archpriest John Parker (2018–Present)

== Publishing ==
St. Tikhon's Monastery Press (formerly the St. Tikhon's Seminary Press) is a leading publisher of Orthodox service books and other spiritual material.
