= South Canaan Township, Pennsylvania =

Township in Pennsylvania, US

South Canaan Township
- Township
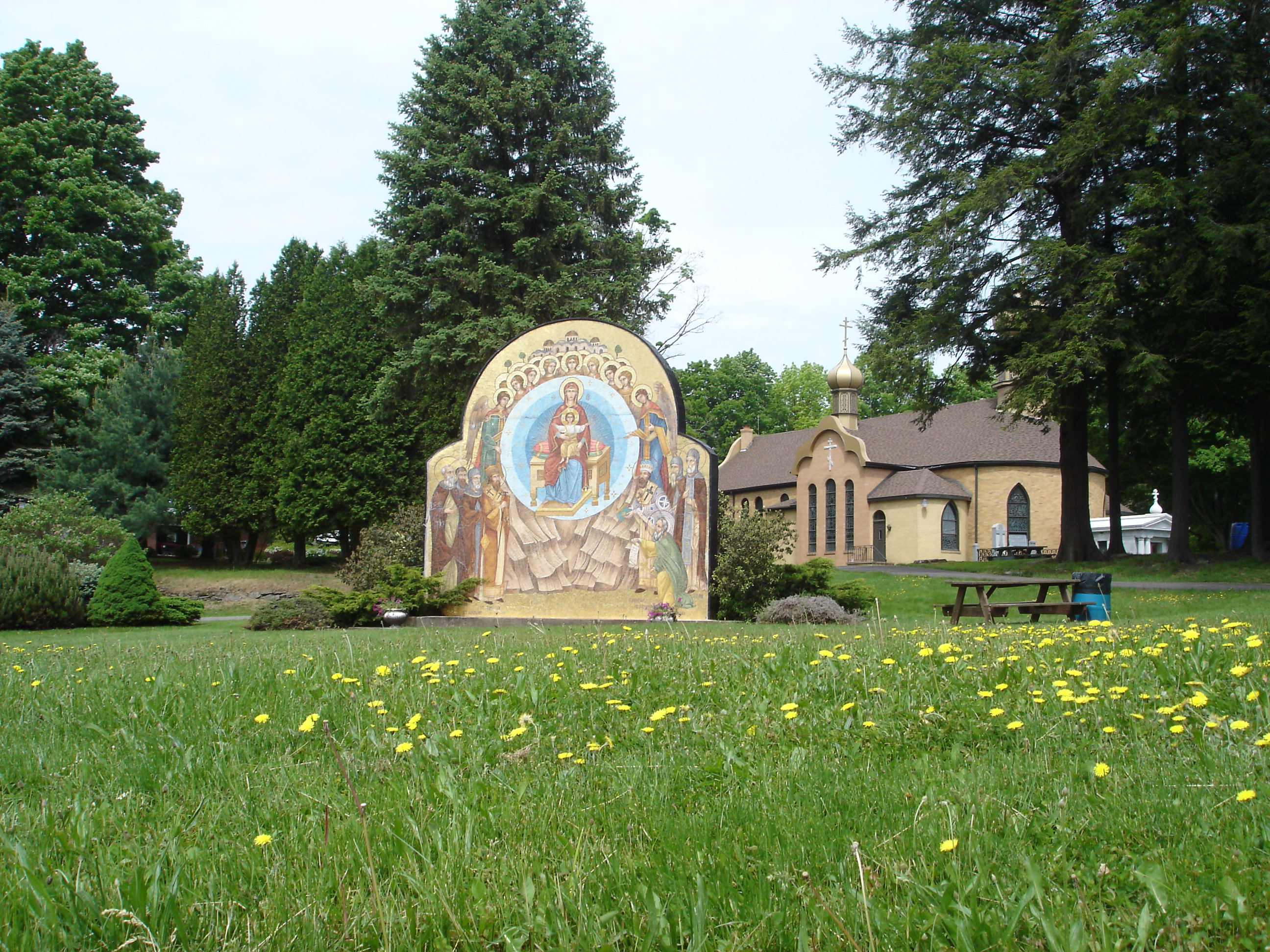
- St Tikhon Monastery

- Location in Wayne County and the state of Pennsylvania.

- Location of Pennsylvania in the United States
- Coordinates: 41°32′00″N 75°24′59″W
- Country: United States
- State: Pennsylvania
- County: Wayne

Area
  - Total: 28.24 sq mi (73.13 km^{2})
  - Land: 27.46 sq mi (71.13 km^{2})
  - Water: 0.77 sq mi (2.00 km^{2})
- Elevation: 1,444 ft (440 m)

Population (2010)
  - Total: 1,768
  - Estimate (2016): 1,708
  - Density: 62.2/sq mi (24.01/km^{2})
- Time zone: UTC-5 (EST)
  - Summer (DST): UTC-4 (EDT)
- Zip Code: 18436, 18459, 18472
- Area code: 570
- FIPS code: 42-127-72024
- Website: https://southcanaantwp.com/

South Canaan is a second-class township in Wayne County, Pennsylvania, United States. The township's population was 1,768 at the time of the 2010 United States Census.

South Canaan is home to Saint Tikhon's Orthodox Theological Seminary and the oldest Eastern Orthodox monastery in North America — Saint Tikhon's Orthodox Monastery (Russian: Тихоновский монастырь).

== History ==
The Octagon Stone Schoolhouse was added to the National Register of Historic Places in 1977.

== Geography ==
According to the United States Census Bureau, the township has a total area of 28.2 square miles (72.9 km^{2}), of which 27.5 square miles (70.4 km^{2}) is land and 0.7 square mile (1.8 km^{2}) (2.48%) is water.

== Demographics ==
Historical population
Census	Pop.	Note	%±
2010	1,768		—
2016 (est.)	1,708		−3.4%
U.S. Decennial Census

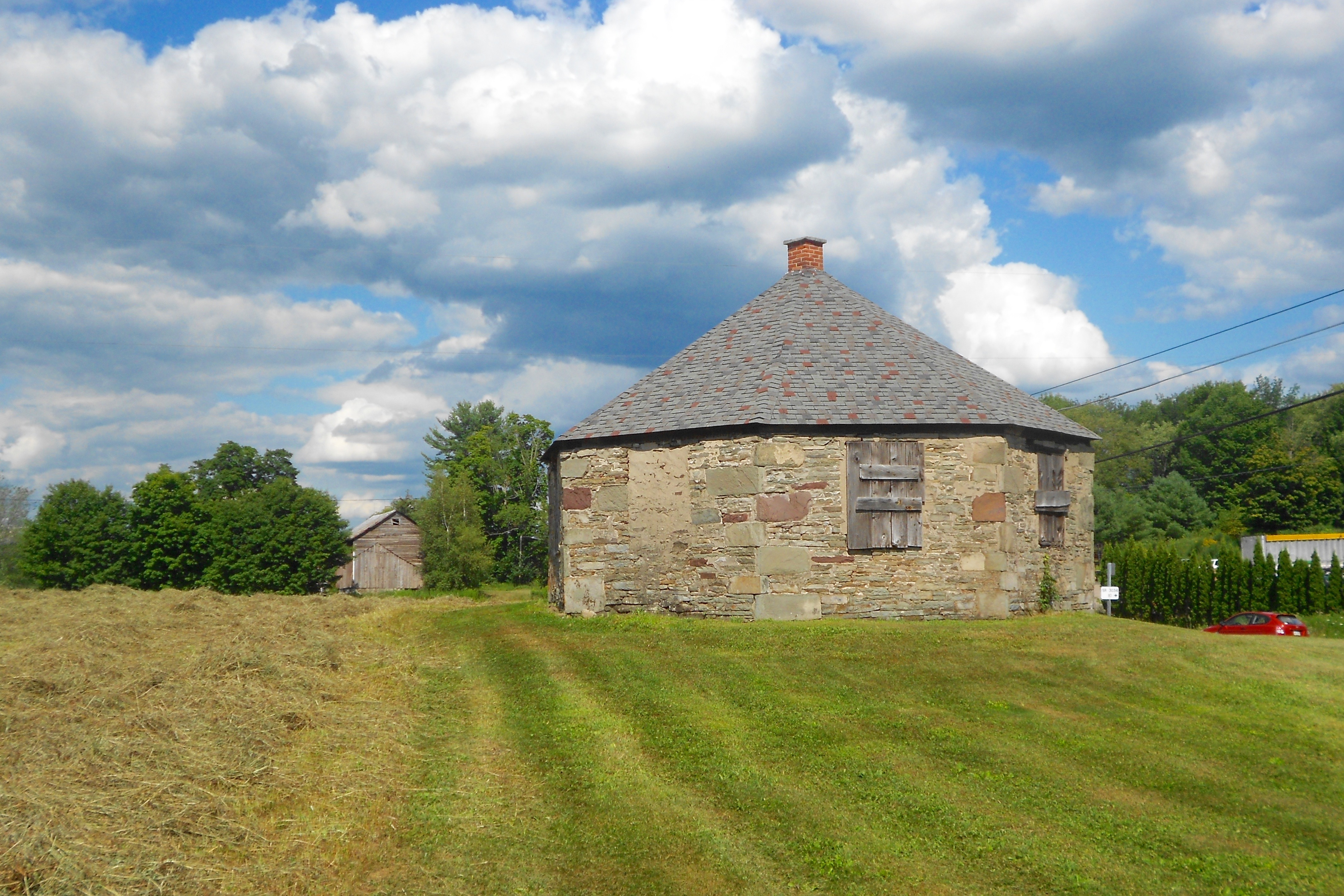
Octagon Stone Schoolhouse

At the 2010 census, there were 1,768 people, 645 households, and 487 families in the township. The population density was 64.3 inhabitants per square mile (24.8/km^{2}). There were 762 housing units at an average density of 27.7 per square mile (10.7/km^{2}). The racial makeup of the township was 96.9% White, 0.5% Black, 0.2% American Indian, 1.1% Asian, and 1.3% from two or more races. Hispanic or Latino of any race were 1.3% of the population.

Of the 645 households, 30.5% had children under the age of 18 living with them, 61.4% were married couples living together, 9.6% had a female householder with no husband present, and 24.5% were non-families. 19.4% of households were one person, and 9.3% were one person aged 65 or older. The average household size was 2.68 and the average family size was 3.06.

In the township, the population was spread out, with 24.2% under the age of 18, 58.8% from 18 to 64, and 17% 65 or older. The median age was 42.3 years.

The median household income was $33,177 and the median family income was $40,170. Males had a median income of $26,484 versus $22,400 for females. The per capita income for the township was $16,706. About 10.6% of families and 12.6% of the population were below the poverty line, including 19.8% of those under age 18 and 5.8% of those age 65 or over.
