= List of mosques in Mexico =

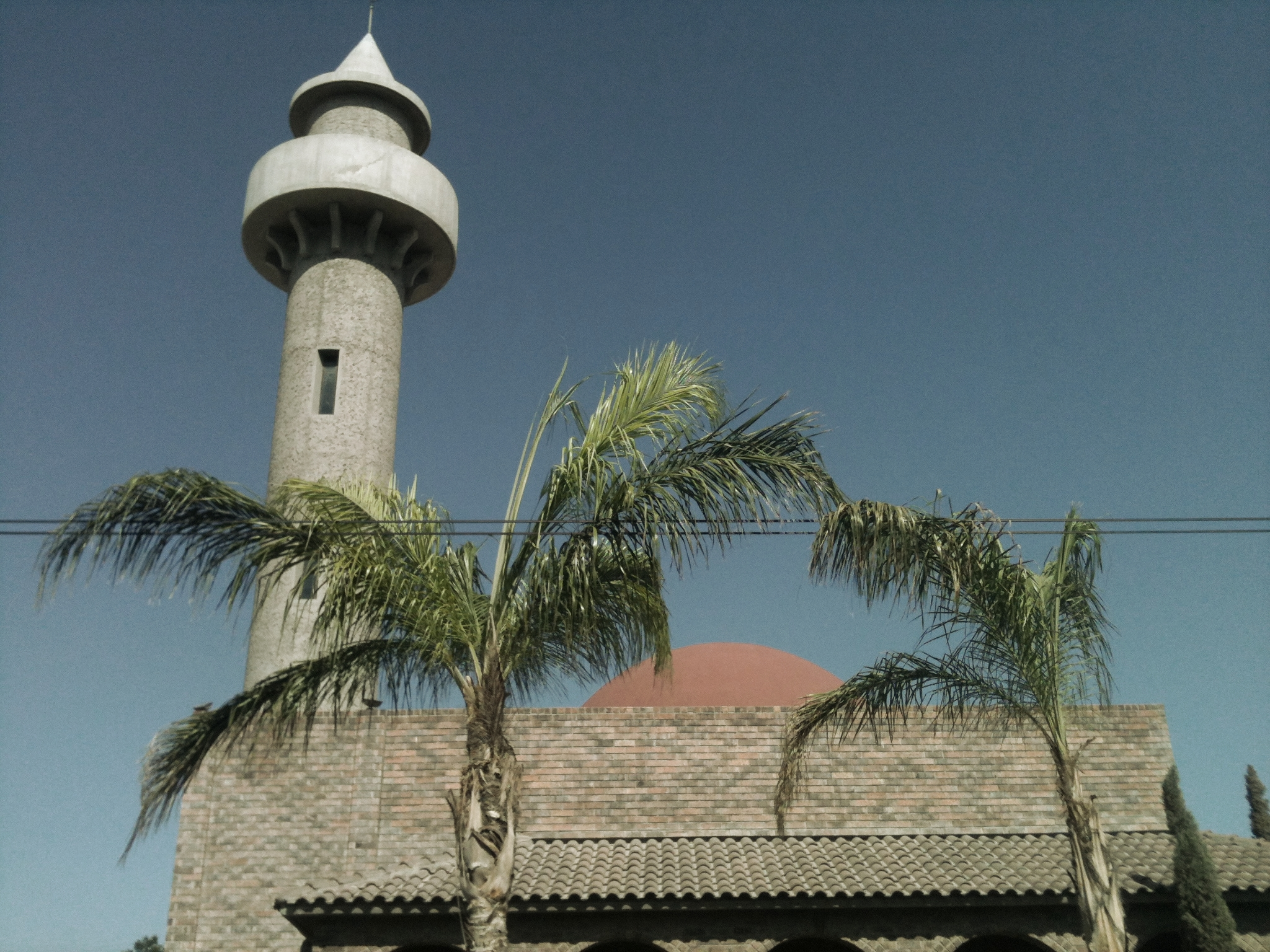
Suraya Mosque, the first mosque in Mexico

This is a list of notable mosques in Mexico (Arabic: Masjid, Spanish: Mezquita), including Islamic places of worship that do not qualify as traditional mosques.

According to ICNA, there are more than 40 established mosques in Mexico. Muslim-friendly facilities are not widely available, there are a few prayer facilities spread across the country. These Muslim-friendly facilities are used by the local Muslim community, and increasingly by Muslim tourists.

== Notable individual mosques ==
Name	Image	Location	State	Year	Group (Note: S = Sunni Islam; SH = Shia Islam; A = Ahmadiyya; ND = Non-denominational)	Notes
Masjid al-Islam		Tijuana	Baja California	2011		
Masjid El Noor		Rosarito	Baja California			Female prayer section, Restrooms
Masjid Omar		Tijuana	Baja California			Daily prayers, Quranic studies
Rosarito Islamic Center & Masjid		Rosarito	Baja California			Female prayer section, Restrooms
Tijuana Islamic Center		Tijuana	Baja California			Restrooms
Al Kautsar Mosque		San Cristóbal de las Casas	Chiapas			Daily prayers, Friday prayers, Female prayer section
Imam Malik Mosque		San Cristóbal de las Casas	Chiapas	2017		Restrooms, Quran classes, Hadith Classes
Boletin Islamic		Chihuahua City	Chihuahua			Female prayer section, Restrooms
Suraya Mosque		Torreón	Coahuila	1989	SH	First mosque in Mexico. Daily prayers, Friday prayers, Female prayer section
Asociación de Musulmanes Mexico		Guadalajara	Jalisco			Female prayer section, Restrooms
Al Markaz as-Salafi al-Mexik		Mexico City	Mexico City	2007		Female prayer section, Restrooms
Muslim Community Education Center		Mexico City	Mexico City	2001		Female prayer section, Restrooms, Arabic classes, Quran classes.
Masjid Dar As Salam		Tequesquitengo	Morelos			Restrooms, Arabic Classes, Quran Classes, Hadith Classes.
Islamic Cultural Center of Monterrey		Monterrey	Nuevo León			Female prayer section, Restrooms
Al Kareem Islamic Center		Puebla City	Puebla			Female prayer section, Restrooms
Mezquita Abu Bakr (Masjid/Mosque Abu Bakr)		Mexico City	Mexico City	2022		Female prayer section, Restrooms
Centro Islamico Chihuahua -Madina Masjid		Chihuahua	Chihuahua	2022		Restrooms, Solaatul Jumah

== See also ==
- Islam in Mexico
- Religion in Mexico
- Lists of mosques in North America
- Lists of mosques (worldwide)
- List of the oldest mosques in the world
