= St. Seraphim Cathedral (Dallas) =

Cathedral in Dallas, Texas

Coordinates: 32.819514°N 96.803778°W

Saint Seraphim Cathedral
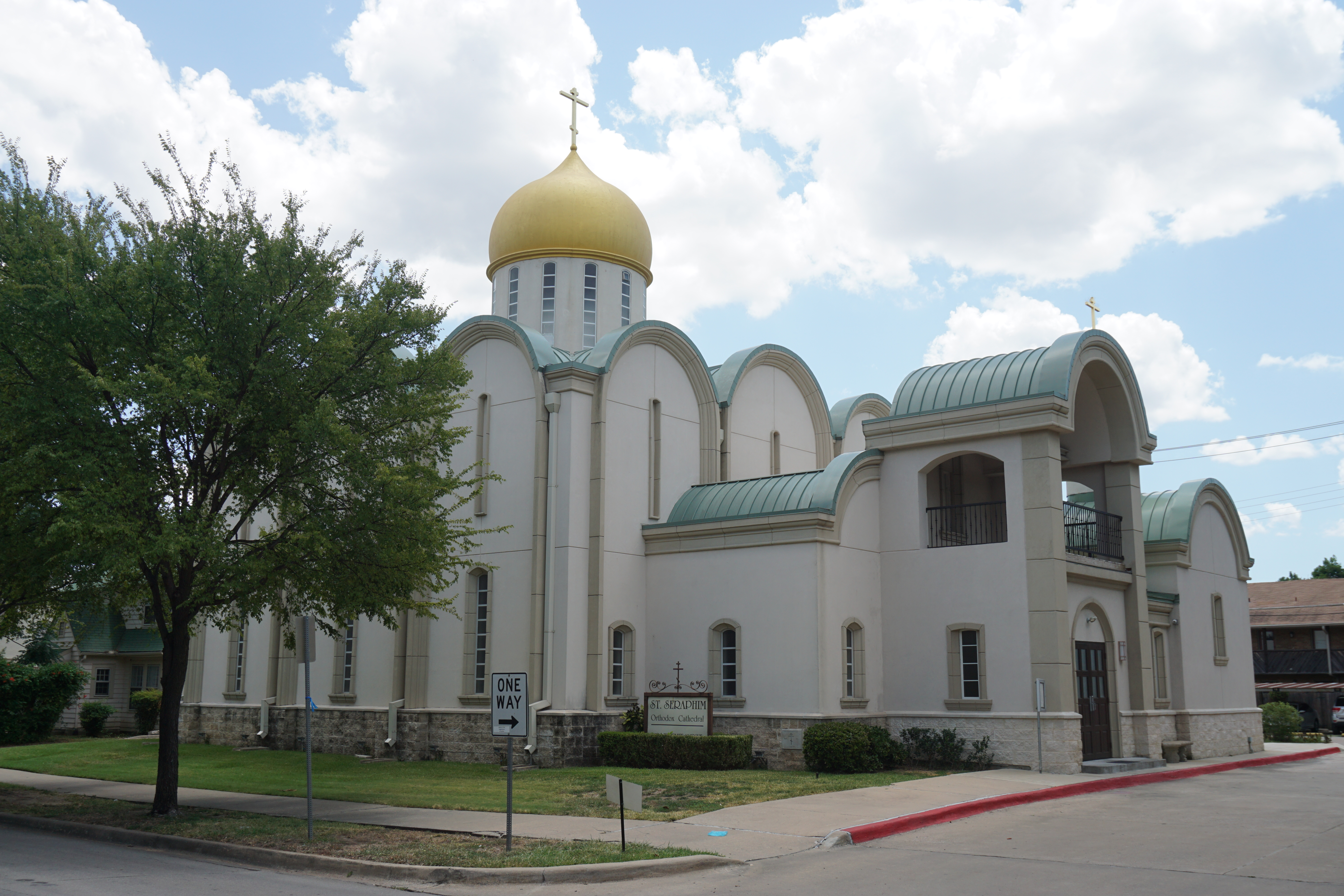
- Saint Seraphim Cathedral
- Saint Seraphim Cathedral
- Location: 4208 Wycliff Avenue, Dallas, Texas 75219
- Country: United States
- Denomination: Orthodox Church of America
- Website: https://www.stseraphim.org/

Architecture
- Functional status: Active
- Architectural type: Cathedral

Administration
- Metropolis: Metropolis of the South
- Archdiocese: Archdiocese of the South

Clergy
- Archbishop: Alexander (Golitzin)
- Dean: Gerasim (Eliel)

Saint Seraphim Cathedral, is an Eastern Orthodox cathedral located in the Oak Lawn neighborhood of Dallas, Texas. It is the episcopal seat of the Orthodox Church in America Diocese of the South, sharing its status with Christ the Saviour Cathedral in Miami Lakes, Florida. The cathedral is named after St. Seraphim of Sarov.

== Today ==
After the creation of Diocese of the South in July 1978 Saint Seraphim's was elevated from a parish to a cathedral with Bishop Dmitri as its rector and Diocesan Bishop. As of June 2021 the rector is Bishop Gerasim (Eliel) of Ft. Worth, who also serves as the Administrator of the Diocese.

Plans for a chapel and bell tower were in the works as of 2013, after a few set backs the chapel building is now complete. The chapel is attached to the southwest corner of the building and is named after the Resurrection. Archbishop Dmitri, the founder of the diocese, is buried there.
