= Dmitri Royster =

American Eastern Orthodox archbishop

His Eminence Dmitri
- Archbishop of the South
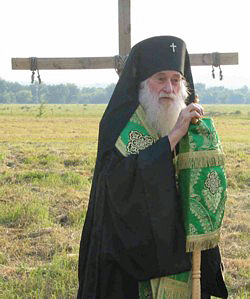
- Archbishop Dmitri in 2007
- Diocese: Diocese of Dallas and the South, Mexican Exarchate (OCA)
- See: Dallas, Texas
- Installed: 1978
- Predecessor: Diocese Created
- Successor: Archbishop Alejo (Pacheco y Vera) (Diocese of Mexico); Archbishop Alexander (Golitzin) (Diocese of the South)

Orders
- Ordination: November 6, 1954 by Bogdan (Spylka)
- Consecration: June 22, 1969

Personal details
- Born: Robert Royster; November 2, 1923 Teague, Texas
- Died: August 28, 2011 (aged 87) Dallas, Texas
- Buried: St. Seraphim Orthodox Cathedral (Dallas)
- Denomination: Eastern Orthodox, Orthodox Church in America
- Occupation: Monastic, Theologian, Translator
- Profession: Archbishop

Archbishop Dmitri (born Robert Roscoe Royster; November 2, 1923 – August 28, 2011) was an American hierarch of the Orthodox Church in America. He served as archbishop of the church's Diocese of the South from 1978 to 2009 and was the ruling bishop of the Mexican Exarchate from 1972 to 2008. The territory of the former diocese covered fourteen states in the United States – Alabama, Arkansas, Florida, Georgia, Kentucky, Louisiana, Mississippi, New Mexico, North Carolina, Oklahoma, South Carolina, Tennessee, Texas, and Virginia. In Orthodox Christian circles he is sometimes called the Apostle to the South.

== Birth ==
Robert Roscoe Royster was born in Teague, Texas on November 2, 1923, and was raised as a Southern Baptist, being baptized (by single immersion) in the name of the Holy Trinity at age 12. Though his father was non-practicing, his mother was devout. Robert was instilled with a deep reverence for the Holy Scriptures at an early age. It was, for this reason, that he and his older sister became convinced that the spirit of Protestantism and the spirit of the Holy Scriptures were incompatible.

== Conversion to Orthodoxy ==
After finding incompatibility between Protestantism and the Holy Scriptures he and his sister began to search for "the original scriptural community and roots of the early church". He later stated:

We began to look around. We visited a number of Churches. We had a big book called the Book of World Religions, or something like that, in which all religions and denominations were described, Rather briefly, but at the same time rather completely. There was a rather complete description of the Eastern Orthodox Church in there. It described the Orthodox Church as being the mother of all Christian Churches. We began to look at the New Testament rather carefully and pick out portions of the New Testament that reflected in some way what the Church was in the Apostolic Age. Really, when you put it together, there is quite a bit of it. It isn't as skimpy or as sketchy a description as it might appear on the surface.

After attending Orthros and Divine Liturgy at age 15 he later recalled: "We knew from that moment that we would probably not go anywhere else...It was so evident that something really took place...the Holy Spirit transforming the bread and wine."

The two formally began their inquiry in 1939, with the personal blessing of Archbishop Athenagoras (at the time Archbishop of the Greek Orthodox Archdiocese of America) with Father Daniel Sakalarios as their teacher. He and his sister were eventually received into Orthodoxy in 1941 at Holy Trinity Greek Orthodox Church in Dallas, Texas.

== Priesthood and episcopacy ==
He entered North Texas State University but left in 1943 to join the Army. While in the Army he served as a Japanese language interpreter on the staff of General Douglas MacArthur in the Philippines and Japan.

After leaving the Army he resumed his studies, eventually becoming a Spanish language instructor at Southern Methodist University. He received his Master of Arts in Spanish.

In 1954, Royster was ordained to the priesthood, and served as the rector of St. Seraphim Orthodox Church in Dallas from then until 1969. On June 29, 1969, he was consecrated as Bishop of Berkeley, vicar of the Diocese of San Francisco and the West.

In 1970, Bishop Dmitri was assigned as Bishop of Washington, auxiliary bishop to Metropolitan Irenaeus (Bekish).

On October 19, 1971, Bishop Dmitri was elected Bishop of Hartford and New England

On March 9, 1977 OCA Primate metropolitan Irenaeus (Bekish) petitioned the Holy Synod to grant him retirement. By the Synod’s decision, his retirement became effective since October 25, 1977. At the Fifth All-American Council, 463 accredited delegates convened to elect a new Primate. Bishop Dmitri (Royster) of Hartford and New England received 278 votes for nomination. However, this was not enough for a qualified majority of 2/3 of the participants, which was 308. A second round of voting was held. Bishop Dmitri received majority of 348 votes. But after OCA autocephaly, it was determined that only members of the Holy Synod of OCA could participate in the election. A short time later, Bishop Gregory (Borisevich) announced to the Council, on behalf of the Holy Synod, that Bishop Theodosius (Lazor) had been elected as new Primate of the Orthodox Church in America.. Decades later, the Orthodox theologian protopresbyter Thomas Hopko described the impact of that election this way: "One could have gone to Syosset and become a metropolitan, or go to Dallas and become a saint".

In 1978, Bishop Dmitri became the first ruling bishop of the newly created Diocese of the South. He was elevated to the rank of archbishop in 1993.

Being a senior bishop in his church, Dmitri was the locum tenens of the Metropolitan's see and temporary head of the OCA from September 4, 2008 until the election of a new primate, Metropolitan Jonah on November 12, 2008.

On March 31, 2009 the then 85-year-old archbishop was granted retirement from active pastoral duties by the Holy Synod of the OCA.

== Death ==
Archbishop Dmitri died in Dallas on August 28, 2011, on the Julian calendar feast of the Dormition, which was his favorite feast day. Although originally interred in Restland Cemetery in Dallas, Texas, he was disinterred on March 4, 2016 in order to transfer his body to his new tomb in the Saint Seraphim Cathedral also in Dallas. However, during the removal of his body from his place of burial, his body was found to be untouched by decay, a sign of sainthood in Orthodox Christianity. This fact was attested to by a local specialist who was hired for the exhumation process.

== Bibliography ==
Articles

- A Christian Understanding of Freedom
- The Commandment of Love
- Confession
- The Goal of Lent
- Liturgical Commemorations in Preparations for the Nativity
- «The Lord Is My Shepherd»
- The Meeting of Our Lord
- Pentecost
- Reconciliation, Education, Evangelization
- St. Thomas Sunday
- The Seventh Sunday of Pascha
- Sunday of the Cross
- The Sundays after Pentecost
- The Theotokos
- «Thus It Becometh Us to Fulfill All Righteousness»
- The Transfiguration of Christ
- The Veneration of the Virgin Mary in the Orthodox Church
- What’s in the Stars? A Close Look at Astrology

Books

- The Parables (1996). St. Vladimir's Seminary Press. ISBN 978-0-88141-067-9.
- The Kingdom of God: The Sermon on the Mount (1997). St. Vladimir's Seminary Press. ISBN 978-0-88141-116-4.
- The Miracles of Christ (1999). St. Vladimir's Seminary Press. ISBN 978-0-88141-193-5.
- The Epistle to the Hebrews: A Commentary (2003). St. Vladimir's Seminary Press. ISBN 978-0-88141-247-5.
- St. Paul's Epistle to the Romans: A Pastoral Commentary (2008). St. Vladimir's Seminary Press. ISBN 978-0-88141-321-2.
- The Epistle of St. James: A Commentary (2010). St. Vladimir's Seminary Press. ISBN 978-0-88141-875-0.

== Notes ==
Eastern Orthodox Church titles
Preceded by Diocese created	Archbishop of Dallas and the South; 1978–2009	Succeeded by Alexander (Golitzin)
Preceded by Exarchate created	Exarch of Mexico; 1972–2008	Succeeded by Alejo (Pacheco y Vera)
