= Religion in Mexico =

Religion in Mexico (2020 census)
1. Catholicism (77.8%)
2. Protestantism (11.7%)
3. Other Christian (1.80%)
4. Non-religious (8.40%)
5. Other religions (0.30%)

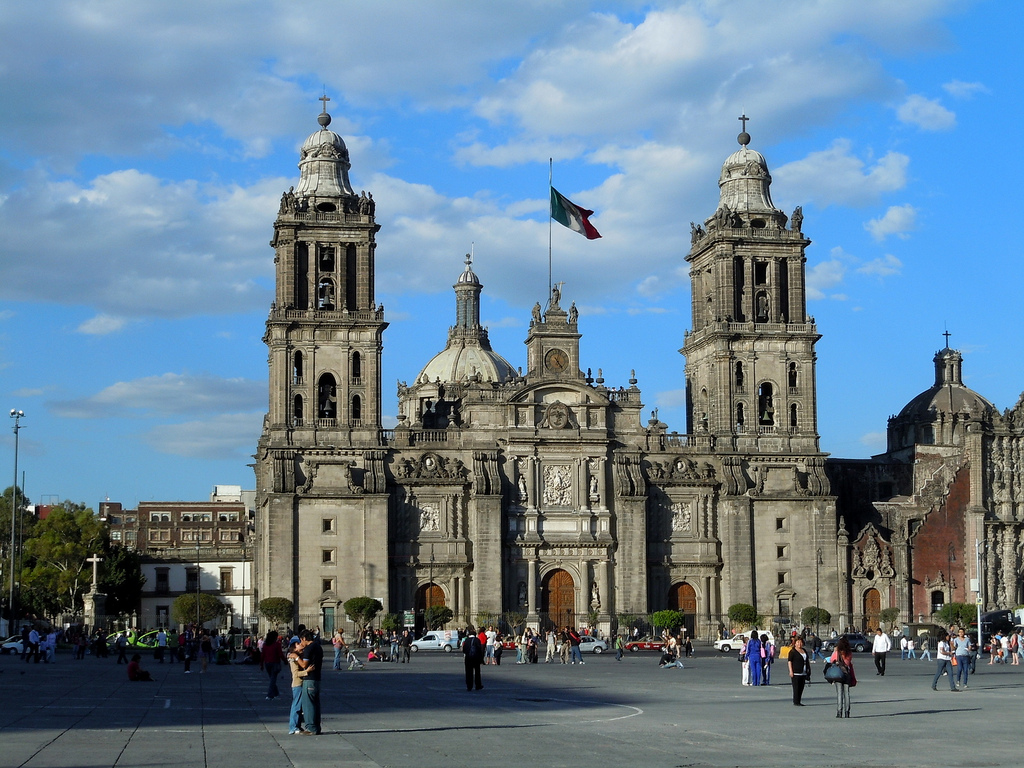
The Mexico City Metropolitan Cathedral (Catholic).

Christianity is the predominant religion in Mexico comprising 91.3% of the population. Catholicism is its largest denomination representing around 78% of the total population as of the 2020 INEGI census. In recent decades the share of Catholics has been declining, due to the growth of other Christian denominations – especially various Protestant churches, Jehovah's Witness and Mormonism – which now constitute larger shares of the population. Conversion to non-Catholic denominations has been considerably lower than in Central America, and central Mexico remains one of the most Catholic areas in the world.

Mexico is a secular country and has allowed freedom of religion since the mid-19th century. Mainline Protestant denominations and the open practice of Judaism established themselves in the country during that era. Modern growth has been seen in Evangelical Protestantism, Mormonism and in folk religions, such as Mexicayotl. Buddhism and Islam have both made limited inroads through immigration and conversion.

== Religion and the state ==
The Mexican Constitution of 1917 imposed limitations on the Catholic Church in Mexico and sometimes codified state intrusion into religious matters. The government does not provide financial contributions to the religious institutions, nor does the Catholic Church participate in public education. Christmas is a national holiday and every year during Easter and Christmas all schools in Mexico, public and private, send their students on vacation.

In a major reversal of the Mexican state's restrictions on religion, the constitution was amended in 1992 lifting almost all restrictions on the religions, including granting all religious groups legal status, conceding them limited property, and lifting restrictions on the number of priests in the country. Until recently, priests did not have the right to vote, and even now they cannot be elected to public office.

== Historical trends ==
- Sources: Based on Pew Center Research (including historical percentages of Catholicism) and the National Institution of Statistics and Geography (INEGI) both historical Census and specially 2010 and 2020 Census, according to WorldDataValue and Latinobarómetro, Catholicism grew since 1995 or end-90s, in fact almost 30% of Mexicans are involved in religious denomination changes one, twice or more times, near 70% has been always Catholic affiliated (compared to 82% in 1960) and near 3% has been from other religion or none.
Religion affiliation over time. View chart definition.

== Abrahamic religions ==
=== Christianity ===
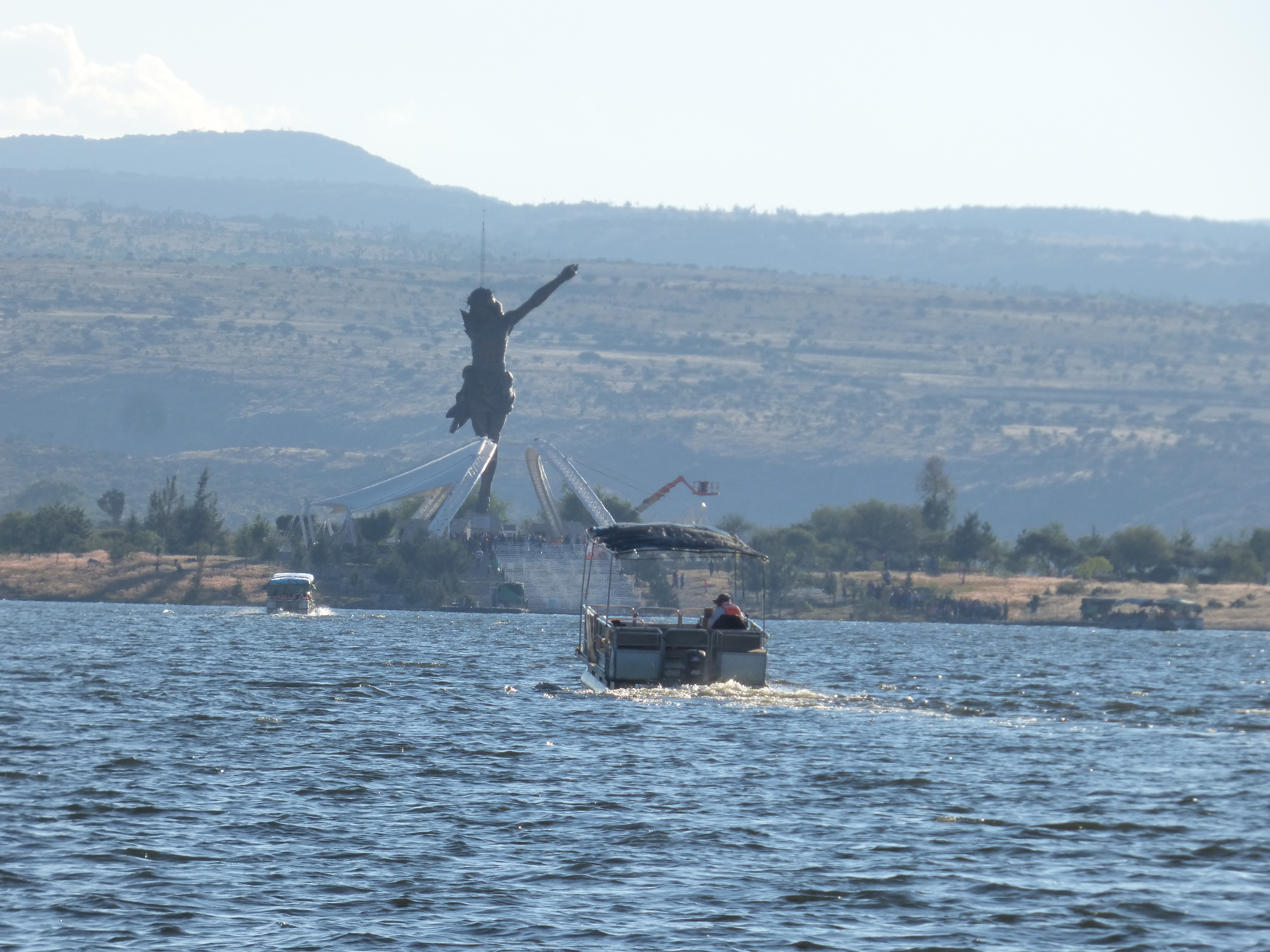
Boat approaching the Sanctuary of the Broken Christ, Aguascalientes

Historically the Catholic Church in Mexico is the oldest established church, established in the early sixteenth century. At independence, the Catholic Church kept its status as the only permissible church in Mexico. In the mid-nineteenth century, Mexican liberals curtailed the exclusive standing of the church, and Protestant missionaries, mainly from the United States, legally evangelized in Mexico. Other Christian denominations have grown in Mexico, dating from the twentieth century. With the growth of immigration from the Middle East, Eastern Catholic churches were established. Evangelical Protestant churches have expanded their reach significantly from the late twentieth century.

==== Catholicism ====
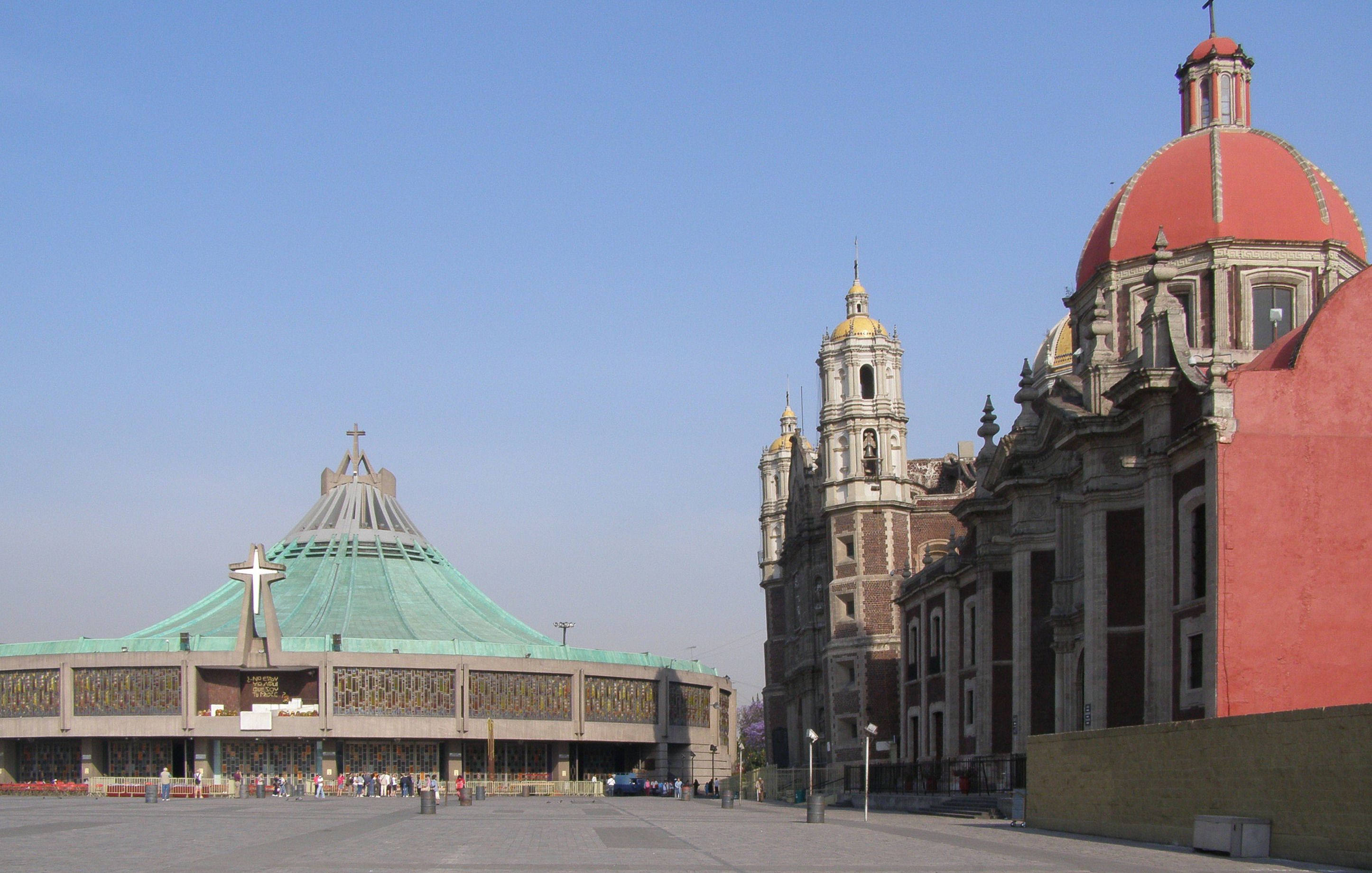
The Basilica of Our Lady of Guadalupe is one of the most important pilgrimage sites of Christianity.

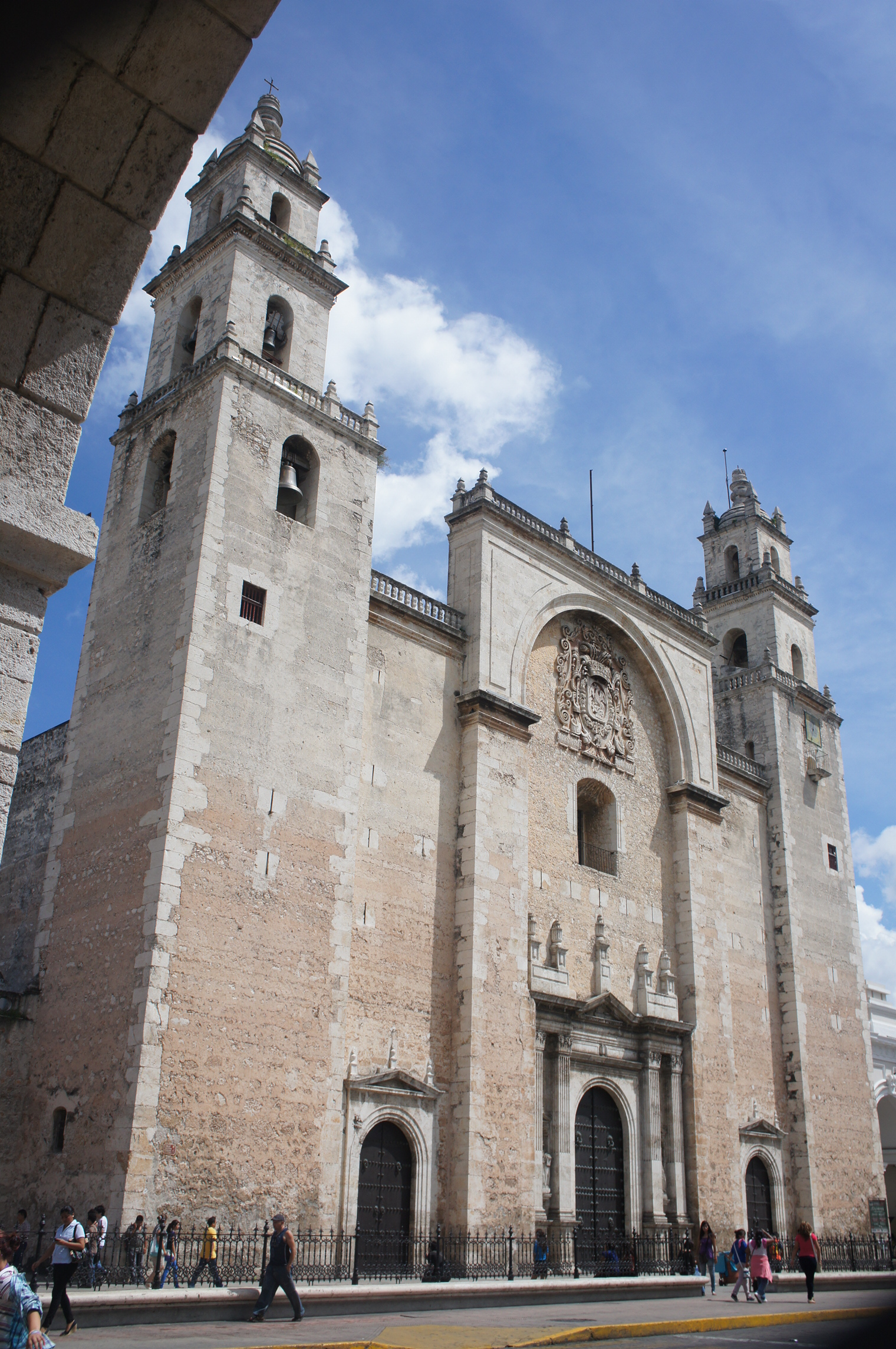
The Catedral de San Ildefonso in Mérida, Yucatán, is the oldest cathedral on the mainland Americas.

Catholics are 77.8% of the total population, down from 82.7% in 2000 and 96% in 1970. The number of Mexican Catholics has fallen by 5% in the first decade of the 21st century and in the south-east Catholics make up less than two-thirds of the population. In absolute terms, Mexico has 90,224,559 Catholics, which is the world's second largest number of Catholics, surpassed only by Brazil.

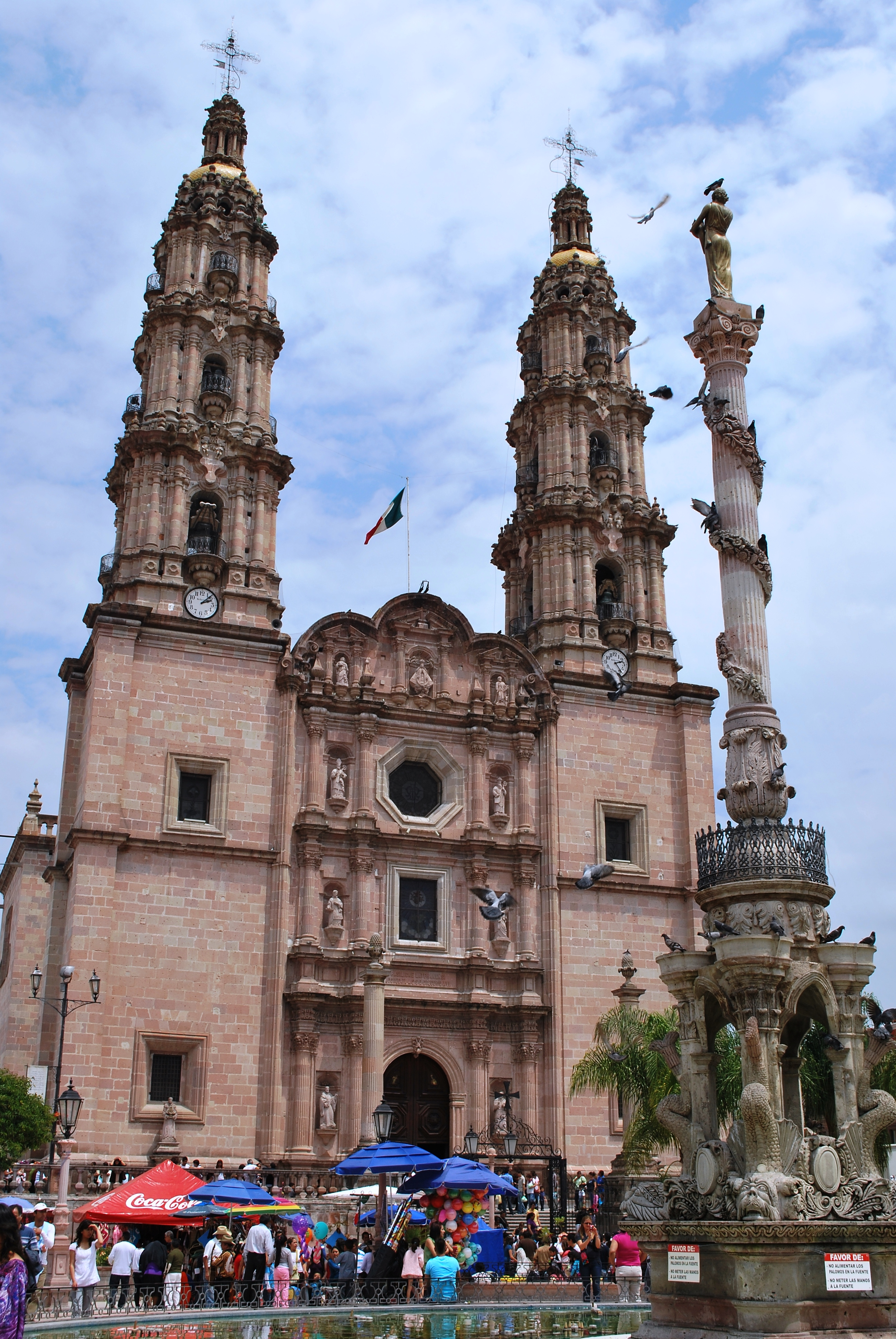
The Cathedral Basilica of Our Lady of St. John of the Lakes in Jalisco is one of the most visited pilgrimage shrines in Mexico.

There are major festivities in Mexico celebrating the Christian holidays of Epiphany (6 January) (Día de los Reyes Magos), All Saints' day (1 November), All Souls' day or Day of the Dead (2 November) (Día de los fieles difuntos), and the feast of Our Lady of Guadalupe (12 December). These are not public holidays in Mexico. Christmas is celebrated as a religious and public holiday.

===== Eastern Catholicism =====
There are also Eastern Catholic Churches that exist alongside the Latin Church in Mexico, all of which are in communion with the pope. The Vatican II document, "Orientalium Ecclesiarum" (Of Eastern Churches), proclaimed that "Eastern Catholic communities are true Churches and not just rites within the Catholic Church." Carlos Slim, for example, is a Maronite Catholic and a member of the Maronite Church.

- the Maronite Catholic Eparchy of Our Lady of the Martyrs of Lebanon in Mexico
- the Melkite Greek Catholic Eparchy of Nuestra Señora del Paraíso in Mexico City
- the Armenian Catholic Apostolic Exarchate of Latin America and Mexico

==== Protestantism ====
About 11% of the population (6,160,000 people over the age of 5, according to the 2000 census, including Jehovah's Witnesses and Mormons who are usually considered to be non-Protestant and part of Restorationism or individual Christian branches) are Protestant, of whom Pentecostals and Charismatics (called Neo-Pentecostals in the census), are the largest group. The Asambleas de Dios (Assemblies of God) is the largest Pentecostal denomination in Mexico, with more than 6,000 churches and over 1 million members.The Anglican Communion is represented by the Anglican Church of Mexico.

Protestantism is strongest where the Catholic Church and the Mexican state have little presence, and accounts for over 10% of the population in the four states that border heavily-Protestant Guatemala: Campeche, Chiapas, Quintana Roo, and Tabasco. It is also sizable in the Mexican states that border the U.S. State of Texas. Protestantism had been on the rise as it offers a less legalistic and hierarchical version of Christianity. But in some recent surveys like Latinobarometro, Protestantism in the whole country has dropped from nearly 10% to less than 5%, in counterpart, between 2010 and 2020, the Census recorder an increase from 8% to 11%, ARDA estimated 10.7% in 2015.

===== Seventh-day Adventistism =====
There are also a number of Seventh-day Adventists (488,946 people).

==== Eastern Orthodoxy ====
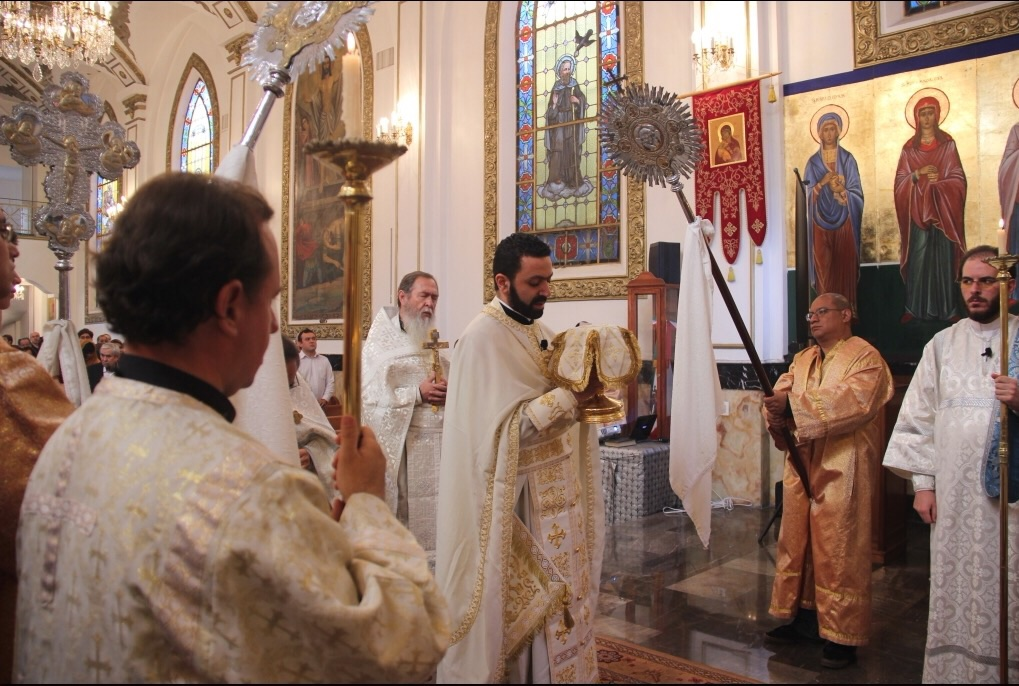
A service at the Catedral Ortodoxa de San Jorge in Colonia Roma, Mexico City. Part of the Greek Orthodox Church of Antioch, it is under the auspices of Archbishop Antonio Chedraoui (es).

There are some Mexicans practicing Eastern Orthodoxy in Mexico, mainly foreign-born people. The Orthodox Church in America has a diocese in Mexico established through mass conversions, as well as through immigration and missionary activity. The Greek Orthodox Church of Antioch also has a presence in Mexico, through its Antiochian Orthodox Archdiocese of Mexico, Venezuela, Central America and the Caribbean.

==== Jehovah's Witnesses ====
The 2000 national census counted more than one million Jehovah's Witnesses. According to the Jehovah's Witnesses official figures for 2014 there were over 800,000 members involved in preaching.

==== The Church of Jesus Christ of Latter-day Saints ====
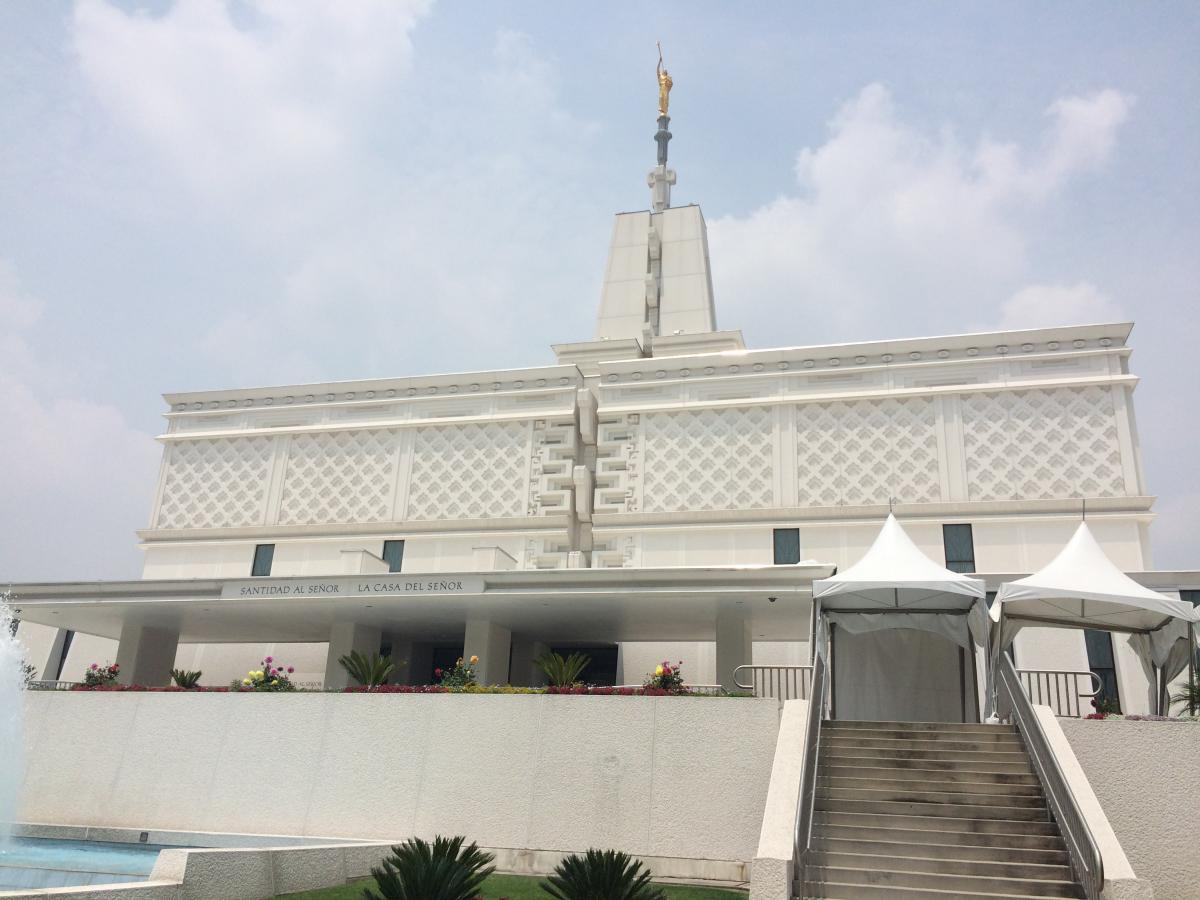
LDS Mexico City Mexico Temple

The first LDS missionaries in Mexico arrived in 1875 (although the original Mormons came to Mexico in the 1840s in Utah, when it was a Mexican territory). In 1885, 400 Mormon colonists moved to Mexico. In 1993 the Mexican government formally registered the LDS Church. This allowed the church to own property in Mexico.

The 2010 Census reported 314,932 Mormons. As of 2025, The Church of Jesus Christ of Latter-day Saints (LDS Church) claims 1,534,058 members, 1,878 congregations, and 14 temples in Mexico.

==== La Luz del Mundo ====
La Luz del Mundo is a Charismatic Christian denomination with international headquarters in Guadalajara, Jalisco, Mexico. Its flagship church in Guadalajara is said to be the largest non-Catholic house of worship in Latin America.

=== Judaism ===
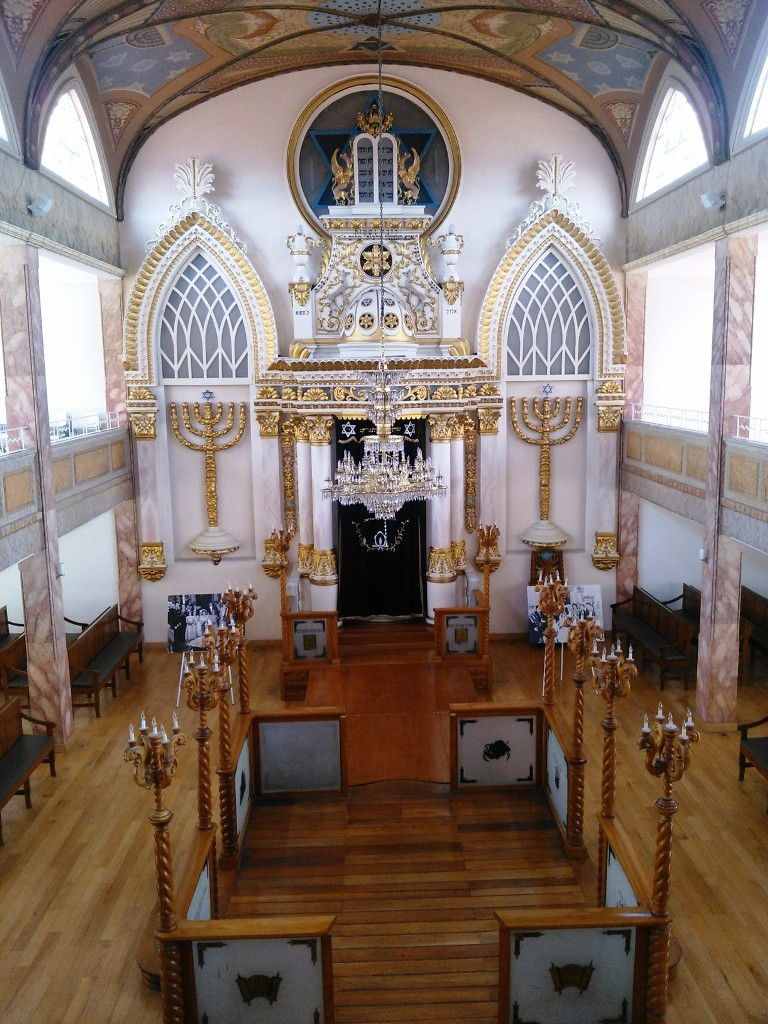
The interior of the Sinagoga Histórica Justo Sierra 71 located in the Historic Center of Mexico City.

The presence of Jews in Mexico dates back to 1521, when Hernán Cortés conquered the Aztecs, accompanied by several Conversos. According to the last national census by the INEGI, there are now more than 67,000 Mexican Jews, roughly 95% of whom live in the Greater Mexico City area.

=== Islam ===
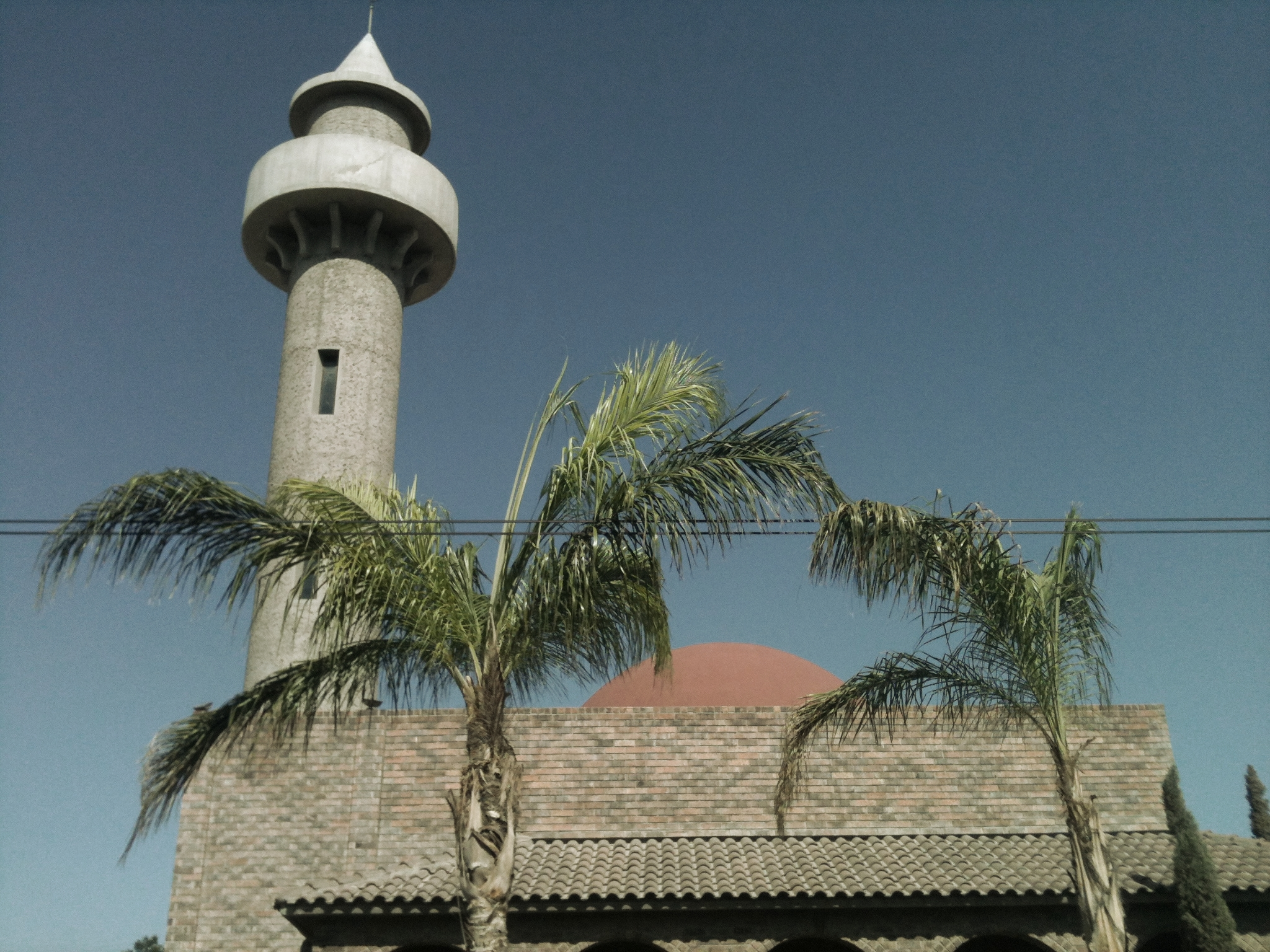
Mezquita Soraya, the first mosque in Mexico

The 2020 census estimated that there were 7,982 Muslims in Mexico. Islam is mainly practiced by Lebanese Mexicans and other Arab Mexicans, with only a few non-Arab Mexicans. There is also a growing population of Muslims among indigenous populations in Chiapas.

=== Baháʼí Faith ===
The Baháʼí Faith in Mexico began with visits of Bahá'ís before 1916. In 1919 letters from the head of the religion, `Abdu'l-Bahá, were published mentioning Mexico as one of the places Bahá'ís should take the religion to. Following further pioneers moving there and making contacts the first Mexican to join the religion was in 1937, followed quickly by the first Bahá'í Local Spiritual Assembly of all Latin America being elected in 1938.

With continued growth the National Spiritual Assembly was first elected in 1961. The Association of Religion Data Archives (relying on World Christian Encyclopedia) estimated almost 38,000 Bahá'ís in 2005.

== Dharmic religions ==
=== Buddhism ===
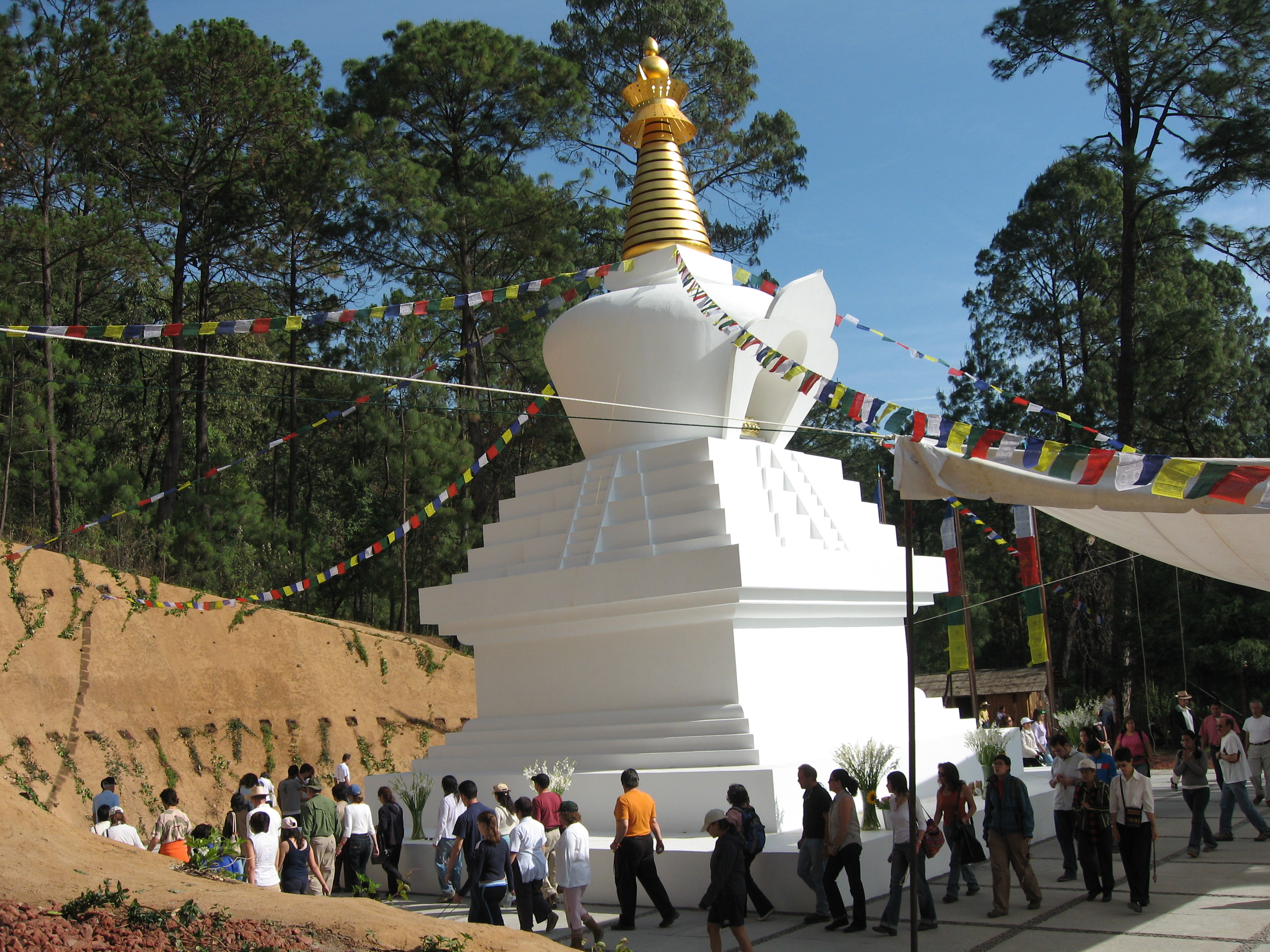
A Tibetan Buddhist ritual in Valle de Bravo

Approximately 108,701 Buddhists are counted in Mexico. Also one of six Tibet Houses in the world – Casa Tibet México – is located in Mexico City. It is used by the Dalai Lama and other leaders of Tibetan Buddhism to preserve and share Tibetan culture and spirituality. Alejandro Jodorowsky has stated that he discovered Zen Buddhism in the 1960s while in Mexico.

There are also two institutions from Theravada Buddhism tradition, the Theravada Buddhist Monastery and the Vipassana House of Meditation. There are at least 30 Buddhist groups in Mexico.

=== Hinduism ===
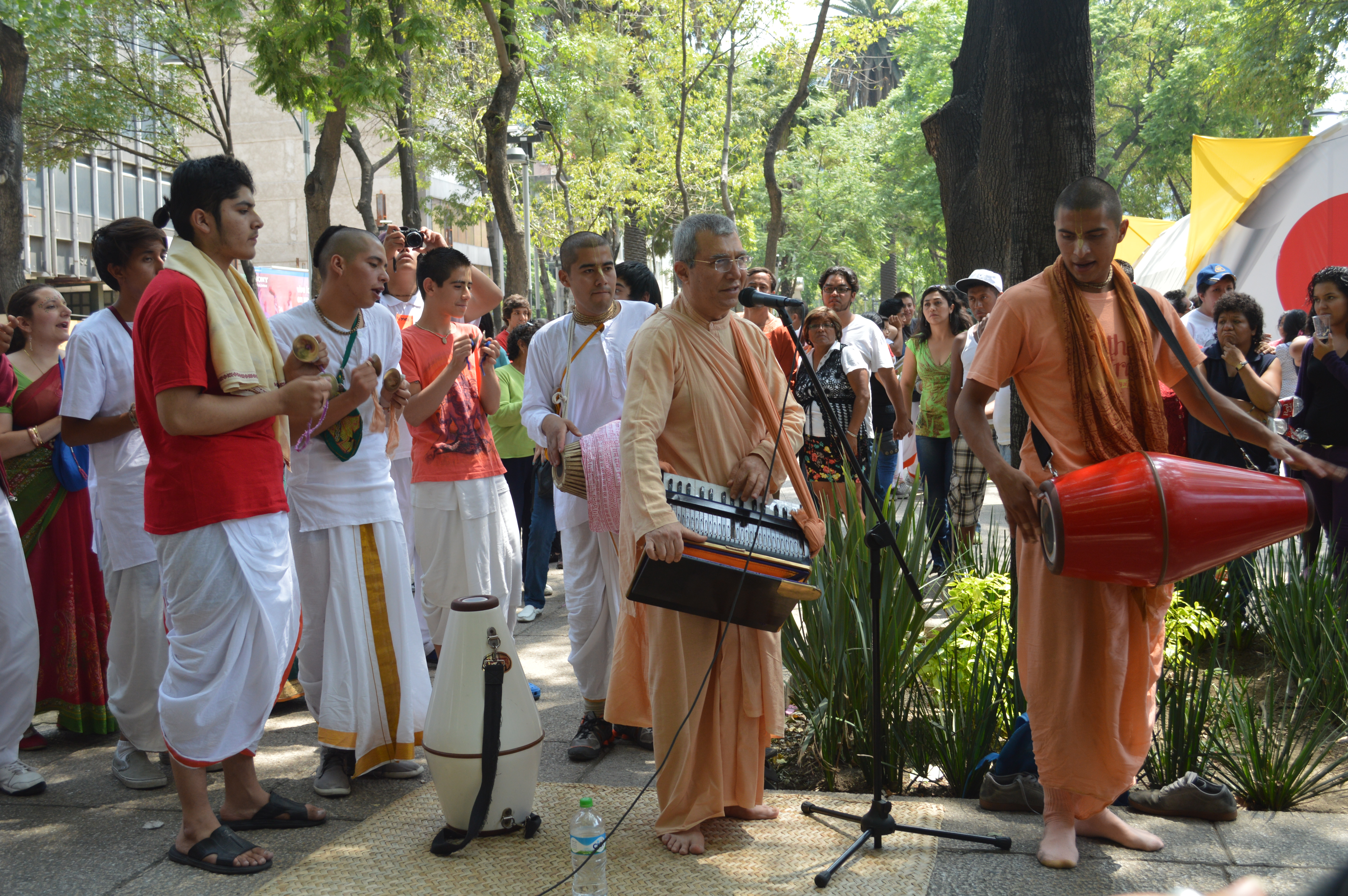
Hare Krishna musicians in Mexico City

There are about 800 Indian families in Mexico, constituting about 900 NRIs. Most of them are recent arrivals in the country. There is an important presence of recently arrived Indians working for Tata Consultancy Services in Guadalajara, Querétaro and Mexico City. Mexico has a non-discriminatory policy with regard to the grant of its citizenship. The spouse of a Mexican national would generally not face any problem in acquiring local citizenship. But although quite a few NRIs have married Mexicans, they have retained their Indian citizenship (India doesn't allow dual citizenship). A Sai Baba temple and a Vaishnav temple have been constructed in Mexico City by the Sangam Organisation.

=== Sikhism ===
There are around 8,000 Sikhs in Mexico. Most of them are of Punjabi origin.

== Nonreligious ==
It's important to specify that irreligion and atheism in Mexico is complex to measure because many Catholics and part of Protestants leads a secular life patterns, and some religious studies with a particular purpose can reports differents percent of unaffiliated people, the National Census in 2010 reported 4.7% having no religion. However, according to INEGI, the number of atheists grows annually by 5.2%, while the number of Catholics grows by 1.7%.

The majority of the population is theistic but religious participation has declined. Recent surveys have shown that around 3% of Catholics attend church daily and 44% attend church at least once a week.

== Census information ==
Religion according to the Census (2010)
| Religion | Numbers | Percent |
|---|---|---|
| Catholic | 92,924,489 | 82.72 |
| Anabaptist/Mennonites (Note: The 2010 census groups Anabaptists, Baptists, Church of the Nazarene, Methodist, Presbyterian as historic Protestant (Protestante histórica o reformada) with a total number of 820,744 (0.73%).) | 10,753 | 0.01 |
| Baptist | 252,874 | 0.23 |
| Church of the Nazarene | 40,225 | 0.04 |
| Methodist | 25,370 | 0.02 |
| Presbyterian | 437,690 | 0.39 |
| Other historic Protestant | 53,832 | 0.05 |
| Pentecostal (Note: The 2010 census groups Pentecostal with Other Christian Evangelical (Pentecostal/Cristiana/Evangélica) for a total number of 7,565,463 (6.73%).) | 1,782,021 | 1.59 |
| Other Christian Evangelical | 5,783,442 | 5.15 |
| Seventh day Adventist (Note: The 2010 census groups Seventh day Adventists, Mormons, and Jehovah's Witnesses together (Bíblica diferente de Evangélica) with a total of 2,537,896 (2.26%).) | 661,878 | 0.59 |
| Mormons | 314,932 | 0.28 |
| Jehovah's Witnesses | 1,561,086 | 1.39 |
| Eastern religions | 18,185 | 0.02 |
| Judaism | 67,476 | 0.06 |
| Islam | 3,760 | < 0.01 |
| Native religions | 27,839 | 0.02 |
| Spiritualism | 35,995 | 0.03 |
| Other religions | 19,636 | 0.02 |
| No religion | 5,262,546 | 4.68 |
| Not specified | 3,052,509 | 2.72 |
Notes

Population in terms of religion by state (2000)
| State | Catholic | Protestant and Evangelical | Other Christian | Jewish | Other | None | Not specified |
|---|---|---|---|---|---|---|---|
| Aguascalientes | 95.6% | 1.9% | 0.7% | <0.1% | 0.1% | 0.8% | 0.7% |
| Baja California | 81.4% | 7.9% | 2.7% | <0.1% | 0.2% | 6.2% | 1.6% |
| Baja California Sur | 89.0% | 4.0% | 1.9% | <0.1% | 0.2% | 3.6% | 0.1% |
| Campeche | 71.3% | 13.2% | 4.7% | <0.1% | 1.7% | 9.9% | 0.8% |
| Chiapas | 63.8% | 13.9% | 9.0% | <0.1% | <0.1% | 13.1% | 1.2% |
| Chihuahua | 84.6% | 7.1% | 2.0% | <0.1% | 0.1% | 5.1% | 1.1% |
| Coahuila | 86.4% | 6.8% | 1.8% | <0.1% | 0.1% | 3.8% | 1.1% |
| Colima | 93.0% | 2.9% | 1.4% | <0.1% | 0.1% | 1.8% | 0.8% |
| Durango | 90.4% | 3.9% | 1.8% | <0.1% | <0.1% | 2.9% | 0.9% |
| Mexico City | 90.5% | 3.6% | 1.3% | 0.2% | 0.8% | 2.9% | 0.7% |
| Guanajuato | 96.4% | 1.3% | 0.7% | <0.1% | 0.1% | 0.7% | 0.7% |
| Guerrero | 89.2% | 4.4% | 2.0% | <0.1% | 0.4% | 3.1% | 0.9% |
| Hidalgo | 90.1% | 5.2% | 1.3% | <0.1% | 0.4% | 1.6% | 0.7% |
| Jalisco | 95.4% | 2.0% | 0.9% | <0.1% | <0.1% | 0.9% | 0.7% |
| Mexico | 91.2% | 3.8% | 1.6% | 0.1% | 0.7% | 1.8% | 0.8% |
| Michoacán | 94.8% | 1.9% | 1.1% | <0.1% | 0.2% | 1.3% | 0.8% |
| Morelos | 83.6% | 7.3% | 3.1% | 0.1% | 0.5% | 4.3% | 1.0% |
| Nayarit | 91.8% | 3.0% | 1.3% | <0.1% | 0.2% | 2.9% | 0.7% |
| Nuevo León | 87.9% | 6.2% | 2.0% | <0.1% | 0.1% | 2.8% | 0.9% |
| Oaxaca | 84.8% | 7.8% | 2.3% | <0.1% | 0.2% | 4.0% | 0.9% |
| Puebla | 91.6% | 4.3% | 1.4% | <0.1% | 0.4% | 1.4% | 0.8% |
| Querétaro | 95.3% | 1.9% | 0.9% | <0.1% | 0.2% | 0.9% | 0.8% |
| Quintana Roo | 73.2% | 11.2% | 4.6% | <0.1% | 0.2% | 9.6% | 1.1% |
| San Luis Potosí | 92.0% | 4.6% | 1.0% | <0.1% | 0.2% | 1.5% | 0.7% |
| Sinaloa | 86.8% | 2.9% | 2.0% | <0.1% | <0.1% | 7.1% | 1.0% |
| Sonora | 87.9% | 4.8% | 1.8% | <0.1% | <0.1% | 4.4% | 1.1% |
| Tabasco | 70.4% | 13.6% | 5.0% | <0.1% | <0.1% | 10.0% | 0.8% |
| Tamaulipas | 82.9% | 8.7% | 2.4% | <0.1% | 0.2% | 4.9% | 1.0% |
| Tlaxcala | 93.4% | 2.9% | 1.4% | <0.1% | 0.4% | 1.0% | 0.9% |
| Veracruz | 82.9% | 6.9% | 3.3% | <0.1% | 0.2% | 5.9% | 0.8% |
| Yucatán | 84.3% | 8.4% | 3.0% | <0.1% | 0.1% | 3.5% | 0.8% |
| Zacatecas | 95.1% | 1.9% | 1.0% | <0.1% | <0.1% | 1.1% | 0.8% |
| Mexico total | 87.99% | 5.20% | 2.07% | 0.05% | 0.31% | 3.52% | 0.86% |

== Freedom of religion ==
The Constitution of Mexico and other laws establish and protect the freedom of religion in Mexico; religious instruction is prohibited in public schools, but religious groups are allowed to maintain private schools.

Religious groups may not own or administer broadcast radio or television stations and government permission is required for commercial broadcast radio or television to transmit religious programming.

In 2023, the country was scored 4 out of 4 for religious freedom.
