= Orthodox Church in America Diocese of the South =

Diocese of the Orthodox Church in America

Diocese of the South

Orthodox

Location
- Country: United States of America
- Territory: Alabama, Arkansas, Florida, Georgia, Kentucky, Louisiana, Mississippi, New Mexico, North Carolina, Oklahoma, South Carolina, Tennessee, Texas, and Virginia

Statistics
- Population: Total: 8800
- Parishes: 93

Current leadership
- Patriarch: Tikhon (Mollard)
- Metropolitan: Gerasim (Eliel)

Map
- The states in which the Diocese of the South has jurisdiction.

Website
- https://dosoca.org/

The Diocese of the South is a diocese of the Orthodox Church in America (OCA). Its territory includes parishes, monasteries, and missions located in fourteen states in the Southern and Southwestern United States – Alabama, Arkansas, Florida, Georgia, Kentucky, Louisiana, Mississippi, New Mexico, North Carolina, Oklahoma, South Carolina, Tennessee, Texas, and Virginia.

The diocesan chancery is located in Dallas, Texas. The Diocese's episcopal seat is Saint Seraphim Cathedral (Dallas, Texas) with Christ the Saviour Cathedral (Miami Lakes, Florida) as a co-cathedral.

== History ==
Archbishop Dmitri Royster was the first and only ruling bishop of the Diocese of the South from 1978 until his retirement on March 31, 2009. Archbishop Nikon of Boston, New England, and the Albanian Archdiocese initially served as locum tenens. From March 21, 2015, Metropolitan Tikhon Archbishop of Washington, Metropolitan of All American and Canada served as locum tenens with Bishop Gerasim (Eliel) of Ft. Worth as the Diocesan Administrator. In March 29, 2016, Archbishop Alexander (Golitzin), the current ruling bishop of the Bulgarian Diocese, was elected by the Holy Synod to be the ruling bishop of the Diocese of the South, in addition to his current diocese. Archbishop Alexander stayed in this position until Patriarch Tikhon announced that Alexander will retire on 23 July, 2026.

In 2020, the diocese has roughly 8800 total attendees across 93 parishes.

== Deaneries ==
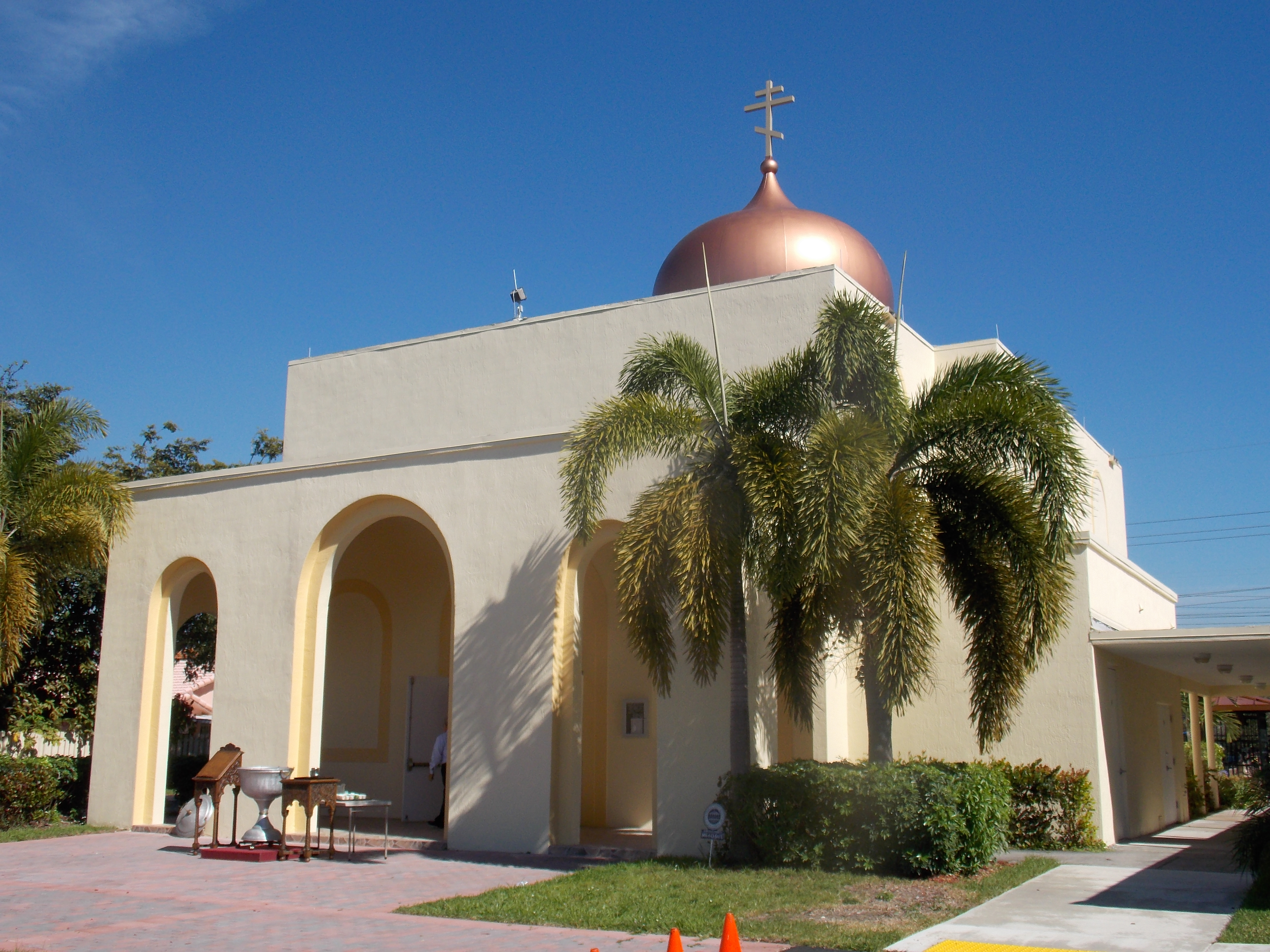
Christ the Saviour Orthodox Cathedral in Miami Lakes, Florida

The diocese is grouped geographically into seven deaneries, each consisting of a number of parishes. Each deanery is headed by a parish priest, known as a dean. The deans coordinate activities in their area's parishes, and report to the diocesan bishop. The current deaneries of the Diocese of the South and their territories are:

- Appalachian Deanery – Kentucky, Tennessee, and Virginia
- Carolina Deanery – North Carolina and South Carolina
- North Florida Deanery – Florida
- South Florida Deanery – Florida
- Mississippi River Deanery - Arkansas, Louisiana, Mississippi, Tennessee, and Texas
- Southcentral Deanery – New Mexico, Oklahoma, and Texas
- Southeastern Deanery – Alabama and Georgia

== Episcopacy ==
- Dmitri (Royster) 1978–2009
  - Jonah (Paffhausen) locum tenens 2009–2011
  - Nikon (Liolin), locum tenens 2011–2016
- Alexander (Golitzin) 2016–2026
  - Gerasim (Eliel) 2026-present
