= Alejo Pacheco-Vera =

Orthodox bishop of Mexico (born 1954)

His Eminence Alejo
- Archbishop of Mexico
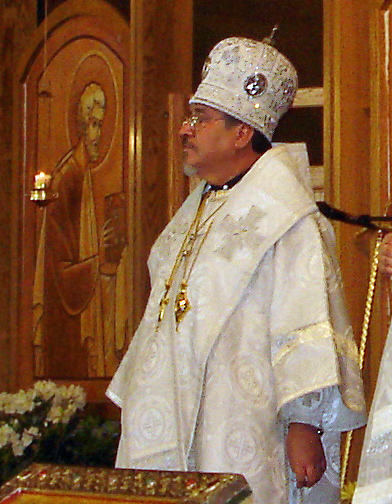
- Alejo in 2011
- Church: Orthodox Church in America
- Archdiocese: Orthodox Church in America Diocese of Mexico
- See: Mexico City
- Installed: January 18, 2009
- Predecessor: Dmitri (Royster)
- Successor: Incumbent

Orders
- Ordination: January 14, 1979 (deaconate); March 1, 1981 (priesthood)
- Consecration: May 28, 2005

Personal details
- Born: September 6, 1954 (age 72) Mexico City
- Denomination: Eastern Orthodox

Alejo (born Antonio Pacheco Vera; September 6, 1954) is a Mexican Christian prelate who has served as Archbishop of Mexico in the Orthodox Church in America since 2005.

== Early life ==
Bishop Alejo was born Antonio Pacheco Vera in 1954 in Mexico. He was received into the Orthodox faith on August 1, 1972. Six years later, he was tonsured a monk and took on the name Alejo; he was ordained a deacon on January 14, 1979 and was assigned to the Ascension Cathedral in Mexico City. He was ordained a priest in March 1, 1981, continuing to serve the cathedral while also sent on numerous missions throughout the state of Chiapas. In 2001, he was elevated to the rank of igumen and to archimandrite in 2003.

== Bishop of Mexico ==
Following the death of Bishop José Cortes y Olmos of Mexico City, Alejo was elected as Bishop of Mexico City in April 2, 2005, and was consecrated May 28 of that same year. As Bishop of Mexico City, he served as auxiliary bishop to Dmitry of Dallas, and enjoyed positive relations with the Greek Orthodox Antiochian Church in America.

On October 16, 2008, Alejo was elected as Archbishop of Mexico following the death of his predecessor, Archbishop Dmitri, and was installed on January 18, 2009. With his election, the Exarch of Mexico was elevated to full diocesan status. On January 6, 2013, Archbishop Alejo invited Archbishop Benjamin of San Francisco to celebrate the Great Feast of Theophany and to celebrate the 41st anniversary of the establishment of what is now the Diocese of Mexico. On June 1, 2016 he hosted a youth conference aimed at engaging in discussions and sharing fellowship with their peers. On June 9 of that same year, during the Great Feast of the Ascension of Our Lord, Alejo hosted a meeting to discuss shared ideas for ongoing missionary work and the strengthening of the diocese’s mandate, resulting in the creation of Departments of Pastoral and Liturgy Life, of Administration, and of Vocational and Spiritual Life. In 2018, he established a mission in Tijuana.

Eastern Orthodox Church titles
Preceded by Dmitri (Royster)	Bishop of Mexico; 2009 – Present	Succeeded by Incumbent
