= Islam in Mexico =

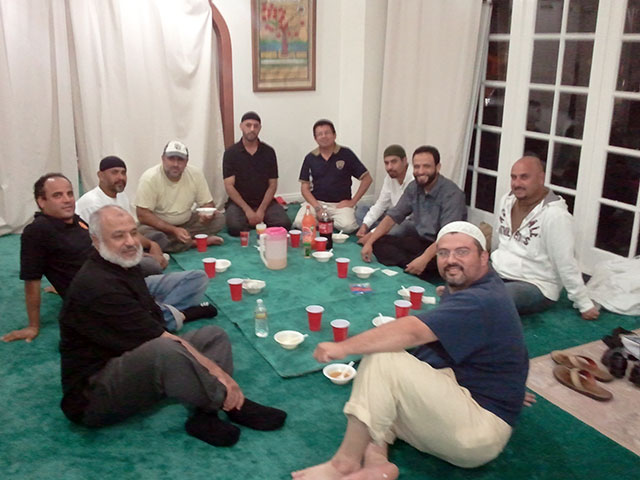
Muslims in Tijuana

Mexico has a religious minority of Muslims, mostly constituted by converts, and Mexicans of African, Asian, European, and South American origin, as well as their children, born in Mexico.

Mexico is a predominantly Christian country, with adherents of Islam representing a very small minority. But they are free to proselytize and build places of worship in the country due to the secular nature of the state, established by Mexico's constitution.

According to the 2010 INEGI census, there were only about 3,760 individuals who identified Islam as their religion. And the number of Muslims in Mexico had risen to 7,982 as of the 2020 INEGI census.

Muhammad Ruiz Al Meksiki, general director of the Salafi Center of Mexico (CSM), had estimated that in 2015, there were about 10,000 Muslims in Mexico and has been rapidly growing after due to excessive waves of mass immigration from African, Arab, and South Asian countries with a minority of Eurasian and European countries.

== History and Organizations ==
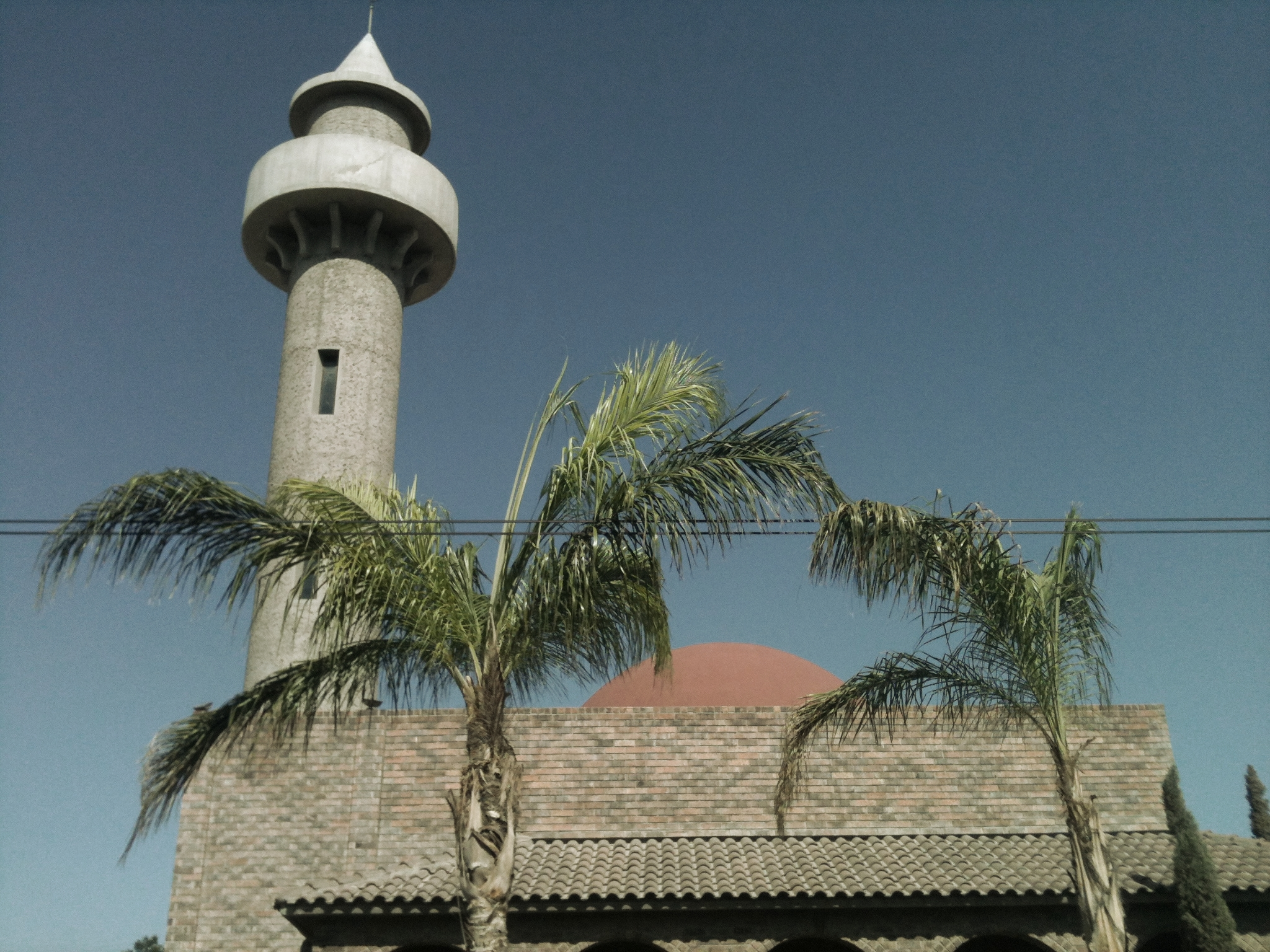
Suraya Mosque, the first mosque ever in Mexico

During the Mexican Porfiriate, there was an open policy regarding investment and migration, mainly of people of European countries.

Although, some immigrants from other countries, such as Turkey, Syria, Lebanon and Palestine, also arrived during that period.

For the most part, they were Christians escaping religious persecution of the Ottoman Empire; but there were a few Jews, some non-Sunni Muslims, and people of other religions, also immigrating into Mexico due to economic opportunity or escape from religious persecution.

The muslims who immigrated during the Porfiriate however, decided to settle down in places such as Yucatán, Veracruz, Nuevo León, Coahuila, Mexico City and Puebla; due to the economic opportunities said states had to offer.

Once there, several Islamic Organizations were formed, with most of them adhering to the Sunni Branch of Islam; however, Salafists, Shia's, and Sufi muslims also have presence and mosques of their own.

Today, most Mexican Islamic organizations focus on grassroots missionary activities, which are most effective at the community level.

The most important Islamic organizations in Mexico include:

The Educative Center of the Muslim Community In Mexico: Sunni organization, which operates in Mexico City. It runs an educational center, managed mainly by Muslims from Egypt and the Middle East, and is run by Said Louahabi.

Cultural Islamic Center of Mexico: Sunni organization headed by Omar Weston, a British-born Mexican convert to Islam, which has been active in several cities of northern and central Mexico.

In the state of Morelos, it operates a mosque, called "Dar as Salaam", and it also operates Hotel Oasis, a hotel that offers halal vacation alternatives for Muslim travelers and accommodation for non-Muslims sympathetic to Islam.

This group was the subject of a study carried out by British anthropologist Mark Lindley-Highfield, of the Department of Anthropology at the University of Aberdeen.

Musalla Al-Ajirah: Run by Muhammad Abdullah Ruiz, a former member of Cultural Islamic Center headed by Omar Weston, the Musalla is considered to be the only center of salafists in the country.

Sufi Order in Mexico City: Sufi organization, which is a Mexican branch of the Nur Ashki Jerrahi order, headed by two women, Shaykha Fatima Fariha and Shaykha Amina Teslima.

Al Hikmah Institute of Arabic Language and Culture: Sunni organization run by Isa Rojas. A Mexican convert to Islam, who studied Islam in the University of Medina, within the capital city.

Amir al-Muminin Islamic Center: Twelver Shia organization which operates in Mexico City, Mexico State, and Morelos. It hosts religious events for Mexican Shia Muslims, such as the commemoration of Muharram, Mawlid, Fatimiyya, among others.

It also provides halal food options for Mexican Muslims and educative resources for Shia's, Sunnis, and non-Muslims alike.

== Demographics ==
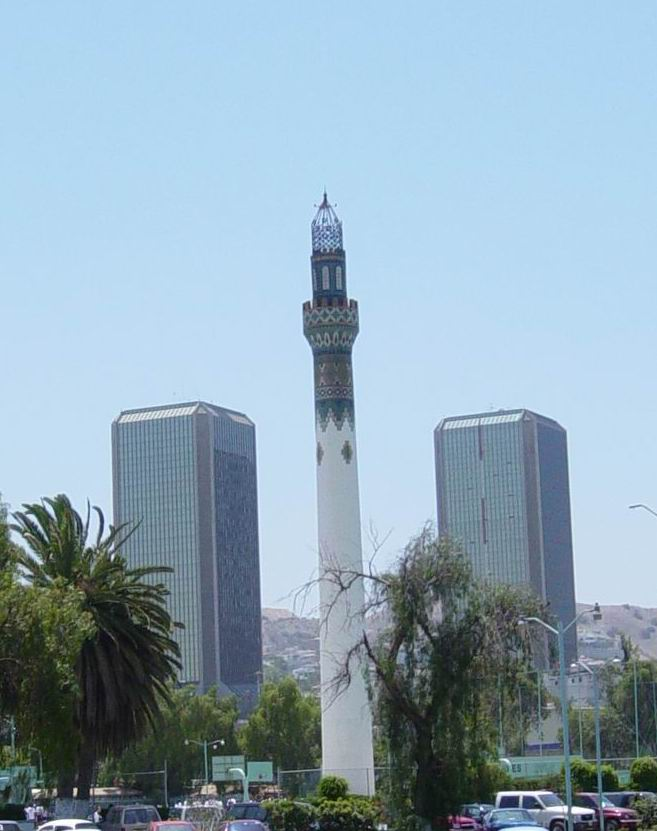
Torres and Minarete of Agua Caliente

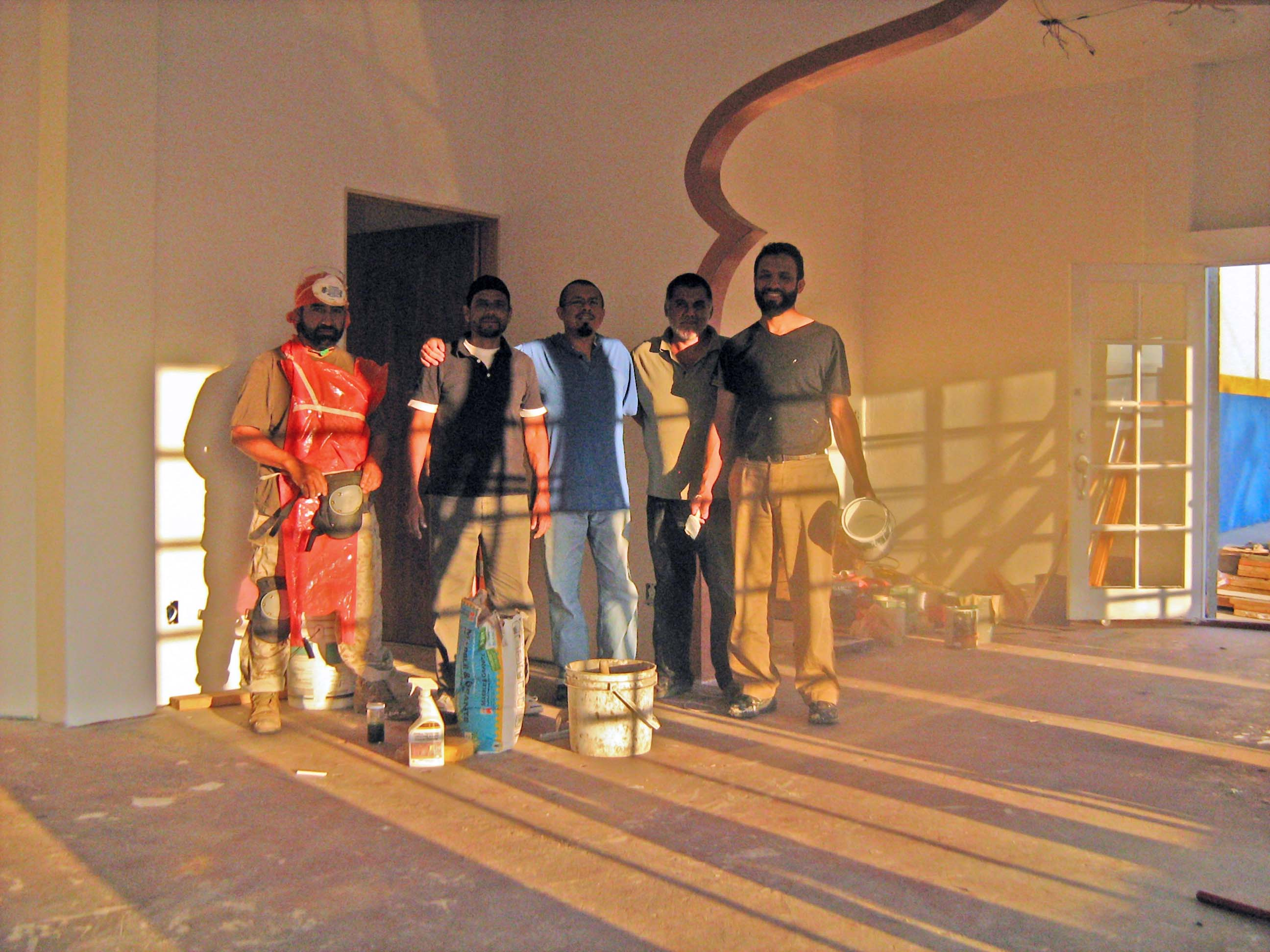
Construction Details

Islam represents a small fraction of Mexico's population; as of 2025, Pew Research Center lists Muslims as <1% of the country. While precise numbers differ, a 2019 report by the US Department of State claimed that the country had approximately 4,000 Muslims, mostly living in Mexico City and Chiapas.

The approximate number of Muslims by State goes as follows:

Federal Entity	Muslim Population (2010)
Mexico (whole country)	2,000
Aguascalientes	32
Baja California	190
Baja California Sur	20
Campeche	32
Coahuila	70
Colima	16
Chiapas	650
Chihuahua	78
Durango	34
Guanajuato	100
Guerrero	26
Hidalgo	38
Jalisco	202
México (state)	117
Michoacán	200
Morelos	98
Nayarit	15
Nuevo León	126
Oaxaca	758
Puebla	106
Querétaro	100
Quintana Roo	142
San Luis Potosí	56
Sinaloa	200
Sonora	45
Tabasco	13
Tamaulipas	63
Tlaxcala	19
Veracruz	86
Yucatán	43
Zacatecas	13
Mexico City	500

== Indigenous Muslims ==
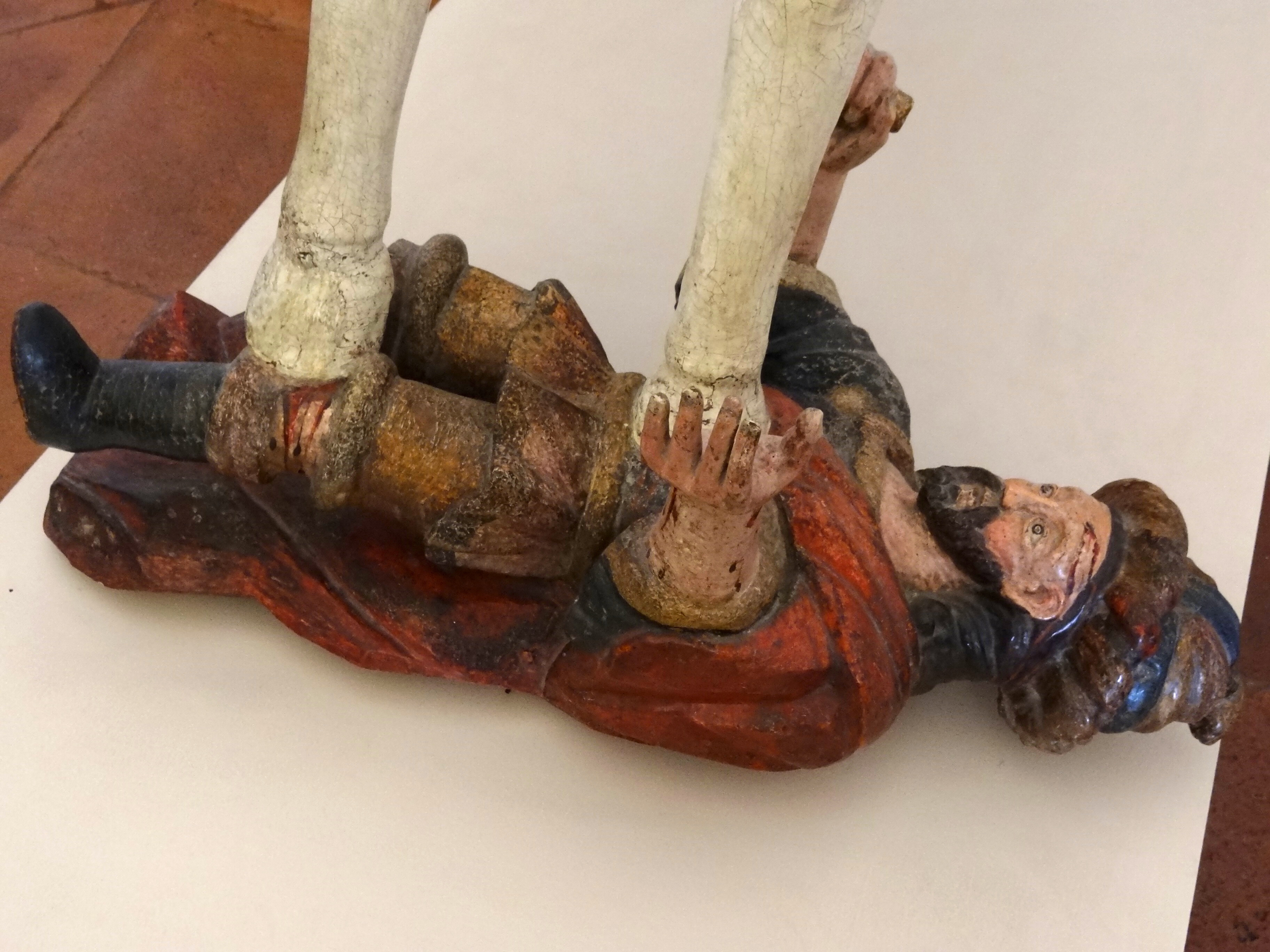
A figure of a Moor being trampled by a conquistador's horse at the National Museum of the Viceroyalty in Tepotzotlan.

Islam gained significant popularity in Indigenous communities in the 1930s due to mass Spaniard and Moroccan settlement, resulting in Mayans becoming indentured servants for the two, for some periods of time as well as business owners interbreeding with the Native women. By 1957, about 200 people of Mayan descent had been involved with Islam. This amount did not significantly rise until the late 1970s but practicing stayed stagnant within the communities.

In 1978 The Spanish Murabitun community, now based in Granada, Spain, had one of its missionaries involved in the spread of Islam throughout the 1980s and 1990s.

Muhammad Nafia (formerly Aureliano Pérez), arrived in the state of Chiapas shortly after the Zapatista uprising and established a commune in the city of San Cristóbal.

The group, characterized as anti-capitalistic, entered an ideological pact with the socialist Zapatistas group. The President Vicente Fox voiced concerns about the influence of the fundamentalism and possible connections of the Zapatistas to the Basque terrorist organization Euskadi Ta Askatasuna (ETA), but it appeared that most converts had no interest in political extremism.

By 1994, many indigenous Mayans and more than 700 Tzotzils had converted to Islam.

In San Cristóbal, the Murabitun established a pizzeria, a carpentry workshop and a Quranic school (madrasa) where children learned Arabic and prayed five times a day in the backroom of a residential building. It is reported that women in headscarves had become a common sight by then.

Nowadays, most of the Mayan Muslims have left the Murabitun and established ties with the CCIM, now following the orthodox Sunni school of Islam. They built the Al-Kausar Mosque in San Cristobal de las Casas. Nevertheless, the vast majority of Native Mexicans today are not muslims.

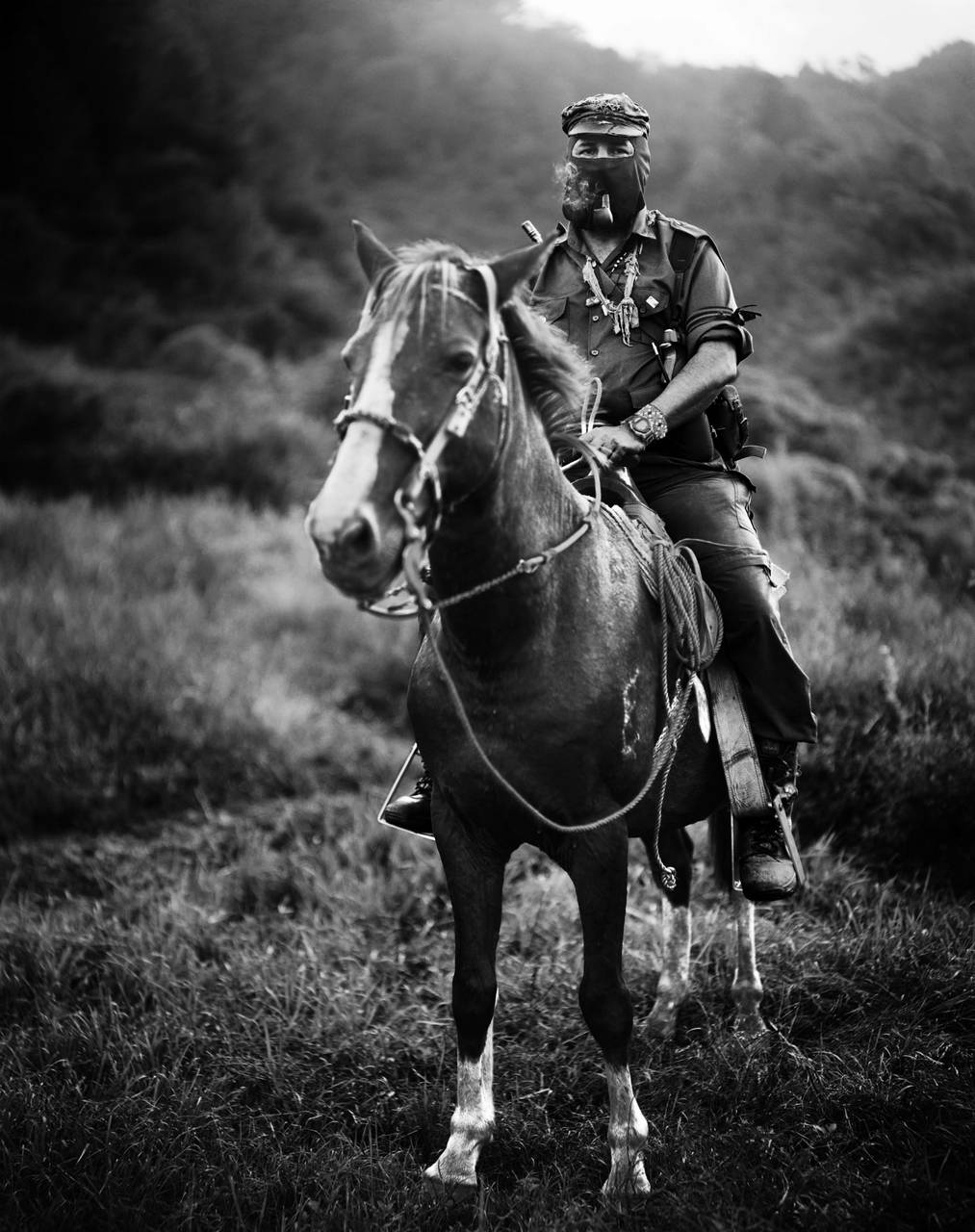
Subcomandante Marcos of the Zapatistas entered into an alliance with Chiapas Muslims in the 1980s.

== Mosques ==
This is a list of some, but by no means all mosques and Islamic meeting centers in Mexico.

- Centro Islámico del Norte. Av. Benito Juárez 603, Centro, 66230 San Pedro Garza García, N.L.
- Suraya Mosque in Torreon, Coahuila.
- Dar es Salaam Mosque in Tequesquitengo, Morelos.
- Tahaarah Mosque in Comitan, Chiapas.
- Al Kautsar Mosque in San Cristobal de las Casas, Chiapas.
- Al Medina Mosque in San Cristobal de las casas, Chiapas
- Musala Tlaxcala No. 30 San Critobal de las Casas, Chiapas
- Murabitun Mosque San Cristobal de las casa, Chiapas
- Salafi Mosque Muhammad ibn Abdul Wahab in Mexico City.
- Mezquita/ tekke de la Orden Jalveti Yerraji instituto Luz Sobre Luz in Mexico City.
- Masiid Omar, Centro Islamico Tijuana Beaches, Baja California, Mexico.
- Al-Hikmah Ciudad de México, Aragón, Mexico.
- Mezquita Euclides Euclides 25, Col. Anzures, Polanco, Ciudad de México.
- Mezquita Abu Bakr Don Luis 10, Nativitas, Benito Juàrez, Nativitas, Metro, 03500 Ciudad de México, CDMX
- Mezquita de guadalajara Centauro 2912, La Calma, 45070 Zapopan, Jal. Guadalajara.
- Musalah Al Ajirah in Margarita # 5 local, colonia Santa Maria la Ribera, Delegación Cuauhtémoc, CP 06400, Mexico City.
- Amir al Muminin, Rubens 46, colonia San Juan, Alcaldía Benito Juárez, Ciudad de México.

== Moorish architecture ==
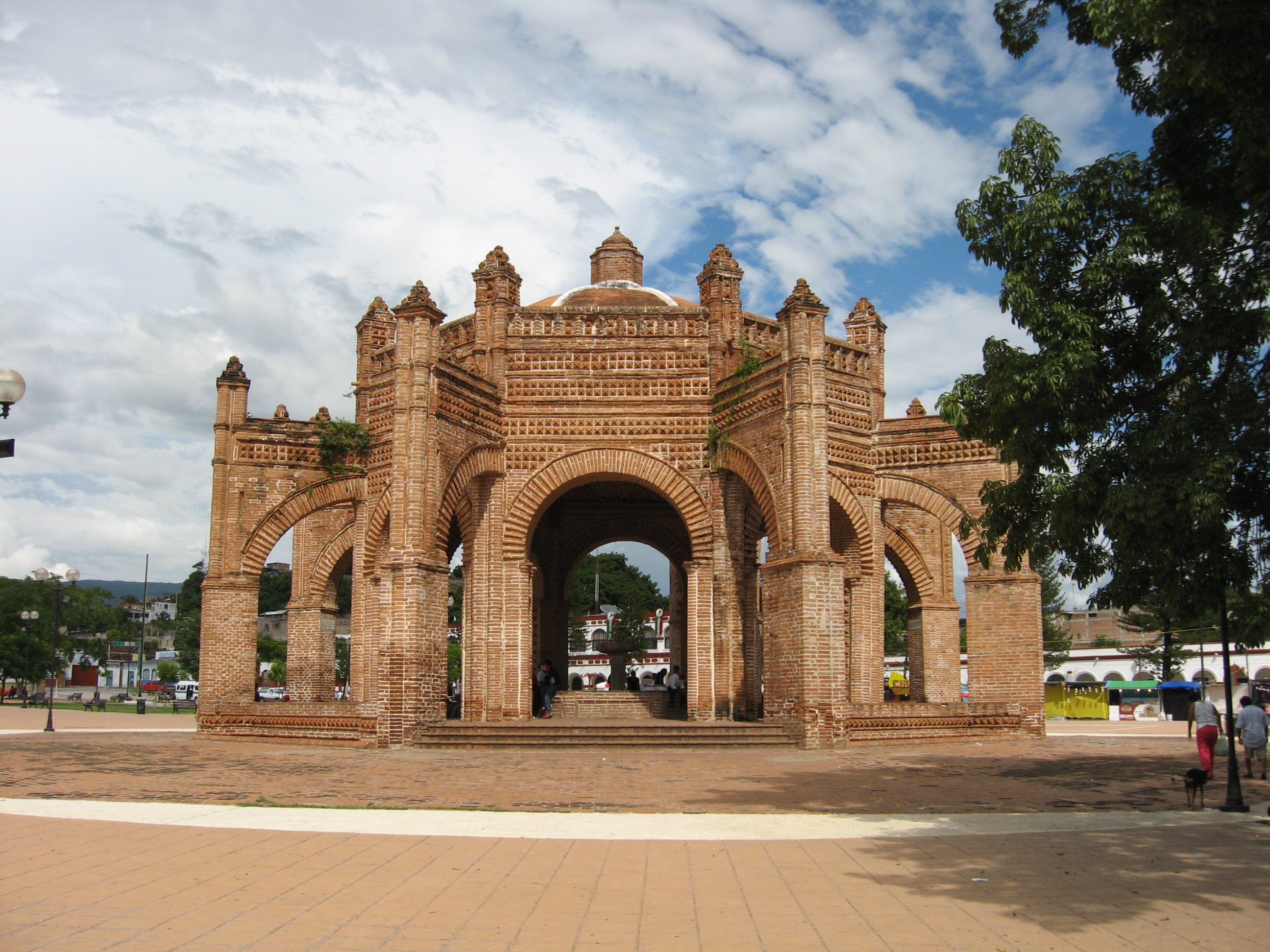
La Pila fountain in the main square of Chiapa de Corzo, Chiapas.

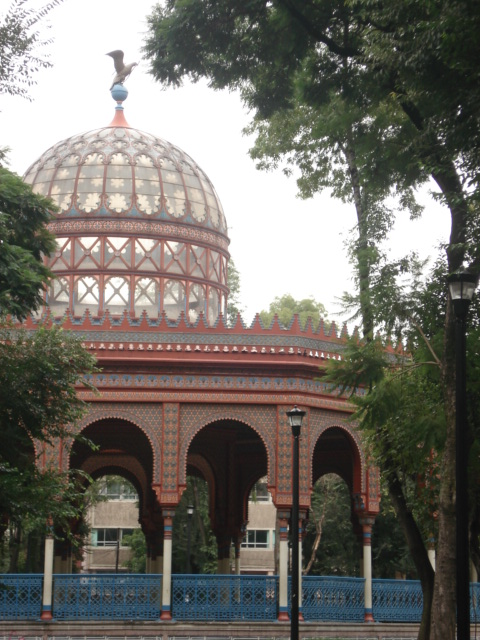
Morisco Kiosk in Colonia Santa María la Ribera neighborhood.

In Chiapa de Corzo, Chiapas, a fountain, known locally as "La Corona" or "La Pila" was built to provide the population with water.

This architectural work was built in annealed brick with a strong Mudejar influence. It was built by the Spanish Dominican friars during the Colonial era in the sixteenth century.

The Morisco Kiosk (Moorish Kiosk) in Colonia Santa María la Ribera was made by José Ramón Ibarrola for the Universal Exhibition of New Orleans from 1884 to 1885, in the neo-Mudejar style that was prevailing in Spain in the 19th century.

== Muslims living in Mexico ==
Fitra Ismu Kusumo, Indonesian artist living in Mexico.

Oussama Idrissi, Moroccan – Dutch footballer in Club de Futbol Pachuca.

== See also ==
- Latin American Muslims
- Religion in Mexico
- Latino Muslims
