= Alexander Golitzin (bishop) =

Orthodox bishop

His Eminence Alexander The Most Reverend
- Archbishop of the Bulgarian Diocese and of the South
- Archdiocese: Bulgarian Diocese; Diocese of the South
- Elected: 5 May 2012 (Bulgarian Diocese); 30 March 2016 (The South)
- Predecessor: Kyrill (Yonchev); Dmitri (Royster)
- Successor: Incumbent

Personal details
- Born: May 27, 1948 (age 78) Burbank, California
- Denomination: Eastern Orthodox
- Education: University of California, Berkeley; Saint Vladimir's Orthodox Theological Seminary; Oxford University

Alexander of Toledo (born Alexander Golitzin; 27 May 1948) is an American Christian prelate who serves as Archbishop of the Bulgarian Diocese and of Dallas and the South in the Orthodox Church in America.

== Biography ==
Alexander Yuryevich Golitzin was born in Burbank, California on 27 May 1948. Through his father he is a member of the Golitsyn family. He received a Bachelor of Arts from the University of California, Berkeley in English and received a Master of Divinity from Saint Vladimir's Seminary. He attended Oxford university in 1973, and two years in Mount Athos, obtaining his Ph.D. in 1980. He was ordained into the deaconate in July 1982, into the priesthood in 1984, and tonsured as a monk in 1986. In 1989, he taught at Marquette University in the Department of Theology, specializing in Jewish and Christian mysticism, until April 2022.

In 2011, he was elected as the Bishop of Toledo and the Bulgarian Diocese and consecrated on May 5, 2012, succeeding Archbishop Kyrill Yonchev who died in 2007. On 30 March 2016, he was elected as the Bishop of Dallas and the South, succeeding Dmitri (Royster), who had died in 2011. He is the second Archbishop of both dioceses. He was elevated to the rank of Archbishop in Spring of 2017.

On 22 July 2013, he was awarded the Order of Saint Vladimir in the second class.

On April 29, 2026, it was announced that Archbishop Alexander would retire from the administration of the Diocese of the South starting on July 23, 2026, but he would remain in charge of the Bulgarian Diocese.

== Honors and awards ==
- Order of Saint Vladimir, 2nd class

== Bibliography ==
- Alexander Golitzin (1995). The Living Witness of the Holy Mountain. South Canaan: Saint Tikhon Seminary Press. ISBN 978-1878997487.
- Alexander Golitzin (1996). New Light From the Holy Mountain. South Canaan: Saint Tikhon Seminary Press.
- Michael Prokurat, Michael D. Peterson, Alexander Golitzin (1996). The Historical Dictionary of the Orthodox Church. Lanham: Scarecrow Press. ISBN 978-0810830813.
- St. Symeon the New Theologian (1995–1997). St Symeon the New Theologian on the Mystical Life: The Ethical Discourses. Translated by Alexander Golitzin. Crestwood: St. Vladimir's Seminary Press. ISBN 978-0881411423.
- Alexander Golitzin (1998). Mistagogia: Experiența lui Dumnezeu în Ortodoxie (in Romanian). Sibiu. ISBN 973-9344-07-0.
- Andrei A. Orlov, ed. (2020). Jewish Roots of Eastern Christian Mysticism: Studies in Honor of Alexander Golitzin. Leiden: Brill. ISBN 978-9004429529.

== See also ==
- House of Golitsyn

Eastern Orthodox Church titles
Preceded by Kyrill (Yonchev)	Archbishop of the Bulgarian Diocese; 2012 – present	Succeeded by Incumbent
Preceded by Dmitri (Royster)	Archbishop of the South; 2016 – 2026	Succeeded by Incumbent
