= Orthodox Church in America Diocese of Mexico =

Diocese of the Orthodox Church in America

Diocese of Mexico (Orthodox Church in America)

Orthodox

Location
- Territory: Mexico
- Metropolitan: Tikhon (Mollard)
- Headquarters: Mexico City

Statistics
- Parishes: 20 (2026)

Information
- Denomination: Eastern Orthodox
- Rite: Byzantine Rite
- Established: 1972
- Secular priests: 1 bishop, 17 priests and 8 deacons (2023)
- Language: Spanish; English

Current leadership
- Parent church: Orthodox Church in America
- Governance: Episcopal
- Archbishop: Alejo (Pacheco-Vera)

Map
- States in which the Diocese of Mexico has jurisdiction

Website
- ocamexico.org

The Diocese of Mexico (Spanish: Diócesis de México) is a missionary diocese of the Orthodox Church in America (OCA). Its territory includes parishes, monasteries, and missions located in four states in Mexico (as well as Mexico City) - Chiapas, México, Jalisco, and Veracruz. The diocesan chancery is located in Mexico City.

In 2023, the ruling bishop of the exarchate was Alejo (Pacheco-Vera), Bishop of Mexico City.

== History ==
The history of the diocese traces back to the establishment of the Mexican Catholic Apostolic Church in the 1920s. The church separated from the Roman Catholic Church amid the revolutionary sentiments that followed the Mexican Revolution, as Roman Catholicism evoked historical associations with the Spanish colonizers. The Mexican Catholic Apostolic Church was formally established in 1926. Initially supported by the Mexican government, by 1928 it reportedly comprised 120 clergy and parishes in fourteen Mexican states. Its activities also extended to Mexican communities in Texas.

Over the following decades, as relations between the Mexican state and the Roman Catholic Church gradually normalized, the movement fragmented into several independent jurisdictions. One of these groups was led by José Cortés y Olmos, who was consecrated a bishop in 1961. His jurisdiction, known as the Iglesia Ortodoxa Catolica en Mexica, identified itself as an Old Catholic church. In 1965, Cortés y Olmos established contact with Fr. Dmitri Royster of the North American Metropolia and began a process that would eventually lead his diocese into Eastern Orthodoxy. During this period, Cortés y Olmos translated liturgical texts into Spanish.

In 1971, Cortés y Olmos petitioned for reception into the Orthodox Church in America. On 16 February 1972, the Holy Synod of the OCA established the Mexican Exarchate, incorporating five parishes under his leadership. The exarchate emerged through the reception into Orthodoxy of an entire ecclesiastical body, which some sources estimate numbered between 10,000 and 20,000 faithful. Clergy were generally received in the ranks they had previously held if they had been validly ordained in the Catholic Church. Cortés y Olmos himself was received as a presbyter and, on 22 April 1972, was consecrated auxiliary bishop of Mexico City. Following the reception of the parishes, services began to be celebrated in Spanish according to the Byzantine Rite, and iconostases were installed in the churches.

Bishop José died on 28 January 1983. Archbishop Dmitri continued to oversee the life of the Exarchate until 2005, when the Mexican-born Alejo Pacheco Vera was consecrated bishop. During this period, Dmitri served as Exarch of Mexico and played a central role in the development of Orthodox life in the country.

On 16 October 2008, the Mexican Exarchate was elevated to the status of a full diocese, with Bishop Alejo becoming its ruling hierarch. He was formally installed at Ascension Cathedral in Mexico City on 18 January 2009 and was elevated to the rank of archbishop on 9 May 2012.

By the early 2010s, the diocese comprised ten parishes, a monastic community attached to Ascension Cathedral, and several thousand faithful served by the bishop and ten priests. In January 2012, the diocese celebrated the fiftieth anniversary of Ascension Cathedral in Mexico City.

In June 2016, the Orthodox Church in America noted that missionary activity within the Diocese of Mexico had increased in recent years, particularly through the organization of short-term missions to San Esteban, Pisaflores, and other remote communities.

== List of Bishops ==
=== Mexican Exarchate ===
- Dmitri (Royster) (16 February 1972 – 16 October 2008)
- Alejo (Pacheco-Vera) (16 October 2008 – 14 January 2009)

=== Diocese of Mexico ===
- Alejo (Pacheco-Vera) (14 January 2009 – Present)

== Deaneries ==
The diocese is grouped geographically into five deaneries, each consisting of a number of parishes. Each deanery is headed by a parish priest, known as a dean. The deans coordinate activities in their area's parishes, and report to the diocesan bishop. The current deaneries of the Exarchate of Mexico are:

- Mexico City, D.F.
- State of Mexico
- State of Jalisco
- State of Veracruz
- State of Chiapas

== See also ==
- Assembly of Canonical Orthodox Bishops of Latin America
