= Suraya Mosque =

Shia mosque in Torreón, Coahuila, Mexico

- Mezquita Suraya
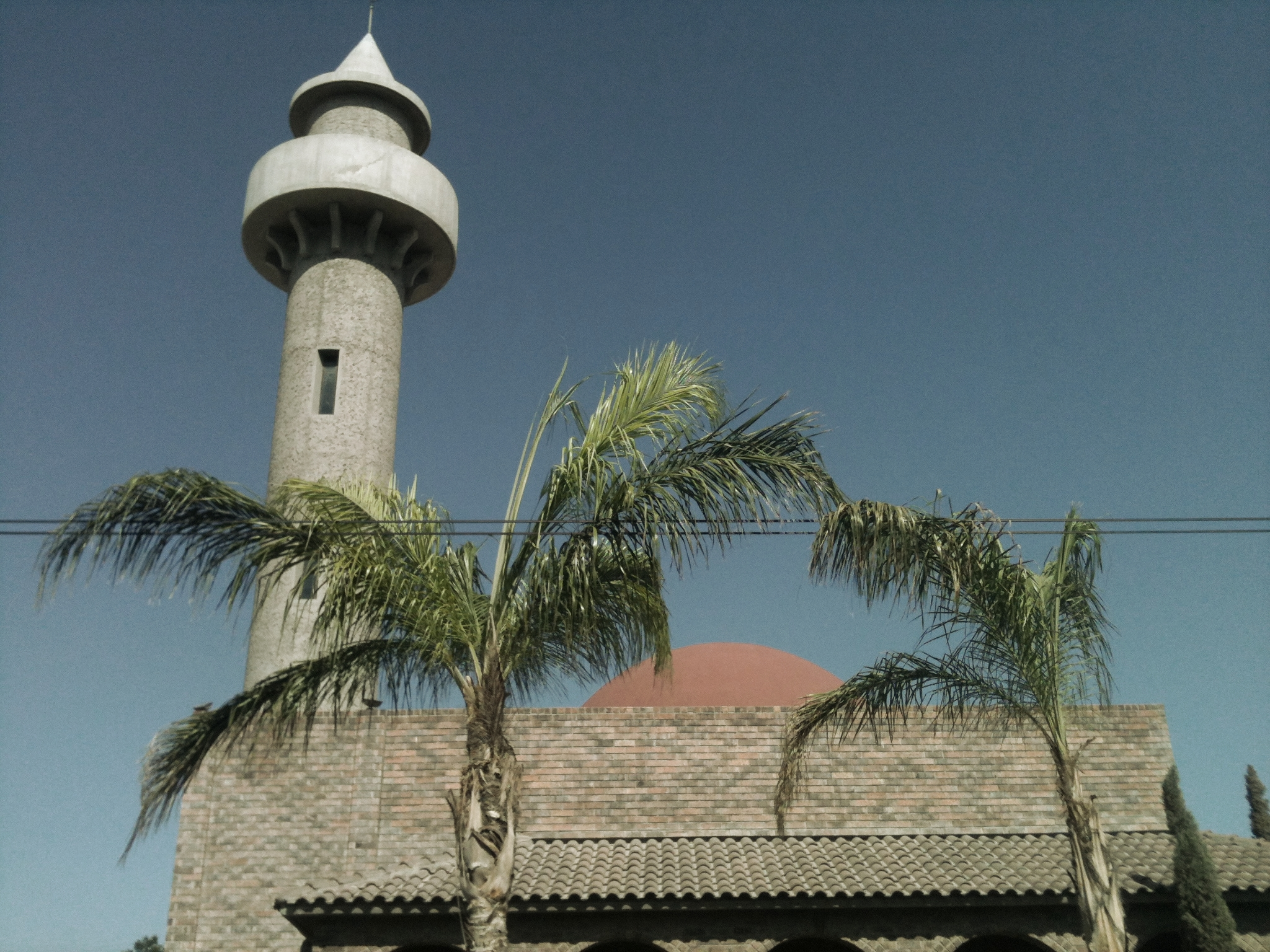

- Location of the mosque in Coahuila

Religion
- Affiliation: Shia Islam
- Ecclesiastical or organizational status: Mosque
- Status: Active

Location
- Location: Torreon, Coahuila
- Country: Mexico
- Interactive map of Suraya Mosque
- Coordinates: 25°33′36″N 103°26′26″W

Architecture
- Architect: Zain Chamut
- Type: Mosque
- Style: Mozarabic
- Groundbreaking: 1986
- Completed: 1989

Specifications
- Dome: 1
- Minaret: 1
- Minaret height: 10 m (33 ft)

Website
- surayamosque.com

The Suraya Mosque (Spanish: Mezquita Suraya) is a Shia mosque located in Torreón, Coahuila, Mexico. The mosque was completed in 1989 and was the first purpose-built mosque constructed in Mexico.

== History ==
The Suraya Mosque is the oldest mosque in Mexico. The mosque had significant influence on the political structure of the Mexican government. The mosque's administrators were expanding it and purchasing the surrounding land.

The region around Torreón has had a Middle Eastern immigrant presence since the early 20th century. However, it wasn't until 1983 that approximately 35 people, descendants of first generation immigrants, founded the first Islamic meeting house in Mexico. The meeting house was led by Hassan Zain Chamut.

One of the attendants, Elias Serhan Selim, proposed the meeting house have a dedicated place of worship built for the community. He sponsored the project and sought the expertise of architect Zain Chamut in order to design a mosque that reflected both Islamic and Hispanic architectural tradition. Construction of a mosque began in 1986 and was completed in 1989.

== See also ==
- Islam in Mexico
- List of mosques in North America
