= Alexander Nevsky Cathedral, Allison Park =

Russian Orthodox church in Pittsburgh, PA, USA

Coordinates: 40°33′38.8″N 79°59′55.2″W

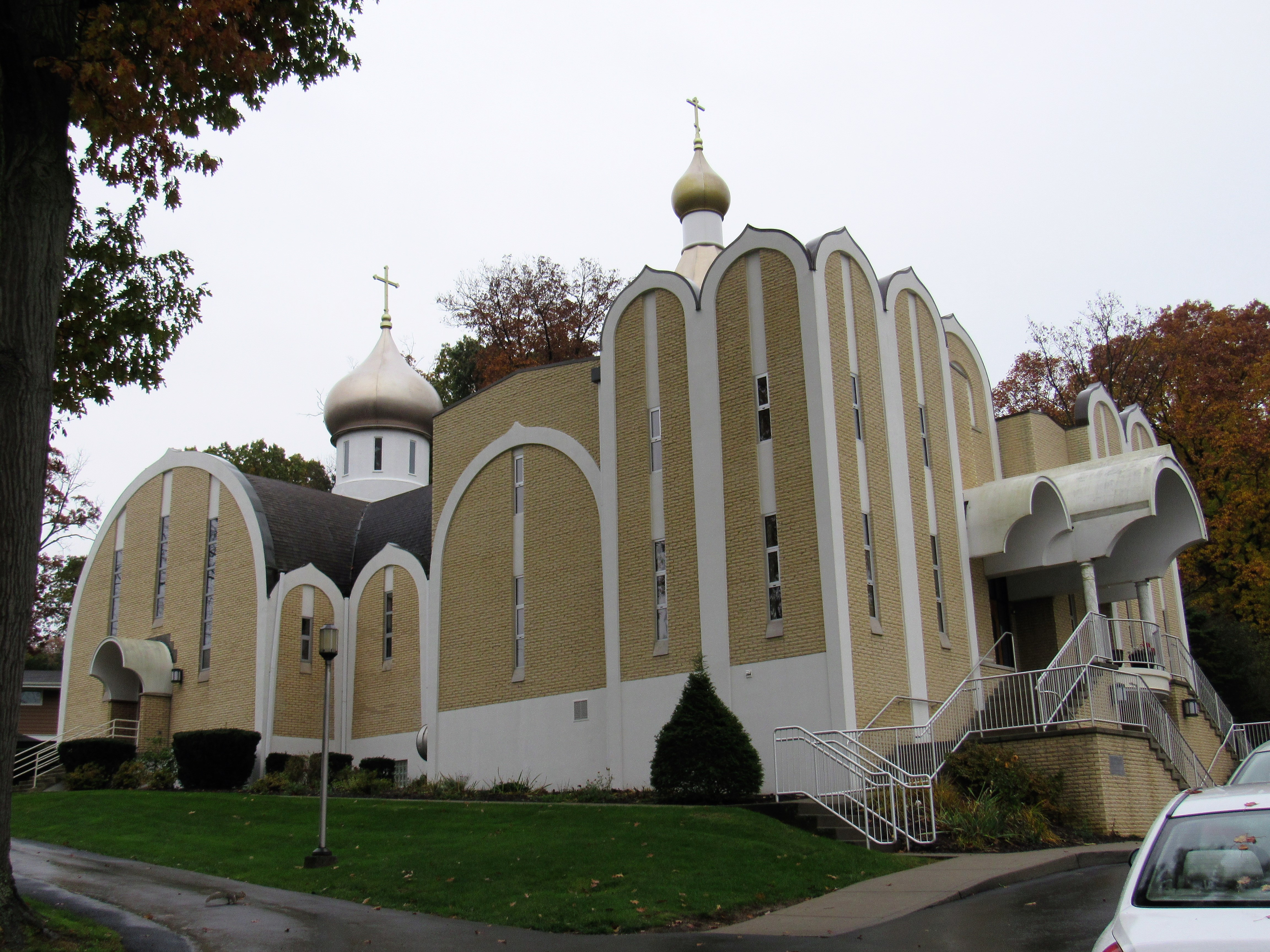
Saint Alexander Nevsky Cathedral in 2017

Saint Alexander Nevsky Cathedral is a parish of the Diocese of Western Pennsylvania of the Orthodox Church in America. It was founded in the Woods Run section of Pittsburgh's North Side in 1891. It was the first Russian Orthodox community in the Pittsburgh area.

The first pastor of Saint Alexander Nevsky parish was Fr. Victor Toth, brother of St. Alexis Toth, who was canonized by the Orthodox Church in America in 1994.

When the Urban Redevelopment Authority of Pittsburgh took over the Woods Run area in the late 1960s, the parish relocated to Allison Park, in Pittsburgh's North Hills. The new Church edifice was designed by architect Sergey Padyukov and was consecrated in 1972 by Bishop Theodosius. The iconostasis, designed by parishioner Vladimir Drobashevsky, and adorned with major icons and feast day icons, was constructed in 1978. The second phase of beautification took place in 1984, and the final phase took place in 1996. Fr. Alexander Jasiukowicz of Chicago and Florida was the icon painter for the church. The Saint Alexander Nevsky icon located on the confessional table contains relics of Saint Alexander inside.

In 1981 Bishop Kyrill designated the Saint Alexander Nevsky parish to become the Archdiocesan Cathedral. The 100th anniversary of the community was celebrated in 1991.

At the turn of the millennium, the Cathedral underwent a major expansion to provide greater school facilities, handicapped access, increased kitchen space, offices, and a theological library. A new set of Russian bells was donated in 1999.

As of 2013 Bishop Melchisedek was in office. The community was led by Archpriest Michael Senyo, who arrived in September 2010 upon the retirement of long-time rector Archpriest Paul Suda. The Cathedral choir was led by Larice Nescott. The parish school was supervised by Matushka Susanne Senyo. Adult education was supervised by Father Michael, assisted by Paul Graycar. A large complement of Altar Servers and Readers assisted at divine services. There was a Women's Association.
