= St. Elia the Prophet Orthodox Church (Akron, Ohio) =

- Location in Ohio
- 41°02′23″N 81°31′45″W
- Location: 64 W Wilbeth Rd; Akron, Ohio
- Country: United States
- Denomination: Orthodox Church of America
- Website: saintelia.com

History
- Founded: 1946
- Dedication: Prophet Elijah

Architecture
- Completed: 1939

Administration
- Diocese: Bulgarian Diocese of Toledo

Clergy
- Bishop: Most Rev. Alexander (Golitzin)
- Rector: Fr. Don Anthony Freude

St. Elia the Prophet Orthodox Church (formerly known as St. Elia Macedono-Bulgarian Orthodox Church) is an English-speaking Eastern Orthodox parish in Akron, Ohio, USA, belonging to the Bulgarian Diocese of the Orthodox Church in America.

== History ==
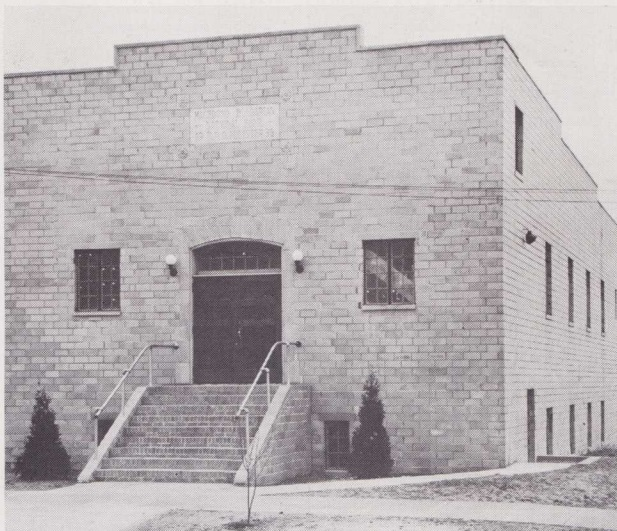
The "Macedonian Home" in 1939, converted to St. Elia Macedono-Bulgarian Orthodox Church in 1946.

The present church structure that is home to St. Elia today was built in 1939 by Akron's Macedonian-Bulgarian community, most of whom had emigrated in the early 20th century from the cities of Bitola, Florina, and Sorovich in southwestern Macedonia. The building was known as the Macedonian Home and it was owned and operated by the local chapter of the Macedonian Patriotic Organization, called "MPO Pelister". Although the building's original use was intended for a community and cultural center, its main floor was periodically used for church needs and a parish board was founded, with priest Rev. George Nicoloff coming in from Detroit on a monthly basis to conduct religious services. Prior to the opening of the Macedonian Home, most members of the community attended "St. Mary's", an Orthodox parish in Akron that belonged to the American diocese of the Russian Orthodox Church.

In February 1946, the parish board announced plans to raise funds for a new church building that was to be constructed adjacent to the Macedonian Home. Spearheaded by community leaders Traitche Paleff, John Mitseff, Nick Dosheff, Anastas Dimitroff, and others, funds were raised through social gatherings, picnics, dances, theatres, and banquets. Ultimately, the parish board decided to permanently convert the first floor of the Macedonian Home to a church, and on October 10, 1946, the church was officially incorporated in the State of Ohio as "St. Ilia Macedono-Bulgarian Eastern Orthodox Church". The parish was originally under the auspices of Bishop Andrey Velichki of the Bulgarian Orthodox Church, but at the insistence of the Macedonian Patriotic Organization (MPO), it subsequently chose to join Bishop Kyrill and the Orthodox Church in America. Those members who did not agree with the decision renounced the MPO, and left St. Elia to create St. Thomas Eastern Orthodox Church in Fairlawn, Ohio.

In the 1980s, after the arrival of Father Don Anthony Freude, St. Elia transitioned to an English speaking parish, with members coming from many ethnic backgrounds. The exterior of the Church building was renovated to its present brick form with arched windows, and a bell tower with dome was added. In 1993, the interior was renovated and in 1996, a new iconostasis was installed with new icons.
