= Bulgarian Eastern Orthodox Diocese of the USA, Canada and Australia =

Diocese of the Bulgarian Orthodox Church

Bulgarian Eastern Orthodox Diocese of the USA, Canada and Australia Българска Източноправославна Епархия В САЩ, Канада и Австралия
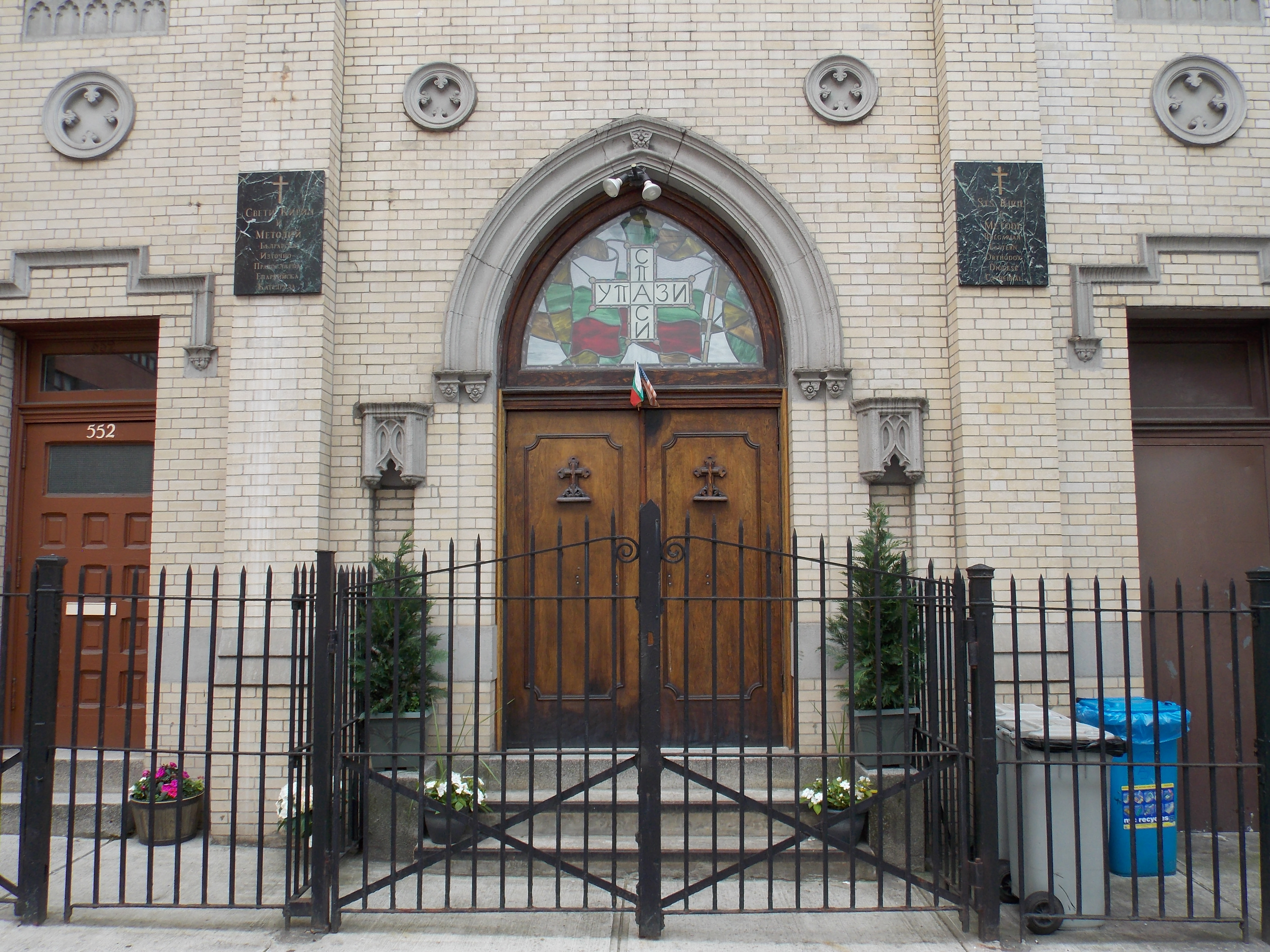
- Saints Cyril and Methodius Cathedral in New York City
- Patriarch of All Bulgaria: Daniil
- Metropolitan: Joseph (Bosakov)
- Language: Bulgarian English
- Territory: United States; Canada; Australia
- Official website: https://www.bulgariandiocese.org

The Bulgarian Eastern Orthodox Diocese of the USA, Canada, and Australia (Bulgarian: Българска източноправославна епархия в САЩ, Канада и Австралия) is one of fifteen dioceses of the Bulgarian Orthodox Church. The diocese is led by Metropolitan Joseph Bosakov of America and Australia. As of 2020 it had 2 monasteries and 24 parishes with 5386 adherents, but 1410 regular attendees in the United States.

== History ==
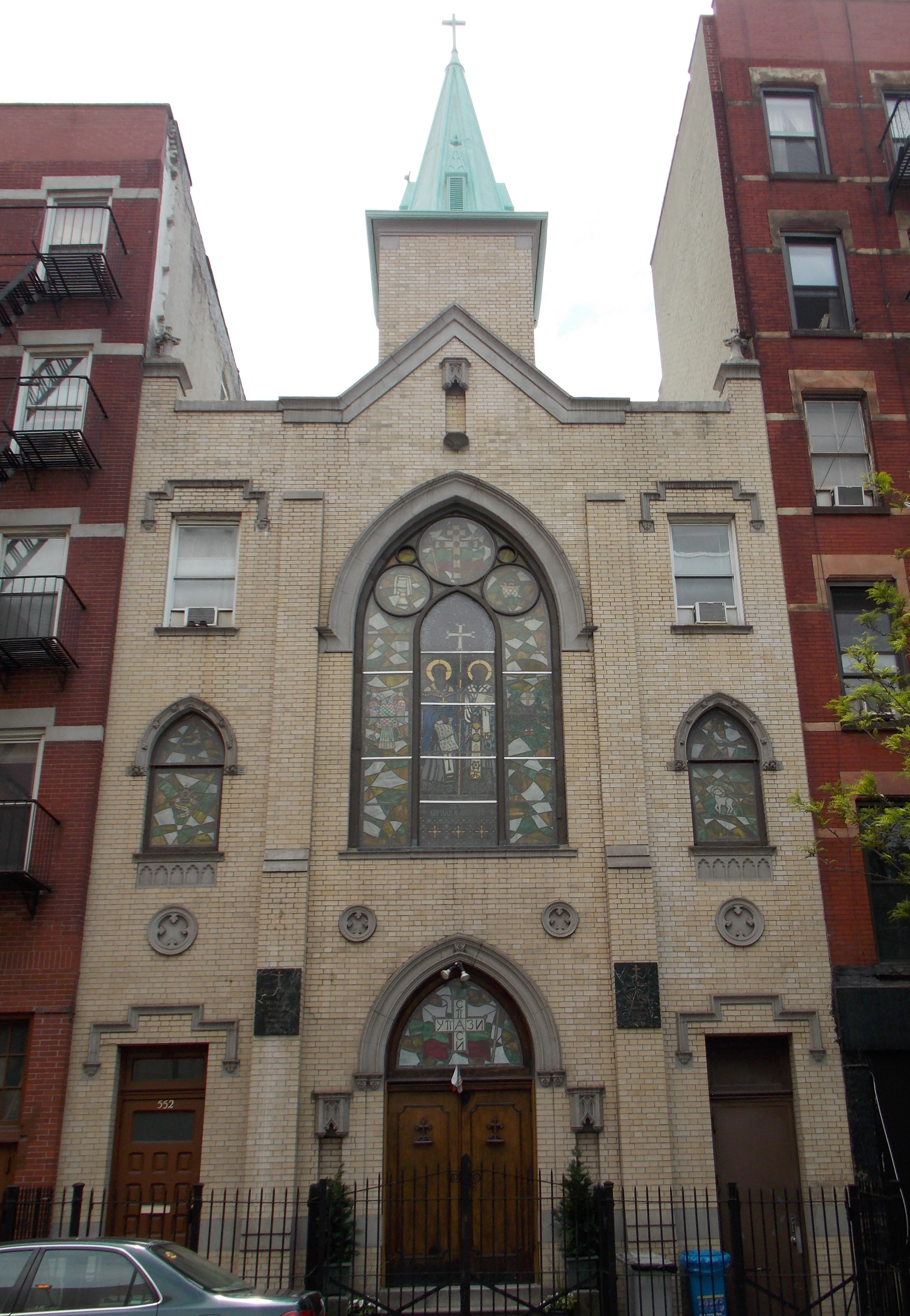
Saints Kyril & Metodi Bulgarian Eastern Orthodox Cathedral in New York

The Bulgarian Eastern Orthodox Diocese of the USA, Canada, and Australia had its origins before World War II as the Bulgarian Diocese of North and South America and Australia. However, a result of the establishment of a Communist government in Bulgaria after the war, relations of the diocese with the Church of Bulgaria were disrupted. Under Metropolitan Andrew (Petkov), the diocese attempted, in the late 1950s, to join the Metropolia but was unsuccessful.

In 1964, Metropolitan Andrew petitioned the Holy Synod of the Church of Bulgaria for his return to the Bulgarian episcopacy and to continue to lead the diocese in America. With the return of Metropolitan Andrew and his diocese to the Church of Bulgaria, a group under Archimandrite Kyrill (Yonchev) broke with Andrew and joined the Russian Orthodox Church Outside of Russia (ROCOR) as the Bulgarian Diocese in Exile. The ROCOR bishops consecrated him bishop.

The Metropolitan Andrew's diocese is currently led by Metropolitan Joseph (Bosakov) with parishes in the United States, Canada, and Australia as an overseas diocese of the Church of Bulgaria under Patriarch Daniil and the Holy Synod of Bishops. The diocesan cathedral is Saints Cyril and Methodius Orthodox Cathedral in New York, USA.

The Bulgarian Eastern Orthodox Diocese of the USA, Canada, and Australia was a member of the Standing Conference of the Canonical Orthodox Bishops in the Americas until its replacement by the Assembly of Canonical Orthodox Bishops of the United States of America, where it is now a member.

== List of Parishes ==
A map of parishes from the 2010 census has been made.

The plaque placed at the original site of the Indianapolis Bulgarian Orthodox Church

Parish	Country	City, State / Province	Clergy
Saints Kyril & Metodi Bulgarian Eastern Orthodox Diocesan Cathedral	United States	New York City, New York	Metropolitan Joseph; Bishop Daniil; Fr. Ikonom Peter Totev;
Holy Dormition Bulgarian Eastern Orthodox Church	United States	Santa Rosa, California	Fr. Michael Oyer, Rector; Fr. David Skopp, Assistant to the Rector; Fr. Stephen Steineck; Protodeacon James Hughes; Deacon Samuel Woolums, Fr. Philip Tolbert, Deacon Matthew Sundahl, Fr. Timothy Zieminski
Christ the Savior Bulgarian Eastern Orthodox Mission	United States	Nashville, Indiana	Fr. Jerome Sanderson, Priest in Charge; Deacon Lucien Stant
Holy Ghost Bulgarian Eastern Orthodox Church	United States	Sterling Heights, Michigan	Archimandrite Gregory (Valentine); Deacon Michael Urbanski
Holy Resurrection Bulgarian Eastern Orthodox	United States	Allston, Massachusetts	Fr. Patrick Tishel, Rector; Fr. Michael Kon; Deacon John Fanourios Williamson; Deacon Teodor Anastasoaie; Deacon Tudor Sambeteanu
Holy Transfiguration Bulgarian Eastern Orthodox	United States	East Syracuse, New York	Fr. Philip McCaffery, Rector; Fr. Peter Bunitsky
Joy of All Who Sorrow Bulgarian Eastern Orthodox Church	United States	Indianapolis, Indiana	Fr. Stevan Bauman, Rector; The Reverend John Koen Protodeacon Michael Walker
Holy Trinity Bulgarian Eastern Orthodox Church	United States	Madison, Illinois	Fr. Ivan Malinov
Saint Herman of Alaska Bulgarian Eastern Orthodox Church	United States	Hudson, Ohio	The Reverend Basil Rusen, Rector; Deacon Basil Wallace
Saint Innocent of Alaska Bulgarian Eastern Orthodox Church	United States	Kodiak, Alaska	Fr. Paisius DeLucia, Rector; Fr. Joshua Resnick; Deacon Anthony May
Saint Innocent of Alaska Bulgarian Eastern Orthodox Mission	United States	Salem, Virginia	Fr. Michael Furry, Rector.
Saint Petka Bulgarian Eastern Orthodox Church	United States	Brookline, Massachusetts	Fr. Rumen Pelovsky, Priest in Charge.
Saint Sophia Bulgarian Eastern Orthodox Church	United States	Phoenix, Arizona	Fr. Michael Michaelov, Rector
Saint Sophia Bulgarian Eastern Orthodox Church	United States	Des Plaines, Illinois	Fr. Gruiou Tzonkov, Rector
Saint Stephen Bulgarian Eastern Orthodox Church	United States	Indianapolis, Indiana	Fr. Dimitar Angelov, Rector
Saint Thomas Eastern Orthodox Church	United States	Fairlawn, Ohio	Fr. James/Dimitri/Wright, Rector; Fr. Vladimir Bakurdzhiev,
St. Clement Ohridski Macedono-Bulgarian Eastern Orthodox Church	United States	Dearborn, Michigan	Fr. Slavcho Panev
St. Maximos the Confessor Skete	United States	Palmyra, Virginia	Rev. Igumen Father Mefodii; Rev. Hieromonk Father Kyrill; Brother Paul
St. George Bulgarian Eastern Orthodox Church	United States	Orlando, Florida	Fr. Ljubisa Brnjos
Saints Kyril & Metodi Bulgarian Eastern Orthodox Cathedral	Canada	Toronto, Ontario	Fr. Valery Shoumarov
St. Dimitar Bulgarian Eastern Orthodox Church	Canada	Toronto, Ontario	Very Rev. Dr. Milan Radulović
St. George Macedono-Bulgarian Eastern Orthodox Church	Canada	Toronto, Ontario	Fr. Georgi Despodov, Rector; Fr. Boris Drangov,
Holy Trinity Macedono-Bulgarian Eastern Orthodox Church	Canada	Toronto, Ontario	Fr. Velichko Mihaylov, Rector
Holy Ascension Orthodox Church	Canada	Toronto, Aurora, Ontario	Fr. Milan Radulovic; Fr. Boris Kriger
Holy Transfiguration Orthodox Mission	Canada	Huntsville, Ontario	Fr. Boris Kriger
Saint Ivan Rilsky Eglise Orthodoxe Bulgare	Canada	Montreal, Quebec	Fr. Dimiter Shumov
Saints Kyril & Metodi Bulgarian Eastern Orthodox Cathedral	Australia	Melbourne, Victoria	Fr. Alexander Popov
Saint Petka Bulgarian Eastern Orthodox Church	Australia	Adelaide, South Australia	Fr. Todor Popov

Source: Official site of the Diocese

== See also ==
- Bulgarian Diocese of the Orthodox Church in America
- Assembly of Canonical Orthodox Bishops of the United States of America
- Assembly of Canonical Orthodox Bishops of Canada
- Assembly of Canonical Orthodox Bishops of Australia, New Zealand, and Oceania

== Sources ==
- OrthodoxWiki Source for Article
