= Holy Cross Orthodox Monastery (Castro Valley, California) =

Eastern Orthodox monastery in Castro Valley, California

Coordinates: 37.6332°N 121.9517°W

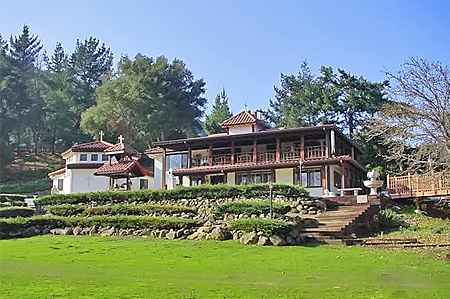
Holy Cross Monastery from the East.

Holy Cross Orthodox Monastery (also known as Holy Cross Monastery) is a monastic institution of the Orthodox Church in America (OCA), located in Castro Valley, California.

The clergy of the monastery previously served under the omophorion of Archbishop Kyrill, who led the OCA's Orthodox Church in America Archdiocese of Pittsburgh and Western Pennsylvania and the Diocese of Toledo, Ohio. Since the repose of Archbishop Kyrill during the summer of 2007, they now serve under the omophorion of Metropolitan Tikhon (Mollard).

The monastery is visited by Orthodox Christians of all ethnic backgrounds and all cultural traditions, and Orthodox Christians from many backgrounds come to the monastery for Divine Service, weddings, baptisms, and other sacramental blessings. Spiritual day retreats have been held there by Orthodox Christian groups.

Services at are usually conducted in the languages best understood by those worshiping with the Fathers, who can conduct services in Romanian, Slavonic (Old Bulgarian), Greek, or English as the need arises.

Great Vespers is held on Saturday evenings, and on Sunday mornings First Hour, Third Hour and Divine Liturgy are celebrated. Services are open to the general public. Other liturgical offices are reserved for the monks and may be attended by special arrangement.

== History ==
The monastery began with its abbot, Archimandrite Theodor. In 1965, after he had been ordained as a priest for just one year, his mother suddenly and unexpectedly died. He was an only son and his mother left her inheritance to him; since she knew of his intention to build a monastery one day. Father Theodor worked as a parish priest until he met his first disciple in 1970. They made a vow that one day they would build a monastery together dedicated to the Appearance of the Holy Cross over Jerusalem.

Nine years later the monks had saved enough money to buy property suitable for a monastery, and then, in 1979, with the blessing of their diocesan bishop they purchased a rural estate that would eventually be consecrated as Holy Cross Monastery. The monks performed most of the labor themselves.
