= Bulgarian Diocese of the Orthodox Church in America =

Ethnic diocese of the Orthodox Church in America

Bulgarian Diocese of America

orthodox

Location
- Country: United States
- Metropolitan: Tikhon (Mollard)

Information
- Denomination: Eastern Orthodox
- Language: English, Bulgarian

Current leadership
- Parent church: Orthodox Church in America
- Archbishop: Alexander (Golitzin)

Map
- The states in which the Bulgarian Diocese has jurisdiction.

Website
- www.bdoca.org

The Bulgarian Diocese of the Orthodox Church in America (also known as the Bulgarian Diocese of Toledo, and originally known as the Bulgarian Diocese in Exile) is one of three ethnic dioceses of the Orthodox Church in America (OCA). It was created in 1963 by Eastern Orthodox Christians of Bulgarian and Macedonian descent. Its territory includes parishes, monasteries, and missions located in seven states in the United States: California, Illinois, Indiana, Virginia, Michigan, Ohio, Iowa, and Washington, D.C. The first bishop of the diocese was the Most Reverend Kyrill (Yonchev), who also served as the Archbishop of Pittsburgh and Western Pennsylvania. After his death on June 17, 2007, Metropolitan Herman served as locum tenens of the diocese until the election of Archimandrite Alexander (Golitzin) on October 4, 2011. On May 5, 2012, he was consecrated as bishop of the diocese during a Hierarchical Divine Liturgy at Saint George Orthodox Cathedral in Rossford, Ohio.

== History ==
As a result of the establishment of a Communist government in Bulgaria after the World War II, relations of the Bulgarian Eastern Orthodox Diocese of the USA, Canada and Australia with the Bulgarian Orthodox Church were disrupted. In the late 1950s, its head Metropolitan Andrew (Petkov) petitioned to be accepted into the Russian Metropolia (now known as the Orthodox Church in America), but had been declined by them for unclear reasons. Then, Andrew decided to regularize his relations with and return to the Bulgarian Orthodox Church, with whom he had broken communications. In 1963, he petitioned and was approved by the Holy Synod in Sofia to be readmitted to the Bulgarian Orthodox Church and continue to lead Bulgarian Orthodoxy in North America.

One of his prominent clergy, Archimandrite Kyrill (Yonchev), disagreed with his decision to return the diocese to an Orthodox Church based in a communist country, and therefore left it to join the Russian Orthodox Church Outside of Russia, where he was ordained bishop of the new Bulgarian Diocese in Exile. Sharing his fear that the Bulgarian Orthodox Church was strongly influenced by the communist regime in Sofia, many Macedono-Bulgarian Orthodox communities in the United States and Canada (organized under the auspices of the Macedonian Patriotic Organization), voiced their support for Bishop Kyrill and transferred their parishes, or created new ones, under his authority. Bishop Kyrill also persuaded many to accept his authority due partly to Metropolitan Andrew's advanced age.

In 1976, Bishop Kyrill and his Bulgarian Diocese in Exile left the ROCOR and joined the Orthodox Church in America, thus creating its current Bulgarian Diocese.

== List of Parishes ==
Parish	Country	City, State	Clergy
St. George Macedono-Bulgarian Orthodox Church	United States	Rossford, Ohio (Toledo Metropolitan Area)	Archbishop Alexander (Golitzin), Rector
Holy Ghost Macedono-Bulgarian Orthodox Church	United States	Youngstown, Ohio	V. Rev. Basil Duesenberry
Sts. Cyril & Methodius Macedono-Bulgarian Orthodox Church	United States	Lorain, Ohio	V. Rev. Paul G. Monkowski
Sts. Cyril & Methody Macedono-Bulgarian Orthodox Church	United States	Granite City, Illinois	Fr. Andrew Moulton
St. Elia the Prophet Macedono-Bulgarian Orthodox Church	United States	Akron, Ohio	V. Rev. Don Freude
St. Nicholas Macedono-Bulgarian Orthodox Cathedral	United States	Fort Wayne, Indiana	V. Rev. Andrew Jarmus
Joy of All Who Sorrow Orthodox Church	United States	Indianapolis, Indiana	Fr. John Miller
St. Kliment of Ochrid Bulgarian Orthodox Church	United States	Los Angeles, California	
St. John of Rila Bulgarian Orthodox Church	United States	McLean, Virginia	V. Rev. Chterion Zaprianov
St. Mary Magdalene Orthodox Church	United States	Fenton, Michigan	Fr. Gabriel Bilas
St. Nikolai Orthodox Church	United States	Louisville, Ohio	V. Rev. Stephen Duesenberry
St. Nicholas Orthodox Church	United States	Burton, Michigan	V. Rev. Matthew-Peter Butrie
St. John the Baptist Orthodox Church	United States	Los Angeles, California	
St. George Orthodox Church	United States	Washington, DC	
Holy Cross Orthodox Monastery	United States	Castro Valley, California	Igumen Stephen, Abbot
St. Andrew the Apostle Orthodox Mission	United States	North Hollywood, California	V. Rev. Viorel Vasile Visovan
Holy Transfiguration Orthodox Mission	United States	Ames, Iowa	Fr. Marty Watt

== See also ==
- Bulgarian Eastern Orthodox Diocese of the USA, Canada and Australia
