= Yonchev =

Yonchev (Bulgarian: Йончев) or Yoncheva is a surname. Notable people with the surname include:

- Elena Yoncheva (born 1964), Bulgarian journalist
- Kyrill (Yonchev) (1945–2007), Bulgarian bishop
- Marin Yonchev (born 1988), Bulgarian singer
- Sonya Yoncheva (born 1981), Bulgarian soprano
