= Sergey Padyukov =

American architect

Sergey Nikolaevich Padyukov (Russian: Серге́й Никола́евич Падюко́в; 23 October 1922 – 22 October 1993; last name variantly spelled as Padukow) was an American architect and engineer, sculptor, and human rights activist.

Sergey Padyukov was born in a Russian family in Brest, a Polish city at that time. He graduated from Russian secondary school at Brest and together with parents was forced to move to Warsaw after Soviet invasion of Poland. At the end of World War II Padyukov's family found themselves in Munich in French occupation zone and Sergey started his high education at the Ludwig-Maximilians-Universität München (LMU). During this time he met and married Gerda (born 1925) who studied chemistry at the same university. Later Sergey Padyukov completed his education at Karlsruhe Institute of Technology and graduated as an architect. In 1954 Sergey Padyukov with family emigrated to USA and were living in Lakewood, NJ and later in Toms River, NJ. Sergey Padyukov received a license as an architect at Princeton University in 1960 and from 1965 he was a member of AIA. He introduced a new technology for construction of domes for church buildings from fiberglass and constructed (together with reconstruction of previously demolished buildings) 45 churches at the USA and hundreds of civil buildings. Sergey Padyukov's style involved traditional Eastern Orthodox Church decorations, but also modern elements and use of modern materials. Four churches constructed by Sergey Padyukov were classified as buildings of historic or architectural merit.

The onion dome in Whitestone was added in 1991: Did he design the original 1968 church or the 1991 additions or both?

== List of buildings ==
- St. Mary's Russian Orthodox Church at St. Vladimir's Cemetery, 1968, Jackson Township, New Jersey
- St. Nicholas Orthodox Church, 1969, Whitestone, Queens, New York
- St. Michael's Cathedral, 1976, Sitka, Alaska (Replicating the original historic church, which burned in 1966, using modern materials)
- St. Alexander Nevsky Cathedral, Pittsburgh, Pennsylvania
- St. Thomas the Apostle Byzantine Catholic Church (the altar design), Rahway, New Jersey
- St. Michael's Ukrainian Greek Catholic Church, 1984, Shenandoah, Pennsylvania
- St. Barbara Greek Orthodox Church, 1986, Toms River, New Jersey
- Second Baptist Church, 1980, Toms River, New Jersey
- St. Vladimir Memorial Church, 1988, Jackson Township, New Jersey
- Kimisis Tis Theotokou Greek Orthodox Church and Community Center, 1988, Holmdel Township, New Jersey, NJ
- Blessed Virgin Mary Russian Orthodox Church, McKeesport, Pennsylvania
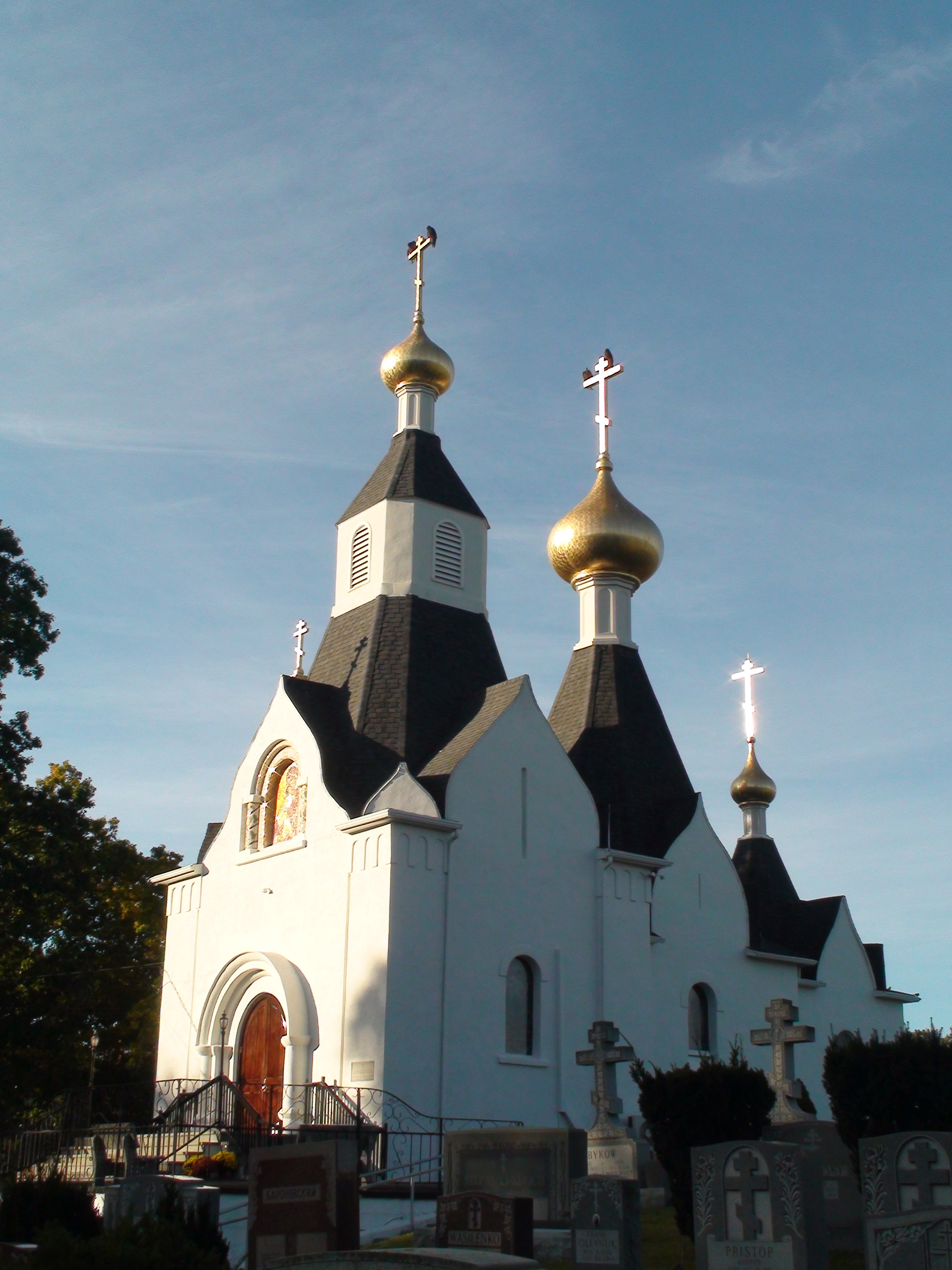
St. Mary's Russian Orthodox Church at St. Vladimir's Cemetery, Jackson Township, New Jersey

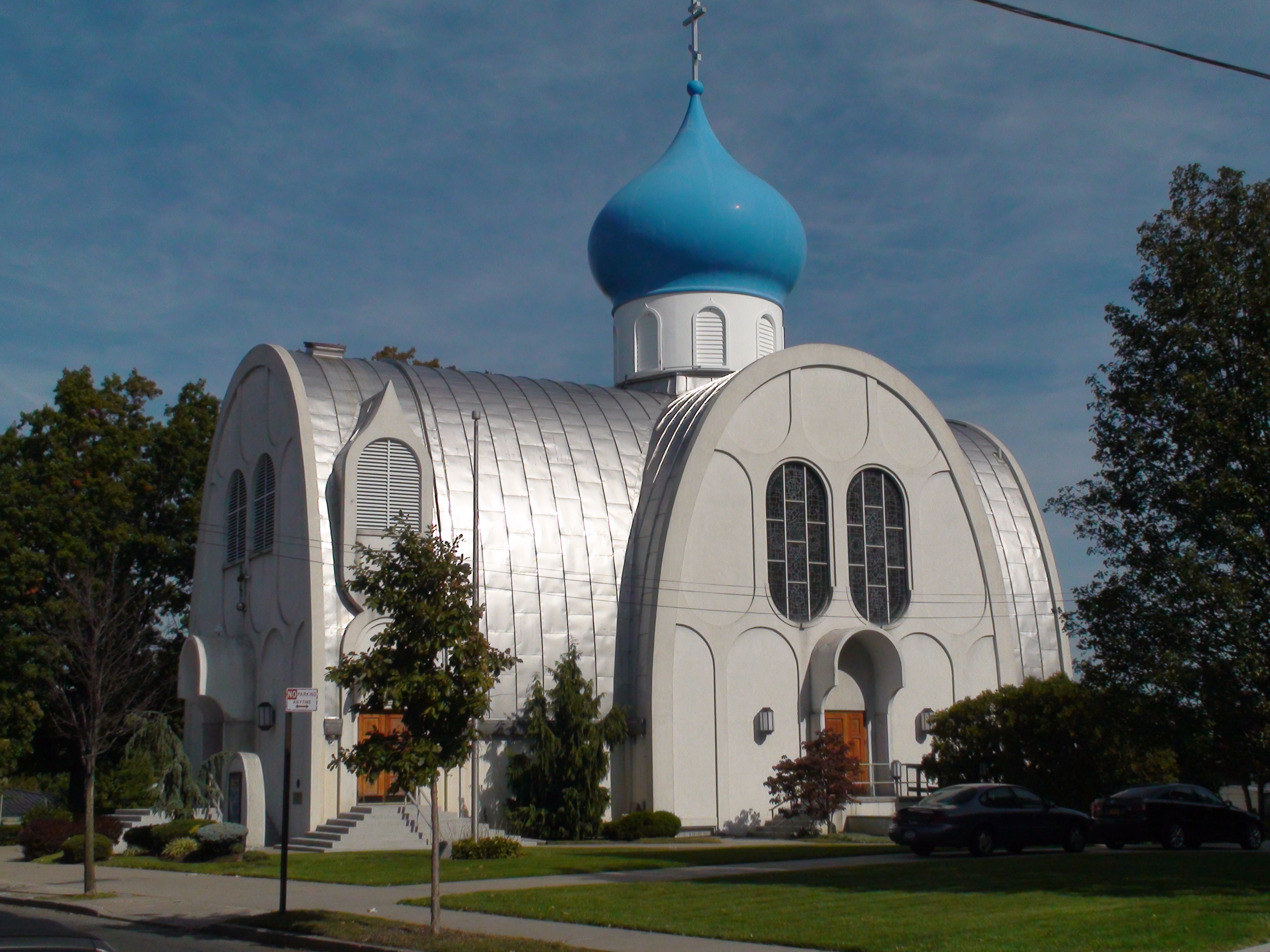
St. Nicholas Orthodox Church, New York

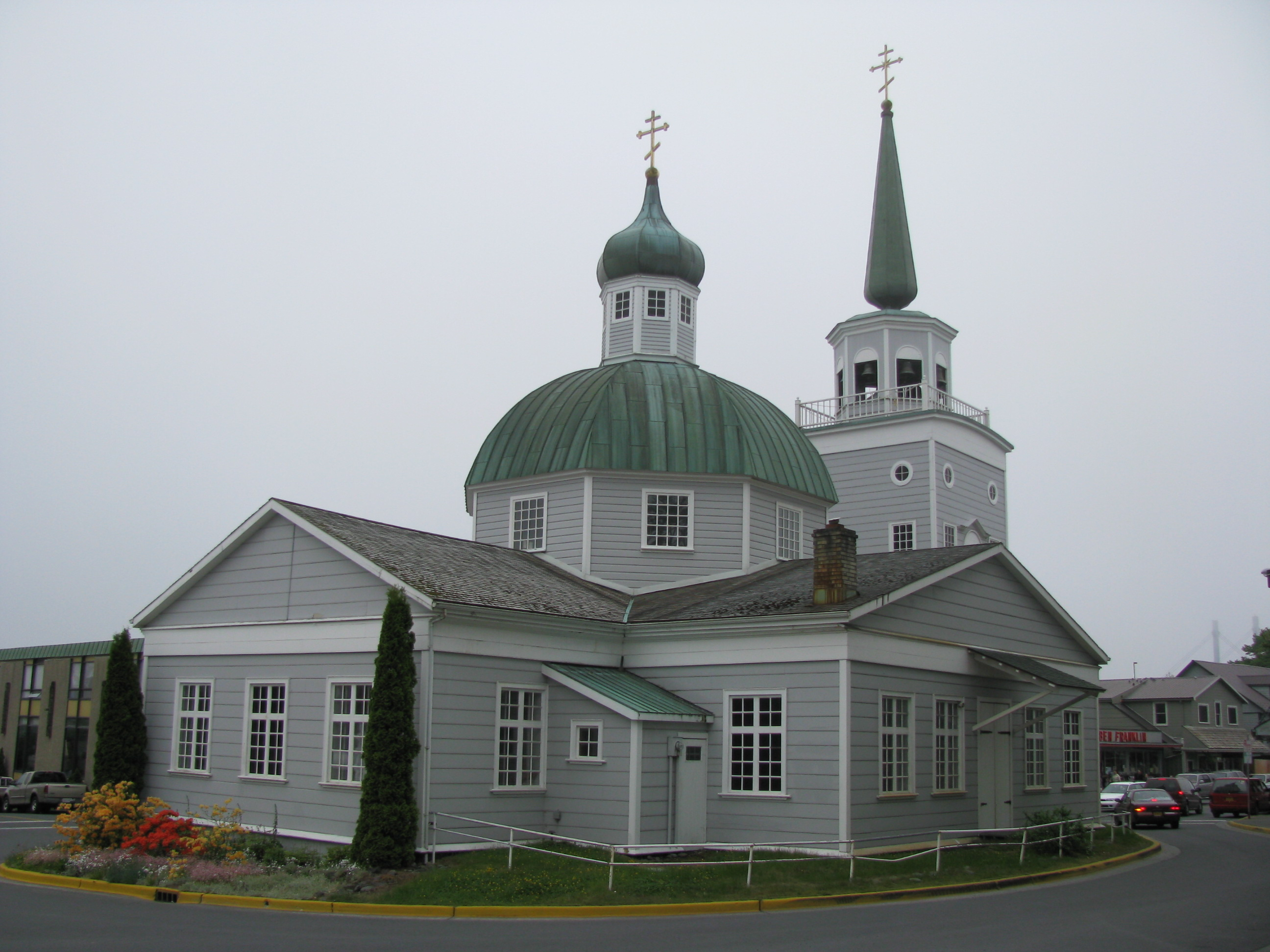
St. Michael's Cathedral Sitka, Alaska

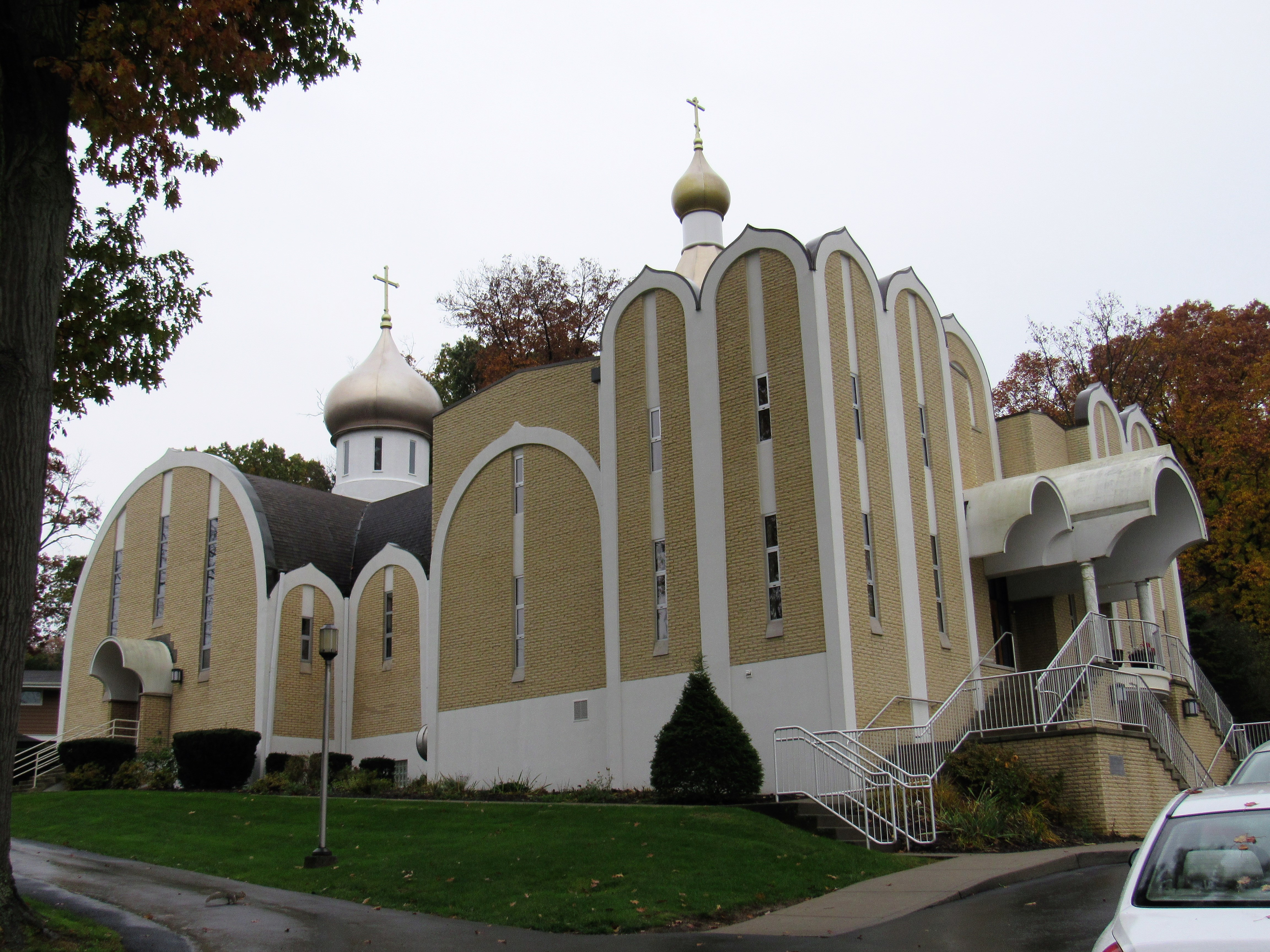
St. Alexander Nevsky Cathedral, Pittsburgh, Pennsylvania

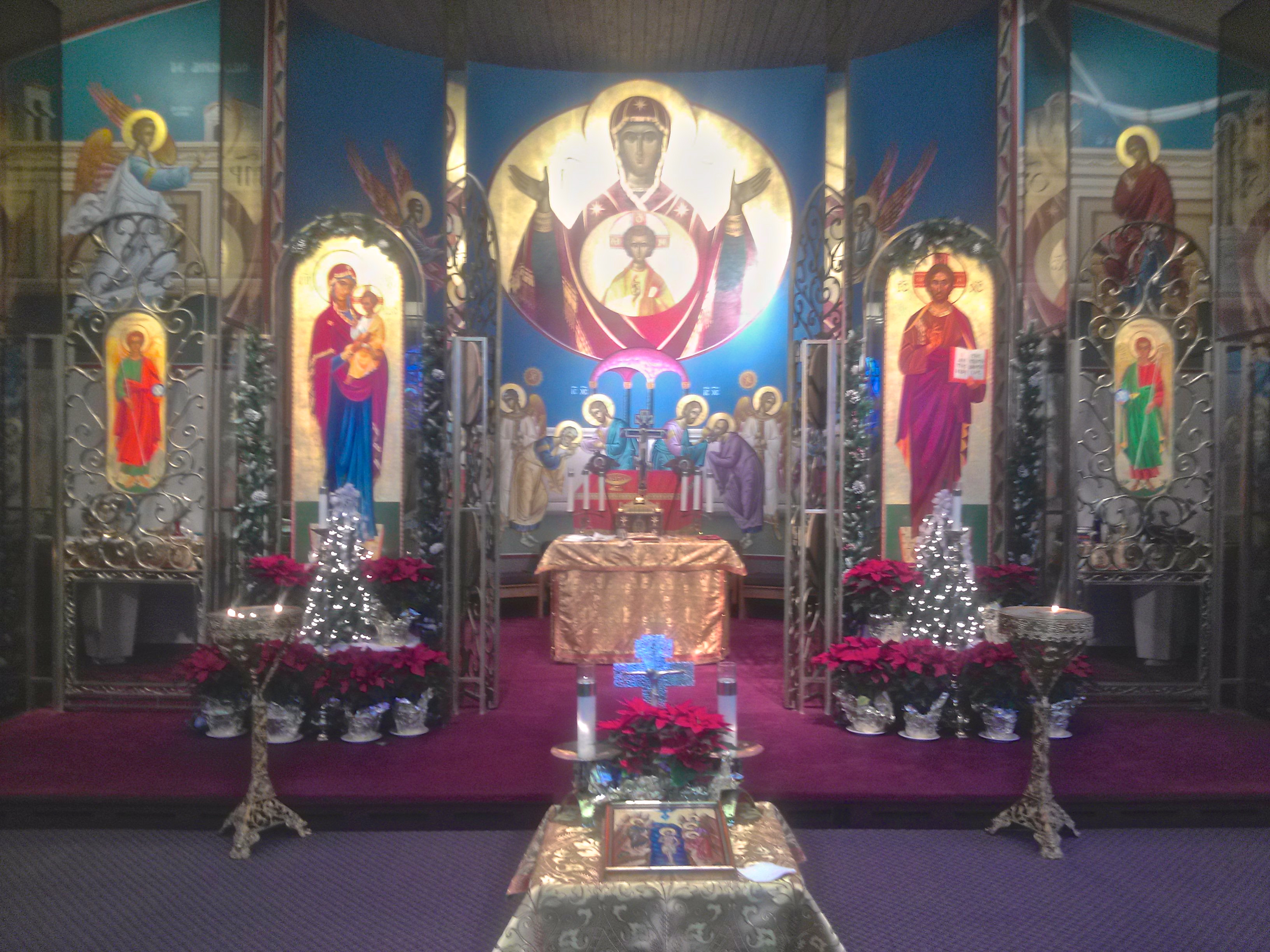
Altar at St. Thomas the Apostle Byzantine Catholic Church, Rahway, New Jersey

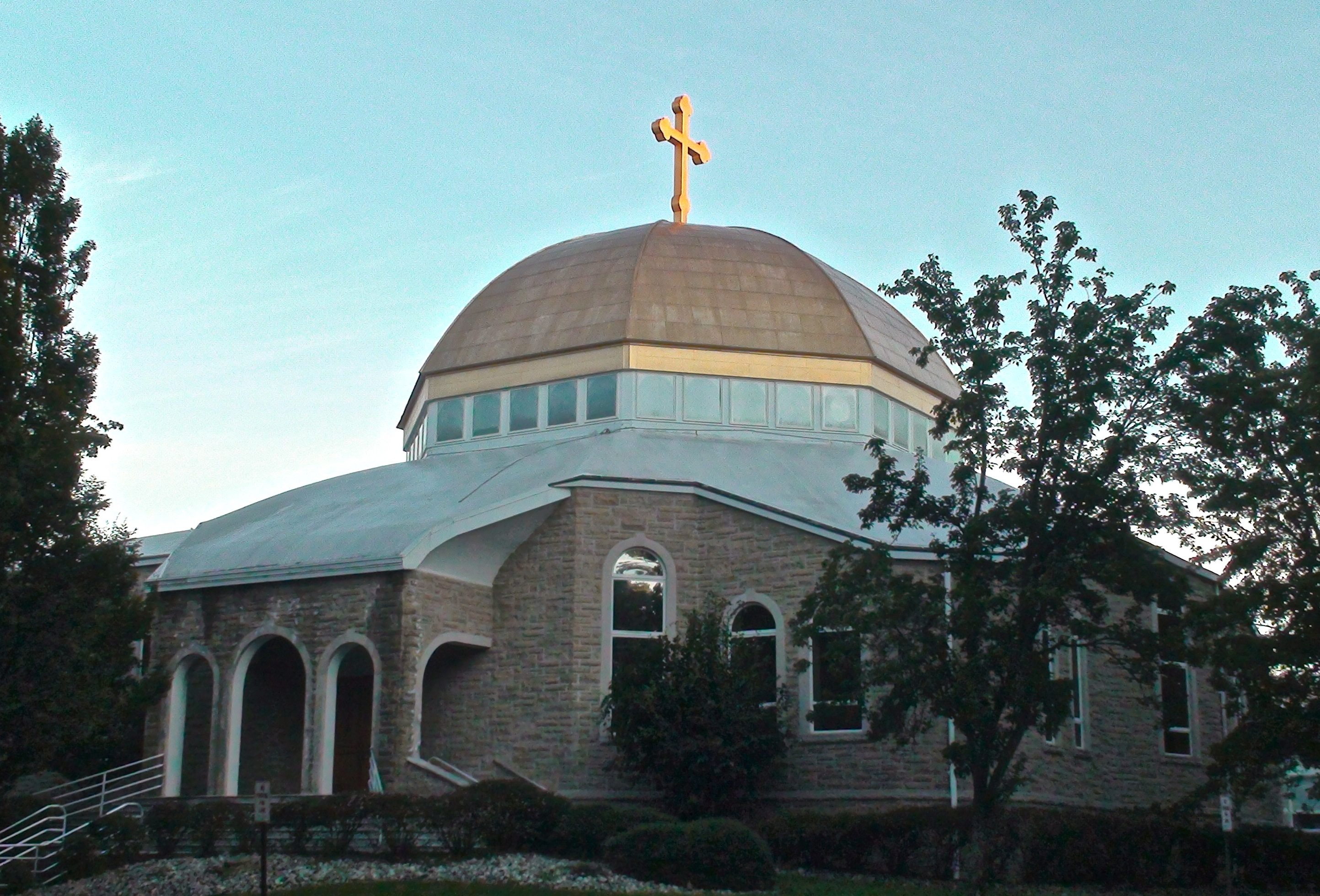
St. Barbara Greek Orthodox Church, Toms River, New Jersey

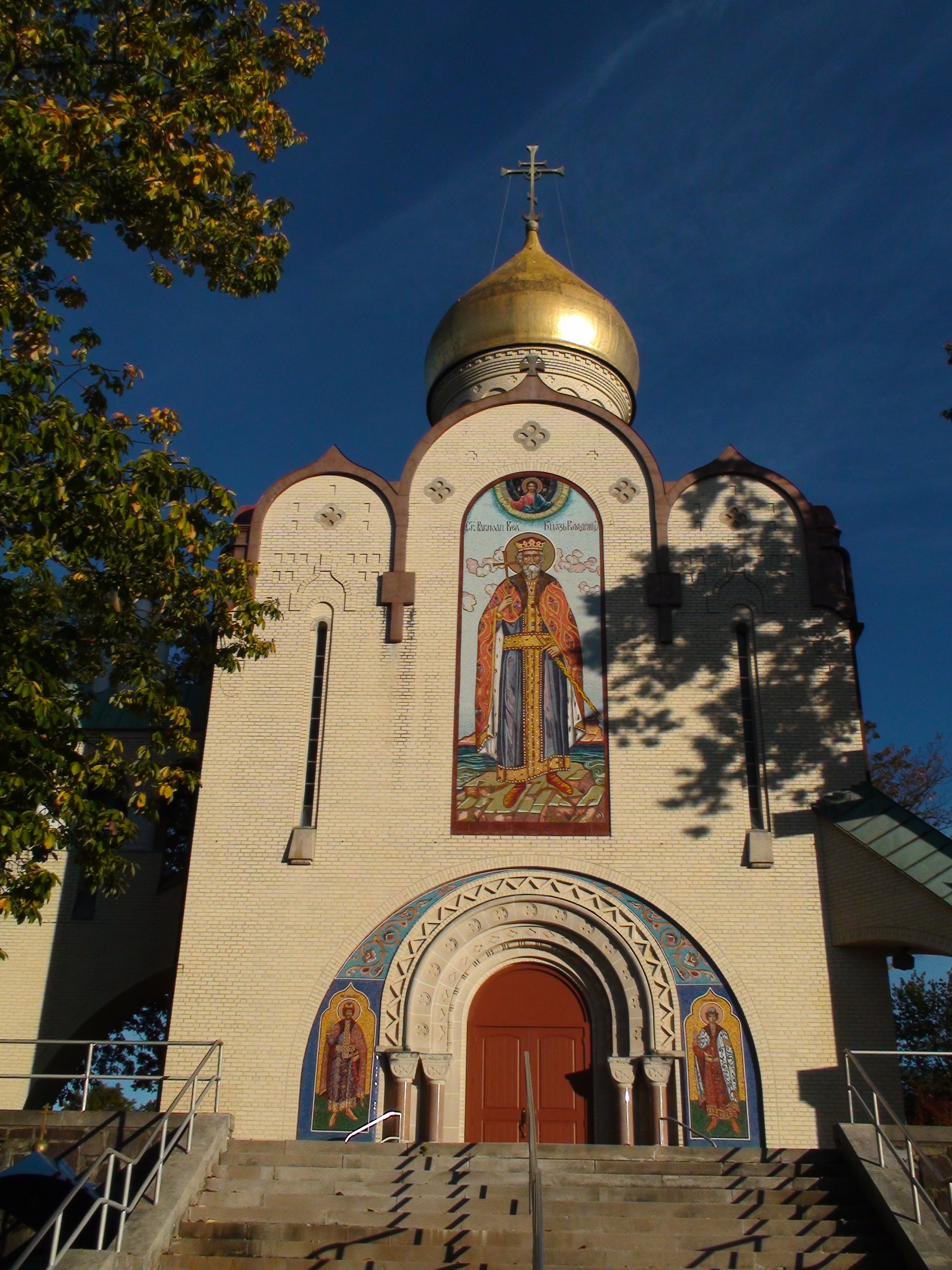
St. Vladimir Memorial Church, Jackson Township, New Jersey

== Political activity ==
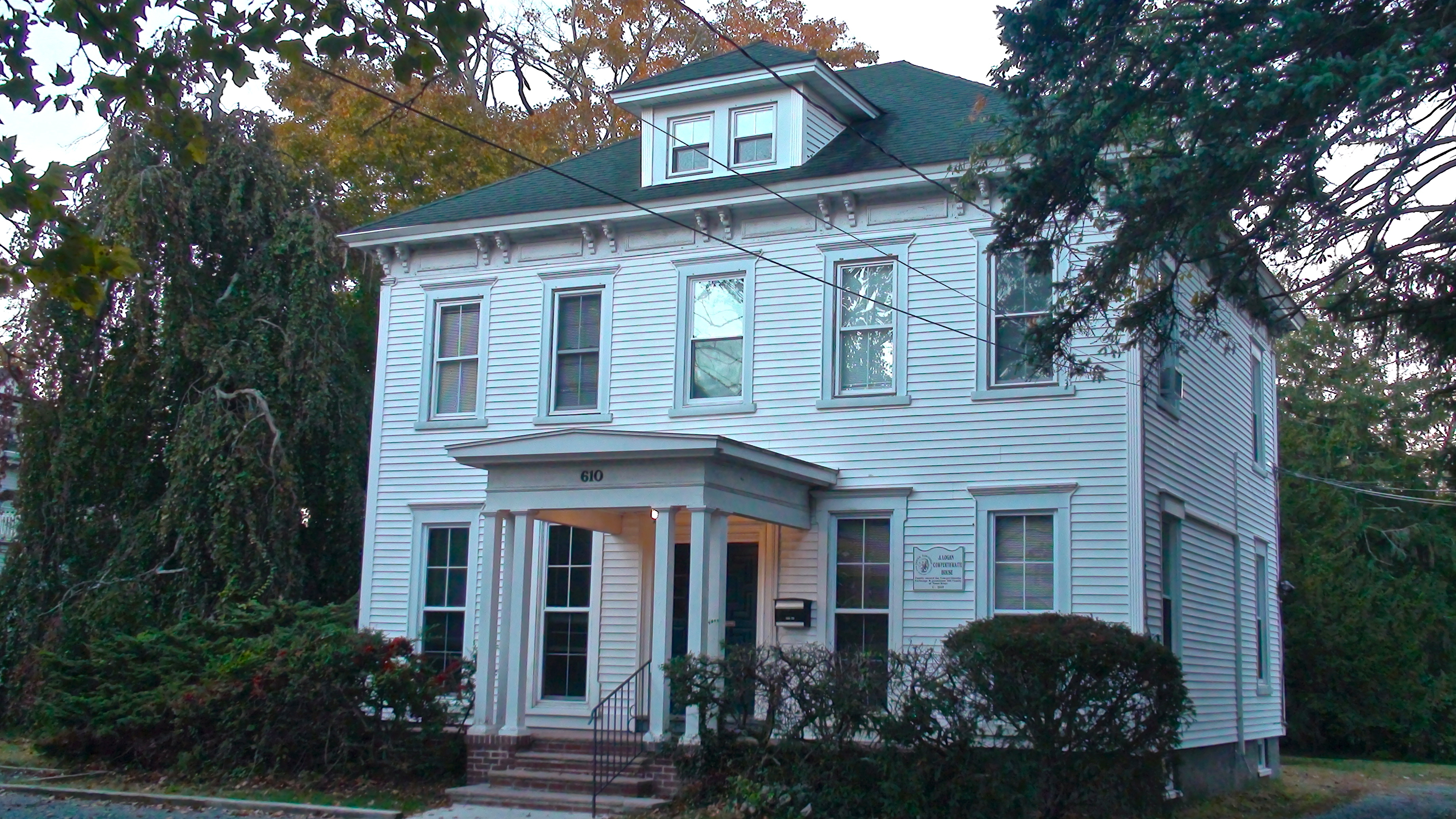
Last address of Sergey Padyukov, 610 Main Street, Toms River, New Jersey.

Sergey Padyukov and his older brother, Arkady, were members of National Alliance of Russian Solidarists, known as NTS. Arkady Padyukov was arrested and executed by NKVD in 1943 in Smolensk Oblast. Later, in USA, as a human rights activist, Sergey Padyukov was serving as an expert for American Security Council Foundation and Republican National Committee. He was a board member of Young Americans for Freedom Organization and a member of the Congress of Russian Americans. During perestroyka Sergey Padyukov established an active collaboration with political activists in Russia and regularly visited Moscow. He died after one of the visits at the end of 1993 in his home in Toms River, New Jersey.

== Bibliography ==
- Andreev S. The Golden Domes of Sergey Padyukov // Rodina (Андреев С. Золотые купола Сергея Падюкова // Родина), 1993, no. 5–6. pp. 116–118.
- Radlo L. Between Two Evils: The World War II Memoir of a Girl in Occupied Warsaw and a Nazi Labor Camp, 2009, Jefferson, NC, McFarland & Company ISBN 978-0-7864-4032-0
- Saint Michael the Archangel Russian Orthodox Church At: SAH Archipedia, eds. Gabrielle Esperdy and Karen Kingsley, Charlottesville: UVaP, 2012.
