= Aleksei Sokolov =

Russian Orthodox priest

Aleksei Sokolov (1787 – after 1833) was a Russian Orthodox priest. He was the first priest to arrive in Sitka, Alaska from Russia in 1816. He brought the festival icon of St. Michael and the silver-plated icon to the St. Michael's Cathedral. The silver-covered icon is to the right of the main ikonostasis and the festival icon of St. Michael is in the Chapel of Our Lady of Kazan on display in a showcase.
