= St. Michael's Cathedral (Sitka, Alaska) =

Historic church in Alaska, United States

- U.S. National Register of Historic Places
- U.S. National Historic Landmark
- Alaska Heritage Resources Survey
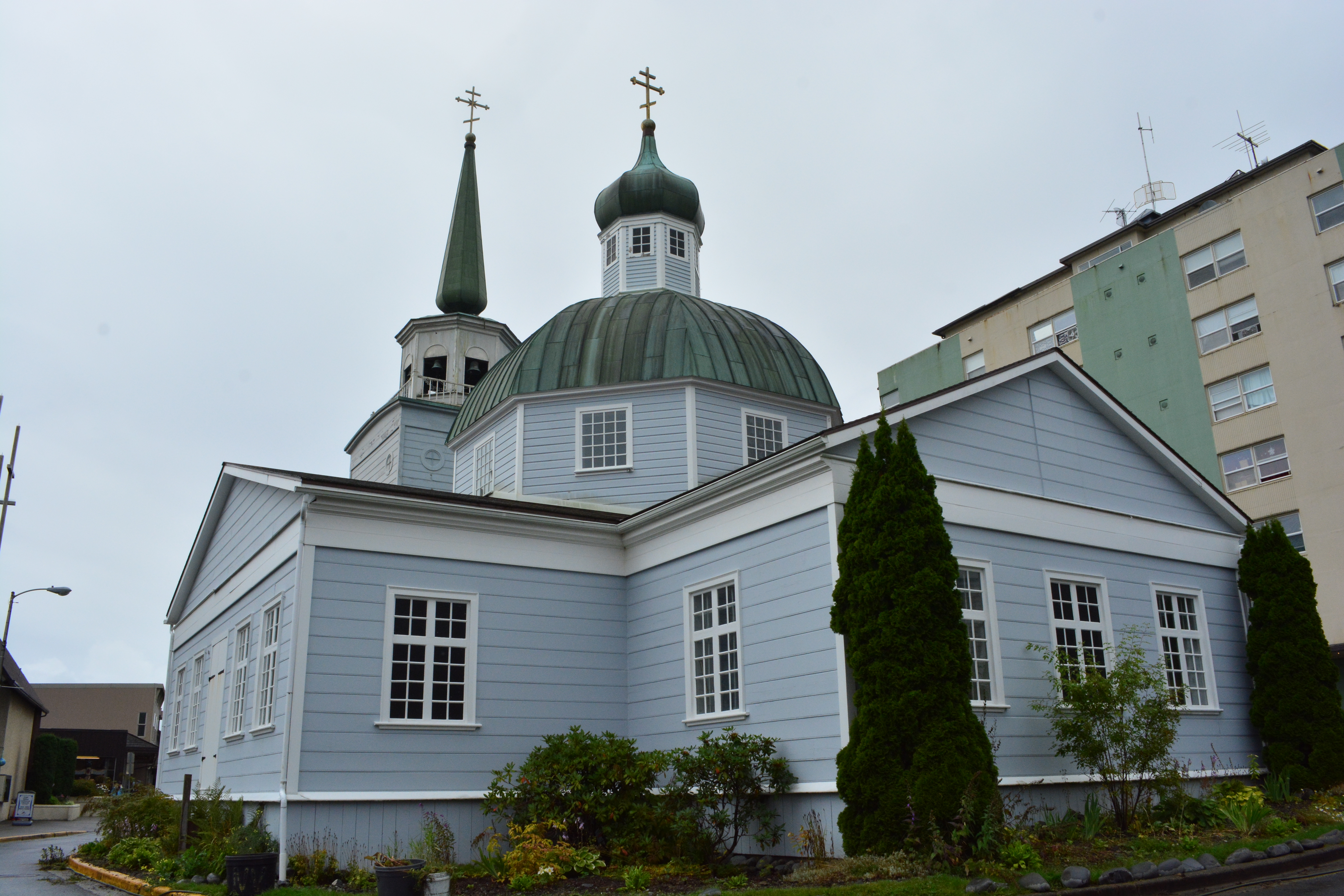
- 2023

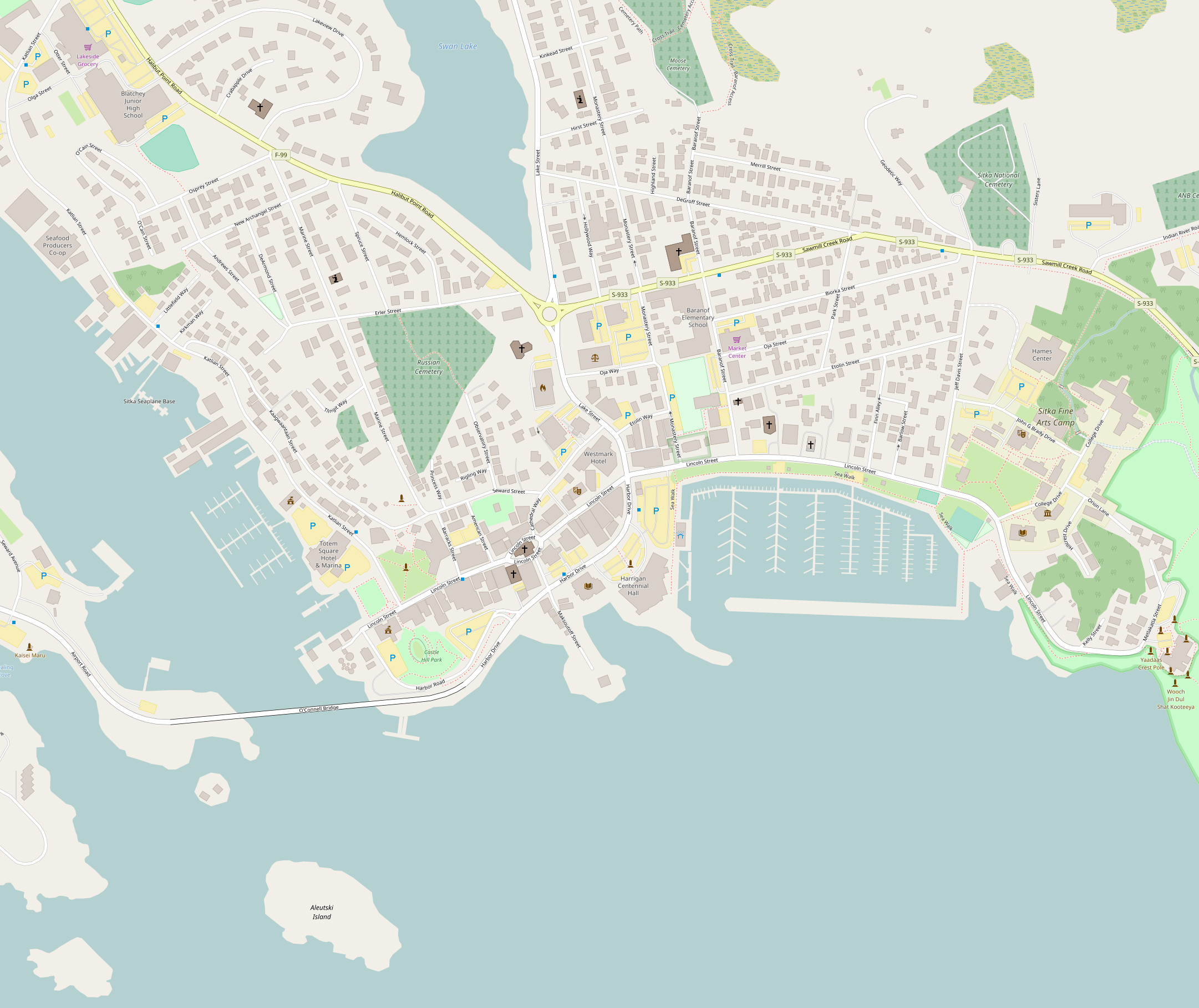
- Location within Downtown Sitka Location within Alaska
- Location: 240 Lincoln Street, Sitka, Alaska
- Coordinates: 57°03′00″N 135°20′06″W
- Area: 0.16 acres (0.065 ha)
- Built: 1848
- Architect: Bishop Innocent (Veniaminov); Sergey Padyukov
- Architectural style: Russian
- MPS: Russian Orthodox Church Buildings and Sites TR (AD)
- NRHP reference No.: 66000165
- AHRS No.: SIT-010

Significant dates
- Added to NRHP: October 15, 1966
- Designated NHL: June 13, 1962
- Designated AHRS: June 13, 1962

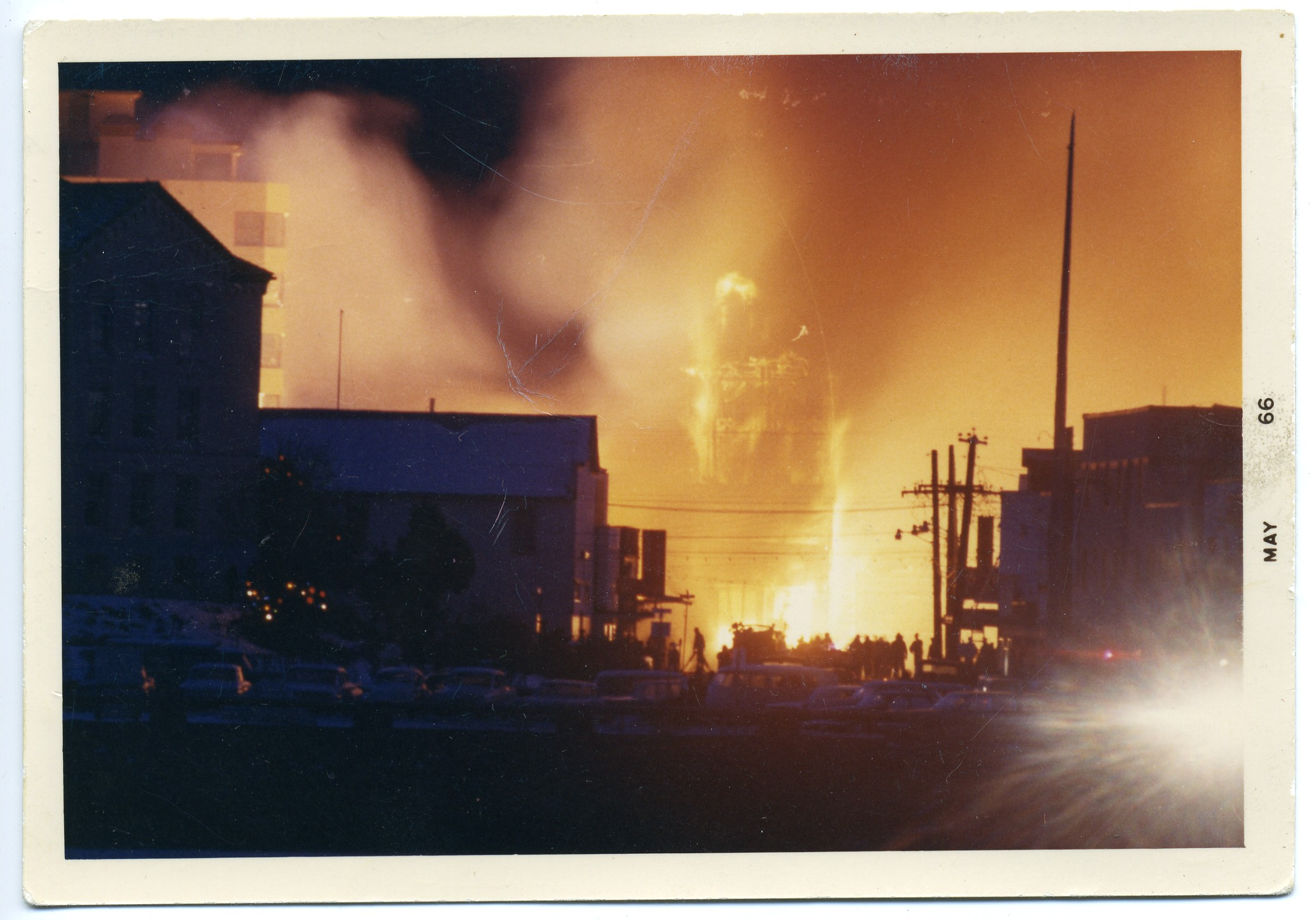
Fire at St. Michael's Cathedral, 1966.

St. Michael's Cathedral (Russian: Собор Архангела Михаила, romanized: Sobor Arkhangela Mikhaila; also known as the Cathedral of St. Michael the Archangel) is a cathedral of the Orthodox Church in America Diocese of Alaska, at Lincoln and Maksoutoff Streets in Sitka, Alaska. The earliest Orthodox cathedral in the New World, it was built in the nineteenth century, when Alaska was under the control of Russia, though this structure burned down in 1966. After 1872, the cathedral came under the control of the Diocese of Alaska. It had been a National Historic Landmark since 1962, notable as an important legacy of Russian influence in North America and Southeast Alaska in particular.

An accidental fire destroyed the cathedral during the night of January 2, 1966, but it was subsequently rebuilt. The new building's green domes and golden crosses are a prominent landmark in Sitka. Some of the icons date to the mid-17th century; two icons are by Vladimir Borovikovsky.

St. Michael's Cathedral is located in the downtown business district in Sitka, on the southwestern coast of Baranof Island in the Alexander Archipelago of Southeastern Alaska. Its surroundings along Lincoln Street and Maksoutoff Street, which ends at the cathedral, have not altered much during the last more than 100 years. Harrigan Centennial Hall on Harbor Drive lies behind the cathedral, while Pioneers' Home is to its left. The restored Russian Bishop's House, home of the first Orthodox Bishop of Alaska, Innocent (Veniaminov), is also nearby, operated by the National Park Service as part of the Sitka National Historical Park.

== History ==
A chapel was built by an employee of Alexander Baranov, the chief manager of the Russian-American Company, in time to receive icons salvaged from the 1813 wreck of the Neva. In 1808 Baranov had shifted his headquarters of operation in North America from Kodiak to New Archangel (Novo-Arkhangelsk) in Southeast Alaska, as it had better fortifications. Despite his previous inattention to the church in Kodiak, in his new base of operations he requested a priest and "the finest of church furnishings." In 1816, Fr. Aleksei Sokolov was the first priest to arrive in Sitka from Russia. He brought the festival icon of St. Michael and the silver-plated icon. The older, now dilapidated, church was replaced by a new building in 1834, also dedicated to St. Michael.

The cathedral was founded and designed by Fr. Innocent Veniaminov, a Siberian-born priest who had worked at Unalaska, Alaska for ten years, where he had designed a two-domed church and also established a school. He designed the cathedral in the Russian ecclesiastical architectural style, for which it has been noted as one of the finest examples of its kind in North America. The foundation stone was laid in 1844, and the cathedral was completed on the 20th of November 1848. The Russian-American Company funded the project. The bells were forged in Alaska, and the clock fixed in the bell tower was made by Innocent. In 1867, Alaska was sold to the United States; Army Major General Jefferson C. Davis arrived in Sitka with several hundred soldiers who pillaged the cathedral, as well as local businesses and residences.

A Temperance Society and Brotherhood formed within the cathedral was instrumental in maintaining the building during the lean years after the Alaska Purchase. In 1909, the society made a scale-model replica of the cathedral and exhibited it at the Smithsonian exposition in San Francisco. During Russian rule in Alaska, patronage from Russian aristocracy brought in significant artistic treasures, which were mostly retrieved from the fire of January 1966 and are now on display in the new cathedral. A notable gift was the icon of Our Lady of Kazan, also called the Sitka Madonna, from the workers of the Russian-American Company. In 1962, the National Park Service inscribed St. Michael Cathedral as a National Historic Landmark.

== Original cathedral ==
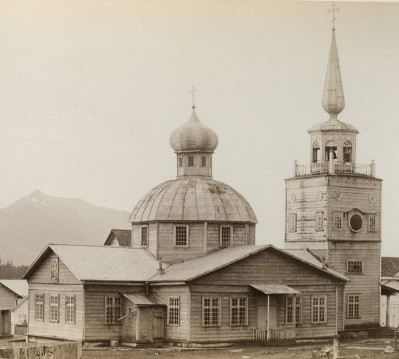
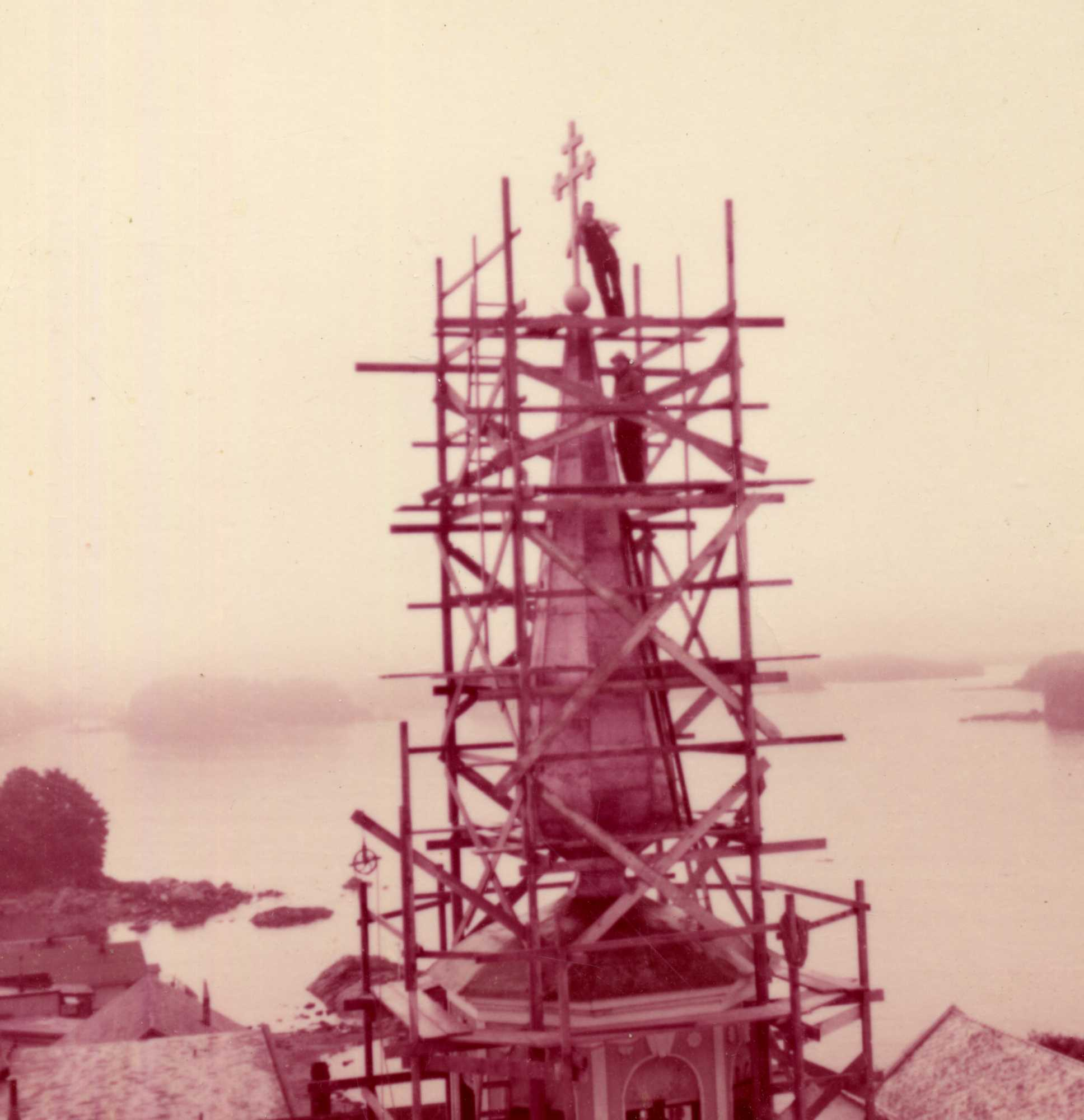
Left: Saint Michael's Cathedral in 1887; right: Replacing the Copper Roof on St. Michael's Cathedral, Sitka Alaska, 1957.
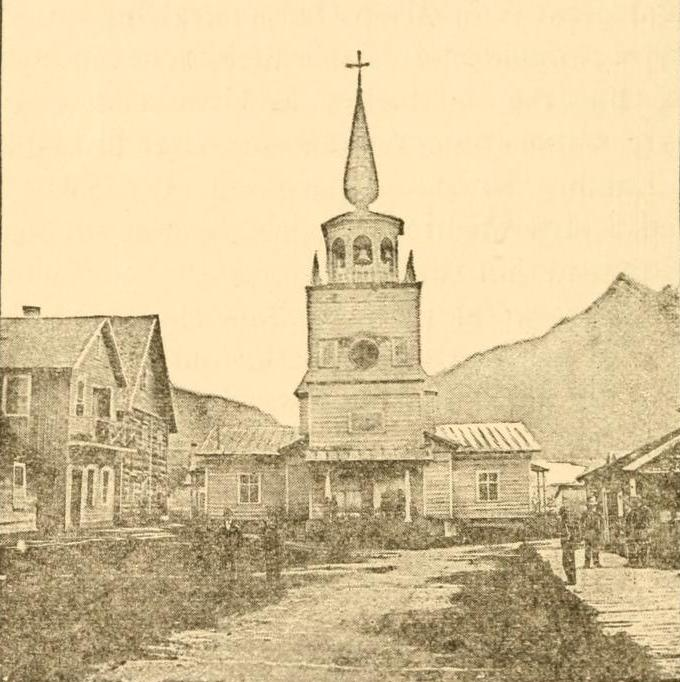
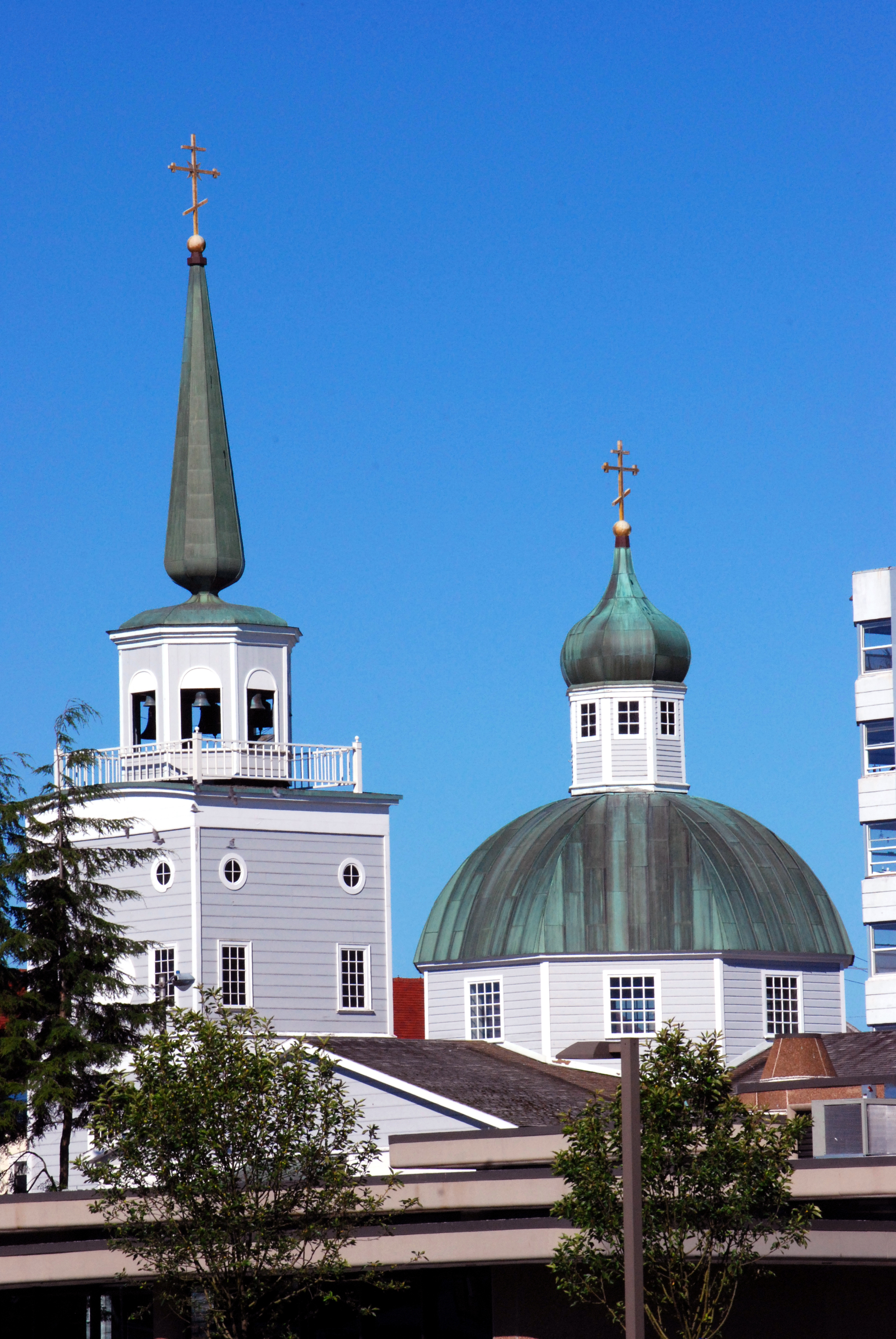
Left: An engraving showing the original cathedral, based on a mid-1880s photograph; right: Sitka, Alaska - Russian Orthodox Church in 2007

The old cathedral, built between 1844 and 1848, remained in good shape with limited modifications for more than one hundred years, until it burned down in January 1966; it had then been the oldest church in Alaska. It had been built with logs of native wood with clapboard siding, domes made of metal and roofs of wood shingle, subsequently changed to asphalt shingles.

The royal doors in the center of the Ikonostasis (a wall of icons and religious paintings, separating the nave from the sanctuary) and the chandelier were the most treasured items retrieved and restored in the new cathedral. The silk and brocade vestments were also retrieved. However, the handmade bells, the large icon of the Last Supper that decorated the top of the royal doors, and the clock in the bell tower were lost. Also lost was the large library containing books in the Russian, Tlingit, and Aleut languages.

== Present cathedral ==
=== Architecture ===
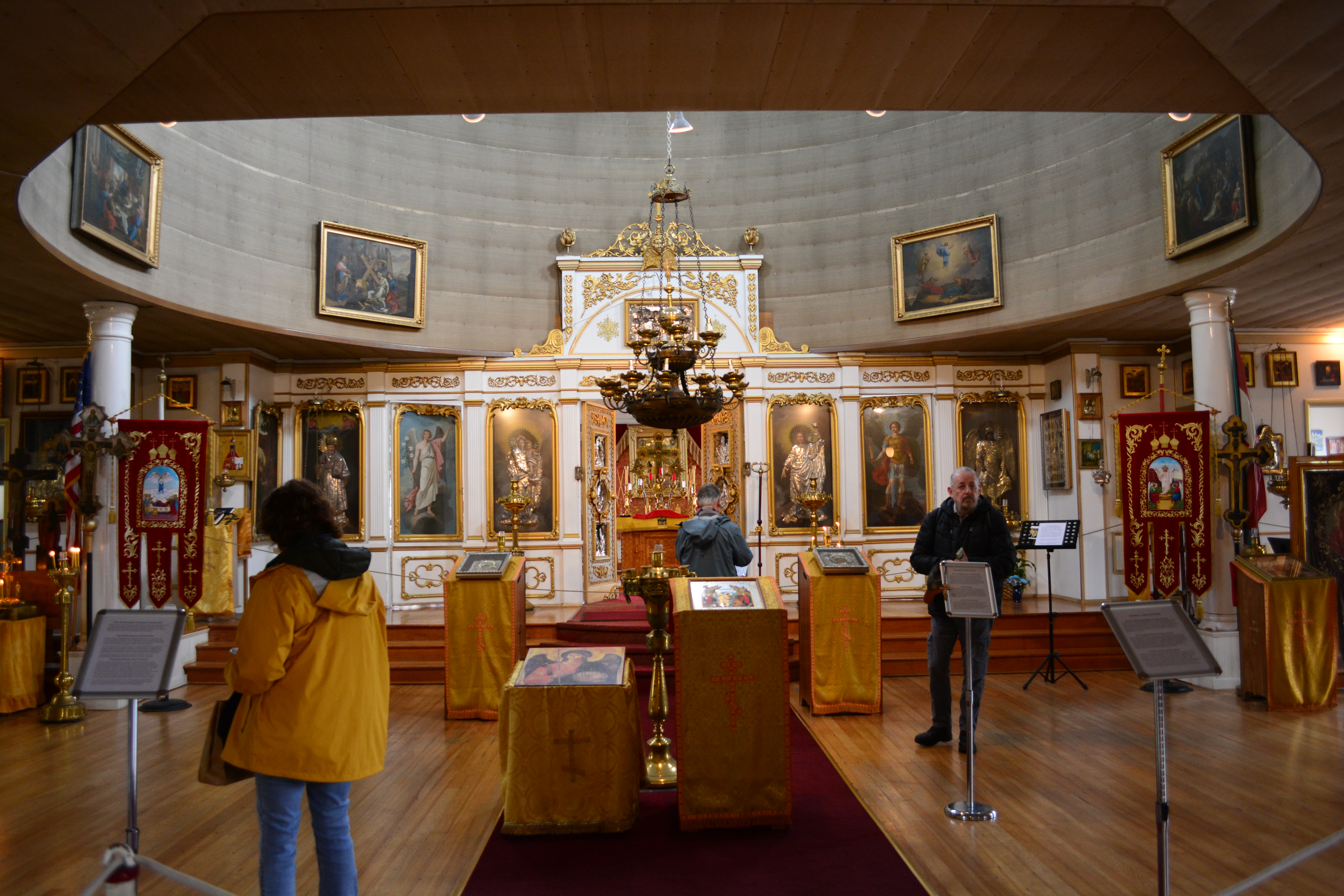
Interior, 2023

Reconstruction was based on 1961 drawings of the old cathedral by the Historic American Buildings Survey. This facilitated building a replica to the same measurements at the same location, but with modern fireproof material in its construction. The materials used in the construction of the new cathedral consisted of concrete and steel with vinyl siding duplicating the original finish, roof covering of asphalt shingles (bitumen-soaked paper covered with aggregate) and copper for the roofing of the domes. The Cathedral of St. Michael was re-consecrated in 1978 by architect Sergey Padyukov. The old Chapel of St. John the Baptist (The Precursor) was renamed in honor of St. Innocent Veniaminov of Alaska. All of the icons and religious artifacts were donated by wealthy Russians and Imperial government officials in the early 19th century; those saved from the fire were reinstalled in the new cathedral in the same order that had existed in the original building. Its frontage is in the form of a Greek cross with a bell tower, which was "neither Byzantine nor Gothic". Similar churches are stated to exist in St Petersburg, in an architectural style dated to late 18th century and early 19th century. It has two domes and one is above the sanctum of the cross.

In plan, the façade and the width of the cathedral are 67 feet (20 m), and its length is 96.6 feet (29.4 m). The exterior surface is painted light blue-grey with white border. The western facade houses the bell tower at the center and measures approximately 40 feet (12 m). It is in the shape of a cupola. It has eight arched openings, each fitted with a bell. The dome is needle-shaped and has a triple-bar Orthodox cross. The cupola is circumscribed by a balustrade. False windows are designed on the top half of the tower. A round clock with Roman numerals and a pediment is fixed between the two 15-light false windows in the north, south, and west directions. A central double door provides entry into the vestibule or narthex of the cathedral in the lower floor of the bell tower, to the east of which is the nave. The cruciform plan of the cathedral is formed by the exterior walls which are extended arms to the west of the two chapels.

The dome is in the shape of an octagon with windows on each side. An onion-shaped dome is built above the structural dome, over an eight-sided cupola. The decorative onion dome is fitted with a three-bar cross at its pinnacle. The cathedral's apse is at the eastern extremity, with dimensions the same as the exterior walls of the nave. There are two chapels, each of the same dimensions, which are aligned along the north and south sides of the nave. A double door (not in use) provides entry to the chapels. The cathedral has public halls that are well-lit. Lighting is natural from the windows fitted in the dome, and also from two large windows fitted in each chapel. The north and south walls of the nave have windows for lighting. Many false windows are also provided as decorations at the façades.

The interior also has a cruciform plan, as in the original cathedral. The walls and ceiling have rough natural-colored sail-cloth covering, as existed in the original cathedral. The western port of the nave has horizontal ceiling of natural-colored sail-cloth, providing access to the center of an open dome enclosing the middle of the naves placed above the Bishop's Throne. Instead of eight columns as in the original, the new cathedral has only four columns, made of steel and concrete and covered with sail-cloth.

=== Fittings ===
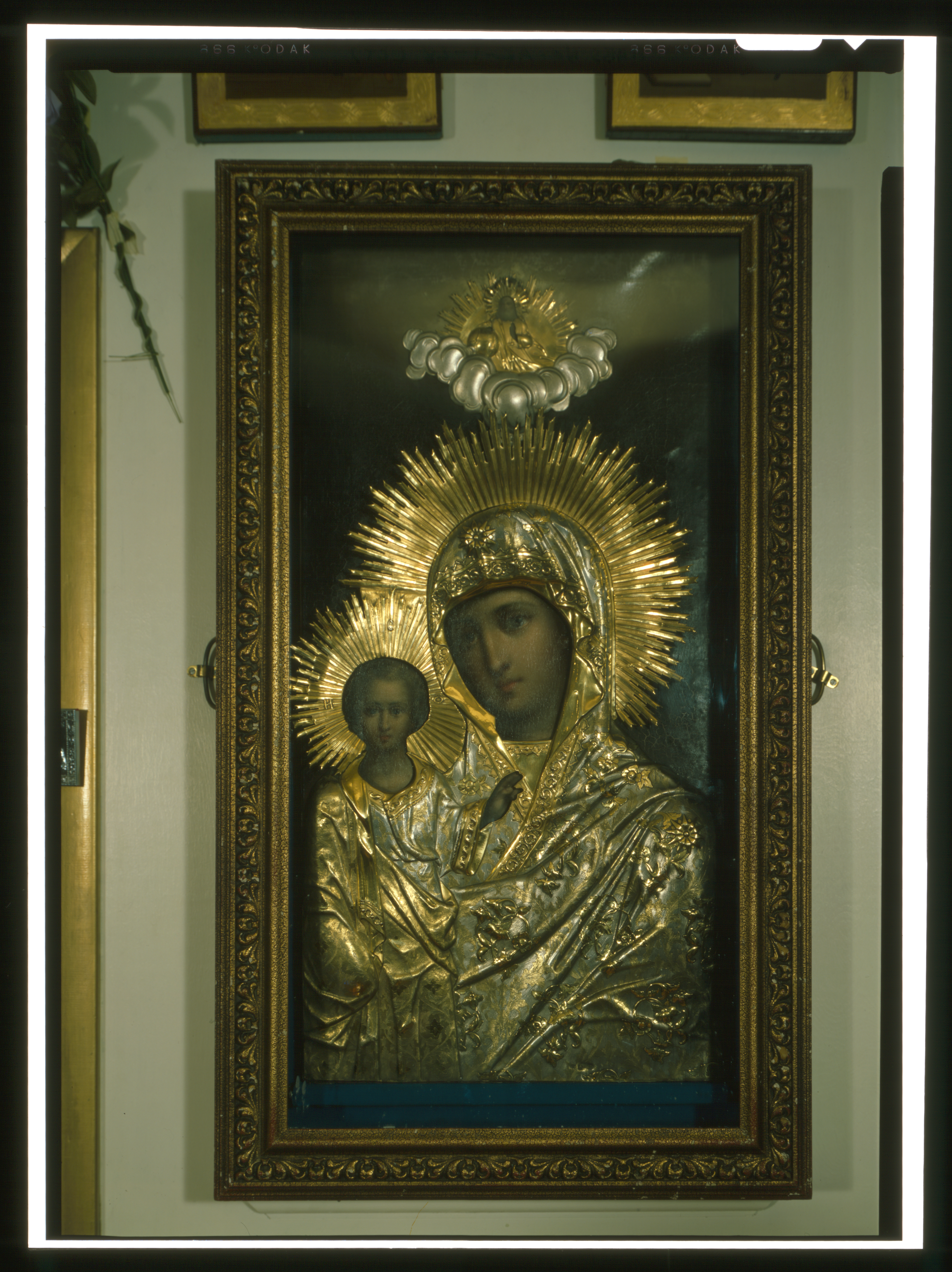
The Sitka Madonna

The interior decorations and fittings consist of the rich and much valued original collection of Russian religious art that had embellished the earlier cathedral. Two notable icons, both by Borovikovsky, are Our Lady of Sitka (familiarly the "Sitka Madonna") and Christ Pantocrator ("Christ the Judge" or "Christ Omnipotent"). The icon screens that divide the nave and the chapels from the altars are hung on the walls; a raised podium at the center of the nave is the bishop's throne, which has a backless cushioned seat, representing the Diocese, and an intricately embroidered carpet or "orlets" used by the bishop while offering divine services. The iconostasis of the main sanctuary, dedicated to the Archangel Michael, has the deacon's doors and royal doors made in the Italian Roccoco design, contrasted to the simple exterior and interior walls. The screen of iconostasis, however, is new, carved out of wood and painted white with gilded border; it is an exact replica made from a small remnant of the original, retrieved from the fire.

The icons are of Christ the Savior and the Virgin Mary, made in eighteenth–nineteenth-century style, and are silver-plated. The icon of the Archangel Michael is depicted on the extreme right and of St. Nicholas on extreme left; they are made in silver but gilded. Also seen are icons of the Four Evangelists on the four corners carved in relief on the door. Icons of the Annunciation and the Theotokos (Mother of God) are carved at the center; all the icons are of recent restoration. Paintings of scenes from the Old and New Testaments, in the style of western religious art, decorate the walls of the dome and the chapel. These were gifts from Count Viktor Kochubey and Countess Anna Orlova, who were close to the Tsars Alexander I (1800–1825) and Nicholas I (1825–1855). Apart from all the decorations in the interior, there are five display cases filled with treasures of the cathedral retrieved from the fire; two are in each chapel and one is in the nave.

== See also ==
- List of National Historic Landmarks in Alaska
- National Register of Historic Places listings in Sitka City and Borough, Alaska
