= Daniil of Bulgaria =

Patriarch of All Bulgaria

His Holiness Daniil
- 29th Patriarch of All Bulgaria; Metropolitan of Sofia
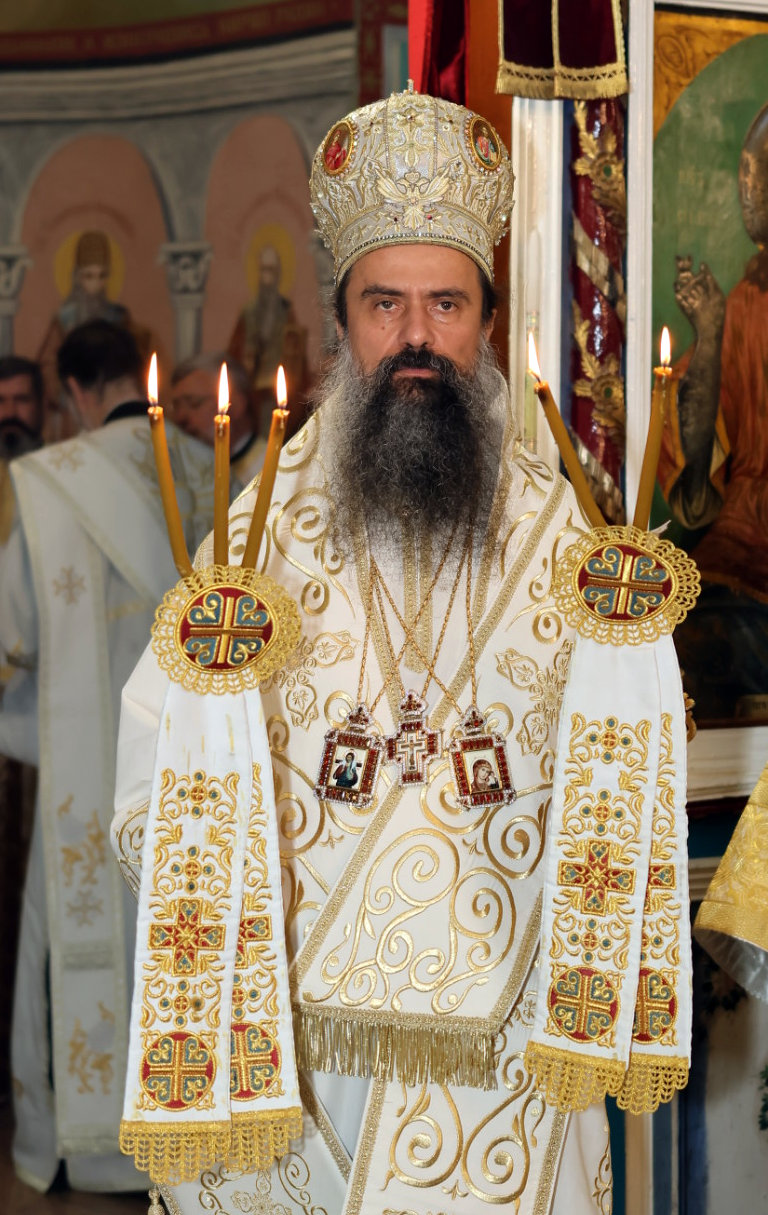
- Daniil in 2026
- Native name: Даниил
- Church: Bulgarian Orthodox Church
- See: Sofia
- Installed: 30 June 2024
- Predecessor: Neophyte
- Previous posts: Metropolitan Bishop of Vidin (2018‍–‍2024); Bishop of Dragovitia (2008‍–‍2018)

Orders
- Ordination: 27 November 2004
- Consecration: 20 January 2008
- Rank: Patriarch

Personal details
- Born: Atanas Trendafilov Nikolov; 2 March 1972 (age 54) Smolyan, Bulgaria
- Denomination: Eastern Orthodox Church
- Signature: Daniil's signature

Patriarch Daniil or Daniel(Bulgarian: Патриарх Даниил; secular name: Atanas Trendafilov Nikolov; Bulgarian: Атанас Трендафилов Николов; born 2 March 1972) is a prelate of the Bulgarian Orthodox Church, currently serving as Patriarch of All Bulgaria since June 2024. Prior to his election, he was the Metropolitan Bishop of Vidin (2018–2024) and bishop of Dragovitia (2008–2018).

== Early life and education ==
Atanas Trendafilov Nikolov was born on 2 March 1972 in Smolyan in the People's Republic of Bulgaria. He completed his primary and secondary education in his hometown and later served in the military. In 1996, he began studying English Philology at Sofia University, but the following year he transferred to the Faculty of Theology of the same university, where he graduated in 2002.

== Episcopate ==
On 21 July 2004, Daniil was sent for obedience to the Rozhen Monastery of the Nativity of the Blessed Virgin Mary. On 27 November of the same year he was ordained hieromonk by his diocesan bishop. On 1 June 2006, he was elevated to the rank of archimandrite. On 20 January 2008, he was consecrated Bishop of Dragovitia and vicar of the diocese of Nevrokop diocese.

On 15 June 2010, Daniil was appointed vicar of the diocese in the US, Canada and Australia of the Bulgarian Patriarchate. On 2 December 2011, the Holy Synod "took note of the letter from Metropolitan Joseph of the USA, Canada and Australia, notifying that permission had been received from the American emigration authorities to fulfill the obedience assigned by the Holy Synod to Bishop Daniil of Dragovitia, who can already leave and take on responsibilities, as metropolitan vicar of the USA, Canada and Australia". He was considered the most likely successor to Metropolitan Joseph Bosakov. On 4 February 2018, he was elected by the Synod to the post of Metropolitan of Vidin. In December 2018, Metropolitan Daniil condemned the Unification Council in Kyiv, Ukraine, calling it uncanonical. In his opinion, the actions of Patriarch Bartholomew are non-canonical since he encroached on another's canonical territory.

== Patriarchate ==
After the death of Patriarch Neophyte in March 2024 and respective mourning period, then-Metropolitan of Vidin, Daniil was one of the three shortlisted candidates to occupy the position of patriarch together with Metropolitan Gregory of Vratsa and Metropolitan Gabriel of Lovech. On 30 June 2024, at the patriarchal electoral Church-People's Council in Sofia, Metropolitan Daniil was elected the new Patriarch of Bulgaria and Metropolitan of Sofia.
