= Orthodox Church in America Archdiocese of Pittsburgh and Western Pennsylvania =

Diocese of the Orthodox Church in America

Coordinates: 40.439465°N 80.004321°W

Archdiocese of Pittsburgh and Western Pennsylvania

orthodox

Location
- Country: United States
- Territory: Pennsylvania, Ohio, and the entirety of West Virginia
- Metropolitan: Tikhon (Mollard)

Information
- Denomination: Eastern Orthodox
- Rite: Byzantine Rite

Current leadership
- Parent church: Orthodox Church in America
- Archbishop: Melchisedek (Pleska)

Map
- The states in which the Archdiocese of Pittsburgh and Western Pennsylvania has jurisdiction.

Website
- midwestdiocese.org

The Archdiocese of Pittsburgh and Western Pennsylvania is a diocese of the Orthodox Church in America (OCA). Its territory includes parishes, monasteries, and missions located in three states in the United States – Pennsylvania, Ohio, and the entirety of West Virginia. The diocesan chancery is located in Cranberry Township, Pennsylvania. The current bishop of Pittsburgh and Western Pennsylvania, Melchisedek (Pleska), was enthroned on June 27, 2009. The previous Archbishop of Pittsburgh and Western Pennsylvania, Kyrill (Yonchev), died on June 17, 2007.

== Bishops ==
- Stephen (Dzyubay) (7 August 1916 - May 1924)
- Alexis (Panteleev) (November 1932 - 1933)
- Benjamin (Basalyga) (10 September 1933 - 1947)
- Dionysius (Dyachenko) (7 December 1947 - 1951)
- Vyacheslav (Lissitzky) (28 October 1951 - 15 December 1952)
- Benjamin (Basalyga) (July 28, 1953 - November 15, 1963)
- Ambrose (Merezhko) (1967 - 1972)
- Theodosius (Lazor) (1972 - 30 October 1977)
- Kyrill (Yonchev) (October 1977 - 17 June 2007)
  - Herman (Swaiko) (2007 - 4 September 2008) locum tenens
  - Tikhon (Mollard) (2008-2009) locum tenens
- Melchisedek (Pleska) (since 27 June 2009)

== Deaneries ==
The diocese is grouped geographically into five deaneries, each consisting of a number of parishes. Each deanery is headed by a parish priest, known as a dean. The deans coordinate activities in their area's parishes, and report to the diocesan bishop. The current deaneries of the Diocese of Western Pennsylvania are:

- Allegheny-Beaver Valley Deanery
- Altoona-Johnstown Deanery
- Monongahela Valley Deanery
- Ohio Valley Deanery
- Pittsburgh Deanery
