= Andrew Petkov =

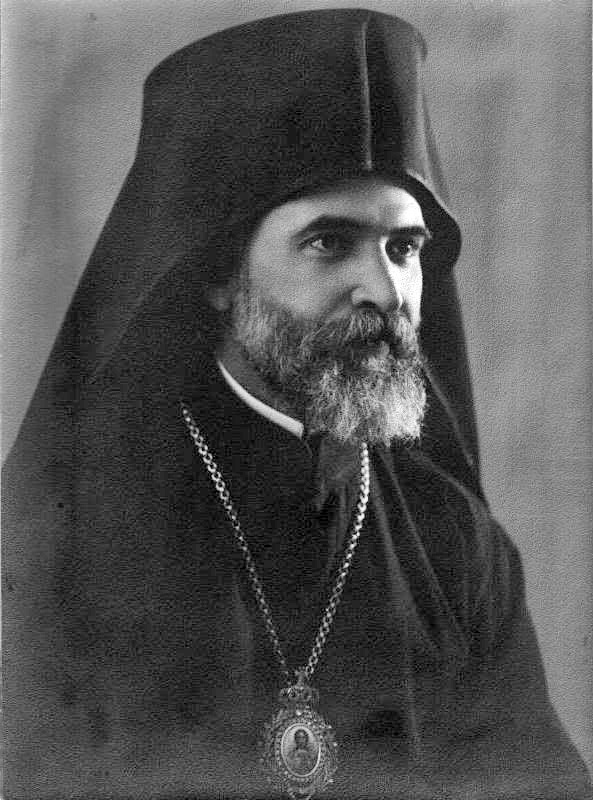
Andrey Velichki

Metropolitan Andrey (Bulgarian: Митрополит Андрей; secular name Stoyan Nikolov Petkov, Bulgarian: Стоян Николов Петков; 31 December 1886 – 9 August 1972) was the diocesan prelate of the Bulgarian Eastern Orthodox Diocese of the USA, Canada and Australia with the title of "Metropolitan of New York" between 1947 and 1972. He is also known as Andrey Velichky or Velichki (Bulgarian: Андрей Велички) and in Bulgarian, as Андрей Нюйоркски, Andrey Nyuyorkski, 'Andrey of New York'.

He was born Stoyan Petkov on 31 December 1886 in Vrachesh, a village in Botevgrad Municipality. He took his comprehensive education in Targovishte. In 1903 he entered the Sofia Seminary where he graduated in 1909 and continued his education in the Moscow Theological Academy in Russia between 1911 and 1916. In the meantime, he served as a medical orderly in the Russian army (1914–1915). After graduating the academy he worked as a teacher in St. Petersburg for two years (1916–1918).

Petkov came back to Bulgaria after bursting out of the Bolshevik revolution in Russia. Again in his motherland he consecutively worked as: a secretary and inspector with the Ministry of Foreign Affairs (1919–1921); a teacher in Sofia Seminary (1921–1926); a head of culture department with the Holy Synod of the Bulgarian Orthodox Church (1926–1929).

In 1928 Stoyan Petkov took "Andrey" (Andreas, Andrew) as his name in religion. After being ordained as hierodeacon and later archimandrite, on 20 April 1929 he became a titular bishop with the title Velichki and appointed as a vicar to Simeon, Metropolitan of Varna and Preslav.

In 1937 the Holy Synod sent Petkov to take control of the Bulgarian Eparchy of USA, Canada and Australia with his seat in New York City, USA.

He died in 1972 and was buried in the St. John of Rila Church, Targovishte that was reconstructed with his donation during the 1970s.

== See also ==
- Bulgarian Orthodox Church
