= Kyrill Yonchev =

Orthodox bishop

His Eminence Kyrill The Most Reverend
- Archbishop of the Bulgarian Diocese and of Western Pennsylvania
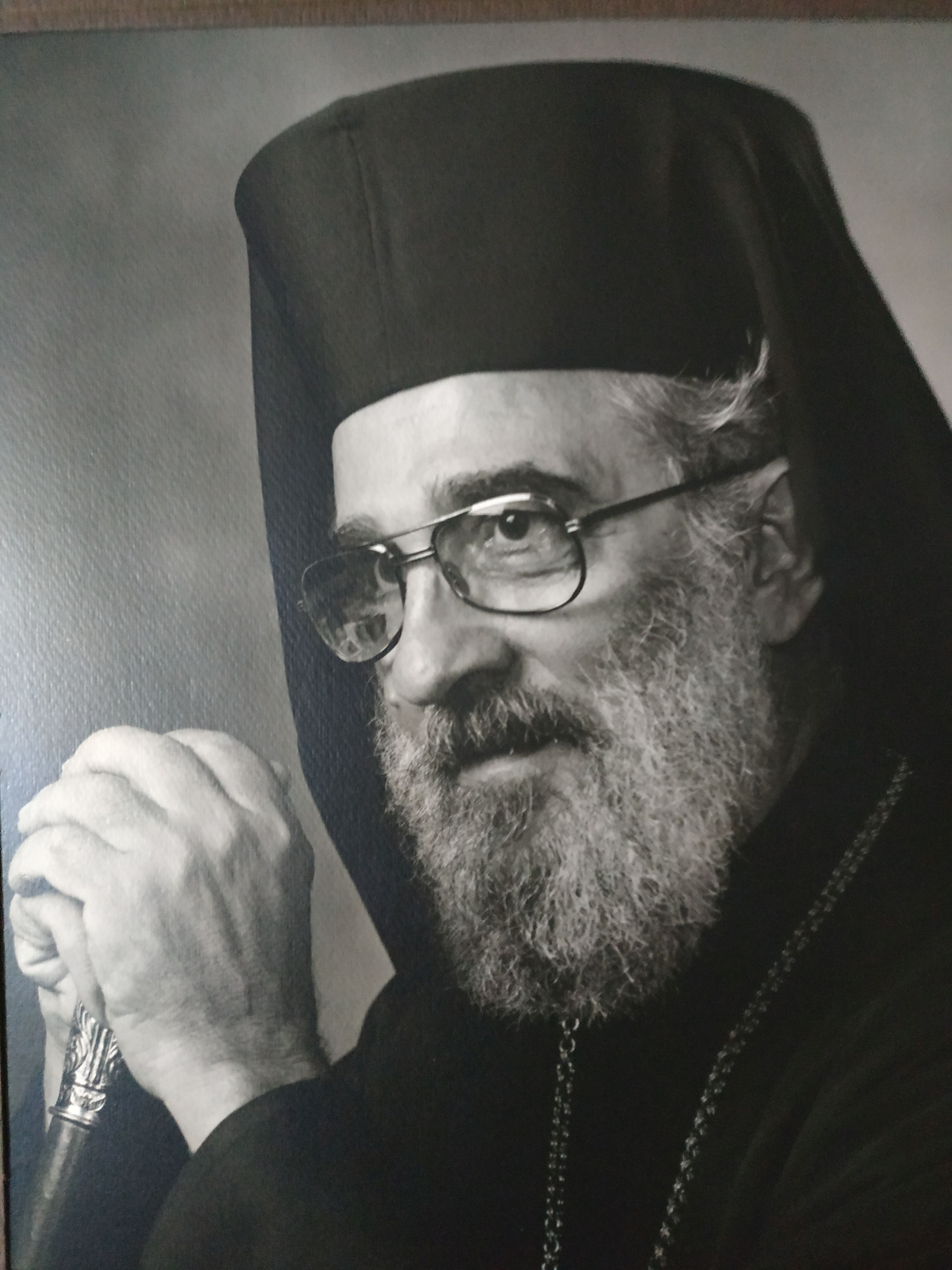
- Archbishop Kirill sometime between 1990 - 1995
- Archdiocese: Bulgarian Diocese; Diocese of the South
- Elected: 1976 (Bulgarian Diocese); 1978 (Western Pennsylvania)
- Predecessor: Theodosius (Lazor) (Western Pennsylvania)
- Successor: Alexander (Golitzin) (Bulgarian Diocses); Melchisedek (Pleska) (Western Pennsylvania)

Personal details
- Born: Ilia Manchov Yonchev; February 26, 1920 Panagyurishte, Bulgaria
- Died: June 17, 2007 (aged 87) Allison Park, Pennsylvania
- Denomination: Eastern Orthodox
- Education: Sofia Theological Seminary

Archbishop Kyrill (Yonchev) (secular name Ilia Manchov Yonchev, Bulgarian: Илия Манчов Йончев; February 26, 1920 – June 17, 2007) was the archbishop of the Orthodox Church in America's Diocese of Western Pennsylvania and Bulgarian Diocese.

== Biography ==
Archbishop Kirill was born as Ilia Manchov Yonchev in Panagyurishte, Bulgaria, on 26 February 1920. In 1940 he graduated from the Saint John of Rila Theological Seminary in Sofia.

On January 19, 1941, he was tonsured to monastic orders and given the name Kyrill. The following day, he was ordained to the diaconate. In April 1943, he was ordained to the priesthood.

In 1944 Father Kyrill graduated from the Saint Clement of Ochrid School of Theology and was appointed instructor of theology in the seminary in Plovdiv, Bulgaria. In the same year, he was named abbot of the Bachkovo Monastery.

In 1946, Father Kyrill was sent to Bern, Switzerland, for advanced studies in theology and philosophy. In 1950, following the communist takeover of Bulgaria, he emigrated to the United States. A short time later, he was assigned pastor of Saint George Bulgarian Orthodox Church, Toledo, OH.

== Bishop ==
In the late 1950s, Metropolitan Andrei (Petkov), leader of the Russian Orthodox Church Outside Russia's Bulgarian Diocese of North and South America and Australia, petitioned to be accepted into the Russian Metropolia but had been rebuffed by them for unclear reasons, so in 1964 he petitioned and was approved by the Holy Synod of the Church of Bulgaria to be readmitted to the Bulgarian episcopacy. One of his clergy, Archimandrite Kyrill (Yonchev), disagreed with his decision and was consecrated by the bishops of the ROCOR to serve as head of the Bulgarian Diocese in Exile. Due partly to Metr. Andrei's advanced age, Bp. Kyrill persuaded many Bulgarian parishes to accept his authority.

In 1976, Bp. Kyrill and his diocese broke from the ROCOR and joined the Orthodox Church in America, thus creating its Bulgarian Diocese.

Archbishop Kyrill died on June 17, 2007, after suffering from ill health for the previous year.

== Notes ==
Eastern Orthodox Church titles
Preceded by —	Archbishop of the Bulgarian Diocese; 1976 – June 17, 2007	Succeeded by Alexander (Golitzin)
Preceded by Theodosius (Lazor)	Archbishop of Pittsburgh and Western Pennsylvania; October 15, 1978 – June 17, 2007	Succeeded by Melchisedek (Pleska)
