= Eastern Orthodoxy in North America =

Eastern Orthodoxy in North America represents adherents, religious communities, institutions and organizations of Eastern Orthodox Christianity in North America, including Canada, Central America, the Caribbean, Mexico, and the United States. Estimates of the number of Eastern Orthodox adherents in North America vary considerably depending on methodology (as well as the definition of the term "adherents").

The vast majority of Eastern Orthodox Christians in North America live in Canada and the United States, and have roots in countries with current or historically large Eastern Orthodox communities, including those of Albanian, Bulgarian, Egyptian, Georgian, Greek, Jordanian, Lebanese, Macedonian, Palestinian, Romanian, Russian, Serbian, Syrian, and Ukrainian ancestry; a growing number of adherents come from other Eastern European and Middle Eastern countries, and from minorities of converted American, Canadian, and Mexican Christians of African, Hispanic/Latin American, East Asian, South Asian, Southeast Asian, and Western European descent.

Statistically, Eastern Orthodox Christians are among the wealthiest Christian denominations in the United States, and tend to be better educated than most other religious groups in America, with a high number of graduate (68%) and post-graduate degrees (28%) per capita. According to Pew Research, in 2024, approximately 1% of U.S. adults, or 2.6 million people, self-identify as Orthodox Christians in the United States.

== Early Russian Orthodox presence in the Americas ==
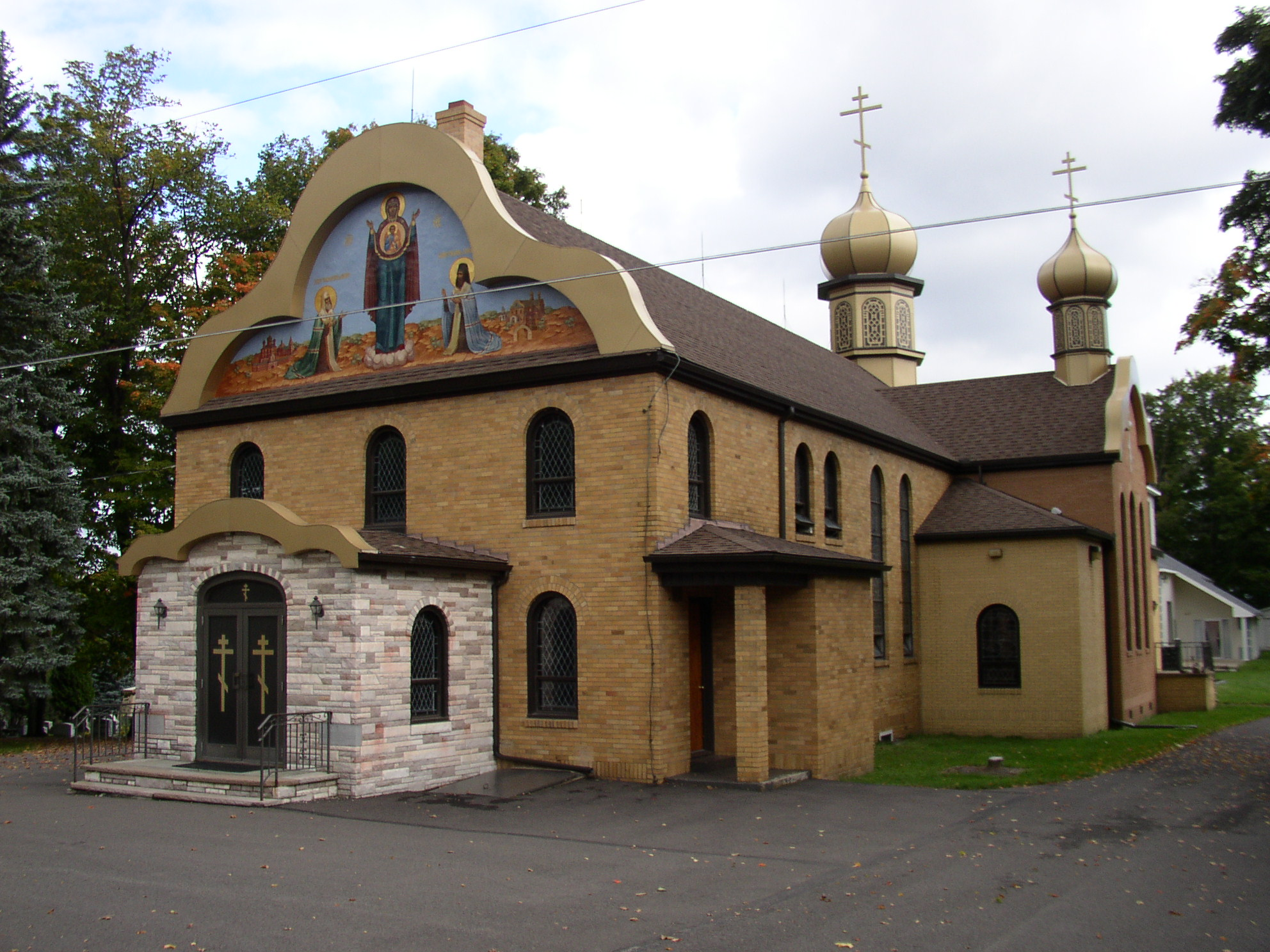
Eastern Orthodox monastery of St. Tikhon in South Canaan, Pennsylvania

Russian traders settled in Alaska during the 18th century. In 1740, a Divine Liturgy was celebrated on board a Russian ship off the northern Pacific Coast, facing the Alaskan Peninsula. In 1794, the Russian Orthodox Church sent missionaries—among them St. Herman of Alaska—to establish a formal mission into Russian-colonized Alaska. Their missionary endeavors contributed to the conversion of many Alaskan natives to Eastern Orthodox Christianity. Then, a Russian Orthodox diocese was established in North America, whose first bishop was St. Innocent of Alaska, although its headquarters were moved from Alaska to California around the mid-19th century.

It was moved again in the last part of the same century, this time to New York. This transfer coincided with a great movement of Eastern Catholics to the Eastern Orthodox Church in the eastern United States. This movement, which increased the numbers of Eastern Orthodox Christians in North America, resulted from a conflict between John Ireland, the Roman Catholic archbishop of Saint Paul, Minnesota, and Alexis Toth, an influential Ruthenian Greek Catholic priest. Ireland's refusal to accept Toth's credentials as a priest induced Toth to join the Eastern Orthodox Church, and further resulted in the conversion of tens of thousands of other Uniate Catholics in North America to the Eastern Orthodox Church, under his guidance and inspiration. For this reason, Ireland is sometimes ironically remembered as the "Father of the Orthodox Church in America". These Uniates were received into Eastern Orthodoxy through the existing North American diocese of the Russian Orthodox Church.

Around the same time, large numbers of Greeks and other Eastern Orthodox Christians were also immigrating to North America. At this time, all Eastern Orthodox Christians in North America were united under the omophorion (Church authority and protection) of the Patriarch of Moscow, through the North American diocese of the Russian Orthodox Church. Under the aegis of this diocese, which at the turn of the 20th century was ruled by the Russian Orthodox bishop and future Patriarch Tikhon, Eastern Orthodox Christians of various ethnic backgrounds were ministered to, both non-Russian and Russian; a Syro-Arab mission was established in the episcopal leadership of St. Raphael of Brooklyn, who was the first Eastern Orthodox bishop to be consecrated in the Americas.

== Orthodox Church in America (OCA) ==
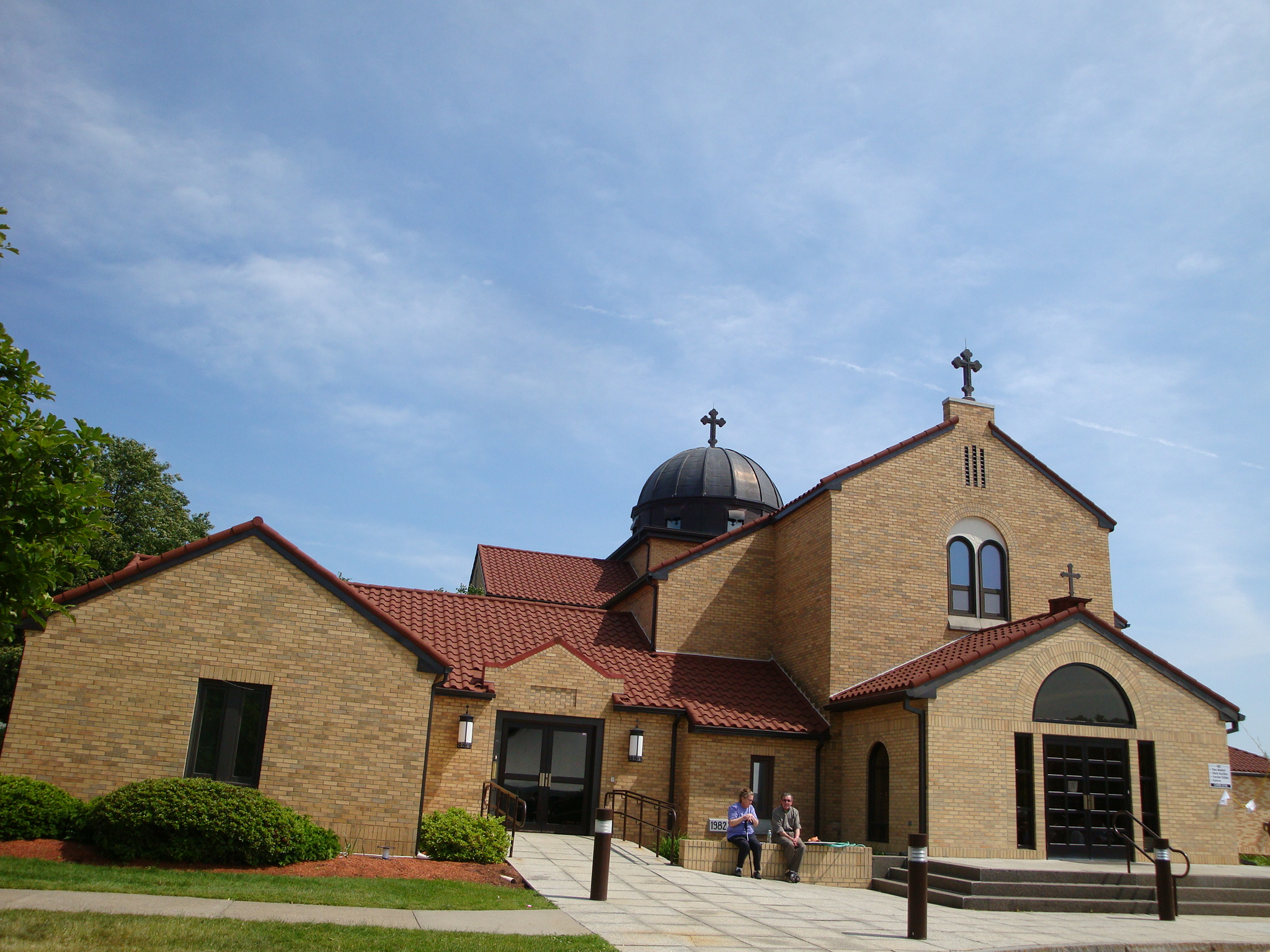
Albanian Orthodox Church in Worcester, Massachusetts

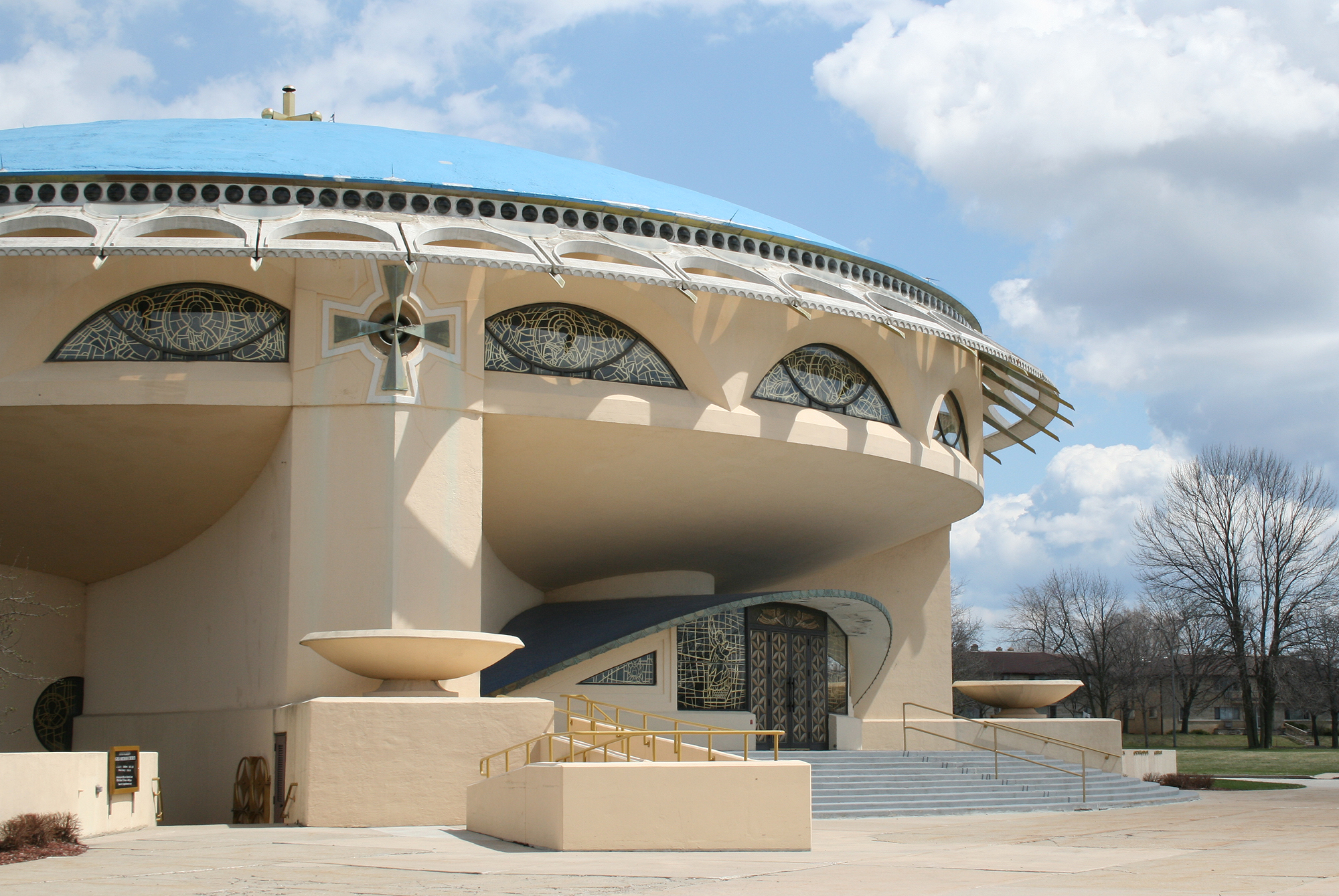
Annunciation Greek Orthodox Church in Wauwatosa, Wisconsin

One of the effects of the persecution and administrative chaos wreaked on the Russian Orthodox Church by the Bolshevik Revolution was a flood of refugees from Russia to the United States, Canada, and Europe. The Revolution of 1917 severed large sections of the Russian church—dioceses in America, Japan, and Manchuria, as well as refugees in Europe—from regular contact with the mother church. In 1920 Patriarch Tikhon issued an ukase (decree) that dioceses of the Church of Russia that were cut off from the governance of the highest Church authority (i.e. the Patriarch) should continue independently until such time as normal relations with the highest Church authority could be resumed; and on this basis, the North American diocese of the Russian Orthodox Church (known as the "Metropolia") continued to exist in a de facto autonomous mode of self-governance. The financial hardship that beset the North American diocese as the result of the Russian Revolution resulted in a degree of administrative chaos, with the result that other national Orthodox communities in North America turned to the churches in their respective homelands for pastoral care and governance.

A group of bishops who had left their sees in Russia gathered in Sremski Karlovci, Kingdom of Yugoslavia, and adopted a clearly political monarchist stand. The group further claimed to speak as a synod for the entire "free" Russian church. This group, which to this day includes a sizable portion of the Russian emigration, was formally dissolved in 1922 by Patriarch Tikhon, who then appointed metropolitans Platon and Evlogy as ruling bishops in America and Europe, respectively. Both of these metropolitans continued to entertain relations intermittently with the synod in Karlovci, but neither of them accepted it as a canonical authority. Between the World Wars the Metropolia coexisted and at times cooperated with an independent synod later known as Russian Orthodox Church Outside Russia (ROCOR), sometimes also called the Russian Orthodox Church Abroad. The two groups eventually went their separate ways. ROCOR, which moved its headquarters to North America after the Second World War, claimed but failed to establish jurisdiction over all parishes of Russian origin in North America. The Metropolia, as a former diocese of the Russian Church, looked to the latter as its highest church authority, albeit one from which it was temporarily cut off under the conditions of the communist regime in Russia.

In the aftermath of World War II, the Patriarchate of Moscow made unsuccessful attempts to regain control over these diasporic communities. After resuming communication with Moscow in early 1960s, and being granted autocephaly in 1970, the Metropolia became known as the Orthodox Church in America (OCA). However, recognition of this autocephalic status is not universal, as the Ecumenical Patriarch (under whom is the Greek Orthodox Archdiocese of America) and some other jurisdictions have not officially accepted it. The reasons for this are complex; nevertheless, the Ecumenical Patriarch and the other jurisdictions remain in communion with the OCA. The Patriarchate of Moscow thereby renounced its former canonical claims in the United States and Canada; it also acknowledged an autonomous Orthodox Church established in Japan that same year.

== Other Eastern Orthodox churches ==
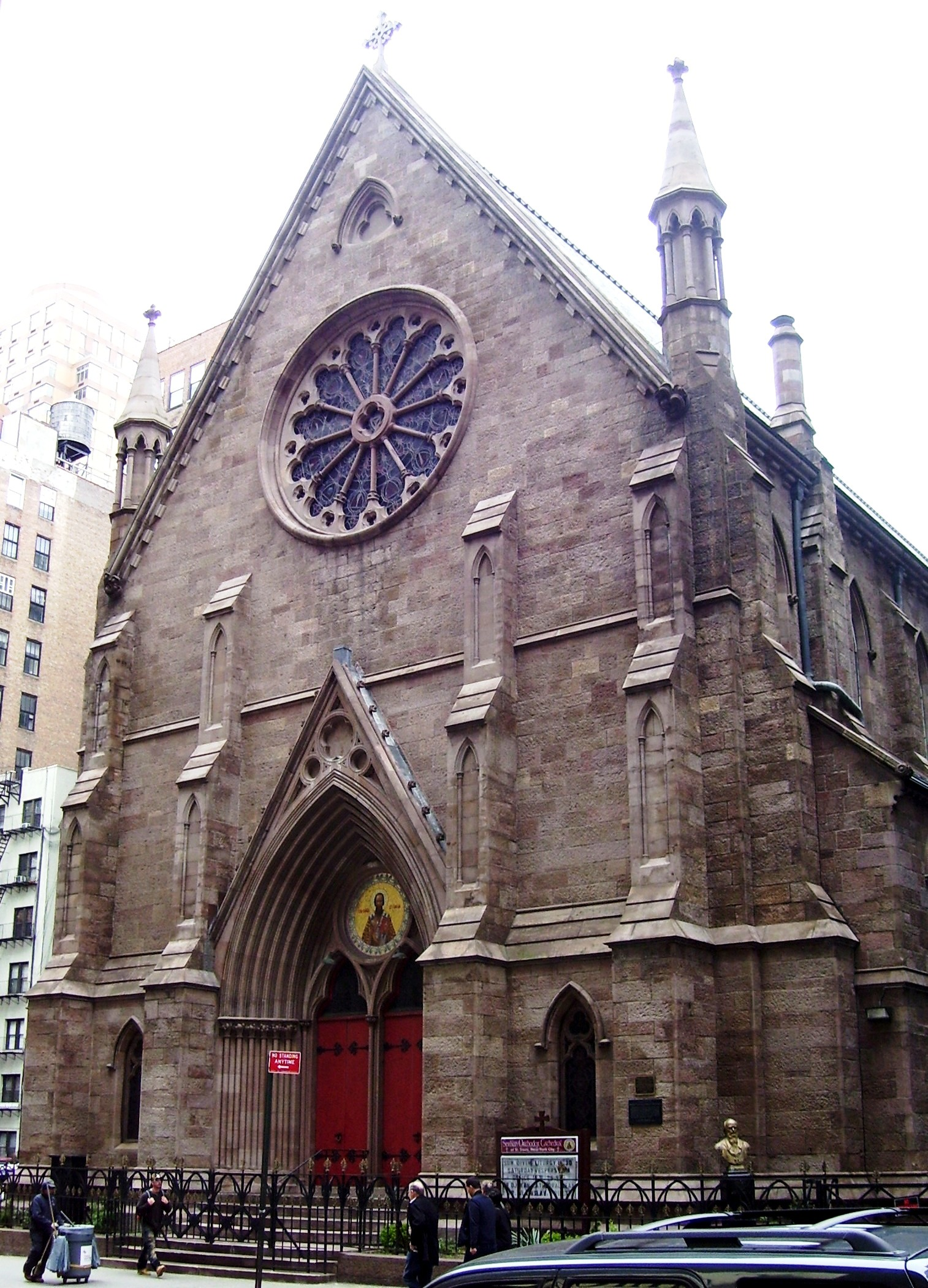
Serbian Orthodox Cathedral of St. Sava in Manhattan, New York City

Today there are many Eastern Orthodox churches in Canada, Mexico, and the United States that are still bound to the Ecumenical or Antiochian patriarchates, or other overseas jurisdictions; in some cases these different overseas jurisdictions will have churches in the same U.S. city. However, there are also many "pan-orthodox" activities and organizations, both formal and informal, among Orthodox believers of all jurisdictions. One such organization is the Assembly of Canonical Orthodox Bishops of the United States of America (successor to SCOBA), which comprises North American Orthodox bishops from nearly all jurisdictions.

During the past 50 years, there have come into existence in North America a number of Western Rite Orthodox parishes. These are sometimes labelled "Western Orthodox Churches" but this term is not generally used by Orthodox Christians of Eastern or Western Rite. These are Orthodox Christians who use the Western forms of liturgy (such as the Roman Rite) but remain Orthodox in their theology. The Antiochian Orthodox Church and ROCOR both have Western Rite parishes.

In June 2002, the Antiochian Orthodox Church granted self-rule to the Antiochian Orthodox Archdiocese of North America. Some observers see this as a step towards greater organizational unity in North America. There are over 2,000 Eastern Orthodox parishes in the United States. Roughly two-thirds of these belong to the Antiochian, Greek, and North American Eastern Orthodox jurisdictions, while the rest are divided among other jurisdictions.

== Demographics ==
=== Churches belonging to the Assembly of Canonical Orthodox Bishops of the United States ===
This is a list of all canonical Eastern Orthodox churches in the United States. Most of them, with exception to Macedonian Orthodox Church, form the Assembly of Canonical Orthodox Bishops of the United States of America. These churches are in full communion with one another, and are all officially recognized by one another. The Orthodox Church in America is regarded as canonical and is in full communion with all the other groups, but its self-governance is questioned.

As of 2020, according to the World Christian Database and World Christian Encyclopedia, published by Edinburgh University Press, there may be as many as 5,460,000 people in the United States who self-identify as Orthodox due to ethnicity or who were baptized in an Eastern Orthodox church. They may also be married in the church and baptize their children in the church, but they remain unknown to parishes and do not participate in church life. Many recent immigrants who have come to America also self-identify as Orthodox, but never participate in church life. The table below does not include either of these categories, limiting itself to those Orthodox believers who attend parish churches at least often enough to be counted in the official parish statistics. They are listed as "adherents." The "regular attendees" are the number of people who attend church on a typical Sunday.

The listing is according to canonical position in the order of the diptychs (the ceremonial rankings of jurisdictions within the Orthodox Church). For each North American branch (archdiocese or diocese), the table also lists the jurisdiction of which it is part. The Orthodox Church in America is a jurisdiction onto itself.

By jurisdiction, in the USA
Parent Jurisdiction	United States branch	Adherents	Regular Attendees	Attendees as % of adherents	Bishops	Monasteries	Parishes	Average Parish Size
Ecumenical Patriarchate of Constantinople	Greek Orthodox Archdiocese	375,972	84,552	22.5%	14	21	534	704
Ecumenical Patriarchate of Constantinople	American Carpatho-Russian Orthodox Diocese	7,156	3,621	50.6%	1	0	77	93
Ecumenical Patriarchate of Constantinople	Ukrainian Orthodox Church of the USA	14,971	6,274	41.9%	4	0	89	168
Ecumenical Patriarchate of Constantinople	Albanian Orthodox Diocese of America	800	160	20%	1	0	2	400
Ecumenical Patriarchate of Constantinople	Vicariate for the Palestinian/Jordanian Communities	6,775	815	12%	1	0	9	753
Ecumenical Patriarchate of Constantinople	Vicariate for the Communities of Slavic Tradition	-	-	-	1	1	9	-
Patriarchate of Antioch	Antiochian Orthodox Christian Archdiocese	71,216	27,897	39.15%	14	2	255	279
Moscow Patriarchate	Russian Patriarchal Parishes in the USA	9,773	1,562	16%	1	2	30	326
Moscow Patriarchate	Russian Orthodox Church Outside of Russia	23,727	9,879	41.6%	12	10	199	119
Serbian Orthodox Church	Serbian Orthodox Eparchies	59,876	8,431	14.1%	4	18	121	495
Romanian Orthodox Church	Romanian Orthodox Metropolis of the Americas	6,439	2,258	35.1%	2	1	32	201
Bulgarian Orthodox Church	Bulgarian Orthodox Diocese	5,386	1,410	26.2%	2	2	24	224
Macedonian Orthodox Church	Macedonian Orthodox Diocese of America and Canada	15,513	1,700	11%	1	0	20	775
Georgian Orthodox Church	Georgian Orthodox parishes in the USA	1,215	473	38.9%	1	1	14	87
Orthodox Church in America	N/A	74,415	32,484	43.7%	15	21	559	133
Total		675,765	183,020	29.8%	72	78	1,945	306

=== Groups whose canonical status is contested ===
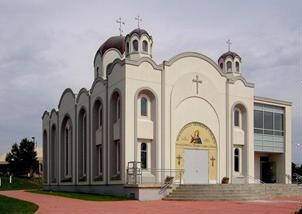
Macedonian Orthodox Church of St. Nedela in Ajax, Ontario

This is a list of major churches within the United States which are not in communion with the Assembly of Canonical Orthodox Bishops of the United States of America, and are therefore not recognized as canonical by the worldwide Orthodox Church. However, these groups regard themselves as canonical, and may or may not recognize other churches as canonical. In 2021, the Orthodox Church of Ukraine established a vicariate for parishes outside of Ukraine, which came to be known as the Vicariate of the Orthodox Church of Ukraine in the United States, Canada, Australia and Japan. The Orthodox Church of Ukraine is recognized by the Ecumenical Patriarchate as canonical but not by the Russian Orthodox Church.

In 2022, the Macedonian Orthodox Church re-entered full communion with the other Eastern Orthodox metropolises; however, the Macedonian Orthodox Diocese of America and Canada did not join either the American or the Canadian Assembly of Canonical Bishops in those countries.

By church, in the USA
Jurisdiction	Adherents	Regular Attendees	Attendees as % of adherents	Bishops	Monasteries	Parishes	Average Parish Size
Holy Orthodox Church in North America	2,212	1,703	77%	2	7	27	82
Vicariate of the Orthodox Church of Ukraine in the United States and Canada	Unknown	Unknown	Unknown	0	0	16	Unknown

==== Eastern Orthodoxy in Canada ====
Adherents of Eastern Orthodox Christianity in Canada traditionally belong to several ethnic communities and ecclesiastical jurisdictions (canonical and non-canonical). According to official 2011 census data, Greek Orthodox Christians constitute the largest Eastern Orthodox community in Canada, with 220,255 adherents. It is followed by other communities: Russian Orthodox (25,245), Ukrainian Orthodox (23,845), Serbian Orthodox (22,780), Romanian Orthodox (7,090), Macedonian Orthodox (4,945), Bulgarian Orthodox (1,765), Antiochian Orthodox (1,220), and several other minor communities within the scope of Eastern Orthodoxy.

- Ecumenical Patriarchate of Constantinople — Albanian Orthodox Diocese of America
- Ecumenical Patriarchate of Constantinople — American Carpatho-Russian Orthodox Diocese
- Ecumenical Patriarchate of Constantinople — Archdiocese of Canada
- Ecumenical Patriarchate of Constantinople — Ukrainian Orthodox Church of Canada
- Greek Orthodox Patriarchate of Antioch — Archdiocese of North America
- Bulgarian Orthodox Church — Diocese of Australia, Canada, and the United States
- Georgian Orthodox Church — Metropolis of Batumi, Lazeti, North America, and Canada
- Romanian Orthodox Church — Diocese of Canada
- Russian Orthodox Church — Patriarchial Parishes in Canada
- Russian Orthodox Church — Russian Orthodox Church Outside of Russia
- Serbian Orthodox Church — Eparchy of Canada
- Macedonian Orthodox Church — Diocese of America and Canada
- Orthodox Church in America — Archdiocese of Canada

== See also ==
- Eastern Christianity
  - Byzantine Rite
  - Eastern Lutheranism
  - Eastern Orthodox theology
  - Eastern Orthodox worship
  - Niceno-Constantinopolitan Creed
  - Organization of the Eastern Orthodox Church
- History of the Eastern Orthodox Church in North America
  - Bibliography of Eastern Orthodoxy in the United States
  - List of American Eastern Orthodox saints
  - List of Eastern Orthodox jurisdictions in North America
  - List of Eastern Orthodox monasteries in the United States
  - Old Believers in North America
  - Timeline of Eastern Orthodoxy in America

=== Notable members ===
- Athenagoras I of Constantinople
- Bishop Karas
- Nicholas Bjerring
- Sevastijan Dabović
- Elpidophoros of America
- John H. Erickson
- Georges Florovsky
- Peter E. Gillquist
- Greek royal family
- Dmitry Grigorieff
- David Bentley Hart
- Stephen C. Headley
- Herman of Alaska
- Agapius Honcharenko
- Innocent of Alaska
- John of Shanghai and San Francisco
- Juvenaly of Alaska
- Alexander Karloutsos
- Philip Ludwell III
- Laurence Mancuso
- Metropolitan Serapion
- John Meyendorff
- Dionisije Milivojević
- Tikhon Mollard
- Dimitrije Najdanović
- Alexander Nemolovsky
- Fan Noli
- Aftimios Ofiesh
- Olga of Alaska
- Patriarch Tikhon of Moscow
- Eugen J. Pentiuc
- Peter the Aleut
- Princess Ileana of Romania
- Raphael of Brooklyn
- Patrick Henry Reardon
- Seraphim Rose
- Platon Rozhdestvensky
- Philip Saliba
- Alexander Schmemann
- Mstyslav Skrypnyk
- Philip Stavitsky
- Agapia Stephanopoulos
- Igor Stravinsky
- Alexis Toth
- Mardarije Uskoković
- Nomikos Michael Vaporis
- Nikolaj Velimirović

== Bibliography ==
- Cavalcanti, H. B.; Chalfant, H. Paul (Winter 1994). "Collective Life as the Ground of Implicit Religion: The Case of American Converts to Russian Orthodoxy". Sociology of Religion. 55 (4). Oxford and New York: Oxford University Press on behalf of the Association for the Sociology of Religion: 441–454. doi:10.2307/3711981. ISSN 1759-8818.
- FitzGerald, Thomas (2007). "Eastern Christianity in the United States". The Blackwell Companion to Eastern Christianity. Malden, Massachusetts: Blackwell Publishing. pp. 269–279. ISBN 9780470766392.
- Volkov, Dmitro (2005). "Living Eastern Orthodox Religion in the United States". In Roudometof, Victor; Agadjanian, Alexander; Pankhurst, Jerry (eds.). Eastern Orthodoxy in a Global Age: Tradition Faces the Twenty-First Century. Walnut Creek, California, Lanham, Maryland, New York City, Oxford, U.K., and Toronto, Canada: AltaMira Press. pp. 224–244. ISBN 9798216297048. LCCN 2004026329.
- Vuković, Sava (1998). Istorija Srpske pravoslavne crkve u Americi i Kanadi: 1891–1941 (Историја Српске православне цркве у Америци и Канади: 1891–1941) [History of the Serbian Orthodox Church in America and Canada, 1891–1941]. Kragujevac, Serbia: Kalenić Press. ISBN 9788682425014.
