= Ancient Faith Radio =

Orthodox Christian Internet radio station

Ancient Faith Radio (AFR) is an Orthodox Christian Internet radio station, a division of Ancient Faith Ministries (AFM), a department of the Antiochian Orthodox Christian Archdiocese of North America. In addition to its two streaming stations, Ancient Faith Music and Ancient Faith Talk, as well as live church service streaming and call-in shows, AFR features more than one hundred podcasts hosted by a variety of contributors, including both clergy and laity of the Orthodox Church.

Although AFM is a part of the Antiochian Archdiocese, like all of its ministries, AFR is specifically designed to be "pan-Orthodox," with both content creators and listeners from a variety of Orthodox traditions. While most of its audience is Orthodox, AFR also has a significant listener base among Christians of other traditions.

AFR has featured some of the more prominent figures in English-language Orthodox Christian media, including Kh. Frederica Mathewes-Green, the late Fr. Thomas Hopko, Sister Vassa Larin, Abbot Tryphon Parsons, Fr. Patrick Henry Reardon, Fr. Andrew Stephen Damick, Dr. Jeannie Constantinou, Fr. John Oliver, and Elissa Bjeletich.

== Overview ==
In 2004, John Maddex founded Ancient Faith Radio after a career as the division manager of Moody Institute's 35 radio stations and radio work for Focus on the Family. In 2008, under the leadership of Maddex, AFR combined with Conciliar Press (formed in 1977 as part of what became the Evangelical Orthodox Church) to form Conciliar Media Ministries, which, in 2013, was renamed Ancient Faith Ministries (with the publishing division renamed Ancient Faith Publishing).

Originally AFR primarily featured Orthodox worship music, interspersed with quotes from the Bible and the Church Fathers as well as a "Saint of the Day" segment. Later, podcasts were added with teaching-oriented broadcasts from such figures as Fr. Thomas Hopko and Fr. Patrick Henry Reardon. The first daily podcast was The Path with Fr. Thomas Soroka, added in 2007.

In 2009, Ancient Faith Radio received 135,000 iPod downloads a month. (Note: Maddex, John. "Ancient Faith Radio Introduces New Internet Stations". Antiochian Orthodox Christian Archdiocese of North America.) Station manager Bobby Maddex conducted a survey of the station's listeners in 2011 and found that converts to Orthodox Christianity outnumbered those raised in the Orthodox Church nearly three to one. (Note: Maddex, Bobby. "Ancient Faith Radio Announces Survey Results". Antiochian Orthodox Christian Archdiocese of North America.)

== See also ==
- History of the Orthodox Church in North America
- Orthodox Christian worship
- The Lord of Spirits (podcast)
