= Orthodox Study Bible =

Eastern Orthodox Bible in English

- Full name: Orthodox Study Bible
- Abbreviation: OSB
- NT published: 1993
- Complete Bible published: 2008
- Authorship: Saint Athanasius Academy of Orthodox Theology
- Textual basis: OT: Alfred Rahlfs' edition of the Septuagint; NT: Textus Receptus
- Translation type: Formal Equivalence
- Publisher: Thomas Nelson, Inc.
- Copyright: Copyright 2008 Thomas Nelson, Inc.
- Religious affiliation: Eastern Orthodoxy
- Genesis 1:1–3 In the beginning God made heaven and earth. The earth was invisible and unfinished; and darkness was over the deep. The Spirit of God was hovering over the face of the water. Then God said, "Let there be light"; and there was light. John 3:16 For God so loved the world that He gave His only begotten Son, that whoever believes in Him should not perish but have everlasting life.

The Orthodox Study Bible (OSB) is an Eastern Orthodox study Bible published by Thomas Nelson in 2008. It uses an English translation of the Septuagint by the Saint Athanasius Academy of Orthodox Theology for the Old Testament, and the New King James Version (NKJV) for the New Testament.

== History ==
According to The Sacramento Bee, the most substantial contributors to the OSB were Paul Goetz, Rev. Richard Ballew, and Rev. Jack Sparks. All three men were of the Saint Athanasius Academy of Orthodox Theology, the organization which oversaw the project. In 1993, the trio published a partial translation of the Bible with Thomas Nelson, titled the The Orthodox Study Bible: New Testament and Psalms. The originators of the 1993 text were all described as being "fairly recent evangelical converts to the Orthodox faith", with many of them being newly ordained clergy. In 1997, the book was republished by Conciliar Press with additional study material.

Work on a complete Bible began in early 1998, under the auspices of the LXX Project. The work was funded solely through donations, and continued until the full Bible's publication in February 2008.

The Bible's development was developed also helped by other scholars, such as Eugen Pentiuch. The project was further edited by an overview committee, which included fourteen archbishops, metropolitans, and bishops from various Eastern Orthodox jurisdictions, as well as eight priests and seven lay scholars.

== Content ==
=== Translation and textual basis ===
The original edition of the OSB, released in 1993, included only the New Testament and Psalms, both taken from the NKJV, which was chosen because the NKJV translation is based on the Greek Textus Receptus used by the Eastern Orthodox Church.

The 2008 edition of the OSB includes the full Orthodox canon. It retains the NKJV for the New Testament. The Old Testament is a translation of the Septuagint developed by St. Athanasius Academy of Orthodox Theology. The translation uses the NKJV Old Testament as the base text, but alters it where it differs from the Septuagint, with Alfred Rahlfs' edition of the Septuagint used and Brenton's English translation serving as additional reference material. One feature therefore is that New Testament quotations of the Old Testament are identical in wording between the Old and New Testaments (e.g. Gen 1:27; Matt 19:5; Mark 10:7-8; 1 Cor 6:16; Eph 5:31).

=== Study materials ===
The translations of the Old Testament and New Testament are accompanied by commentary from the Orthodox viewpoint. Articles provide guidance and support for many facets of the Orthodox faith which can be confusing or unknown to those unacquainted with the Church. There is a comparative of list of contents, side-by-side with the Roman Catholic canon and the generally accepted Protestant canon. The OSB addresses such questions as: "Why is the Mother of God essential to the Faith?", "Who were the Seventy Disciples?", "How is an Orthodox understanding of the Bible different from a Roman Catholic or Protestant understanding?". In addition, the OSB provides basic daily prayers, a lectionary for personal use, and reproductions of icons in its pages.

== Reception ==
Chronicling the text's history up to 2007, author Matthew Francis described its reception as "mixed". He described the Bible as receiving a "generally warm reception" and "quite successful" sales, despite numerous "academic and doctrinal critics" taking negative views towards the text.

In 2008, The Sacramento Bee characterized the Orthodox Study Bible as "drawing raves from both religion scholars and the faithful in the pews" in the months after its full publication that year.

=== Hierarchical response ===
Although not an official text of the Eastern Orthodox Church, the publication has received positive endorsements from such prominent bishops as Metropolitan Maximos of Pittsburgh (Greek Orthodox Archdiocese of America), Metropolitan Phillip (Antiochian Orthodox Church) and Metropolitan Theodosius (Orthodox Church in America). The text's publication was also blessed by all the bishops of the Standing Conference of the Canonical Orthodox Bishops in America.

=== Critical response ===
Brian A. Butcher, deacon in the Ukrainian Greek Catholic Church, views it as an important step for Eastern Orthodox Christians in understanding the Eastern Orthodox interpretation in an English translation, but notes that limitations may apply for liturgical and devotional use, unless they closely align with Eastern Orthodox tradition.

Theologian and independent researcher Cyril Kennedy critiqued it negatively, identifying three central issues: he argues that it presents itself as a patristic study Bible yet does not seriously engage in biblical scholarship, several sections adopt a polemical tone toward non-Eastern Orthodox traditions, and that historical statements are oversimplified, which makes it lean towards a devotional book rather than a scholarly resource.

== See also ==
- Septuagint § English translations
