= List of Eastern Orthodox writers in North America =

This is a list of Eastern Orthodox writers in North America.

== List ==
- Scott Cairns
- Georges Florovsky
- Thomas Hopko
- Frederica Mathewes-Green
- John Meyendorff
- Jonathan Pageau
- George Papaioannou
- Jaroslav Pelikan
- Patrick Henry Reardon
- Seraphim Rose
- Nicholas Samaras
- Alexander Schmemann
- Frank Schaeffer
- Tryfon Tolides
- Constantine Cavarnos
- David Bentley Hart
- Rod Dreher
- Nomikos Michael Vaporis
