= New Covenant Apostolic Order =

1970s American Christian organization

The New Covenant Apostolic Order (NCAO) was a Christian organization formed in the 1970s by former Campus Crusade for Christ (CCC) leaders seeking to implement a syncretic view of the church incorporating elements of Eastern Orthodox, evangelical, and Shepherding movement teaching and practices.

== Background ==
In 1968, Jon Braun, the National Field Coordinator for Campus Crusade for Christ, Jack Sparks and five other top CCC program administrators—Peter Gillquist, Richard Ballew, Gordon Walker, Ken Berven, and Ray Nethery—left the movement to explore founding New Testament churches. The following year, Jack Sparks started the Christian World Liberation Front (CWLF) in Berkeley, California. Dissatisfied with the results of their work, the seven men began to reestablish contacts in the early 1970s. In the interim, Jon Braun and Richard Ballew had adopted a hierarchical model of church administration based on Shepherding movement teachings.

After a few meetings—during which the group divvied up a list of topics which included church history, worship, and doctrine—the group concluded in a February 1975 gathering that the church should be liturgical and have a visible hierarchical authority structure. Ray Nethery, who had taken the task of studying the Protestant Reformation, was skeptical, however. Thus, the seven and the congregations associated with them were split into two camps, one gravitating toward an Eastern Orthodox view of the church and the other toward a Reformational view. The men then endeavored to form the groups associated with them into congregations. The attempt by Jack Sparks to do this with the CWLF in Berkeley resulted in a split and subsequent dissolution of the group.

== History ==
In a November 1975 meeting in Corpus Christi, Texas, the seven men adopted the name New Covenant Apostolic Order. The NCAO council held its first meeting on June 28 to July 1, 1976. On the last day, the NCAO council issued a statement declaring the start of the order and defining the basic characteristics, doctrines, and government of the order and of the churches it would establish. The order consisted of the seven founders plus thirteen other men. The order's government included the General Apostolic Council (the seven), Regional Apostolic Councils (all NCAO members in an area), and the Council (all the members of the order and all the elders from all the churches). The members of the order were referred to as apostles or apostolic workers. Elders who were answerable to the apostles were to govern the churches. The NCAO implemented its own liturgy and in its teaching stressed the personal authority of the apostles and congregational elders and a strong clergy/laity distinction.

To train its clergy in its views, the NCAO established the St. Athanasius Academy of Orthodox Theology in Goleta, California. The AOT awarded degrees ranging from a Bachelors in Sacred Music to a Doctor of Theology, though AOT faculty lacked the credentials to award advanced degrees in these fields and it had no defined course of study and was unaccredited. That same year, Thomas Nelson Publishers hired Peter Gillquist, who was the putative head of the NCAO, to be its new books editor. Gillquist used his position to induce Thomas Nelson publish books by Braun, Sparks, and Berven, as well as papers associated with "The Chicago Call", an endeavor in which four of the NCAO apostles participated, though only two declared their NCAO affiliation.

In the summer of 1977, the NCAO split, as those in the eastern part of the United States—led by Nethery—refused to adopt as binding papers prepared by those from the western U.S. The central issue was the Western contingent's insistence on binding individual consciences to the decisions of church leaders, decisions which extended into members' personal lives. On January 16, 1978, those remaining on the NCAO council sent a letter of excommunication to all of the NCAO-related congregations in which they condemned the "Eastern dissenters." Controversy dogged the NCAO, particularly related to their view of the personal authority of the leadership.

=== Evangelical Orthodox Church ===
On February 14, 1979, the six remaining members of the NCAO General Apostolic Council dressed themselves in robes, formed a circle, laid hands on one another, and ordained themselves as bishops. The following day they announced the formation of the Evangelical Orthodox Church. The NCAO remained as the "mission arm" of the church. The NCAO was dissolved when most of the EOC congregations joined the Antiochian Orthodox Christian Archdiocese of North America. At that time, the apostles and bishops were downgraded to priests, since bishops in Eastern Orthodoxy are required to be celibate.
