= Hellenic College Holy Cross Greek Orthodox School of Theology =

Orthodox Christian college in Brookline, Massachusetts

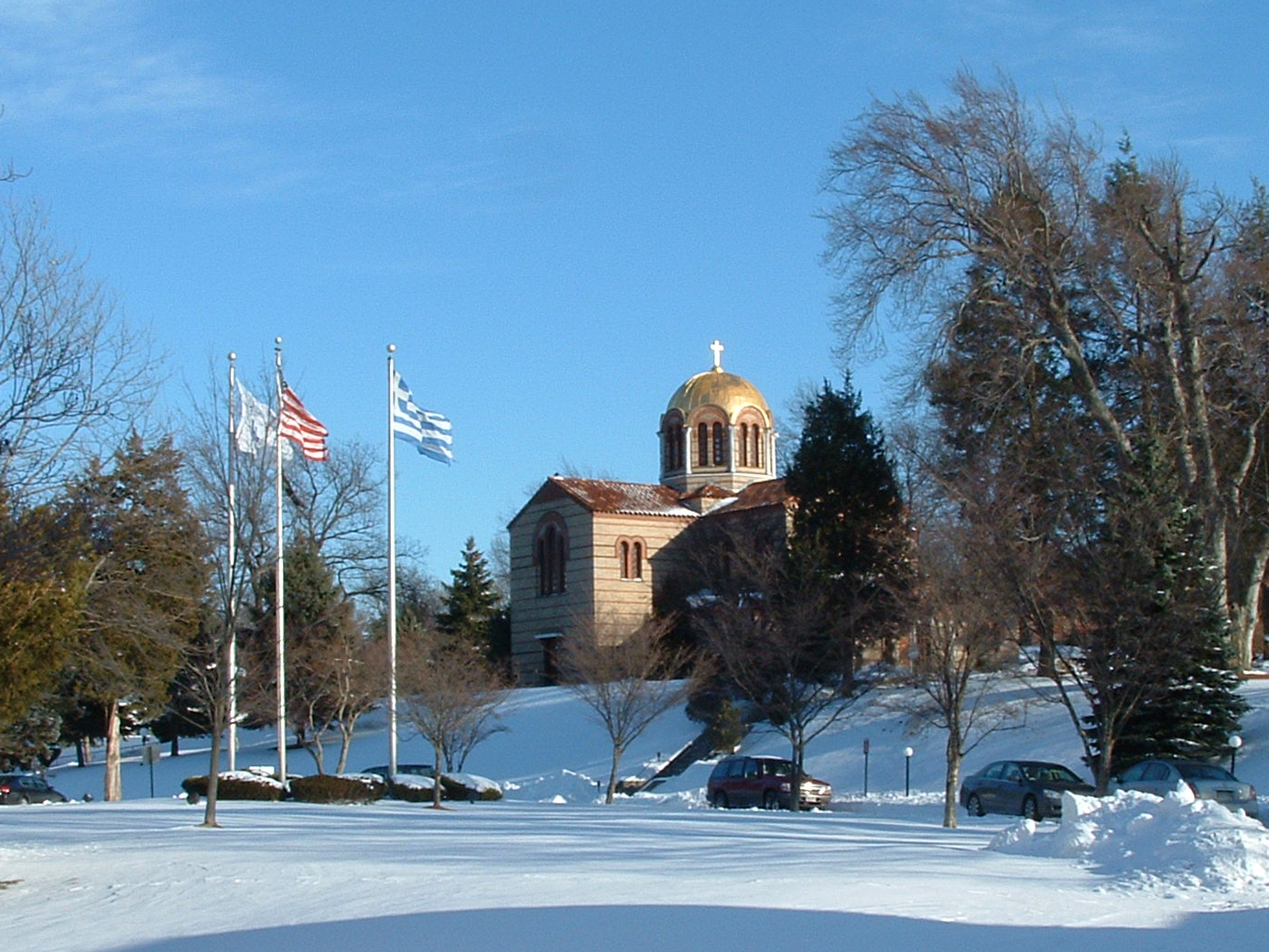
- Chapel of the Holy Cross, Hellenic College
- Former names: The Greek Archdiocese Institute; Holy Cross Theological School
- Motto: Ἐν ἀρχῇ ἦν ὁ λόγος
- Motto in English: In the beginning was the Word
- Type: Private liberal arts college and seminary
- Established: 1937
- Accreditation: NECHE (Hellenic College); ATS (Holy Cross Greek Orthodox School of Theology)
- Religious affiliation: Greek Orthodox Archdiocese of America
- Chairman: Archbishop Elpidophoros of America
- President: Michael Lambakis (interim)
- Academic staff: 36 total (fall 2023)
- Undergraduates: 64 (fall 2023)
- Postgraduates: 135 (fall 2023)
- Location: 50 Goddard Ave, Brookline, Massachusetts, United States; 42°19′1.53″N 71°7′44.54″W
- Campus: 52 acres (21 ha); Urban
- Website: hchc.edu

Hellenic College Holy Cross Greek Orthodox School of Theology (HCHC) is a private Eastern Orthodox liberal arts college and seminary in Brookline and Boston in Massachusetts. The institution is composed of two schools. These are Hellenic College, an undergraduate liberal arts college, and Holy Cross Greek Orthodox School of Theology, a graduate theological school and seminary. The institution is affiliated with the Greek Orthodox Archdiocese of America.

In 1937, the institution was founded by Archbishop Athenagoras I of Constantinople and the Greek Orthodox Archdiocese of America in Pomfret, Connecticut, as The Greek Archdiocese Institute. Its name was soon changed to Holy Cross Theological School, and was moved to Brookline, Massachusetts, in 1947. The institution reached its modern structure in 1968, when it established an undergraduate liberal arts college, Hellenic College, alongside the postgraduate theological school and seminary, now called the Holy Cross Greek Orthodox School of Theology. Both schools were first accredited in the 1970s.

Hellenic College Holy Cross is the only accredited Eastern Orthodox college, seminary, and graduate school of theology in both the United States, and the Western Hemisphere as a whole.

== History ==
=== Origins ===
Archbishop Athenagoras of America soon after his enthronement became convinced that a seminary was needed in America to prepare American born man for the priesthood. At the 1936 Clergy-Laity Congress, he announced that the school would open next year in Pomfret, Connecticut, on an estate owned by the Archdiocese, bought for a song during the Great Depression. In 1937, Pomfret seminary was established as The Greek Archdiocese Institute, which would soon become known as Holy Cross Theological School.

The establishment of the seminary in Pomfret was a bold experiment, fraught with difficulties. Demetrios Michaelides, who entered the seminary in the 1937, remembered: "The first year was very hard. We were isolated. Being the first class of the start of the seminary was a challenge. The school had very little money, which was a hardship for all. There was not much money for food or books or other supplies. People from Boston and Worcester would bring food for us."

The seminary reached its current location in 1947, when it moved from Pomfret to Brookline, Massachusetts.

=== Creation of modern structure ===
In 1968, Holy Cross expanded its undergraduate division into a full four-year liberal arts college named Hellenic College.

In 1974, Hellenic College was first accredited by the New England Commission of Higher Education, and the Holy Cross Theological School was first accredited by the Association of Theological Schools the same year.

=== 21st century ===
In the spring of 2019, the college was warned by the state of Massachusetts and its accreditor of financial problems. This led to the college announcing measures to ameliorate financial difficulties, and the resignation of the institution's then president, Christopher Metropulos. By late 2019 and early 2020, Hellenic College Holy Cross was put on probation by the NECHE, and considered at risk of losing its accreditation. The college was removed from probation in March 2021, with the NECHE finding progress in relevant areas.

== Organization and administration ==
Michael Lambakis is the current president of HCHC. The institution is also administered by a board of trustees. The chairman of the institution's Board of Trustees is Archbishop Elpidophoros of America.

== Academics ==
=== Degrees ===
Hellenic College offers programs leading to the Bachelor of Arts degree.

Holy Cross Greek Orthodox School of Theology offers graduate programs of study leading to the degrees of Master of Divinity (M.Div), Master of Theological Studies (M.T.S.), and Master of Theology (Th.M).

=== Accreditation ===
Since 1974, Hellenic College has been accredited by the New England Commission of Higher Education (NECHE), and Holy Cross School of Theology has been accredited by the Association of Theological Schools in the United States and Canada (ATS). Hellenic College Holy Cross is the only accredited Orthodox Christian college, seminary, and graduate school of theology in the United States and the Western Hemisphere. Holy Cross is also a member of the Boston Theological Interreligious Consortium.

=== Enrollment and faculty ===
In the fall of 2023, HCHC had 64 undergraduate students enrolled, and 135 graduate students enrolled.

At that time, HCHC had 15 full-time faculty and 18 working part-time, with 3 assistants also employed.

== Campus ==
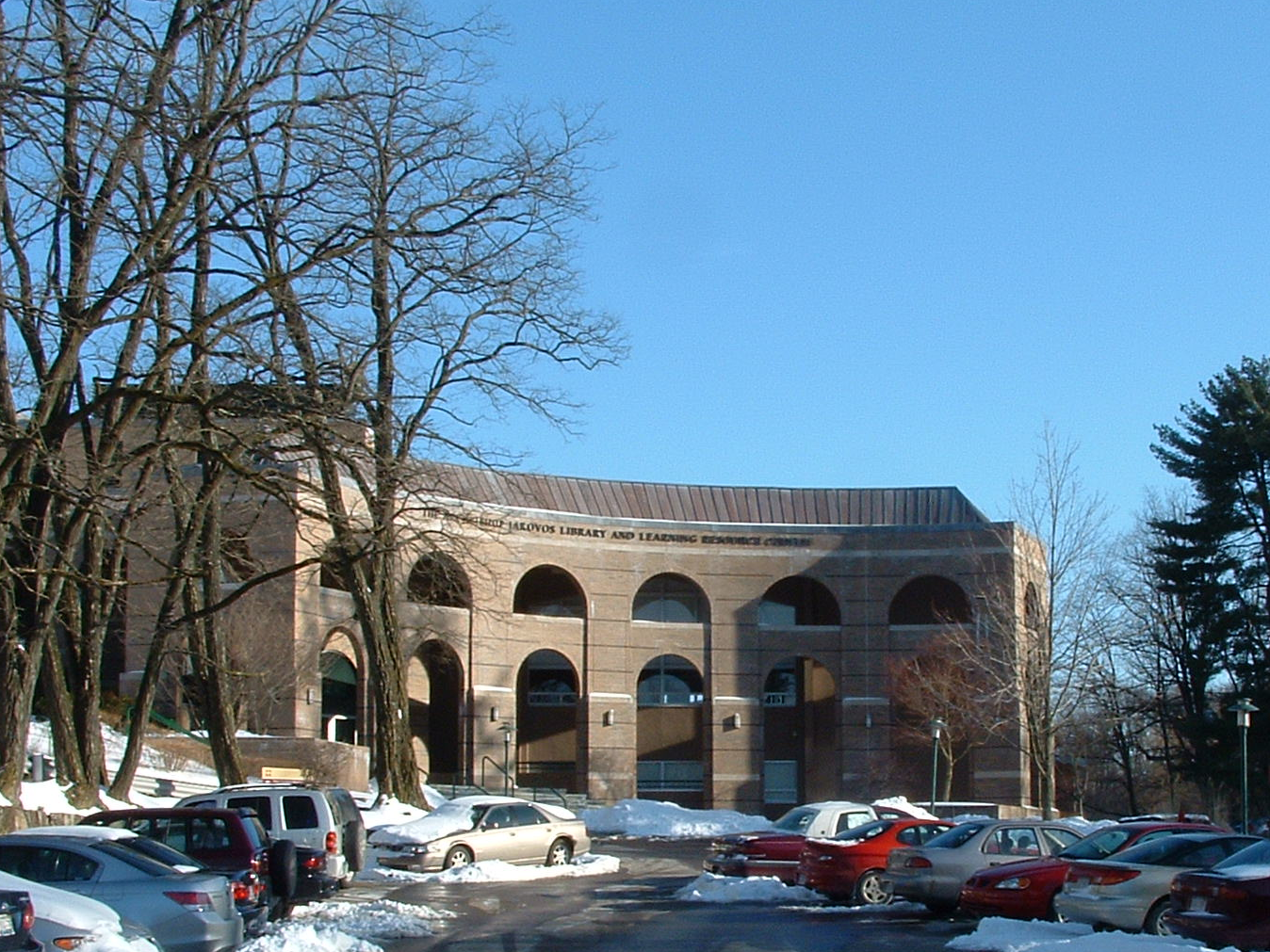
Archbishop Iakovos Library, Hellenic College

Hellenic College Holy Cross is located on a 52-acre (21 ha) campus in Brookline, Massachusetts, just outside Boston. The campus is located on the former Weld estate. It is notable for having been the longtime practice site of the Boston Celtics.

The institution is located near the Holy Transfiguration Monastery, which is part of the non-canonical Holy Orthodox Church in North America.

== Other programs and activities ==
=== Other educational programs ===
The Semester of Faith program allows undergraduate students from outside HCHC to continue working towards a bachelor's degree while studying at Hellenic College for a semester.

In 2025, HCHC and the Boston College Woods College of Advancing Studies, started a program in which students can complete the core curriculum at HCHC, and then transfer to Woods College to receive one of six career focused majors.

HCHC administers summer programs for those who do not study full time at the college. One, called CrossRoad is a ten-day, vocational exploration program for Orthodox Christian high school graduates and rising seniors. Two sessions are held on campus each summer. The Pappas Patristic Institute is a seminar based program that focuses on readings in the Church Fathers. This program is geared towards undergraduate and graduate students.

=== Greek Orthodox Theological Review ===
Starting in 1954, the faculty of the institution have published The Greek Orthodox Theological Review, a journal publishing scholarly works related to Orthodox Christianity, particularly Greek Orthodoxy.

== Notable people ==
=== Notable faculty ===
- Georges Florovsky
- Eugen J. Pentiuc
- John Romanides
- Nomikos Michael Vaporis

=== Notable alumni ===
- Bishop Bishop Andrei (Hoarște) of Cleveland
- Archbishop John Pelushi of Tiranë, Durrës and All Albania
- Archbishop Nikitas (Lulias) of the Greek Orthodox Archdiocese of Thyateira and Great Britain
- Metropolitan Philip (Saliba) of the Antiochian Orthodox Christian Archdiocese of North America (did not graduate)
- Metropolitan Evangelos (Kourounis) of Sardes, titular bishop of the Ecumenical Patriarchate of Constantinople
- Metropolitan Gerasimos (Michaleas) of the Greek Orthodox Metropolis of San Francisco
- Metropolitan Isaiah (Chronopoulos) of the Greek Orthodox Metropolis of Denver
- Metropolitan Methodios (Tournas) of the Greek Orthodox Metropolis of Boston
- Metropolitan Nicholas (Pissare) of the Greek Orthodox Metropolis of Detroit
- Metropolitan Savas (Zembillas) of the Greek Orthodox Metropolis of Pittsburgh
- Bishop Andonios (Paropoulos) of Phasiane, auxiliary bishop and Chancellor of the Greek Orthodox Archdiocese of America
- Bishop Demetrios (Kantzavelos) of Mokissos, auxiliary bishop and Proistamenos of the St. Photios Greek Orthodox National Shrine
- Bishop Dimitrios (Couchell) of Xanthos, titular bishop of the Ecumenical Patriarchate of Constantinople
- Bishop Kyrillos (Abdelsayed), auxiliary bishop for Christian Education and Dean of St. Athanasius and St. Cyril Theological School in the Coptic Orthodox Diocese of Los Angeles, Southern California, and Hawaii
- Demetrios Constantelos
- Emmanuel Lemelson
- Alexander Karloutsos

=== Interments ===
- Archbishop Iakovos (Koukouzis) of America
- Bishop Gerasimos (Papadopoulos) of Abydos
- Metropolitan Silas (Koskinas) of New Jersey
