= Philip Saliba =

Lebanese-American Antiochian Orthodox archbishop

His Eminence The Most Reverend Philip (Saliba)
- Archbishop of New York and; Metropolitan of All North America
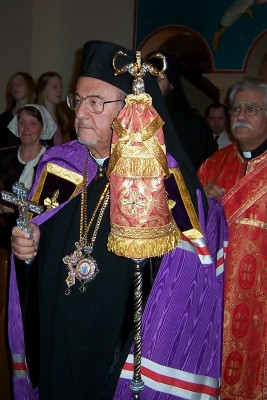
- Metropolitan Philip (Saliba)
- Native name: فيليب صليبا
- Church: Orthodox Church of Antioch
- Archdiocese: Antiochian Orthodox Christian Archdiocese
- See: New York City
- Elected: August 5, 1966
- In office: 1966-08-14 – 2014-03-19
- Predecessor: Anthony (Bashir)
- Successor: Joseph (Al-Zehlaoui)

Personal details
- Born: Abdullah Saliba; 1931-06-10 Abou Mizan, Lebanon
- Died: March 19, 2014 (aged 82) Fort Lauderdale, Florida
- Buried: Antiochian Village; 40.3016958°N 79.1510099°W
- Education: BA History 1958 Wayne State University; MDiv 1965 Saint Vladimir's Orthodox Theological Seminary

Ordination history
History
Diaconal ordination
- Date: 1949
Priestly ordination
- Ordained by: Anthony (Bashir)
- Date: 1959-03-01
Episcopal consecration
- Consecrated by: Theodosios VI (Abourjaily)
- Date: 1966-08-14
- Place: Monastery of the Prophet Elias, Dhour Shouier, Lebanon

Metropolitan Philip (Saliba) (Arabic: فيليب صليبا) (born Abdullah Saliba; 10 June 1931 Abou Mizan, Lebanon – 19 March 2014 Fort Lauderdale, Florida) was a Lebanese Orthodox prelate who served as Archbishop of New York, Metropolitan of All North America, and primate of the Antiochian Orthodox Christian Archdiocese of North America. He held the position from 1966 until his death in March 2014. His tenure as an Orthodox bishop was the longest in American history.

== Education ==
Saliba was educated at Balamand Orthodox Theological Seminary in Lebanon and at schools in Syria. He later studied in England at the Anglican Kelham Theological College and the University of London. After moving to the United States he studied at Holy Cross Greek Orthodox School of Theology and at Wayne State University, where, in 1958, he received a Bachelor of Arts degree in history.

On 1 March 1959, Saliba was ordained to the priesthood by Metropolitan Anthony (Bashir) and assigned to the pastorate at St. George Church in Cleveland, Ohio.

He undertook graduate theological studies at Saint Vladimir Orthodox Theological Seminary in Yonkers, New York, and received a Master of Divinity degree in 1965.

In March 1966, the Antiochian Archdiocese, meeting in special convention, nominated Saliba to succeed the late Metropolitan Anthony (Bashir) as Archbishop of New York and Metropolitan of all North America. (Note: "Elected Archbishop". Des Moines Register. Des Moines. Associated Press. 1966-08-11. p. 3 – via Newspapers.com.) In July 1966, the Patriarchal Vicar for the widowed See of New York, Metropolitan Ilyas (Kurban), Archbishop of Tripoli, elevated Saliba to the dignity of archimandrite.

Saliba was elected for the See of New York by the Holy Synod of the Antiochian Patriarchate on 5 August 1966, and on 14 August 1966 was consecrated to the episcopacy by Patriarch Theodosios VI (Abourjaily) at the Monastery of the Prophet Elias in Dhour Shouier, Lebanon. Saliba was enthroned at the Cathedral of Saint Nicholas in Brooklyn, New York, on 13 October 1966.

In 1977, the two Antiochian Jurisdictions in North America merged. Metropolitan Philip was chosen to lead them.

Twenty years after the radical nineteen-sixties, the Jesus People were losing steam and some of them had begun pursuing New Testament Christianity, forming the Evangelical Orthodox Church. After studying the ancient Church through to the time of the East-West Schism, contact was made with the Greek Archdiocese and the Orthodox Church in America. The EOC leaders, led by Fr. Peter E. Gillquist, approached Metropolitan Philip. After an extended process, Metropolitan Philip brought 17 Evangelical Orthodox Parishes into the Antiochian Orthodox Christian Archdiocese of North America.

In 1966, Metropolitan Philip expressed his hope that, within 25 years, i.e., by 1991, the Orthodox jurisdictions in the United States would be united administratively. As of 2022, 56 years later, that vision has yet to be realized as they are still "unfortunately divided by nationalistic barriers."

== Works ==
- ———— (1979). Allen, Joseph J. (ed.). Out of the depths have I cried: thoughts on incarnational theology in the Eastern Christian experience. Brookline, Massachusetts: Holy Cross Orthodox Press. ISBN 978-0-9165-8632-4. LCCN 79017811. OCLC 5239820. OL 4414033M.
- ———— (1987). Allen, Joseph J. (ed.). Feed my sheep: the thought and words of Philip Saliba on the occasion of his twentieth year in the episcopacy. Crestwood, New York: St. Vladimir's Seminary Press. ISBN 978-0-8814-1066-2. LCCN 86031579. OCLC 15054096. OL 2737092M.
- ———— (2009). Allen, Joseph J. (ed.). Meeting the incarnate God: from the human depths to the mystery of fidelity. Brookline, Massachusetts: Holy Cross Orthodox Press. ISBN 978-1-9353-1701-2. LCCN 2008046018. OCLC 268547439. OL 22684617M.
- ———— (2009). Allen, Joseph J. (ed.). And He Leads Them: The Mind and Heart of Philip Saliba. Conciliar Press. ISBN 978-1-8882-1229-7. OCLC 52379850.

== See also ==
- Greek Orthodox Patriarchate of Antioch
- Antiochian Greek Christians
- Antiochian Orthodox Christian Archdiocese of North America
- Assembly of Canonical Orthodox Bishops of the United States of America

Eastern Orthodox Church titles
Preceded by Anthony (Bashir)	Archbishop of New York and All America (Antiochian); 1966 – 2014	Succeeded by Joseph (Al-Zehlaoui)
