= Demetrios Kantzavelos =

Demetrios
- Auxiliary Bishop of Mokissos
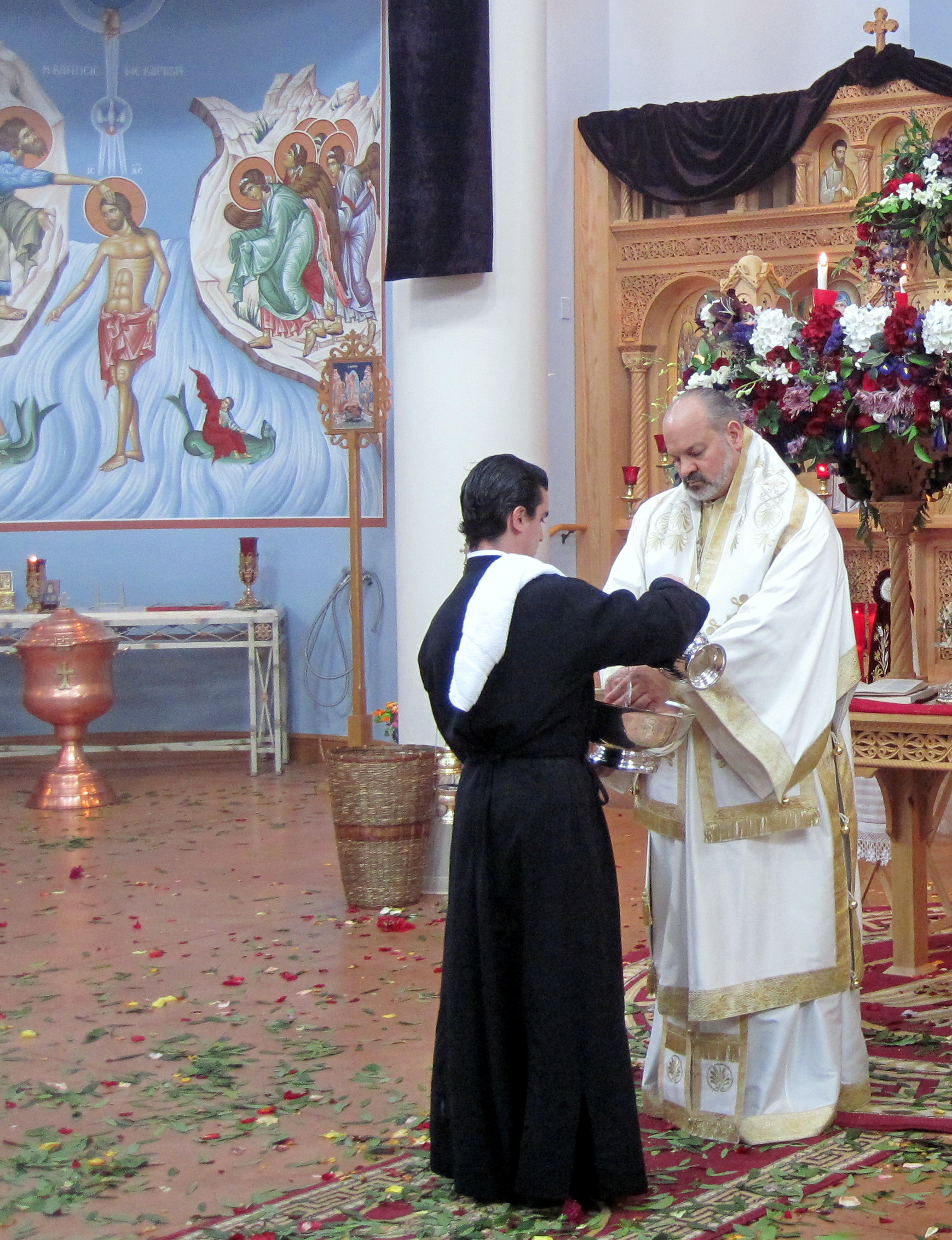
- Archdiocese: Greek Orthodox Archdiocese
- See: Mokissos

Orders
- Ordination: October 1989

Personal details
- Born: Demetrios Kantzavelos; 1962 (age 63–64) Chicago, Illinois
- Denomination: Greek Orthodox
- Parents: Merope (Kossivas) and Christ Kantzavelos
- Education: Hellenic College/Holy Cross

Demetrios (born Demetri Kantzavelos, Greek: Δημήτριος Καντζαβέλος) is a Greek American Orthodox prelate who serves as Proistamenos of the St Photios Greek Orthodox National Shrine in St. Augustine, Florida, and the Synodal Liaison of the Assembly of Canonical Orthodox Bishops in the USA to the Orthodox Christian Mission Center (OCMC), also headquartered in St. Augustine.

He was formerly the auxiliary bishop of Mokissos of the Greek Orthodox Metropolis of Chicago which includes parishes in Illinois, Indiana, Wisconsin, Missouri and Iowa. The Metropolis, whose offices are located in Chicago, Illinois, consists of 58 parishes which minister to the needs of approximately 250,000 Greek Orthodox faithful.

Named as "one of the twelve people to watch" by the Chicago Sun-Times (January 5, 2003), Bishop Demetrios worked to improve relationships between Chicago's Greek Orthodox Community with other local Orthodox bodies, as well as other Christian and non-Christian groups.

== Early life and education ==
A native of Chicago born to first-generation Greek-Americans, Merope (Kossivas) and the late Christ J. Kantzavelos, Demetrios grew up as an active participant in the city's Assumption Greek Orthodox Community. He went on to attend Hellenic College and Holy Cross Greek Orthodox School of Theology in Brookline, Massachusetts, where he obtained his graduate divinity degree “with high distinction” in 1987. Following graduation, he pursued post-graduate doctoral work in the philosophy program of Chicago's Loyola University, concentrating in the area of metaphysics.

== Ordinations ==
Having received monastic tonsure, Demetrios was ordained to the Diaconate October 1989. In 1992, he was ordained to the priesthood, and in 1995 elevated to the rank of Archimandrite, by Metropolitan Iakovos of Chicago. Since then he served as assistant and deacon to the bishop, as associate pastor of Annunciation Cathedral of Chicago, and as Chancellor of the Metropolis of Chicago.

Demetrios was consecrated as the Bishop of Mokissos on December 9, 2006, following his election to that post by the Holy Synod of the Ecumenical Patriarchate in Phanar, Constantinople, Turkey.

In 2013, Demetrios was appointed Chancellor of the Holy Metropolis of Chicago. On February 10, 2018, following the election of Metropolitan Nathanael (Symeonides) of Chicago, Demetrios began a one-year sabbatical.

== Career ==
In February 2003, Demetrios co-founded a local initiative to improve relations between the Turkish and Greek communities in Chicago, culminating in him being named the recipient of the 2010 “Fethullah Gulen Award” from the Niagara Foundation, a Turkish/Muslim-American group in Chicago, inspired by Fethullah Gulen, a leading Turkish Muslim, advancing interfaith and intercultural dialogue.

Demetrios was President of the Council of Religious Leaders of Metropolitan Chicago from 2008 to 2009. The Council is composed of chief leaders of the Chicago area faith communities and embraces a broad diversity of theological and religious traditions.

As of 2013 he was a current representative of the Greek Orthodox Archdiocese of America to the National Council of Churches of Christ (NCCCUSA). He served as the chairperson of several of its committees.

In 1992 Demetrios established the Bishop's Task Force on AIDS, the first formal Orthodox Christian response to this pandemic in the western hemisphere. He was named Outstanding Community Leader by the Cook County Board of Commissioners in 1995, and received the Jim Noone Award for Religious Leadership from the AIDS Pastoral Care Network in 1997. The Task Force since became a resource for the entire Greek Orthodox Archdiocese of America. From 2001 to 2004 Demetrios served as board member of Chicago's Alexian Brothers' Bonaventure House, a residential care facility for people living with HIV/AIDS. In August 2005 he was honored with the Alexian Brothers AIDS Ministry 2005 President's Award.

Demetrios works for justice and humanity in the prison system. He has served as a board member and past two-term President (2003–2005) of the Illinois Coalition to Abolish the Death Penalty, and received the coalition's Cunningham-Carey Award in 2007. He has spoken and written extensively in support of abolition of the death penalty and has advocated extensively for individual death row inmates. Having met with the Illinois Governor on several occasions on the subject of capital punishment, Demetrios was invited to the ceremony where Illinois Governor Pat Quinn signed legislation abolishing the death penalty in 2011.

For all these and related activities, in 2008 he was appointed as a member of the Illinois State Advisory Committee of the United States Commission on Civil Rights. In 2011 Demetrios was re-appointed for a second term on the Committee.

Demetrios has led numerous Hellenic organizations and cultural events. He is a regular contributor of editorials in local and national media outlets for issues concerning the Greek Orthodox Faith and Hellenic culture.

He began his new ministry in St Augustine at the St Photios Shrine in October 2019.

== Publications ==
Demetrios has also contributed to numerous publications including Echoes From Calvary, Meditations on Franz Joseph Haydn's Seven Last Words of The Christ (Rowman & Littlefield Publishers, Inc, 2005), edited by Richard Young, and, The Revolution: A Field Manual for Changing Your World (Relevant Books, 2006), edited by Heather Zydek.

== See also ==
- Greek Orthodox Metropolis of Chicago
- Greek Orthodox Archdiocese of America
- Ecumenical Patriarchate of Constantinople
