= Vassa Larin =

American nun (born 1970)

Sister Vassa Larin
- Dr.

Personal details
- Born: Varvara Georgievna Larina; December 11, 1970 (age 55) Nyack, New York, United States
- Denomination: Orthodox Church of Ukraine
- Education: LMU Munich

Dr. Sr. Vassa (Barbara) Larin (born Varvara Georgievna Larina, Russian: Варва́ра Гео́ргиевна Ла́рина, pronounced [vɐrˈvarə ɡʲɪˈorɡʲɪ(j)ɪvnə ˈɫarʲɪnə]; December 11, 1970) is an American nun with the Orthodox Church of Ukraine. She is the author of many scholarly articles and a monograph on Byzantine liturgy and theology, and an outspoken public intellectual on current issues of the Russian Orthodox Church Outside Russia (ROCOR), of which she was formerly a member. She is Professor of Practical Theology of the Kyiv Orthodox Theological Academy.

Sister Vassa was a member of the Commission of the Inter-Council Presence of the Russian Orthodox Church: the Commission on Liturgy and Church Art, and the Commission of the Inter-Council Presence of the Russian Orthodox Church: the Commission on Canon Law.

== Biography ==
Varvara Georgievna Larina was born to the family of a Russian Orthodox priest in Nyack, New York. Larin graduated from Nyack High School and entered Bryn Mawr College in Bryn Mawr, Pennsylvania, at the age of 16. She left college to enter the Lesna Convent of the ROCOR in Provement, France, at age 19. After ten years in France, she spent two years at the Mount of Olives Convent in Jerusalem. Following a long spiritual and academic novitiate training, involving the study of Greek, Latin, German, Patristic Theology and Church History, Vassa was eventually enrolled by Archbishop Mark (Arndt) of Berlin and Germany to study Orthodox Theology at the Orthodox Institute of LMU Munich, Germany. There she received a master's degree in Orthodox Theology, having written a Master’s Thesis on the “Royal Office” at the beginning of Byzantine Orthros.

From 2006 to 2008, she worked as the Graduate Assistant of expert on Byzantine Liturgy, Professor Robert F. Taft, S.J., at the Pontifical Oriental Institute in Rome. Taft directed Sr. Vassa’s doctoral dissertation on the Byzantine hierarchal liturgy, which she defended summa cum laude at the Orthodox Institute of LMU Munich in December 2008. A revised version of Larin’s dissertation, titled The Byzantine Hierarchal Divine Liturgy in Arsenij Suxanov’s Proskinitarij, was published in 2010 as volume 286 of the academic series Orientalia Christiana Analecta.

Larin once taught Liturgical Studies at the Catholic Faculty of the University of Vienna in Austria.

She is a founding member of the Society of Oriental Liturgies, and a member of the North American Academy of Liturgy.

=== Coffee with Sister Vassa ===
Larin has grown an online presence with Coffee with Sister Vassa, a podcast and video series discussing catechism which she established in 2013.

=== Criticism of the Russian Orthodox Church ===
Larin has been a staunch critic of the Russia Orthodox Church's support of the Russian invasion of Ukraine. In March 2022, she called the invasion "evil", and in May signed the Volos Declaration, which declared the concept of "Russian world" as taught by the church as heresy.

On 12 May 2025 the Synod of Bishops of ROCOR issued a decree reducing Larin to layperson status, and forbidding "the former nun Vassa from wearing monastic attire...and from presenting herself in public appearances as a nun of the Russian Church Abroad." Larin has since aligned herself with the Orthodox Church of Ukraine.

== Writings ==
Her numerous publications, written in English, Russian, or German, include scholarly studies based on original manuscript-research, as well as articles on controversial topics in contemporary Orthodoxy.

=== Articles ===
- “What is Ritual Im/Purity and Why?” St. Vladimir’s Theological Quarterly 52: 3-4 (2008) 275-92.
- "The Dikerion and Trikerion of the Byzantine Pontifical Rite: Origins and Significance". Orientalia Christiana Periodica. 74: 417–430. 2008.
- “The Ecclesiastical Principle of Oikonomia and the ROCOR,” electronically published in Russian original and English translation on the ROCOR’s official website.
- "A Peculiarity in the Liturgy of St. John Chrysostom in Russia: Commemoration of Civil Authorities". Studia Liturgica. 39 (1): 15–22. 2009-03-01. doi:10.1177/003932070903900102. ISSN 0039-3207.
- "The hierarchal liturgy in late Byzantium and after: toward a liturgical ecclesiology". St. Vladimir's Theological Quarterly. 55 (1): 5. 2011. ISSN 0036-3227.
- "Roman Catholic students at Russian Orthodox liturgy: the communion of the churches, from the bottom up". Worship. 86 (4): 311. 2012. ISSN 0043-941X.
- "The Bishop as Minister of the Prothesis?: Reconsidering the Evidence in Byzantine and Muscovite Sources". Inquiries into Eastern Christian worship: 319. 2012.

=== Books ===
- The Byzantine Hierarchal Divine Liturgy in Arsenij Suxanov's Proskinitarij. Orientalia Christiana Analecta 286. Rome: Pontifical Oriental Institute. 2010. ISBN 978-88-7210-370-8.
- Praying in Time: The Hours and Days in Step with Orthodox Christian Tradition (1st ed.). Eugene: Wipf & Stock Publishers. 2023. ISBN 978-1-6667-5981-5.
