= Peter E. Gillquist =

American writer and priest

The Very Reverend Peter E. Gillquist
- Born: July 13, 1938; Minneapolis, Minnesota
- Died: July 1, 2012 (aged 73); Bloomington, Indiana
- Burial place: All Saints Orthodox Church, Bloomington, Indiana
- Education: BA Journalism; University of Minnesota

Ecclesiastical career
- Religion: Eastern Orthodox
- Church: Greek Orthodox Church of Antioch

Peter Edward Gillquist (13 July 1938 – 1 July 2012) was an American archpriest in the Antiochian Orthodox Christian Archdiocese of North America and chairman of the archdiocese's department of missions and evangelism. He was chairman of Conciliar Press (Ben Lomond, California) and the author of numerous books, including Love Is Now, The Physical Side of Being Spiritual and Becoming Orthodox. He also served as project director of the Orthodox Study Bible and, from 1997, served as the National Chaplain of the Sigma Alpha Epsilon fraternity.

Gillquist and his wife, Marilyn (married in 1960), were long-term residents of Santa Barbara, California, but, in June 2009, they moved to Bloomington, Indiana.

== Upbringing and education ==
Born in Minneapolis, Minnesota, Gillquist grew up nominally Lutheran. He attended the University of Minnesota where he received a BA degree in journalism and was active in the Sigma Alpha Epsilon fraternity. While at university, he became involved with the Campus Crusade for Christ evangelistic organization and became a born-again Christian.

Gillquist pursued graduate studies at Dallas Theological Seminary and at Wheaton College. After graduating, he became a full-time staff member of Campus Crusade for Christ in the 1960s, starting a ministry at the University of Notre Dame and ultimately becoming a regional director with the organization. After several years with Campus Crusade, Gillquist worked for three years at the University of Memphis, then for 11 years with Thomas Nelson Publishing in Nashville, where he eventually became a senior editor. In 1975, he served on the Overview Committee for Nelson's New King James Version of the Bible.

For many years, alongside Episcopal priest Fr. Robert Hedges, Gillquist served as the official co-chaplain of the Sigma Alpha Epsilon fraternity, providing spiritual guidance and pastoral care to its membership.

Gillquist was the father of six children and grandfather of 19 grandchildren.

== Spiritual journey ==
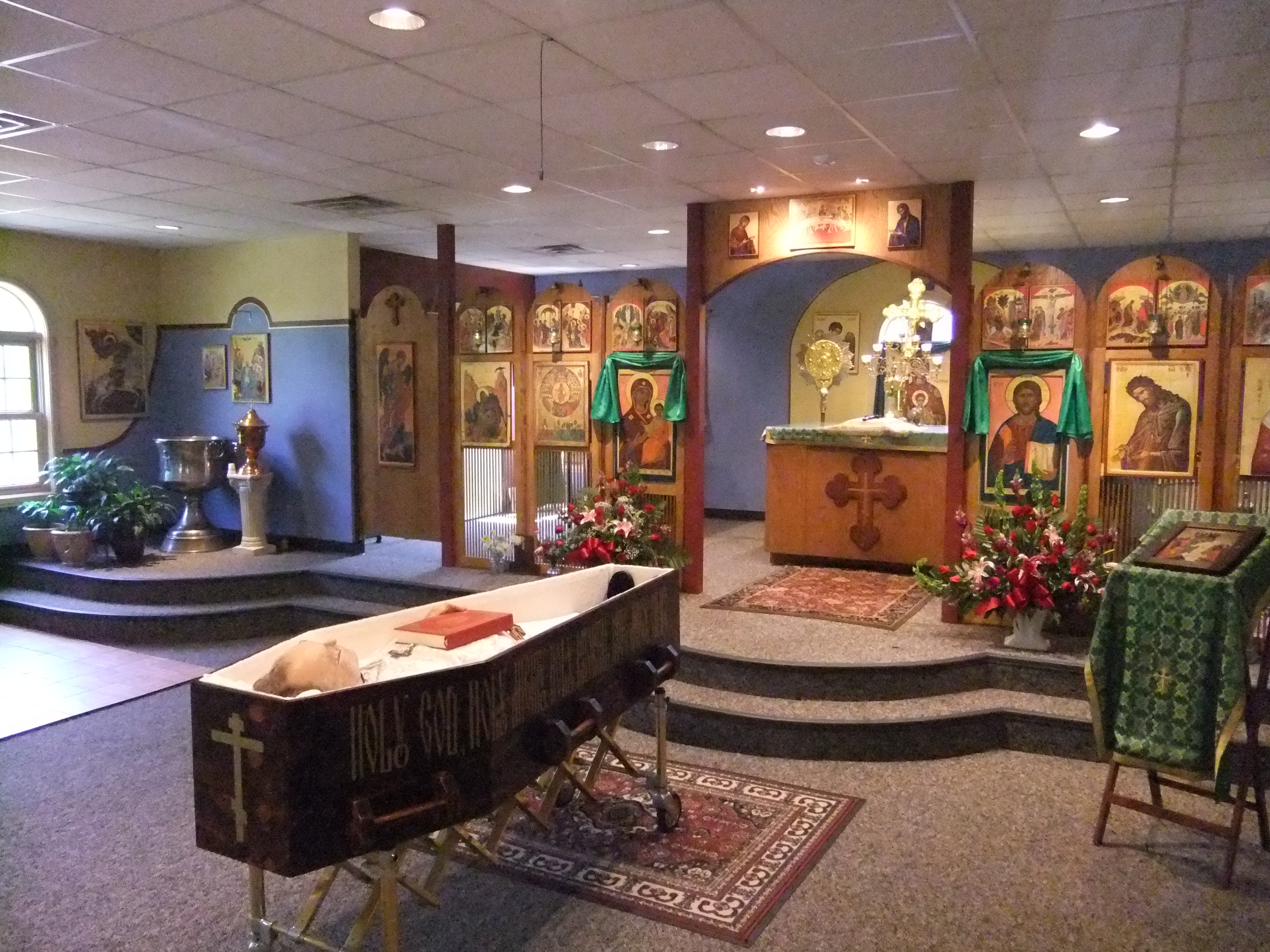
The body of Gillquist lying in state at All Saints' Orthodox Church, Bloomington, Indiana, the day before his burial

While still on staff at Campus Crusade, Gillquist and some of his colleagues began studying church history and came to the conclusion that the Orthodox Church was the only unchanged church in history. In 1973, Gillquist and his colleagues in Chicago established a network of house churches throughout the United States, aiming to restore a primitive form of Christianity, which was called the New Covenant Apostolic Order. Researching the historical basis of the Christian faith, Gillquist and his colleagues found sources for this restoration in the writings of the early Church Fathers. This led the group to practice a more liturgical form of worship than in their previous evangelical background. Originally known as the Christian World Liberation Front, and then the New Covenant Apostolic Order, in 1979 the Evangelical Orthodox Church (EOC) was organized.

A desire for apostolic succession led most members of the EOC to join the Antiochian Orthodox Christian Archdiocese of North America in 1987 after first investigating the Episcopal Church, the Roman Catholic Church, the Greek Orthodox Archdiocese of America, and the Orthodox Church in America (OCA). Gillquist and other EOC leaders traveled to Istanbul to meet with Patriarch Demetrios I of Constantinople but were unable to complete any substantial progress toward their goal. However, they were able to meet with Patriarch Ignatius IV of Antioch during his historic visit to Los Angeles that year. After further discussions, Gillquist led 17 parishes with around 2,000 members into the Antiochian archdiocese in 1987. This group became known as the Antiochian Evangelical Orthodox Mission, lasting until 1995 when its parishes were absorbed into the standard diocesan framework of the archdiocese.

On 31 December 2011, he retired as the head of the Archdiocese Department of Missions and Evangelism.

== Death ==
Gillquist died on 1 July 2012, in Bloomington, Indiana, after suffering from melanoma. After services in Bloomington and Carmel, Indiana, he was buried at the cemetery at Bloomington's All Saints' Orthodox Church, where his son, the Very Rev. Fr. Peter Jon Gillquist, serves as the priest.

== Selected works ==
- ———— (1989). Becoming Orthodox: A Journey to the Ancient Christian Faith (1st ed.). Brentwood, Tennessee: Wolgemuth & Hyatt. ISBN 978-0-9434-9767-9. LCCN 89035752. OCLC 20017237. OL 8445466M – via Internet Archive.
- ———— (1989). Foreword. Raising Them Right: A Saint's Advice on Raising Children. By Govorov, Theophan the Recluse. Translated by Rose, Seraphim. Conciliar Press. ISBN 978-0-9622-7130-4. LCCN 89061280. OCLC 26094346. OL 2223090M.
- ————, ed. (1992). Coming Home: Why Protestant Clergy Are Becoming Orthodox. Ben Lomond, California: Conciliar Press. ISBN 978-0-9622-7132-8. OCLC 26159584. OL 8518757M – via Internet Archive.
