= Frederica Mathewes-Green =

American writer

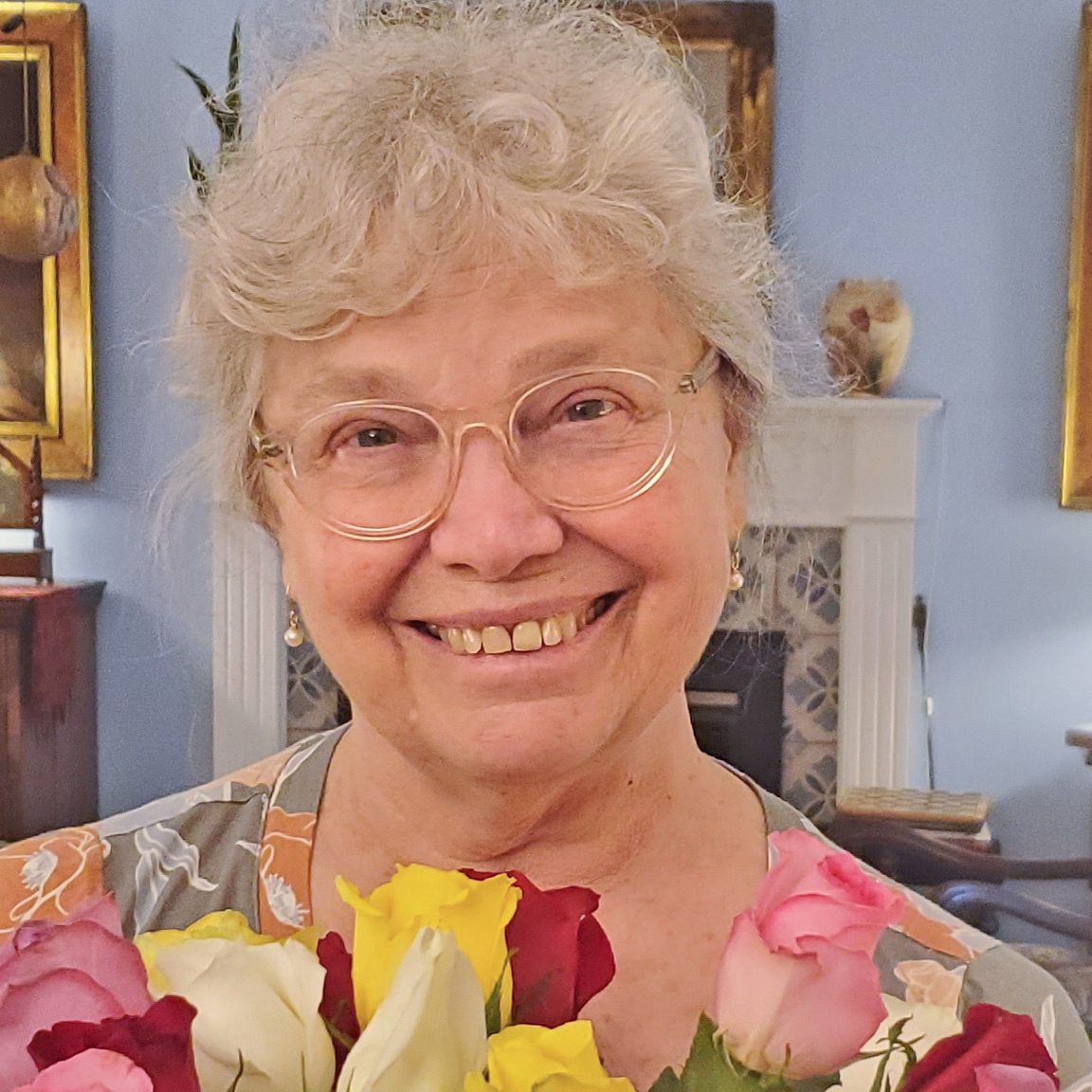
- Born: October 27, 1952 (age 73)
- Occupations: Author, speaker
- Notable work: Facing East, At the Corner of East and Now
- Website: Official website

Frederica Mathewes-Green (born October 27, 1952) is an American author and speaker, chiefly on topics related to Eastern Orthodox belief and practice.

== Career ==
Mathewes-Green earned a MTS degree from Virginia Theological Seminary in 1977 and received an honorary Doctor of Letters from King University in 2019. She and her family converted to Orthodoxy from the Episcopal Church in 1993.

Mathewes-Green's writing about Orthodoxy has been described as having a humorous, storytelling style, and she has been referred to as "an Orthodox Garrison Keillor." (Note: Dresco, John. "Book Review: At the Corner of East and Now". Orthodox Church in America Diocese of New England.) She has authored ten books, and her writings have appeared in publications including The Washington Post, Christianity Today, and The Wall Street Journal.

Mathewes-Green is active in the pro-life movement, and she served as vice-president of Feminists for Life of America. She also served on the steering committee of the Common Ground Network for Life and Choice, an organization that brought anti-abortion and pro-choice partisans together in dialogue.

== Personal life ==
Mathewes-Green is married to Fr Gregory Mathewes-Green. The couple live in Johnson City, Tennessee. They have three grown children and fifteen grandchildren.

== Books ==
- ———— (1994). Real Choices: Listening to Women, Looking for Alternatives to Abortion. Multnomah Press. ISBN 0880706783. LCCN 94037492. OCLC 31289047. OL 1111670M.
- ———— (1997). Facing East: A Pilgrim's Journey into the Mysteries of Orthodoxy. Harper San Francisco. ISBN 978-0-0606-5499-3. LCCN 96036700. OCLC 35814777. OL 7280003M – via Internet Archive.
- ———— (1999-09-13). At the Corner of East and Now: A Modern Life in Ancient Christian Orthodoxy. Tarcher. ISBN 978-0-8747-7987-5. LCCN 99029731. OL 8085631M – via Internet Archive.
- ———— (October 2001). The Illumined Heart: The Ancient Christian Path of Transformation. Paraclete Press. ISBN 978-1-5572-5286-9. LCCN 2001003627. OL 8598508M.
- ———— (2002-10-01). Gender: Men, Women, Sex and Feminism. Selected Writings. Vol. 1. Conciliar Press. ISBN 978-1-8882-1231-0. OL 8710192M.
- ———— (August 2003). The Open Door: Entering the Sanctuary of Icons and Prayer. Pocket Faith. Vol. 4. Paraclete Press. ISBN 978-1-5572-5341-5. LCCN 2003011538. OCLC 52341438. OL 8598531M.
- ———— (2005-12-30). First Fruits of Prayer: A Forty-Day Journey Through the Canon of St. Andrew. Paraclete Press. ISBN 978-1-5572-5469-6. LCCN 2005023957. OL 8598577M – via Internet Archive.
- ———— (March 2006). A Companion Guide to the Illumined Heart: The Ancient Christian Path of Transformation. Paraclete Press. ISBN 978-1-5572-5486-3. LCCN 2006285902. OCLC 69183100. OL 8598588M.
- ———— (2007). Mary as the Early Christians Knew Her: the Mother of Jesus in Three Ancient Texts. Paraclete Press. ISBN 978-1-5572-5536-5. OCLC 77821415. OL 8598621M. (originally titled The Lost Gospel of Mary)
- ———— (2009). The Jesus Prayer: The Ancient Desert Prayer that Tunes the Heart to God. Paraclete Press. ISBN 978-1-5572-5659-1. LCCN 2009025235. OCLC 318874522. OL 24573818M.
- Andreopoulos, Andreas; ———— (2011). Sign of the Cross: The Gesture, the Mystery, the History. Paraclete Press. ISBN 978-1-5572-5874-8. OL 28751143M.
- ———— (2015-04-01). Welcome to the Orthodox Church: An Introduction to Eastern Christianity. Paraclete Press. ISBN 978-1-5572-5921-9. LCCN 2014041905. OL 26857206M.
