= Patrick Henry Reardon =

Patrick Henry Reardon is an archpriest of the Antiochian Orthodox Christian Archdiocese, author, lecturer, podcaster, and senior editor of Touchstone.

Reardon began his theological education at Southern Baptist Theological Seminary in Louisville, Kentucky, then attended the Pontifical Atheneum of St. Anselm and the Pontifical Biblical Institute both in Rome, followed later at St. Tikhon's Orthodox Seminary in South Canaan, Pennsylvania.

Reardon came to national attention in 2015 when he announced he was refusing to sign any marriage licenses issued by the state of Illinois, owing to the state's complicity in the redefinition of marriage.

Reardon is a prolific writer as well as a popular pastor, homilist, and teacher. Until his retirement in 2020, he served as pastor at All Saints Antiochian Orthodox Church in Chicago. He is author of more than 500 articles, editorials, and reviews in numerous popular and scholarly journals, including more than 200 for Touchstone. He is also the author of twelve books, including works on the biblical books of Genesis, Numbers, 1-2 Chronicles, Job, Psalms, Sirach, Romans, and Revelation.

Most of his books have been published by Ancient Faith Publishing, and his podcasts are hosted by Ancient Faith Radio.

In 2024, Reardon was interviewed in Chicago at All Saints Antiochian Orthodox Church by Confessio Films. He discussed the significance of the Nicene Creed and its relevance to contemporary issues.

== Books ==
- Christ in the Psalms (Conciliar Press, 2000)
  - (Ancient Faith, 2021) ISBN 9781888212211
- Christ in His Saints (Conciliar Press, 2004) ISBN 9781888212686
- The Trial of Job: Orthodox Christian Reflections on the Book of Job (2005) ISBN 9781888212723
- Chronicles of History and Worship: Orthodox Christian Reflections on the Books of Chronicles (Ancient Faith, 2006) ISBN 9781888212839
- Creation and the Patriarchal Histories: Orthodox Reflections on the Book of Genesis (Conciliar Press, 2008) ISBN 9781888212969
- Wise Lives: Orthodox Christian Reflections on the Wisdom of Sirach (Conciliar Press, 2009) ISBN 9780982277034
- The Jesus We Missed: The Surprising Truth About the Humanity of Christ (Thomas Nelson, 2012) ISBN 9781595553713
- Reclaiming the Atonement, Volume 1: The Incarnate Word (2015)
- Revelation: A Liturgical Prophecy (St. Vladimir's Seminary Press, 2018) ISBN 9780881416374
- Romans: An Orthodox Commentary (St. Vladimir's Seminary Press, 2018) ISBN 9780881416404
- Out of Step with God: Orthodox Christian Reflections on the Book of Numbers (Ancient Faith, 2019) ISBN 9781944967666
- The History of Orthodox Christianity: Background Material For Instructors and Discussion Leaders (written to accompany a 90 minute film about the Orthodox Church)
- Bad Examples from the Bible (Ancient Faith, 2025) ISBN 9781955890854
