= Nomikos Michael Vaporis =

Greek-American historian and priest

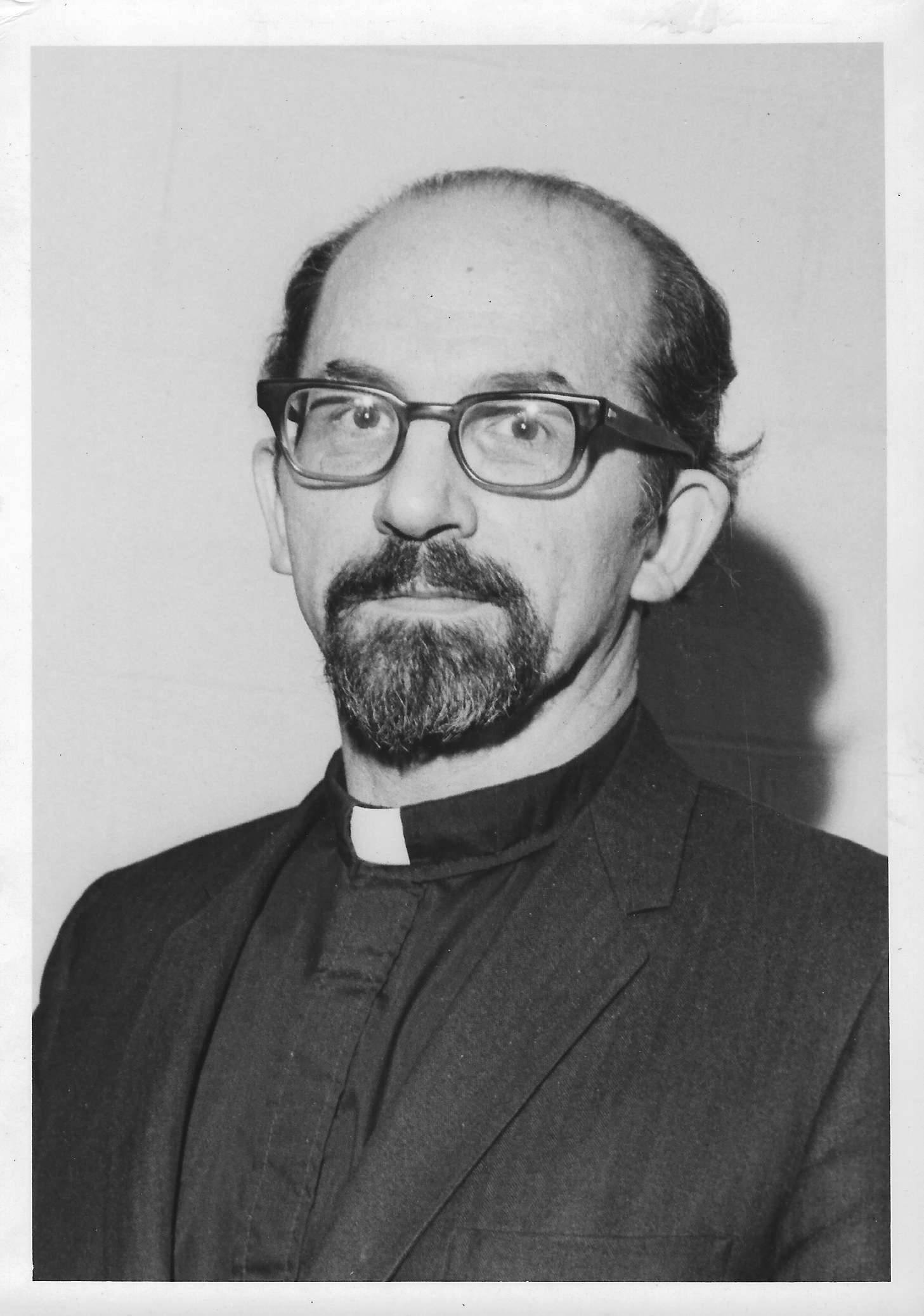
- Nomikos Michael Vaporis in 1980
- Born: 20 July 1926; Kalymnos, Greece
- Died: January 17, 1997 (aged 70); Needham, Massachusetts
- Spouse: Mary Marantis (m. 1953)

Academic background
- Education: Youngstown State College (BA); Holy Cross Greek Orthodox School of Theology (Diploma of Theology); Berkeley School of Theology (STB, STM); University of Athens (Lic.); Columbia University (MA, PhD)
- Thesis: The controversy on the translation of the Scriptures into modern Greek and its effects, 1818-1843 (1970)

Nomikos Michael Vaporis (20 July 1926 – 1997) was a Greek-American historian and Orthodox priest who taught on the Byzantine Empire and Modern Greek Hellenism at Hellenic College Holy Cross Greek Orthodox School of Theology in Brookline, Massachusetts. He also worked for interfaith dialogue, participating in peace missions, and organizing conferences and publishing academic works on the subject.

== Early life and education ==
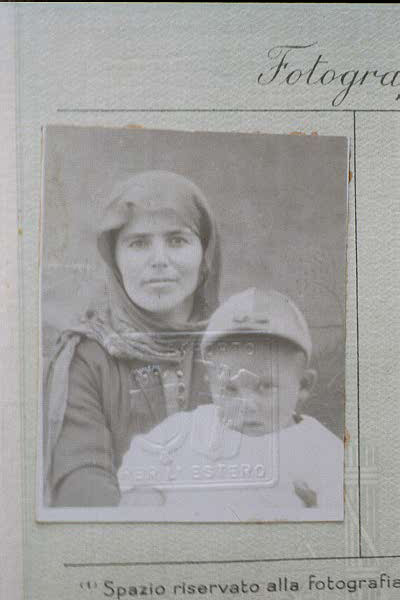
Passport photo of Nomikos Michael Vaporis (right) with mother, Kalliope Theodosiou, used for entry into the U.S. in 1929

Nomikos Michael Vaporis was born in Kalymnos, Greece, on 20 July 1926, emigrated to the United States at the age of three, and grew up in Campbell, Ohio.

Vaporis graduated from Youngstown State College with a Bachelor of Arts, and Holy Cross Orthodox School of Theology with a Diploma In Theology. He attended Berkeley Divinity School (Yale Divinity School) and received a S.T.B. and an S.T.M. At the School of Theology, University of Athens he graduated with a Greece Lic. Theology. Finally, he attended Columbia University and received an M.A., and a Ph.D. in Byzantine and Eastern European History. His dissertation research was conducted in Greece and Istanbul, Turkey (1964–1965), under the auspices of a Fulbright Award.

== Academic career ==
At Hellenic College/Holy Cross, Vaporis taught the History of the Ecumenical Patriarchate, Byzantine History, History of Modern Hellenism, History of Greece, History of the Balkans, Byzantine and Slavic Church History, and Lives of the Saints. He also served as Dean of Hellenic College (1975–1985), Acting Dean of Holy Cross (1977), Acting Dean of Hellenic College (1993) and Interim Dean, Holy Cross (1993–1995). His other positions included: Director of Holy Cross Orthodox Press (1976–1995), editor of the Greek Orthodox Theological Review (1972–1995), and founder and co-editor of the Journal of Modern Hellenism (1984–1997).

Vaporis was a member of numerous of professional organizations, including: Modern Greek Studies Association; Orthodox Theological Society of America; Byzantine Society of the U.S.A.; Byzantine Studies Conference (also as a member of the governing board), Holy Cross Alumni Association; St. Andrew's Clergymen's Brotherhood.

Vaporis worked to advance interfaith dialogue, participating in a Middle East Peace Mission to Geneva, Athens, Istanbul, Jerusalem, and Beirut organized by the Baptist Church (1973), organizing a conference on Byzantium and Islam (1980). He served on various interfaith bodies, including (Jewish) Reformed-Orthodox Consultation, Roman Catholic-Orthodox Consultation, Anglical-Orthodox Consultation, and Southern Baptist-Orthodox Consultation.

Vaporis wrote a book, Witnesses for Christ: Orthodox Christian Neomartyrs of the Ottoman Period, 1437-1860, which was published after his death. The book was the subject of a review in The Catholic Historical Review.

== Clerical career ==
He was ordained to the diaconate in March 1954 and to the priesthood in May 1954. He received the rank Protopresbyter of the Ecumenical Patriarchate in 1979.

Rev. Nomikos Michael Vaporis served the following parishes of the Greek Orthodox Archdiocese:

- Holy Cross Greek Orthodox Church, Mount Lebanon (Pittsburgh), 1954–1960
- Three Hierarchs, Brooklyn (1960–1961)
- Evangelismos, Easton, Pennsylvania (1961–1964)
- St. Athanasios, Arlington, Massachusetts (1965–1966)
- Assumption, Somersworth, New Hampshire (1967–80)
- Annunciation, Woburn, Massachusetts (Interim) (1989)
- St. George, Lynn, Massachusetts (Interim)

== Personal life and death ==
Vaporis was married to Mary Marantis, and they had four children. They married in 1953.

Vaporis died on January 17, 1997, in Needham, Massachusetts.

== Publications ==
- Some Aspects of the History of the Ecumenical Patriarchate on Constantinople in the Seventeenth and Eighteenth Centuries (The Archbishop Iakovos Library of Ecclesiastical and Historical Sources, No. 1). Brookline, MA: Holy Cross Orthodox Press, 1969.
- Codex Gamma of the Ecumenical Patriarchate (The Archbishop Iakovos Library of Ecclesiastical and Historical Sources, No. 2). Brookline, MA: Holy Cross Orthodox Press, 1976. ISBN 978-0-916586-01-0
- Father Kosmas the Apostle to the Poor (The Archbishop Iakovos Library of Ecclesiastical and Historical Sources, No. 4). Brookline MA: Holy Cross Orthodox Press, 1977.
- Codex Beta of the Ecumenical Patriarchate (The Archbishop Iakovos Library of Ecclesiastical and Historical Sources, No. 3). Brookline, MA: Holy Cross Orthodox Press, 1977. ISBN 978-0-916586-03-4
- Daily Prayers for Orthodox Christians: The Synekdemos. Brookline, MA: Holy Cross Orthodox Press, 1977. ISBN 978-0-917651-02-1
- The Divine Liturgy of St. John Chrysostom (with A. Calivas, T. Stylianopoulos, T. FitzGerald, and P. Chamberas). Brookline, MA: Holy Cross Orthodox Press, 1985: 5th printing
- The Trisagion Service. Brookline, MA: Holy Cross Orthodox Press, 1986. ISBN 978-0-917651-25-0
- The Divine Liturgy of St. Iakovos. Brookline, MA: Holy Cross Orthodox Press, 1988.
- The Order of the Divine and Holy Liturgy. Brookline, MA: Holy Cross Orthodox Press, 1987.
- The Divine Liturgy of St. Basil. Brookline, MA: Holy Cross Orthodox Press, 1988.
- A Chronicle of Hellenic College/Holy Cross. Brookline, MA: Holy Cross Orthodox Press, 1988. ISBN 978-0-917651-51-9
- The Service of the Akathist Hymn and Small Compline (with Serapheim Dedes). Brookline, MA: Holy Cross Orthodox Press, 1991. ISBN 978-0-917651-74-8
- The Service of the Sunday Orthros. Brookline, MA: Holy Cross Orthodox Press, 1991. ISBN 978-0-917651-79-3
- The Service of the Akathist Hymn and Small Compline (with Dr. Evie Holmberg). Brookline, MA: Holy Cross Orthodox Press, 1992.
- The Service of Saturday Vespers. Brookline, MA: Holy Cross Orthodox Press, 1992.
- The Services for Holy Week and Easter Sunday. Brookline, MA: Holy Cross Orthodox Press, 1993. ISBN 978-0-917651-68-7
- Translating the Scriptures into Modern Greece. Brookline, MA: Holy Cross Orthodox Press, 1994. ISBN 978-1-885652-00-3
- Witnesses for Christ. Orthodox Christian Neomartyrs of the Ottoman Period 1487-1860. St. Vladimir's Seminary Press, 2000. ISBN 978-0-881-41196-6

Other publications

Vaporis also published more than thirty articles in various journals, including: “A Defender of the Faith: Nektarios Terpos. A Case Study,” in Demetrios Constantelos (ed.), Orthodox Theology and Diakonia, pp. 145–154, Brookline, 1981; “Some Unlikely Forerunners of the Greek Revolution.” Journal of Modern Hellenism 9 (1992): 111–125.

As editor, Nomikos Michael Vaporis produced no fewer than fifteen volumes, including The Holy Gospel (Brookline, 1976), Byzantine Ecclesiastical Personalities (Brookline, 1975); An Orthodox Prayer Book (Brookline, 1977); Three Byzantine Sacred Poets (Brookline, 1979); The Apostles (Brookline 1980); The Divine Liturgy of St. John Chrysostom. Four Languages edition (Brookline, 1983); The Divine Liturgy, Episcopal edition (Brookline, 1989); A Guide to the Services (Brookline, 1988); The Holy Gospel. Complete Edition. Brookline, 1994; Christian Faith Facing Science, Education, Politics (Brookline, 1994). The Holy Gospel and The Divine Liturgy are used widely in Greek Orthodox parishes across the United States.

"Orthodox Christians and Muslims" (1986) was a particularly notable publication, the result of an interfaith conference he organized at Hellenic College/Holy Cross School of Theology in March 1985.
