= Eugen J. Pentiuc =

Romanian biblical scholar

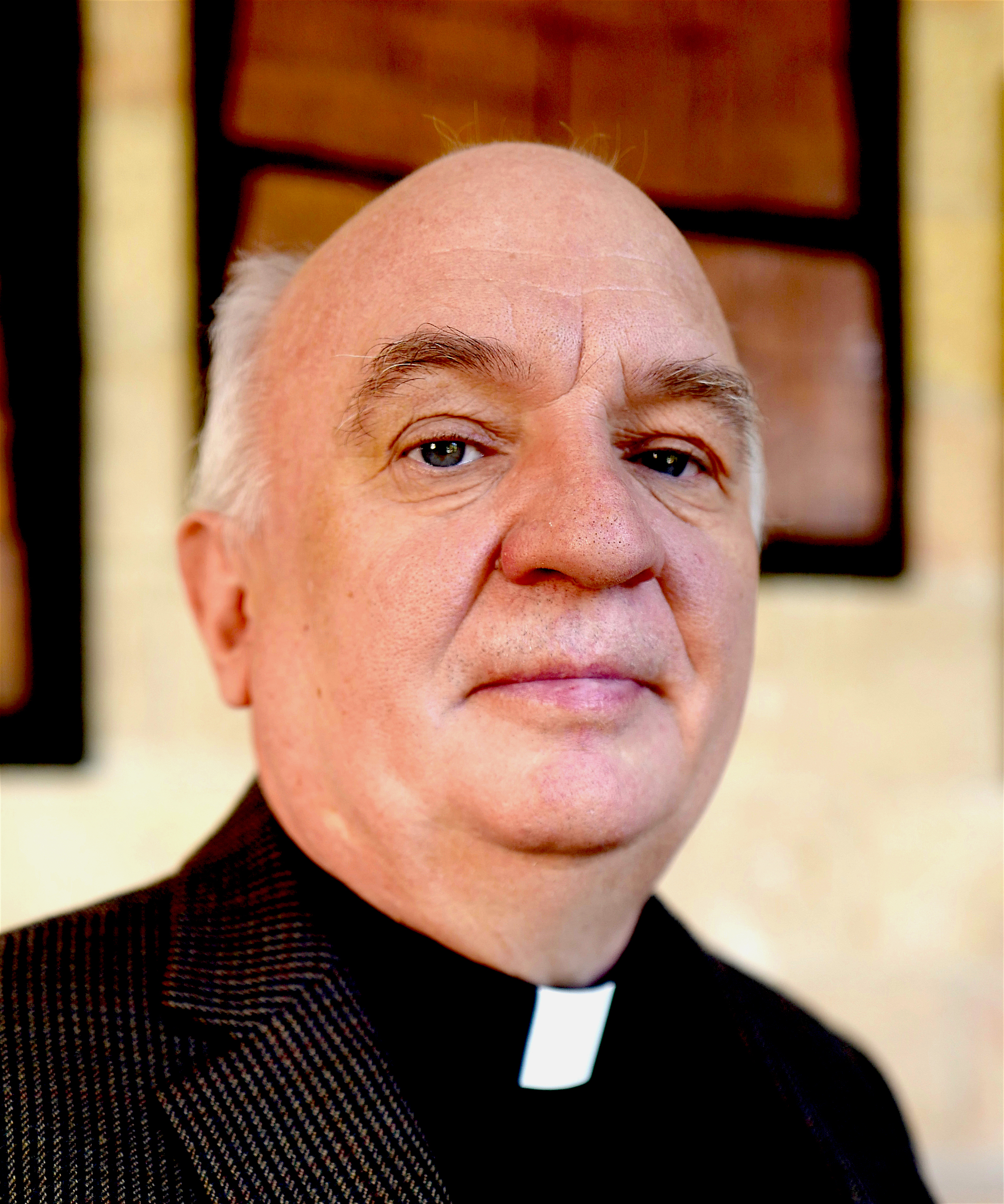
- Born: Eugen Jenică Pentiuc; 8 December 1955 (age 70); Suceava, Bukovina, Romania
- Spouse(s): Dr. Flora Pentiuc, MD Psychiatrist
- Children: Daniel Pentiuc, Cristina Pentiuc

Academic background
- Education: Doctor of Theology, Doctor of Philosophy, Doctor of Divinity
- Alma mater: Harvard University, University of Bucharest, Ecole Biblique
- Thesis: Studies in the Emar Lexicon (1997)

Academic work
- Discipline: Biblical Studies, Theology, Semitic Languages
- Institutions: Holy Cross Greek Orthodox School of Theology

Eugen Jenica Pentiuc (born on December 8, 1955) is an Orthodox biblical scholar, theologian, and Protopresbyter of the Ecumenical Throne . He serves as Archbishop Demetrios Professor of Biblical Studies and Christian Origins, Distinguished Professor of Old Testament and Semitic Languages at the Hellenic College Holy Cross Greek Orthodox School of Theology, Brookline, MA, USA, and as Dean of Holy Cross since January 1, 2024.

== Biography and Education ==
He was born in Suceava, Bukovina, Romania, and studied at the Faculty of Theological Orthodoxy of the University of Bucharest (undergraduate studies 1975–1979 and graduate studies 1979–1983).

Between 1984 and 1988, Pentiuc studied at École biblique et archéologique française de Jérusalem from which he received the academic degree Élève Titulaire de l'École biblique with the thesis Oseé XI. While at École, he does research and completes his first doctoral dissertation Cartea Profetului Osea: Traducere, introducere, si comentariu.

In April 1990, Pentiuc family came to USA and established in Southbridge, MA, where Pentiuc worked as Orthodox priest for a small Aromanian community until 2001.

In 1997, Pentiuc received a Ph.D. in Near Eastern Languages and Civilizations at Harvard University. In 1998 he obtained a Th.D. in Old Testament in the Orthodox School of Theology at the University of Bucharest. In May 2018, Pentiuc was appointed inaugural holder of Archbishop Demetrios Chair of Biblical Studies and Early Christianity. From 2019 he holds a Doctor Honoris Causa in Theology (Doctor Divinitatis) from Babeș-Bolyai University in Cluj-Napoca. Since 1998, he has been a professor of Old Testament and Semitic languages (Hebrew, Syriac) at Hellenic College Holy Cross Greek Orthodox School of Theology in Brookline, Massachusetts, USA.

Pentiuc currently lives in Boston, Massachusetts. He is married to Dr. Flora (Popescu) Pentiuc, MD Psychiatrist in Boston; they have two children, Daniel and Cristina.

== Awards and Grants ==
- 1994 Edmund J. Curley Harvard Academic Award, Harvard University.
- 1994 Protopresbyteros / Archpriest (ecclesiastic honor), Greek Orthodox Archdiocese in America.
- 1997 The Harvard Derek C. Bok Award for Excellence in Graduate Student Teaching of Undergraduates.
- 2002 Faculty Research Grant, Holy Cross (IT Lilly Endowment).
- 2003 Faculty Research Grant, Hellenic College (Office of Vocation and Ministry).
- 2005–2008 Teacher of the Year (awarded by Student Association for four consecutive years).
- 2009 Fulbright Scholar Fellowship at the University of Athens, Greece.
- 2009 Lilly Faculty Fellowship, Association of Theological Schools in America and Canada.
- 2023 Pentiuc's proposal The Scriptorium: Preaching and Teaching the Word of God in a Digital Age brought a $ 1,125 million grant to Holy Cross by Lilly Compelling Preaching Initiative.
- 2025 Pentiuc's Proposal (along with Dr. James C. Skedros, co-writer)for The Koinonia-In Communion Collaborative Large Scale Grant brought to Holy Cross $7.4M by Lilly Endowment.
- 2025 Pentiuc's Proposal for Interactive Media Center (Studio) brought to Holy Cross $1M by Lilly Endowment.

== Works ==
=== Theses ===
- Pentiuc, Eugen J. (1997). Studies in the Emar lexicon (PhD diss.). Harvard University. OCLC 42930273.
- Pentiuc Eugen J. (1998). Cartea Profetului Osea: Introducere, traducere si comentariu (ThD diss.). Bucharest University.

=== Published books ===
- Pentiuc, Eugen J. (2001). Cartea profetului Osea: Introducere, traducere si comentariu. Albatros. ISBN 973-24-0895-2
- Pentiuc, Eugen J. (2002). Long-Suffering Love: A Commentary on Hosea with Patristic Annotations. Holy Cross Press. ISBN 978-1-885652-58-4
- Pentiuc, Eugen J. (2003). Spaima de real. Cartea Romaneasca. ISBN 973-23-0240-2.
- Pentiuc, Eugen J. (2006). Jesus the Messiah in the Hebrew Bible. Paulist Press. ISBN 9780809143467.
- Pentiuc, Eugen J., General Editor (2008). The Orthodox Study Bible: Ancient Christianity Speaks to Today's World. ISBN 978-0-7180-0359-3
- Pentiuc, Eugen J. (2014). The Old Testament in Eastern Orthodox Tradition. Oxford University Press USA. ISBN 9780195331233.
- Pentiuc, Eugen J. et all. (2017) Hosea: The Word of the LORD that Happened to Hosea. Peeters Press. ISBN 978-90-429-3566-2
- Pentiuc, Eugen J. (2018). West Semitic Vocabulary in the Akkadian Texts from Emar. Harvard Semitic Studies. Vol. 49. Brill. ISBN 9789004369870.
- Pentiuc, Eugen J. (2021). Hearing the Scriptures: Liturgical Exegesis of the Old Testament in Byzantine Orthodox Hymnography. Oxford University Press USA. ISBN 978-0-19-023964-0
- Pentiuc, Eugen J., Ed. (2022). Oxford Handbook of the Bible in Orthodox Christianity. Oxford University Press USA. ISBN 978-0-19-094865-8

=== Books In Preparation ===
- Old Testament Theology: Reading the Hebrew Bible from an Orthodox Christian Perspective. Under contract with Oxford University Press USA.
- Ancient Christian Study Bible. Co-Editor-in-Chief with Paul Blowers. Under contract with Oxford University Press USA.

== Sources ==
- HCHC (n.d.). "Rev. Fr. Eugen J. Pentiuc, PhD". Hellenic College Holy Cross Greek Orthodox School of Theology.
- Fordham News (2022-10-27). "Hearing the Scriptures: A Conversation with the Rev. Eugen Pentiuc". Fordham University. The Jesuit University of New York.
- "Rev. Dr. Eugen J. Pentiuc Interviewed in Jerusalem by Trinitas TV". Hellenic College Holy Cross Greek Orthodox School of Theology. 2023-10-31.
- "Rev. Dr. Pentiuc publishes The Oxford Handbook of The Bible in Orthodox Christianity". 2022-08-17.
- Kalmoukos, Theodore (2018-06-27). "Fr. Eugen Pentiuc Appointed Archbishop Demetrios Chair of Biblical Studies at Holy Cross". Orthodox Christian Laity.
