= Evangelical Orthodox Church =

American Christian denomination, 1979–

- Type: Evangelical Christianity
- Classification: Eastern Protestant
- Orientation: Charismatic, evangelical
- Polity: Episcopal
- Bishop: Jerold Gliege
- Churches: 6
- Region: United States, Canada, parts of Africa and Sweden
- Language: English
- Liturgy: Byzantine Rite
- Headquarters: Indianapolis, Indiana, US
- Founder: Peter E. Gillquist, other unnamed former Campus Crusade for Christ members
- Origin: 1979
- Official website: www.evangelicalorthodox.org

The Evangelical Orthodox Church (EOC), founded on January 15, 1979, is an Eastern Protestant Christian denomination established by former leaders of Campus Crusade for Christ, who, reacting against the Jesus People movement, developed their own synthesis of evangelicalism, Eastern Orthodoxy, and Shepherding movement principles.

== History ==
=== Foundation ===
On January 14, 1979, the six members of the General Apostolic Council of the New Covenant Apostolic Order (NCAO)—Peter Gillquist, Jack Sparks, Jon Braun, J. R. Ballew, Gordon Walker, and Kenneth Berven—stood in a circle and self-ordained and proclaimed each other bishops. The following day they announced the formation of a new denomination—the Evangelical Orthodox Church—consisting of congregations following the NCAO. According to NCAO leaders, the EOC was launched with 2,500 members in fifty churches organized into seventeen dioceses. However, former members reported the membership as less than 1,000.

=== Controversies ===
The EOC generated controversy throughout its short history, mostly regarding its view of apostolic succession and of apostolic authority. In mainstream Eastern Orthodoxy, the hierarchy of authority is based on belief in an unbroken line of apostolic succession, from which the appointment of bishops proceeds. Jack Sparks argued that any attempt to trace such a succession inevitably included false apostles and bad men. In place of the Eastern Orthodox tradition of apostolic succession, Sparks argued for "charismatic" succession.

The EOC was itself criticized by both secular and evangelical sources for the bishops' exercise of binding authority over members. The EOC was plagued with internal problems, one notable case involving disclosure of confidential communications from a penitent in confession which was taken to civil court. In that case, the California Courts of Appeal denied the EOC leaders' legal claim to ecclesiastical privilege.

=== Dialogues ===
In 1977, the first contact with the Eastern Orthodox Church was initiated through Orthodox seminarian and former Berkeley Christian World Liberation Front member Karl "John Bartke", who introduced them to Fr. Alexander Schmemann, Dean of St. Vladimir's Orthodox Theological Seminary of the Orthodox Church in America (OCA). EOC leaders invited seminary faculty to instruct them in Orthodoxy and pursued dialogues with the OCA from 1978 to 1983, but talks broke down because of the EOC's divergent conception of church government. EOC leaders also opened dialogue with the Greek Orthodox Archdiocese of America in 1981.

In 1984 the bishops applied for the EOC's membership in the National Association of Evangelicals. Their application was tabled over concerns by members of the executive committee concerning the EOC's teachings and practices. Growing impatient with the lack of progress in dialogues with the OCA and Greek Orthodox Archdiocese of America, the EOC bishops travelled to Istanbul where they were turned away and not given an audience with the Ecumenical Patriarch of Constantinople. Orthodox sources have stated that the two primary reasons why the collective Eastern Orthodox Church was hesitant to embrace the EOC were the continued influence of Shepherding movement teachings regarding hierarchical authority and the EOC bishops' desire to remain as bishops, which was unacceptable as Eastern Orthodox bishops must be celibate and appointed by the appropriate authorities through standard procedure based on apostolic succession. It was unthinkable that any Eastern Orthodox Church patriarch would agree to these terms.

=== Disposition of parishes ===
Fr. John Bartke, who had been a member of the Christian World Liberation Front with Jack Sparks and had acted as the primary intermediary with the AOCANA, served as host for the initial set of chrismations and ordinations of the EOC at St. Michael's Church in Van Nuys, California. The group of 20 parishes became known as the Antiochian Evangelical Orthodox Mission, which subsequently issued a statement to Metropolitan Philip of the Antiochian Orthodox Christian Archdiocese of North America stating that they knew what Orthodoxy was. The Antiochian Evangelical Orthodox Mission lasted until 1995 when it was disbanded and the parishes put under the standard diocesan framework of the archdiocese.

=== Conversion to Eastern Orthodoxy ===
On September 8, 1986, the majority of the EOC became part of the Antiochian Orthodox Christian Archdiocese of North America under Metropolitan Philip Saliba. The bishops of the EOC who joined were demoted to the rank of priests—a requirement by the Antiochian Archdiocese which caused some EOC bishops to refrain from joining. According to Peter Gillquist, about three-fourths of the bishops accepted Metropolitan Philips' terms and joined, a total of 17 parishes.

Peter Gillquist said to the Los Angeles Times, "We will not be a 'church within a church.' Metropolitan Philip wants us to maintain our evangelical identity and to concentrate on evangelism and building mission churches."

== Modern-day ==
According to the EOC's official website, as of September of 2024 it consists of six churches: four in the United States, and one each in Canada and Sweden. The EOC is overseen by a synod of bishops currently consisting of: Bishop Jakob Palm (Saskatoon, Canada), Bishop Thomas Andersson (Halmstad, Sweden), Bishop Mike Quigley (Brookfield, Missouri), and Bishop Joshua Beecham, presiding (Indianapolis, Indiana). Over 200 African parishes that had belonged to the EOC were released in August of 2024 on the grounds that the EOC did not have the resources to care for them properly.

=== Views on orthodoxy ===
The official EOC website says,

- We believe that apostolic succession is primarily a matter of holding apostolic faith.
- We believe that the traceable lineage of bishops is one aspect of apostolic succession but not the exclusive condition upon which apostolic succession rests.
- We have retained our self-governing status in order to avoid being required to follow some other ethnic expression of the faith rather than an indigenous and culturally authentic one.

The EOC today is not in communion with nor recognized by any Eastern Orthodox Church.

== See also ==
- African Orthodox Church – American Christian denomination
- Duane Pederson – American Christian leader (1938–2022)
- Independent Catholicism – Religious movement
- Independent sacramental movement – Christian movement

== Sources ==
- Gillquist, Rev. Peter E. Becoming Orthodox: A Journey to the Ancient Christian Faith. Ben Lomond, CA: Conciliar Press, 1989. (ISBN 0-9622713-3-0)
