= Ancient Faith Ministries =

Orthodox Christian multimedia ministry

Ancient Faith Ministries (AFM) is a pan-Orthodox media ministry and a department of the Antiochian Orthodox Christian Archdiocese of North America. (Note: "Ancient Faith Ministries". Antiochian Orthodox Christian Archdiocese of North America.) In addition to its sales division, Ancient Faith Store, it operates several media outlets: Ancient Faith Radio (AFR), Ancient Faith Publishing (AFP), Ancient Faith Kids (AFKids), and Ancient Faith Films. It is headed by CEO Melinda Johnson.

== Overview ==
Ancient Faith Ministries is the result of a 2008 merger between two previously independently ministries: Ancient Faith Radio and Conciliar Press. Additional ministry divisions were added in subsequent years.

Conciliar Press was established in 1977 as the publishing arm of the New Covenant Apostolic Order, a group of Evangelical Christians adopting a historic, liturgical approach to Christianity. This group later became known as the Evangelical Orthodox Church (EOC). When the EOCnwas received into the Antiochian Orthodox Christian Archdiocese in 1987, Conciliar Press became part of the archdiocese.

Ancient Faith Radio was launched in 2004 by John Maddex, a former division manager of Moody Institute's 35 radio stations, while he was attending All Saints Antiochian Orthodox Church in Chicago. It began as an internet stream of Orthodox liturgical music, extending in 2005 to include podcasts, beginning with recordings of homilies by Fr. Patrick Henry Reardon, pastor of All Saints Church.

In 2008, Conciliar Press merged with Ancient Faith Radio to form Conciliar Media Ministries, which became an official department of the Antiochian Archdiocese. Due to the stronger brand recognition of “Ancient Faith,” the ministry was renamed Ancient Faith Ministries in 2013, and the publishing arm was rebranded as Ancient Faith Publishing.

Ancient Faith Blogs was launched in 2014, featuring posts from a variety of writers, many of whom are also contributors to AFR and AFP. (Note: "Ancient Faith Launches Blog Portal". Antiochian Orthodox Christian Archdiocese of North America.) Ancient Faith Films began production in 2015. In 2016, AFM launched Orthodox Christian Ebooks, a platform for the sale of e-books from multiple Orthodox publishers. (Note: "Ancient Faith Ministries Launches Orthodox Christian Ebooks". Antiochian Orthodox Christian Archdiocese of North America.)

AFM has received support from the Virginia H. Farah Foundation, a nonprofit that funds initiatives in the Orthodox Christian community (Note: "Ancient Faith Radio / Conciliar Media Ministries". Virginia H. Farah Foundation.)
