= Antiochian Orthodox Christian Archdiocese of North America =

Jurisdiction of the Greek Orthodox Church of Antioch in the US and Canada

Coordinates: 40.88409°N 73.96386°W

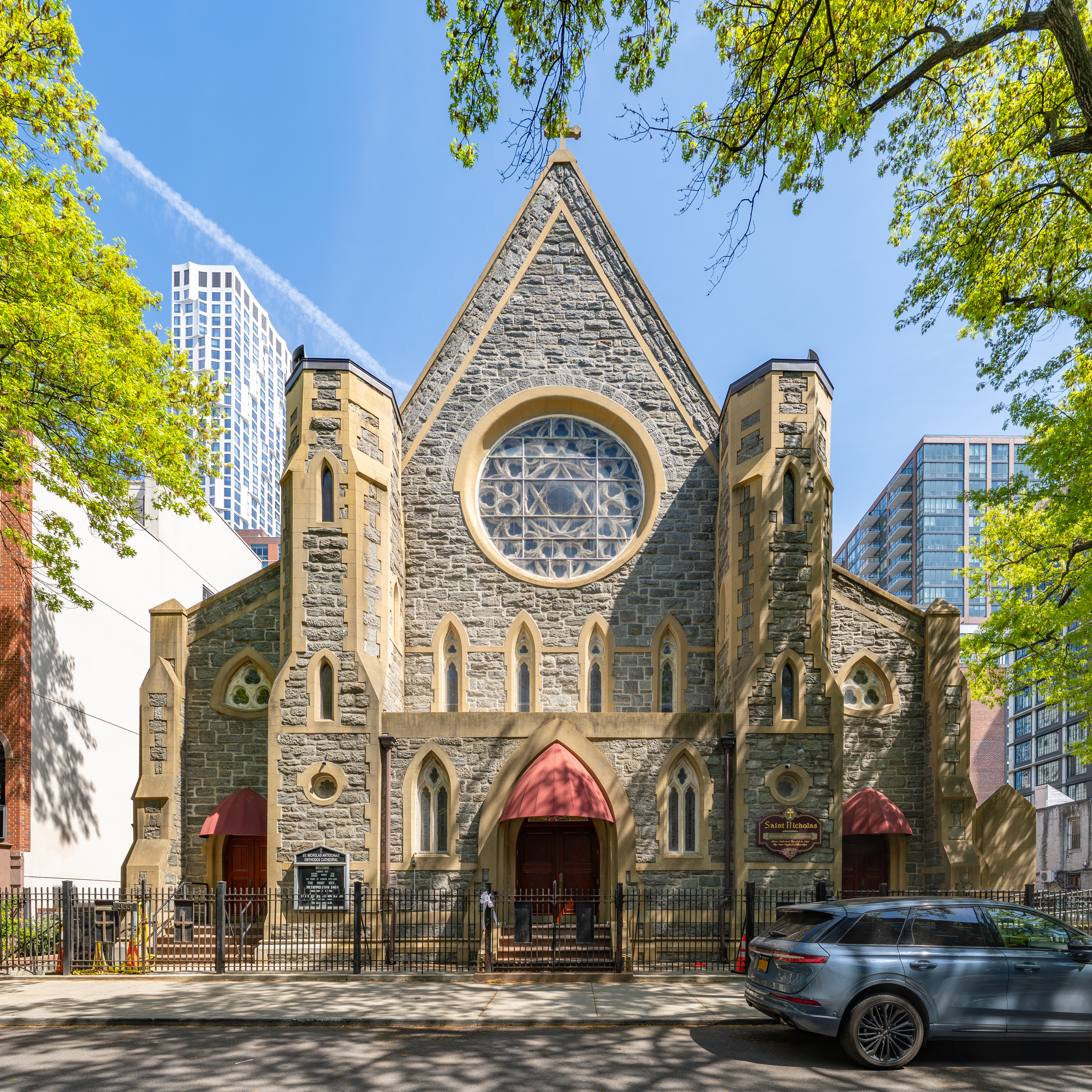
- St. Nicholas Antiochian Orthodox Cathedral, New York
- Primate: Metropolitan Saba
- Parishes: 277
- Language: English, Arabic, Greek, French
- Headquarters: Archdiocesan: 358 Mountain Road, Englewood, New Jersey; Patriarchal: Damascus, Syria
- Territory: United States and Canada
- Founder: Raphael of Brooklyn
- Origin: 1895 (Syro-Levantine Antiochian Mission); 1924 (Archdiocese)
- Recognition: Recognized by Patriarchate of Antioch as official presence in North America
- Members: 71,216 total adherents (2020), 27,897 regular attendees (2020) (United States)
- Official website: antiochian.org

Metropolitan of New York and All North America
- Archbishopric

Eastern Orthodox
- Incumbent; Metropolitan Saba since February 23, 2023

Location
- Country: United States of America
- Residence: Englewood, New Jersey

Information
- Cathedral: St. Nicholas Antiochian Orthodox Cathedral (Brooklyn)

The Antiochian Orthodox Christian Archdiocese of North America (AOCANA), often referred to in North America as simply the Antiochian Archdiocese, is the jurisdiction of the Greek Orthodox Church of Antioch in the United States and Canada. Originally under the care of the Russian Orthodox Church, the Syro-Levantine Eastern Orthodox Christian immigrants to the United States and Canada were granted their own jurisdiction under the Church of Antioch in the wake of the Bolshevik Revolution. Internal conflicts divided the Antiochian Orthodox faithful into two parallel archdioceses—those of New York and Toledo—until 1975, when Metropolitan Philip (Saliba) became the sole archbishop of the reunited Antiochian Archdiocese. The Holy Synod of Antioch granted the Archdiocese semi-autonomous status in 2003, and by 2014 it had grown to over 275 parish churches. In 2025, the Archdiocese claimed to have between 84,000 and 380,000 baptized members, "depending on the report and the counting method used." In 2015, the Archdiocese reported having around 100,000 baptized members.

It is one of two Orthodox Christian jurisdictions in North America to currently practice the liturgical Western Rite as well as the Byzantine Rite, along with the Russian Orthodox Church Outside of Russia.

== History ==
The Antiochian Orthodox followers were originally cared for by the Russian Orthodox Church in America and the first bishop consecrated in North America, Raphael of Brooklyn, was consecrated by the Russian Orthodox Church in America in 1904 to care for the Syro-Levantine Greek Orthodox Christian Ottoman immigrants to the United States and Canada, who had come chiefly from the vilayets of Adana, Aleppo, Damascus, and Beirut (the birthplace of the community's founder, Raphael of Brooklyn).

After the Bolshevik Revolution threw the Russian Orthodox Church and its faithful abroad into chaos, the Syro-Levantine Greek Orthodox Christian faithful in North America, simultaneously shaken by the death of their beloved bishop, Raphael, chose to come under the direct care of the Damascus-based Patriarchate of Antioch. Due to internal conflicts, however, the Antiochian Orthodox faithful in North America became divided between two archdioceses, those of New York City and Toledo.

In 1975, the two Antiochian Orthodox archdioceses were united as one Archdiocese of North America (now with its headquarters in Englewood, New Jersey). Since then, it has experienced significant growth through ongoing evangelization of North Americans and the immigration of Orthodox Christian Arabs from the Middle East. Its leader from 1966 until 2014 was Metropolitan Philip Saliba. Six other diocesan bishops assisted the metropolitan in caring for the archdiocese, which is the third largest Orthodox Christian jurisdiction in North America. As of 2020 it has 71,216 adherents in the United States, 27,897 of whom are regular church attendees. It also has 255 parishes in the United States with two monastic communities.

Metropolitan Philip died in 2014 and was succeeded by Metropolitan Joseph Al-Zehlaoui. Metropolitan Joseph retired in 2022 following allegations of sexual misconduct.

The archdiocese is a participating member of the Assembly of Canonical Orthodox Bishops of the United States of America. Metropolitan Joseph served as the body's first vice chairman.

== Structure ==
The archdiocese is divided in eight territorial dioceses and one vicariate. Some of the territorial dioceses extend into Canada.

- Charleston, Oakland, and the Mid-Atlantic (chancery in Charleston, West Virginia)
- Los Angeles and the West (chancery in Los Angeles, California)
- Miami and the Southeast (also referred to as DOMSE) (chancery in Coral Gables, Florida)
- New York and Washington, D.C. (chancery in Englewood, New Jersey)
- Ottawa, Eastern Canada and Upstate New York (chancery in Montreal, Canada)
- Toledo and the Midwest (chancery in Toledo, Ohio)
- Wichita and Mid-America (chancery in Wichita, Kansas)
- Worcester and New England (chancery in Worcester, Massachusetts).

Alongside the eight Byzantine Rite territorial dioceses exists the Western Rite Vicariate, a non-territorial vicariate created from remnants of the Society of Saint Basil in 1961, three years after the Western Rite was approved for use by the archdiocese in 1958. It oversees all Antiochian parishes serving the Roman or Anglican uses of the Western Rite, as opposed to the Byzantine Rite used by the majority of the archdiocese. As of 2011, there were an estimated 1,416 members of the Western Rite parishes.

== Evangelism ==
Many conservative former Anglicans have turned to the archdiocese as a jurisdiction, some joining and leading Western Rite parishes with liturgy more familiar to Western Christians. The current mission of the Antiochian Orthodox Christian Archdiocese of North America is to "bring Orthodoxy to America". Its Department of Missions and Evangelism was chaired by Peter Gillquist who led the mass conversion of the Evangelical Orthodox Church to Eastern Orthodoxy. Gillquist died in July 2012. The current chairman is John Finley.

The archdiocese also includes Ancient Faith Ministries among its departments, with its well-known Ancient Faith Radio division, an Internet-based radio station with content themed around Orthodox Christianity, including both streaming stations and more than 100 podcasts.

As a result of its evangelism and missionary work, the Antiochian Archdiocese saw significant growth between the mid-1960s and 2012. The archdiocese had only 65 parishes across the United States in the mid-1960s and, by 2011, this number had increased to 249 parishes.

=== Relations with other Christian bodies ===
The archdiocese was a member of the National Council of Churches (NCC) for decades, but its archdiocesan convention voted unanimously on 28 July 2005 to withdraw fully from that body.

== Episcopacy and Diocesan Oversight ==
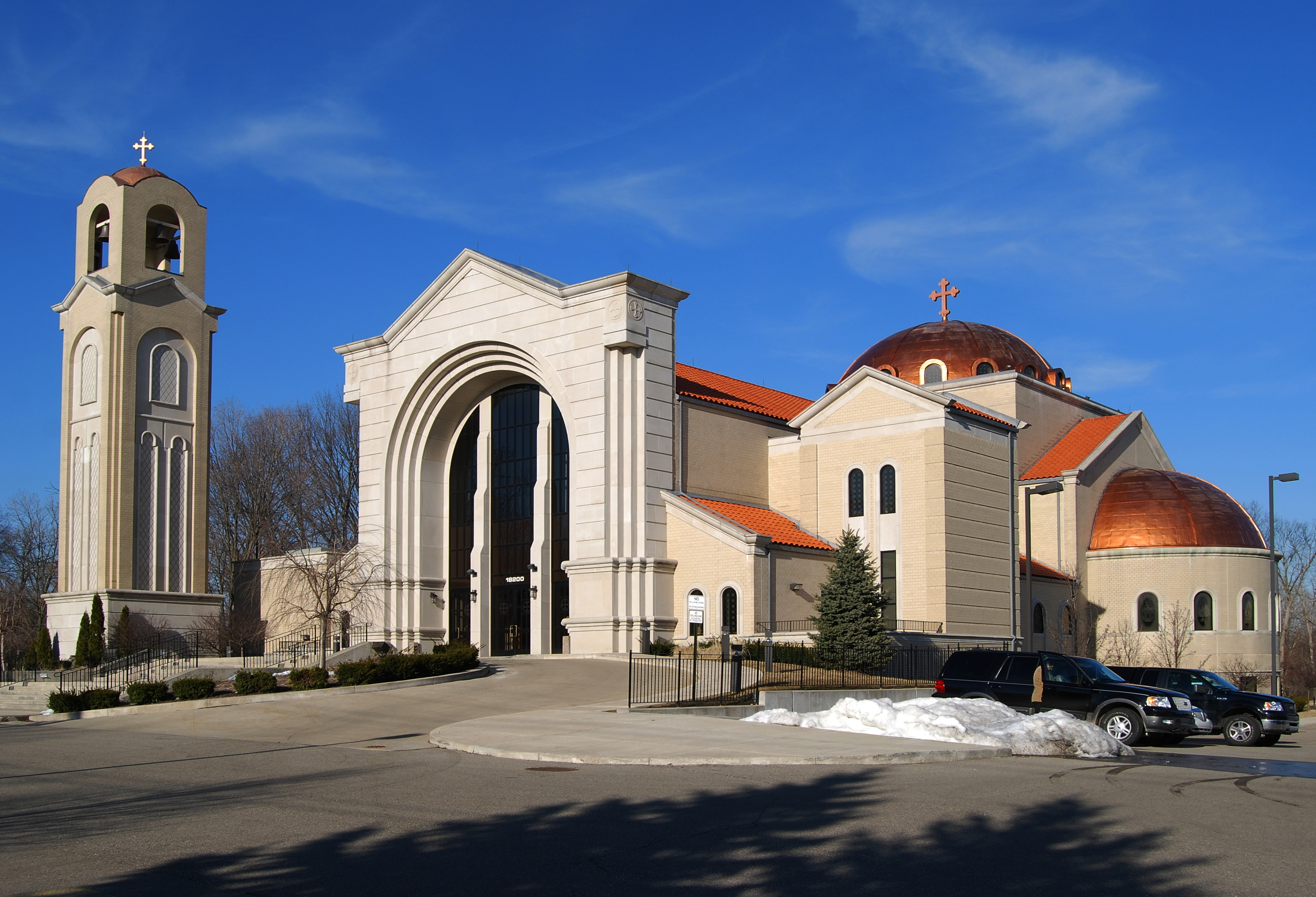
St. Mary's Antiochian Orthodox Church

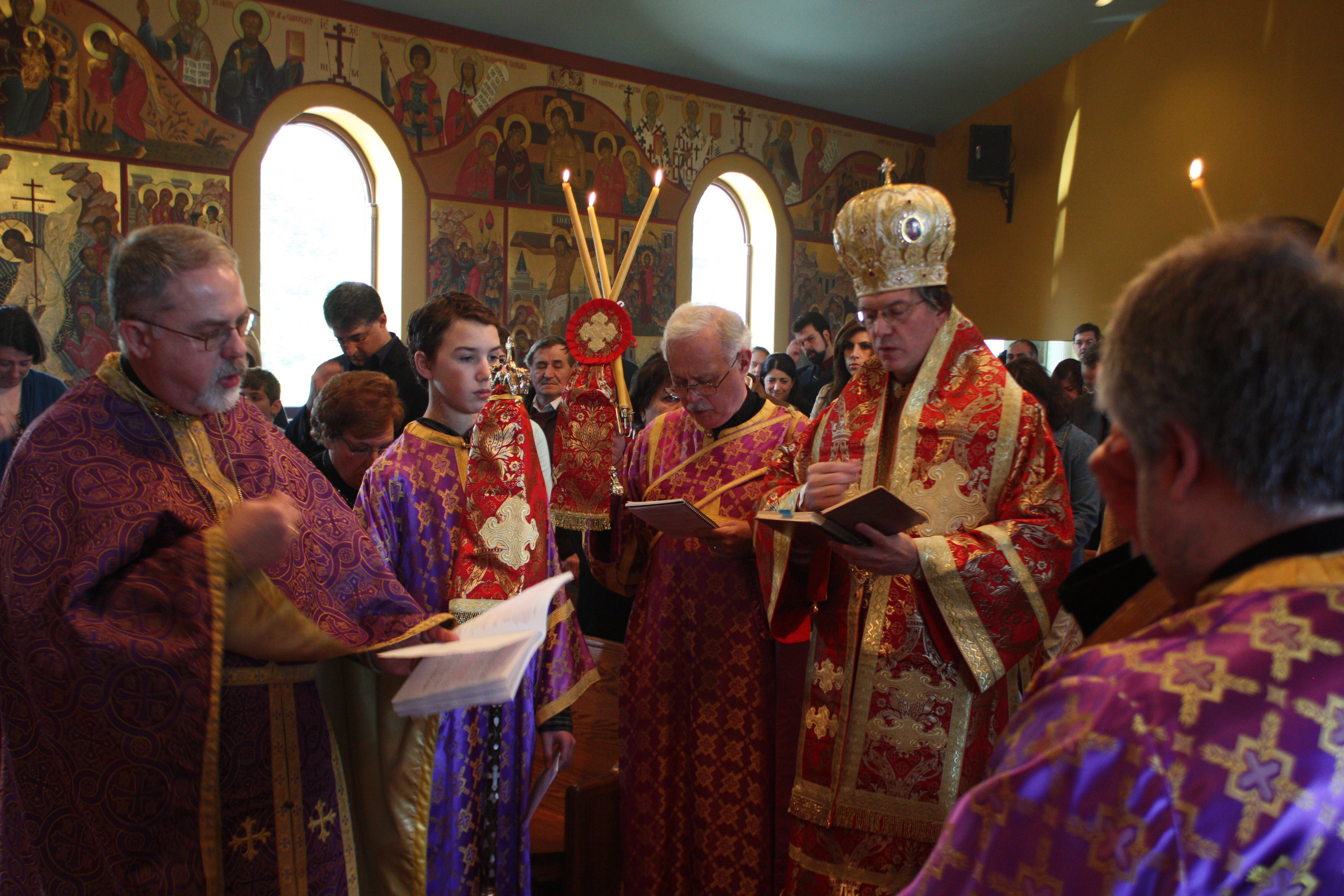
Bishop Anthony (with crown)

While American converts play a substantial role in the life of the archdiocese, being well represented among both clergy and laity, all current bishops of the Antiochian Archdiocese are of Levantine descent, though that hasn't always been the case.

In addition to the bishops, three of the dioceses are currently overseen by archimandrites on behalf of Metropolitan Saba, until the election of more bishops.

=== Metropolitan archbishop ===
- Saba Esper, Archbishop of New York and Metropolitan of the Antiochian Orthodox Christian Archdiocese of North America.

=== Auxiliary bishops and archimandrites ===
- Archimandrite Calinic Berger, Wichita Chancery
- Bishop Thomas Joseph, Charleston Chancery
- Bishop Alexander Mufarrij, Ottawa Chancery
- Bishop John Abdallah, Worcester Chancery
- Archimandrite Jeremy Davis, Toledo Chancery
- Bishop Nicholas Ozone, Miami Chancery
- Bishop Anthony Michaels, Los Angeles Chancery
- Archimandrite Paul Matar, New York Chancery

=== Former metropolitan archbishops ===
==== Archdiocese of New York ====
- Victor Abo-Assaley, 1924–1935
- Anthony Bashir, 1936–1966
- Philip Saliba, 1966–2014

==== Archdiocese of Toledo ====
- Samuel David, 1936–1958
- Michael Shaheen, 1958–1975

==== Archdiocese of New York and All North America ====
- Philip Saliba, 1975–2014
- Joseph Al-Zehlaoui, 2014–2022
- Saba Esber, since 2023

== See also ==
- Assembly of Canonical Orthodox Bishops of Canada
- Standing Conference of Orthodox Bishops in America
- Greek Orthodox Patriarchate of Antioch
- Greek Orthodox Archdiocese of America
- Antiochian Greek Christians

== Notes ==
1.The number of adherents given in the "Atlas of American Orthodox Christian Churches" is defined as "individual full members" with the addition of their children. It also includes an estimate of how many are not members but regularly participate in parish life. Regular attendees includes only those who regularly attend church and regularly participate in church life.
