= J. Stuart Russell =

British theologian

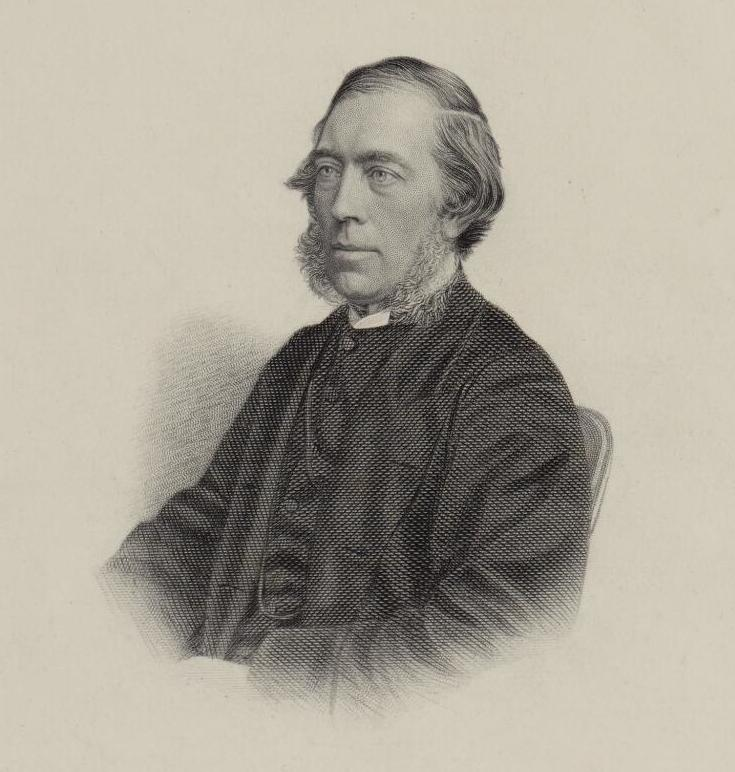
Portrait of Russell by John Cochran

James Stuart Russell M.A., D.Div., (1816 – 1895) was a Christian pastor and author of The Parousia.

The book was originally published in 1878 under title The Parousia: A Critical Inquiry into the New Testament Doctrine of Our Lord's Second Coming with a second edition published in 1887.

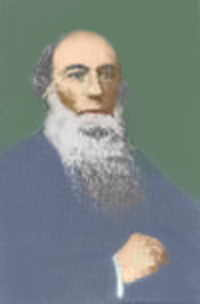
James Stuart Russell - Undated Photograph, colorized by Virgil Vaduva

== Early life and ministry ==
Russell was born in Elgin, Morayshire, Scotland, on November 28, 1816. He entered King's College, University of Aberdeen at the age of twelve and completed his M.A. degree at eighteen. Due the influence of his older brother, Russell chose to pursue Christian ministry. He served in a law office for a time before studying in the Theological Halls of Edinburgh and Glasgow, ultimately finding his way to Cheshunt College.

In June 1843, Russell became an assistant minister at the Congregationalist Church in Great Yarmouth before taking over as minister. In 1857, Russell transferred to the Congregational Church in Tottenham and Edmonton. While holding this position, Russell visited Belfast to observe the Ulster revival and came under its influence. On his return, a similar revival occurred in his own church.

After a five-year term with his second church, Russell moved to a new church in the rapidly growing suburb of Bayswater, and a new chapel was built on Lancaster Road in 1866. Russell continued to serve this church until his retirement near the end of 1888.

Russell was involved in several national campaigns. He was present at the formation of the Evangelical Alliance, in 1843 and worked with it for the remainder of his life. He was an outspoken proponent of the Temperance Movement and was the first chairman of the Congregational Total Abstinence Association. He was also a member of the National Temperance League and the United Kingdom Alliance counted him among their members.

== Publishing The Parousia ==
In 1878, Russell anonymously published The Parousia, a exegesis of myriad passages of the New Testament concerning the Second Coming or "Parousia" (a New Testament Greek word meaning "presence") of Jesus Christ. Based on his critical analysis of Scripture texts that anticipate a generation-specific, first-century Parousia (such as Matt. 16:28, 24:34; Mark 9:1, 13:30; and Luke 9:27, 21:32), Russell set forth his interpretation that Christ's Second Coming occurred in A.D. 70, when Jerusalem and the Temple were destroyed by the Romans. Russell explained: "The destruction of Jerusalem was not a mere thrilling incident in the drama of history, like the siege of Troy or the downfall of Carthage, closing a chapter in the annals of a state or a people. It was an event which has no parallel in history. It was the outward and visible sign of a great epoch in the divine government of the world. It was the close of one dispensation [the Mosaic Age] and the commencement of another. It marked the inauguration of a new order of things." (p. 546, "The Parousia," second edition [1887], reprinted by Baker Book House, Grand Rapids, Michigan [1983, 1999])

Russell's second edition, published in 1887, showed his name as the author. In his preface to this later edition, Russell commented on scholarly and public reaction to his first edition: "It was hardly expected that [his Preterist or past-fulfillment] views, which come into conflict with traditional and popular opinion, should meet with ready concurrence; but the author must confess his disappointment that no serious attempt has been made to disprove any of his positions. The work is almost wholly exegetical; and there is no attempt to invent or establish a theory, but only, by honest and faithful interpretation of the New Testament Scriptures, to allow them to speak for themselves." (p. xi, Preface to the New Edition [1887], Baker Book House edition)

In an afterword to his second edition, Russell addressed skepticism concerning one of his most provocative conclusions -- namely, that the rapture (or snatching up) of living saints, as described in 1st Thessalonians 4:15-17 and alluded to in Matthew 24:31, took place within the lifetime of Jesus' remaining faithful disciples. In response to the claim "there is no historical evidence of the fact," Russell retorted that if "the removal of a great multitude of the disciples of Christ from this earthly scene" really happened, "there should be some trace in history of this sudden disappearance of so vast a body of believers. It surely must have made a blank in history; a failure, at the least, in the continuity of the records of Christianity. ... Is there, then, any vestige in history of such a blank? Most certainly there is, and just such an indication as we might expect. A silence which is expressive." Citing several scholars who had noted a decades-long chasm in post-A.D. 70 Church history, Russell argued, in effect, that there was not an absence of evidence of a first-century rapture, but evidence of absence of the raptured disciples in the form of missing Church history. Russell wrote: "No wonder that there should be a 'total blank' in contemporary history; that there should be a solution of [the break in] continuity in the records of the Christian Church; that the pen of St. Mark should be arrested in the midst of an unfinished sentence [Mark 16:8, the authentic ending of the Gospel of Mark], that St. Luke should abruptly break off his narrative [in the Book of Acts] of the life and labors of St. Paul. Grant [by faith] that there is no failure in the predictions of Christ; that His words had a veritable accomplishment; and all is explained. There is [therefore] an adequate cause for the otherwise unaccountable hiatus which occurs in the Christian history of the time, and for the total obscuration of the [Apostolic] Church, and all its greatest luminaries." (p. 568, "The Parousia," Baker Book House edition) (

Russell specifically asserted that the Apostle John was raptured (pp. 136-138, "The Parousia," Baker Book House edition), based on his interpretation of John 20:21-23: "Jesus said to him [Peter], 'If I want him [the apostle John] to remain until I come, what is that to you? You follow me!' Therefore this saying went out among the brethren that that disciple would not die; yet Jesus did not say to him that he would not die, but only, 'If I want him to remain until I come, what is that to you?'" (New American Standard Bible 1995)

Citing 1 Corinthians 15:51 and 1 Thessalonians 4:15-17 as rapture texts, Russell wrote that the following inferences could be drawn from John 20:21-23:

1. That there was nothing incredible or absurd in the supposition that John [or other disciples] might live till the coming of the Lord [Matt. 16:28, Mark 9:1, Luke 9:27].
2. That our Lord's words suggest the probability that he [John] would actually do so.
3. That the disciples understood our Lord's answer as implying besides that John would not die at all.
4. That St. John himself gives no sign that there was anything incredible or impossible in the inference, though he does not commit himself to it.
5. That such an opinion would harmonise with our Lord's express teaching respecting the nearness and coincidence of His own coming, [which Jesus connected with] the destruction of Jerusalem [that occurred in A.D. 70], the judgment of Israel, and the close of the [Old Covenant] aeon or age.
6. That all these events, according to Christ's declarations, lay within the period of the existing generation" [Matt. 24:34, Mark 13:30, Luke 21:32].

Later, in an anonymously published pamphlet (identified as Russell's in an 1895 book titled "The Christ Has Come" by Ernest Hampden-Cook), Russell explained how the disappearance of faithful Christians could have gone unnoticed by the public in first-century Israel:

We are apt to measure things by the standard of our own time, and of our own experience, and to suppose that the same rule will apply to all times and circumstances. We naturally enough say, 'were such an event as the sudden and simultaneous disappearance of a number of prominent persons from our town, or village, or neighbourhood, to take place, what a sensation it would cause, what alarm and consternation. It would be reported all over the land, it would be the topic of conversation in every company.' Very true; but suppose all this occurred when the country [Israel] was in the occupation of a foreign army [Rome], when the invaders were marching through the land, leaving devastation and ruin everywhere in their track. Suppose the metropolis [Jerusalem] in a state of siege, captured, burnt to the ground; fire, famine and slaughter raging in every quarter; all social order convulsed amid the agonies of an expiring nation. What sensation would the disappearance of some of the members of a despised sect excite in such circumstances? Would they be missed? Or if missed, would it be thought unaccountable? Amidst the fearful signs and portents of that tremendous crisis the disappearance of the Christians might easily pass without notice.

Russell's pamphlet, titled "The Rapture of the Saints," is housed by Brigham Young University.

Russell's influential "Parousia" is written in three parts: the Parousia in the Gospels; the Parousia in the Acts of the Apostles and the Epistles; and the Parousia in the Apocalypse (Book of Revelation).

This work drew much attention to the subject on both sides of the Atlantic. The University of Aberdeen showed its appreciation of the book by conferring a Diploma in Divinity on Russell.

== Published works ==
- A Leaf from the Early History of the Ancient Congregational Church in Great Yarmouth. 1642-1670 (1850)
- Is it Possible to Restore Unity Between Evangelical Conformists and Nonconformists? A Bicentenary Lecture (1853)
- Nonconformity in the Seventeenth Century: An Historical Discourse, Delivered at the Celebration of the Bicentenary of the Congregational Church, Wattisfield, Suffolk (1854)
- The Parousia: A Critical Inquiry into the New Testament Doctrine of Our Lord’s Second Coming (1878) (published anonymously)
- The Parousia: A Critical Inquiry into the New Testament Doctrine of Our Lord’s Second Coming (1887) (published publicly)
- “Comments on the 40th anniversary of the Evangelical Alliance” (Evangelical Christendom, Vol. 41, p. 314)(1887)
- “A Rejoinder by the Author, Rev. J.S. Russell, MA” (The Congregational Review, Volume 2, Part 1, February 1888, pp. 148-151)

== Later life ==
Russell's later years were marked with ill health. During his sickness, he is quoted as having repeated the phrase, "On Christ the solid rock I stand!" His two children assisted him during his later years. He died on October 5, 1895, and was buried in the Kensal Green Cemetery.
