= Gnostic Society =

American organization studying gnosticism (1928–1974)

The Gnostic Society was founded in Los Angeles in 1928, and incorporated in 1939, by John Morgan Pryse (1863–1952) and his brother James Morgan Pryse (1859–1942) for studies of Gnosticism. Stephan A. Hoeller, author and lecturer and a leading exponent of Gnosticism, became the director of studies in 1963.

The organization ceased to exist as a legal entity in 1974. Hoeller lectured under the society's name until shortly before his death in May, 2026, presenting it as an educational organization "dedicated to advancing the study, understanding, and individual experience of Gnosis."
