= James Morgan Pryse =

American Theosophist (1849–1942)

James Morgan Pryse (14 November 1859 – 22 April 1942) was an author, publisher, and theosophist.

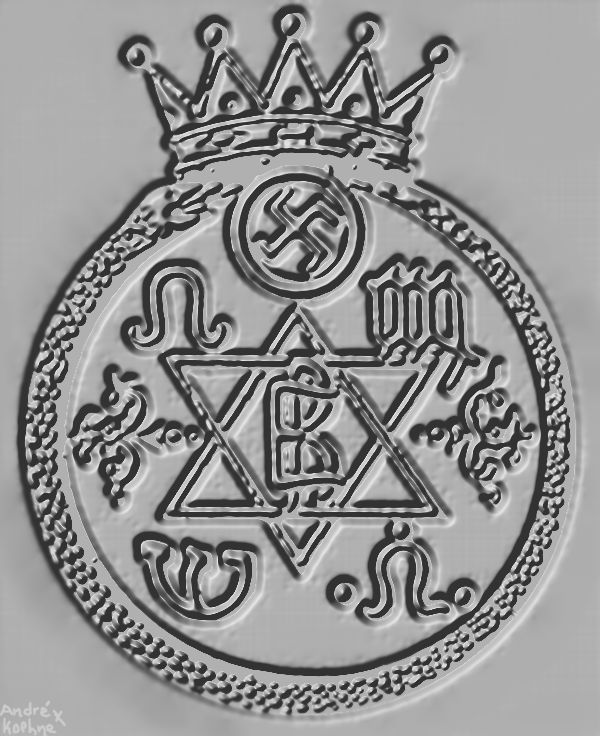
Emblem of the Theosophical Society

== Family background ==
Pryse was born in New London, Ohio (a suburb of Cincinnati), and died in Los Angeles, California.

Pryse married Jessica 'Jessie' Mayer (died on Aug. 27, 1928) on Dec. 1, 1902 at Galesville, Trempealeau County, Wisconsin.

James had a brother named John Morgan Pryse (Sept. 9, 1863 - Sept. 5, 1952) who died in Los Angeles and who was also a publisher and writer on esoteric subjects.

== Pryse brothers and the Theosophical Society ==
James settled in Los Angeles, California, in 1886. He joined the Los Angeles branch of the Theosophical Society on July 28, 1887. His brother John was already a member at that time. John later dropped out of the Theosophical Society and founded the Gnostic Society in 1928. The original headquarters of the Gnostic Society was in John's home in Los Angeles (address: 919 South Bernal Avenue, Los Angeles, California).

In July 1888 the Pryse brothers arrived in New York City. In 1889, members of the Theosophical Society from New York City and Chicago purchased a printing press and type, for the purpose of setting up a publishing company which would handle the publishing needs of the various branches of the Theosophical Society located in the United States. This theosophical publishing company, named the Aryan Press, was located at 144 Madison Avenue in Manhattan, New York City. James was recruited to set up and operate the Aryan Press, which was in full operation by December 1889.

Due to the success of the Aryan Press, a larger printing press was purchased and shipped to London, England. In August 1890, James was contacted by Helena Blavatsky, co-founder of the Theosophical Society, and summoned to London, for the purpose of setting up and operating this new publishing company, known as the H. P. B. Press (Printers to the Theosophical Society). This printing press was also referred to as the 'Blavatsky Press'. James left New York City for London in September 1890, at which time his brother John took over operation of the Aryan Press. The H. P. B. Press (Blavatsky Press) was installed in London (at 42 Henry Street, Regent's Park, London, N. W). about November 1890.

Blavatsky had asked James to publish her Esoteric Instructions in the United States, so the work would be accessible to members of the American branches of the Theosophical Society. Blavatsky's Esoteric Instructions was duly published by the Aryan Press in 1890.

In The Apocalypse Unsealed (1910) Pryse published the secret key to decoding the esoteric meaning of the Biblical Book of Revelation. His The Restored New Testament (1914) also shows esoteric meaning.

== Publications ==
- James M. Pryse - 'Credit Foncier of Sinaloa: As a Solution of the Labor Question', Credit Foncier of Sinaloa, Vol. 2, Issue 20 (1886), 8 pages.
- The Sermon on the Mount and Other Extracts from the New Testament: A Verbatim Translation from the Greek, with Notes on the Mystical or Arcane Sense (New York: Elliott B. Page & Co., 1899)
- Reincarnation in the New Testament (1900) (republished in 1904 in New York by the De Vinne Press for the Theosophical Society Publishing Department, 244 Lenox Avenue, Manhattan, New York City, New York)
- The Magical Message according to Iôannês (To kata Iőannĕn Euangelion): Commonly called the Gospel according to (St). John - A Verbatim Translation from the Greek done in Modern English, with Introductory Essays and Notes by James M. Pryse (New York: Theosophical Publishing Co. of New York, 1909)
- The Apocalypse Unsealed, being an Esoteric Interpretation of the Initiation of Iôannês (New York: J. M. Pryse, 1910)
- The Restored New Testament, the Hellenic Fragments, freed from the pseudo-Jewish Interpolations, Harmonized, and done into English Verse and Prose with Introductory Analyses, and Commentaries, giving Interpretation according to Ancient Philosophy and Psychology and New Literal Translation of the Synoptic Gospels, with Introduction and Commentaries (New York: J. M. Pryse; London: J. M. Watkins, 1914) (there is a somewhat newer book of this title that seems to be by a different author)
- The Adorers of Dionysos (Bakchai), translated from the Greek of Euripides; with an Original Interpretation of the Myth of Kadmos by James Morgan Pryse (Los Angeles: John M. Pryse; London: John M. Watkins, 1925)
- A New Presentation of the Prometheus Bound of Aischylos, wherein is set forth the Hidden Meaning of the Myth (Los Angeles: J. M. Pryse; London: John M. Watkins, 1925)
- Spiritual Light: New Scripture by Many Authors and Translations from Ancient Manuscripts, Previously Unpublished (Los Angeles: John M. Pryse, 3rd edition, 1940, 192 pages) (reprinted by Kessinger Publishing, LLC, facsimile edition, April 7, 1994, and May 23, 2010, 200 pages)
