= Herron Hill Pumping Station =

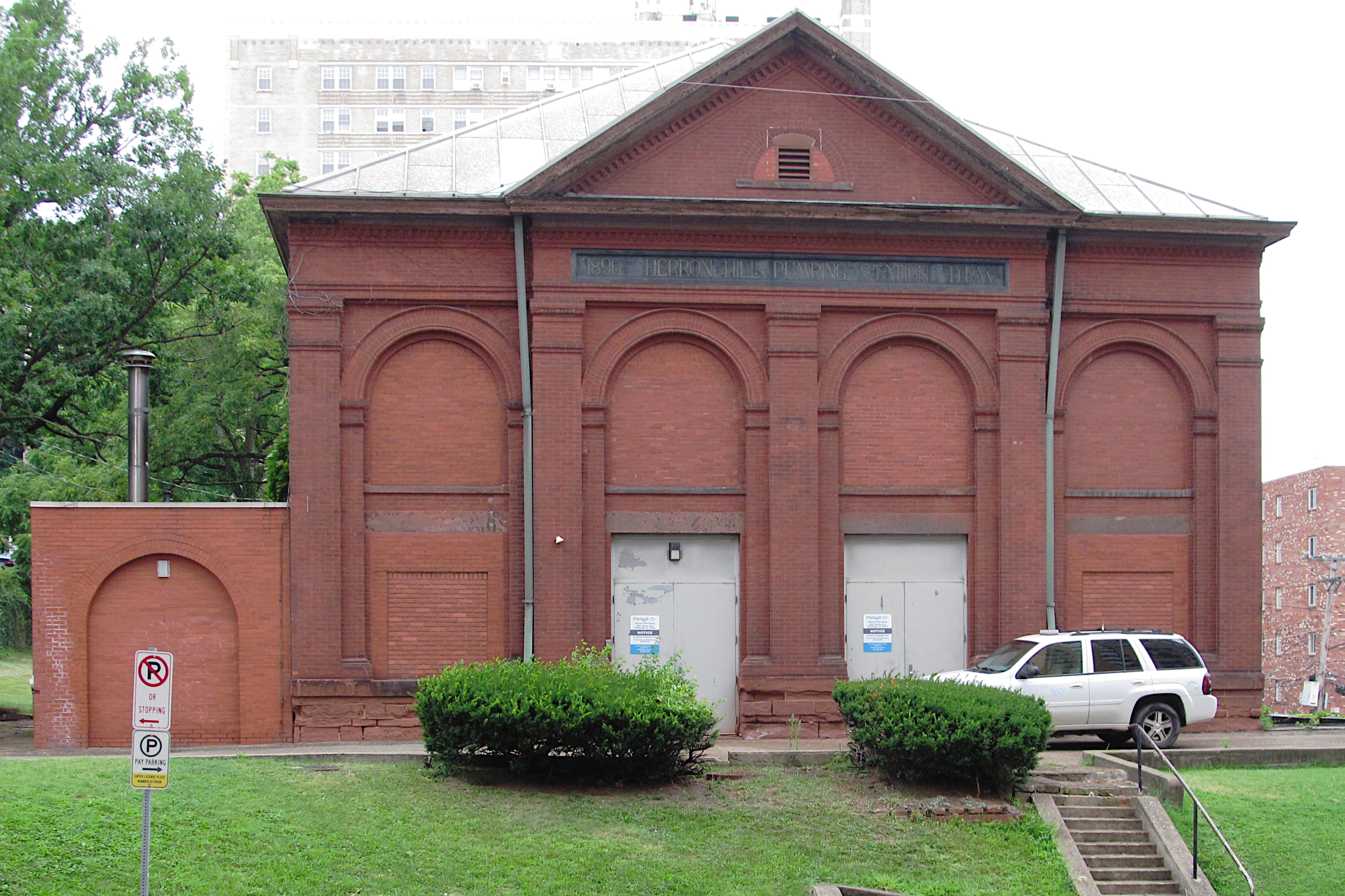
- The Herron Hill Pumping Station in 2021

- Location within Pittsburgh
- 40°27′07″N 79°57′12″W
- Location: 4501 Centre Ave., Pittsburgh, Pennsylvania, USA

History
- Built: 1896

Site notes
- Architect: William Smith Fraser
- Architectural style: Neoclassical

The Herron Hill Pumping Station is located at 4501 Centre Avenue in the North Oakland neighborhood of Pittsburgh, Pennsylvania, United States. Built in the Classical Revival architectural style, the building was instrumental in distributing water throughout Pittsburgh's East End neighborhoods, such as the Hill District and Squirrel Hill. In May 2020, Preservation Pittsburgh nominated the structure for City of Pittsburgh Historic Landmark status. In July 2020, the City of Pittsburgh's Historic Review Commission determined that the structure's nomination to be a City of Pittsburgh Historic Landmark was viable.

== History ==
After the 1872-1879 construction of Highland Reservoir No. 1 in the Highland Park neighborhood, which was created in order to meet the needs of Pittsburgh's newly annexed East End neighborhoods, Pittsburgh's City Council set aside 100 thousand dollars in 1896 for a new Herron Hill Pumping Station (out of harm's way from the landslides that had deteriorated the previous pumping station on the site). According to a Pittsburgh Press article from February 1896, the station was to have “immense pumps,” two “boilers with 200-horse-power each,” and engines that “would be among the finest used in any water plant in the world.”

Work on the station proceeded quickly, and it was likely completed by the end of 1896. With the new pumping station in place, water could be pumped from the Highland Reservoir No. 1 to the Herron Hill Reservoir or to the Bedford Basins Reservoir, both located in the Upper Hill District. Once the water reached these two reservoirs, it could then be distributed by supply mains to tanks in residential areas in the East End—a process that became known as the Herron Hill Service. The 1899 Annual Report of the Department of Public Works noted that the Herron Hill Pumping Station pumped 3,249,093 gallons of water per day to the Herron Hill Reservoir and 3,384,435 gallons of water per day to the Bedford Reservoir. The same report also stated that the total cost of pumping in 1899 was $7,393.68.

Concurrent with the construction of the Pumping Station Building, the Herron Hill Laboratory building was approved by City Council and constructed directly behind the Pumping Station building in 1897. A December 1900 issue of Popular Science Monthly stated that within the Laboratory building, “the first floor and basement are used by the Bureau of Water Supply for water analysis, tests of supplies purchased and experimental work upon the filtration of water; the second floor is used by the Bureau of Engineering as a cement laboratory...One biologist, one chemist and one attendant are employed in the water laboratory, and a chemist is employed in the department of cement testing.”

In 1909, the Laboratory Building was significantly remodeled, including the removal of the second floor. In 1918, work began to convert the pumping station's fuel source from gas to oil and to rebuild the brick foundations for the boilers. Both of these projects were completed in early 1919. Efforts to convert the Herron Hill pumps from steam to electricity was completed in 1931, and a rapid sand filtration system was put in place in the 1950s.

== Architecture ==
The Herron Hill Pumping Station was designed by William Smith Fraser, a notable late-nineteenth century Pittsburgh architect who designed many buildings in Pittsburgh, such as the National Bank of Commerce building in 1888 and the Arbuthnot-Stephenson building in 1890, both of which were considered Pittsburgh's first skyscrapers, as well as the flagship downtown department store for the Joseph Horne Company.

Fraser designed the Herron Hill Pumping Station in the Classical Revival style of architecture, elements of which are massive columns and/or pilasters with Doric, Corinthian, or Ionic capitals, a columned front porch topped with a classical pediment, and a symmetrical and formal arrangement of windows and doors. The Herron Hill Pumping Station has this formal symmetrical design as well as a front-facing gable/pediment and a dentiled cornice. The abundance of windows within the pumping station's design enabled large quantities of natural light and ventilation into the building and also allowed the public to view the infrastructure at work inside.

== Gallery ==
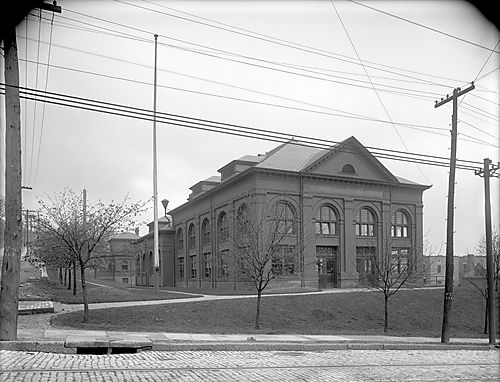
The Herron Hill Pumping Station in 1907, showing original windows and doors, hipped dormers on the roof, and a tall flag pole that stood in the west lawn.

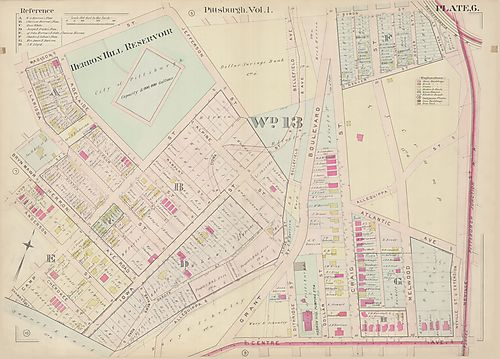
A 1904 map of the Upper Hill District and North Oakland. The Herron Hill Pumping Station is at the bottom between "Dithridge" and "Dollar" streets.

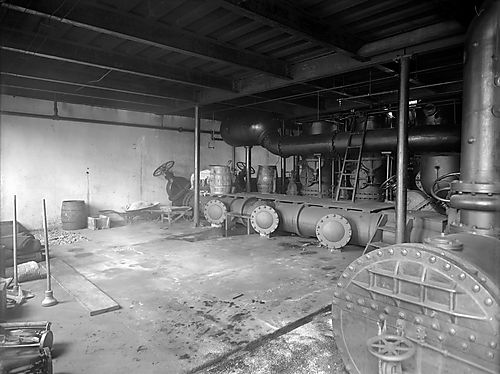
Ground floor of the Pump House, October 17, 1919, showing the water distribution pipes.

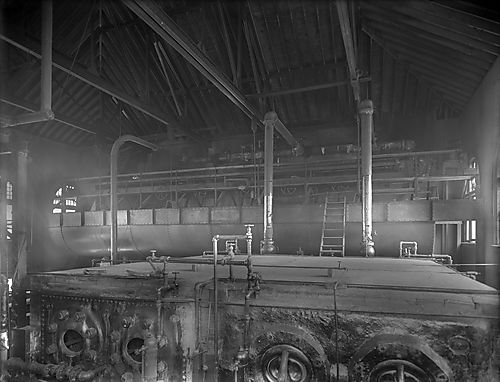
Interior of the Boiler House, October 12, 1912, looking south, showing the open double-height space and steel truss roof system above.

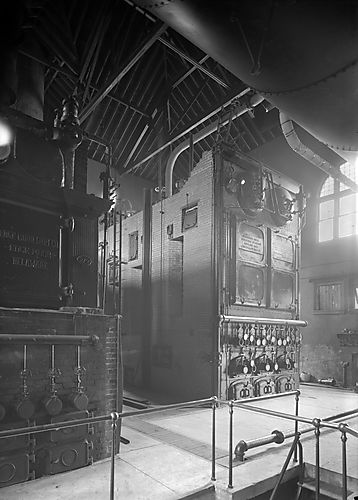
Interior of the Boiler House, December 8, 1915, looking northeast, showing Boiler No. 3 (right).The inscription on the cast iron doors of the boilers reads “Edgemoor Iron Co. — Edge Moor —Delaware."

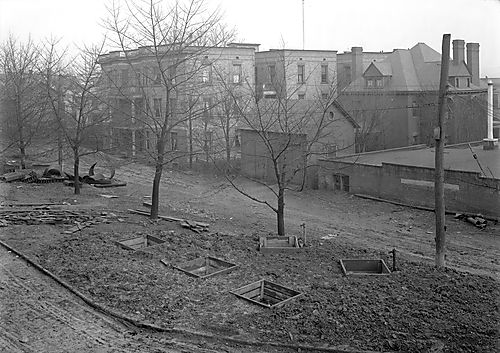
A view of Herron Hill Pumping Station in 1919, with the locations of the buried oil tanks visible.
