= William Smith Fraser =

American architect

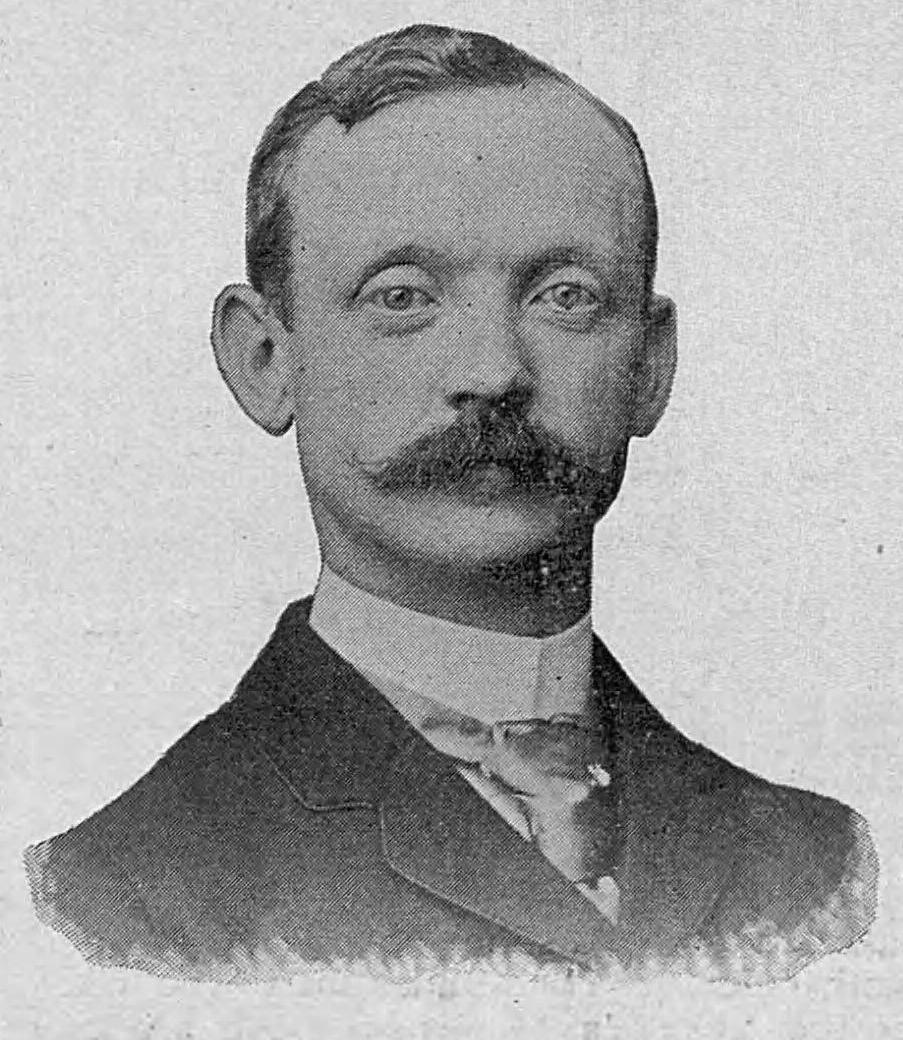
- Born: July 19, 1852; Wellsville, Ohio, U.S.
- Died: April 27, 1897 (aged 44); Pittsburgh, Pennsylvania, U.S.
- Occupation: Architect

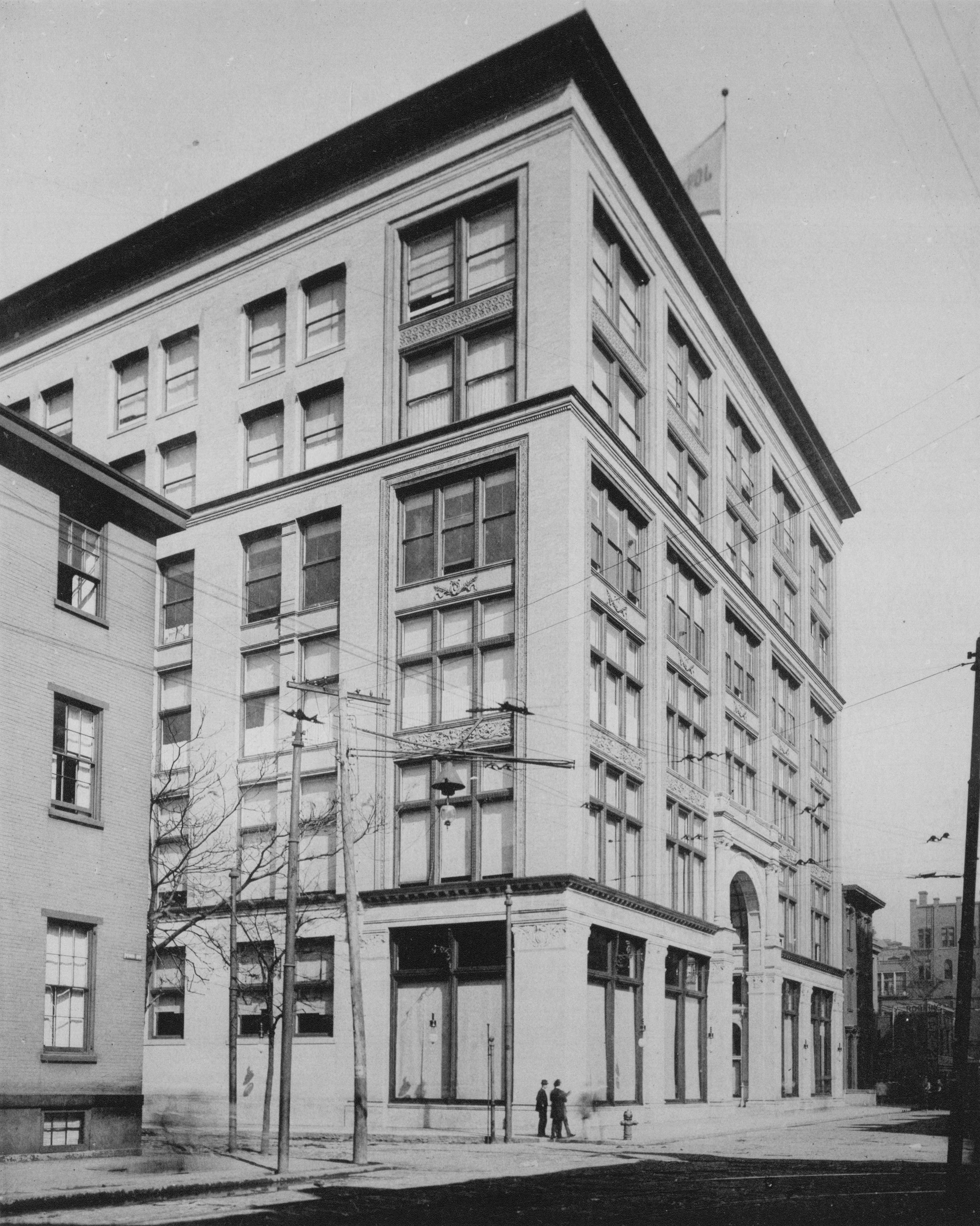
Fraser's original Joseph Horne Co. department store as it appeared in 1893

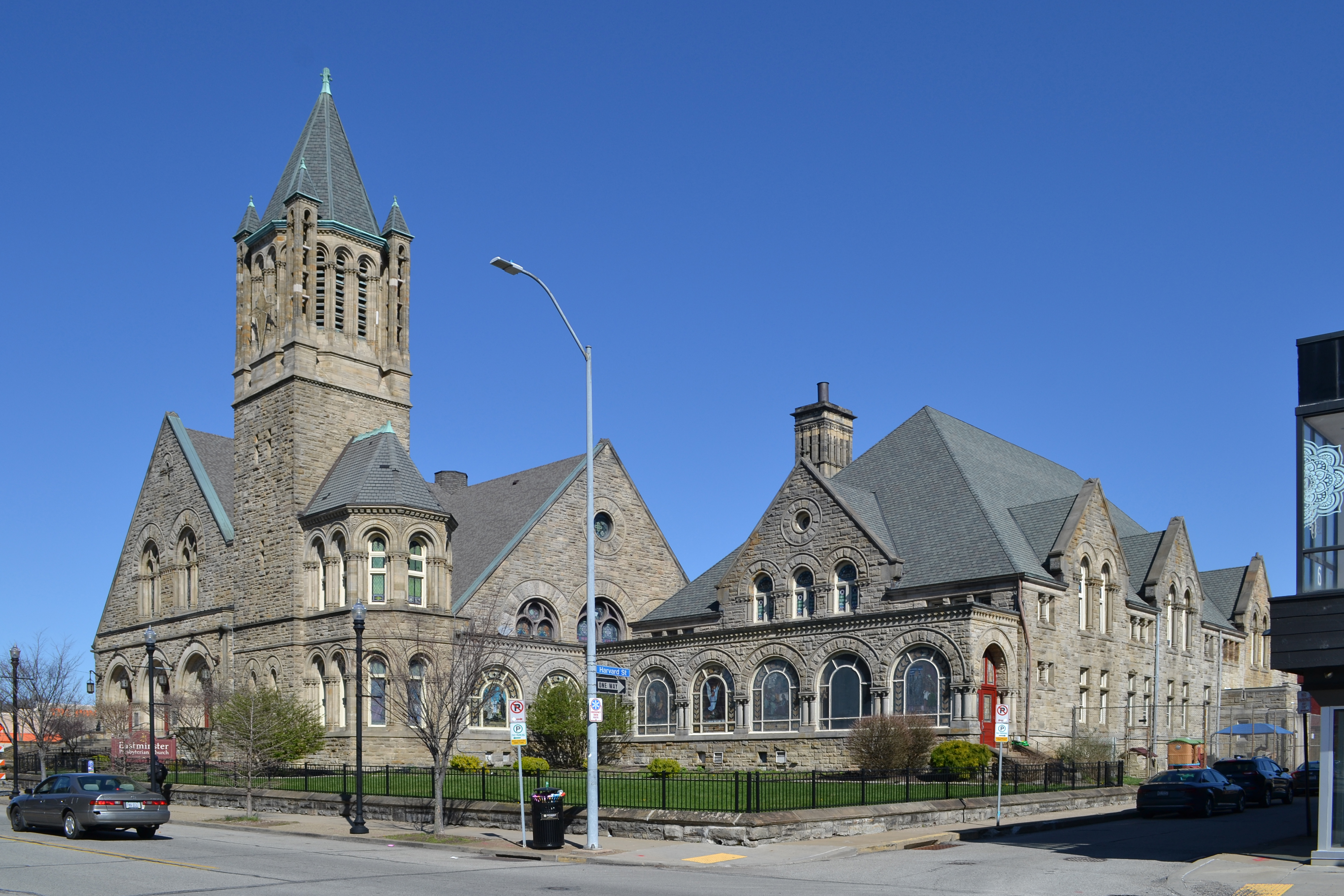
Sixth United Presbyterian Church (now Eastminster Presbyterian Church)

William Smith Fraser (July 19, 1852 – April 27, 1897) was an American architect based in Pittsburgh, Pennsylvania. Fraser is best known for his designs for the Herron Hill Pumping Station (1896), a City of Pittsburgh Historic Structure, and the original Joseph Horne Company Department Store (1893), a Pittsburgh History and Landmarks Foundation Historic Landmark, though substantially rebuilt by later architects.

Fraser was born July 19, 1852, in Wellsville, Ohio and studied architecture in New York City and in the office of William Burges in England. In 1879, he opened his architectural practice in Pittsburgh. In all, he completed about 50 commissions for homes, churches, schools, and commercial buildings, in a variety of styles, before his death from cancer in 1897. These included two of Pittsburgh's earliest skyscrapers: the National Bank of Commerce Building (1888), a steel-framed highrise completed just three years after the pioneering Home Insurance Building in Chicago (credited as the world's first skyscraper), and the Arbuthnot-Stephenson Building (1891), which was reported to be the city's tallest commercial building at 140 feet (43 m). Other major works included the Arbuckles & Co. Warehouse (1882); Sixth United Presbyterian Church (1894), now Eastminster Presbyterian Church; Horne Office Building (1894); and Lockhart Building (1895), a contributing property in the Penn–Liberty Historic District.

Fraser was an early proponent of fireproof construction, using clay tile to protect structural members in larger buildings like the National Bank of Commerce, Arbuthnot-Stephenson, and Horne buildings. In 1897, the Horne department store was one of the first fireproof buildings to experience a major fire, which became an important case study for engineers and influenced the design of future buildings. Although the steel frame survived with only moderate damage, the building was nevertheless mostly destroyed. William Harvey Birkmire, in his 1898 book The Planning and Construction of High Office-Buildings, summarized the lessons learned from the Horne fire:

"...the protection of buildings against fire does not stop with the rearing of a steel skeleton and clothing it with an integument of incombustible and non-conducting material; but includes impervious outer walls, with a minimum of window and door areas, and these protected by fire-proof shutters, frequent dividing-walls and enclosed elevator-shafts, stairways, and similar vertical openings.

Fraser died on April 27, 1897, one week before the fire and did not see his fireproof design put to the test. The store was rebuilt by the Boston-based architects Peabody and Stearns. Fraser was interred at Homewood Cemetery.

After Fraser's death, two of his draftsmen, Thomas Hannah and Fraser's nephew William F. Struthers, took over the firm, which was renamed Struthers & Hannah.

== Works ==
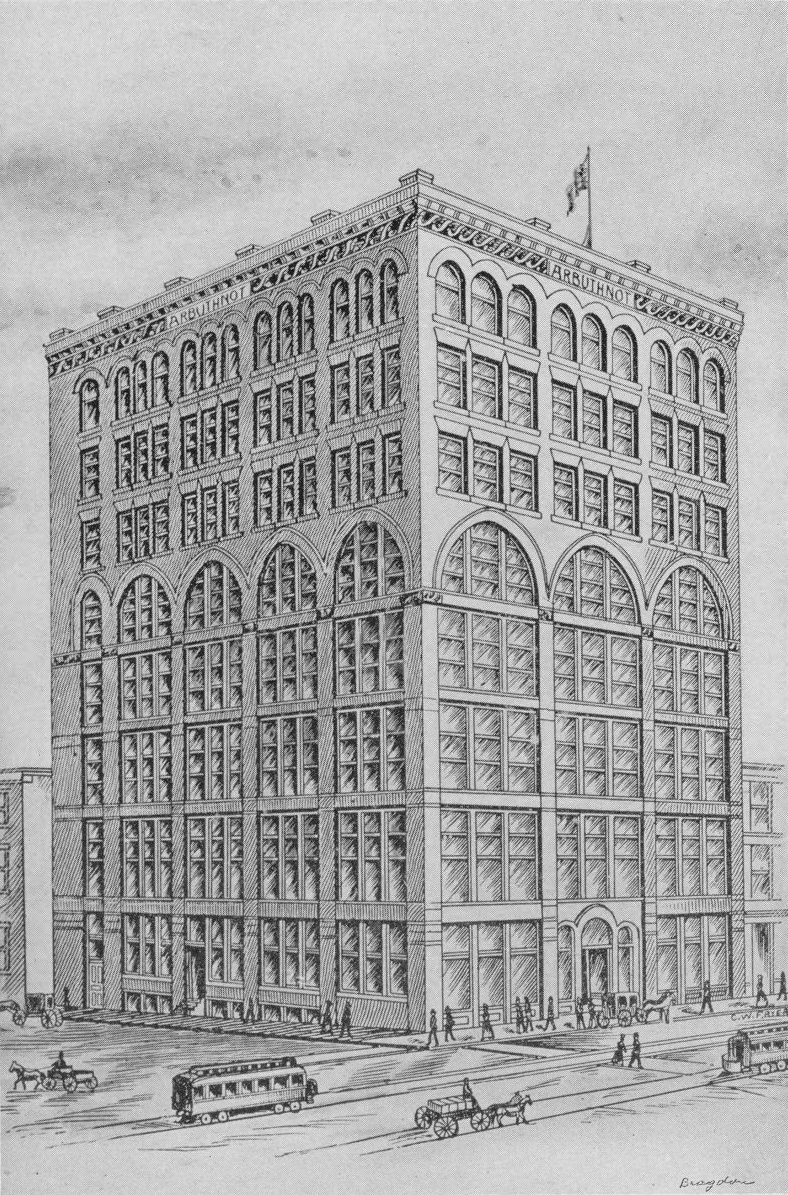
Arbuthnot–Stephenson Building (1891)

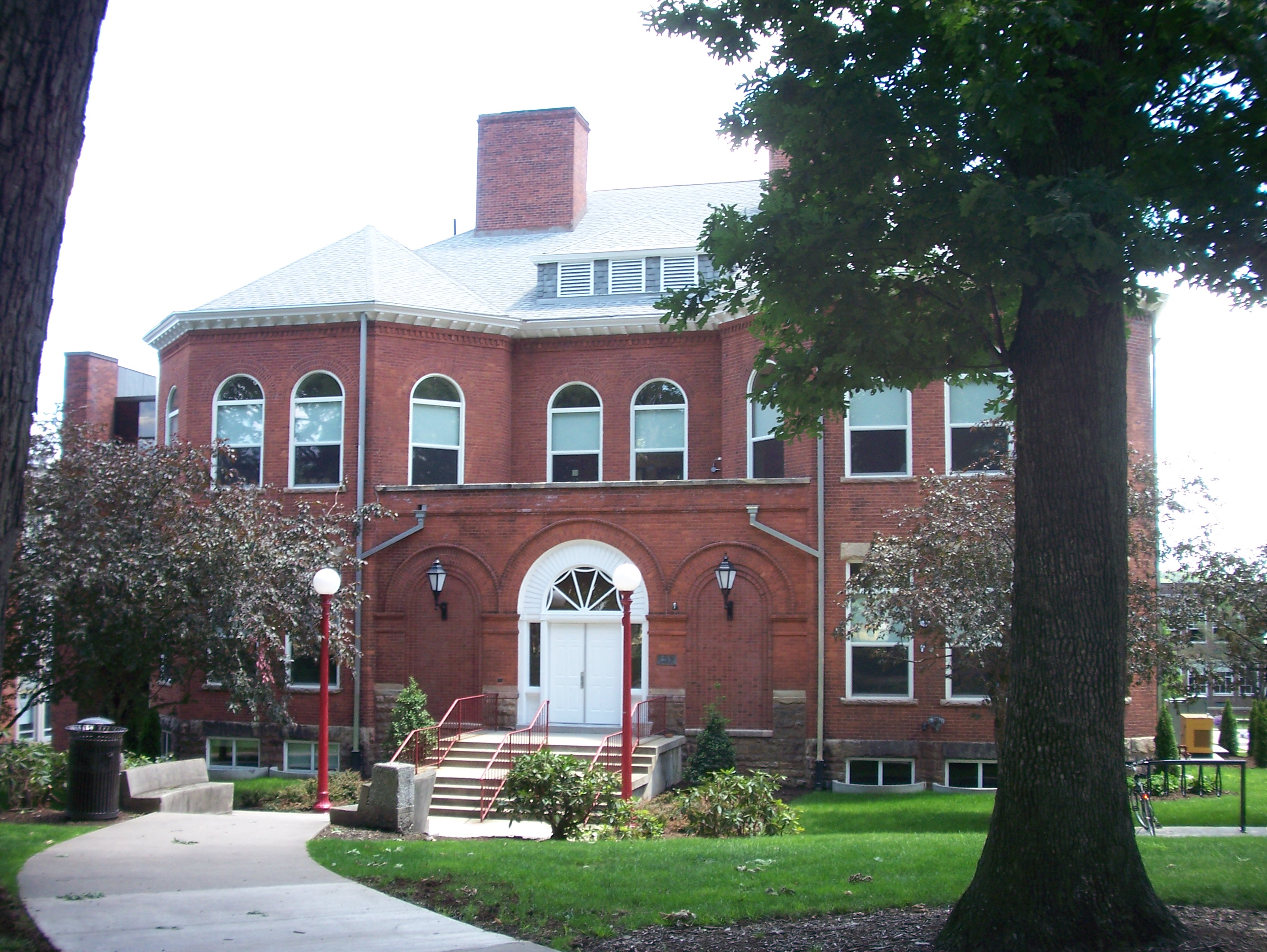
Wilson Hall (1893) at Indiana University of Pennsylvania

Fraser's more significant works include:

- Wellsville High School (1880), Wellsville, Ohio - demolished
- Arbuckles & Co. Office and Warehouse (1883), 808 Liberty Ave., Pittsburgh - demolished
- Freedman's Mission School (1884), Norfolk, Virginia - demolished
- Standard Oil Company Office Building (1884), 8th St. and Fort Duquesne Blvd., Pittsburgh - demolished
- H. L. Richmond Jr., House (1885), Meadville, Pennsylvania
- Pittsburgh Daily Post Building (1886), Wood St. and Oliver Ave., Pittsburgh - demolished
- National Bank of Commerce Building (1890), Wood St. and 6th Ave., Pittsburgh - demolished
- Houses at 512 and 518 Shady Ave. (1890), Pittsburgh
- John Renshaw House (1890), 5131 Ellsworth Ave., Pittsburgh
- Keystone Bank Building (1890), 108 4th Ave., Pittsburgh - demolished
- Arbuthnot–Stephenson Building (1891), Penn Ave. and 8th St., Pittsburgh - demolished
- W. S. Fraser House (1891), 5655 Stanton Ave., Pittsburgh
- Sharpsburg YMCA (1892), Sharpsburg, Pennsylvania - altered
- Joseph Horne Company (1893), Penn Ave. and Stanwix St., Pittsburgh - demolished
- Hamilton Avenue United Presbyterian Church (1893), Hamilton Ave. and Lang St., Pittsburgh - altered
- Wilson Hall, Indiana University of Pennsylvania (1893), Indiana, Pennsylvania
- Joseph Horne Office Building (1894), Penn Ave. and Cecil Pl., Pittsburgh
- Eastminster Presbyterian Church (1894), 250 N Highland Ave., Pittsburgh
- Lockhart Building (1895), 908–910 Penn Ave., Penn–Liberty Historic District, Pittsburgh
- Herron Hill Pumping Station (1896), 4501 Centre Ave., Pittsburgh
- Greensburg High School (1897), Greensburg, Pennsylvania - demolished
- Edward L. Dawes House (1897), New Brighton, Pennsylvania
