= Love the Coopers =

2015 American Christmas comedy-drama film by Jessie Nelson

- Theatrical release poster
- Directed by: Jessie Nelson
- Written by: Steven Rogers
- Produced by: Michael London; Jessie Nelson; Janice Williams
- Starring: Alan Arkin; John Goodman; Ed Helms; Diane Keaton; Jake Lacy; Anthony Mackie; Amanda Seyfried; June Squibb; Marisa Tomei; Olivia Wilde
- Cinematography: Elliot Davis
- Edited by: Nancy Richardson
- Music by: Nick Urata
- Production companies: Groundswell Productions; Imagine Entertainment; CBS Films
- Distributed by: Lionsgate; CBS Films
- Release dates: November 4, 2015 (Austin Film Festival); November 13, 2015 (United States)
- Running time: 107 minutes
- Country: United States
- Language: English
- Budget: $17 million
- Box office: $44.3 million

Love the Coopers (titled Christmas with the Coopers in the UK and Ireland) is a 2015 American Christmas comedy-drama film directed by Jessie Nelson and written by Steven Rogers. The film stars an ensemble cast, including Alan Arkin, John Goodman, Ed Helms, Diane Keaton, Jake Lacy, Anthony Mackie, Amanda Seyfried, June Squibb, Marisa Tomei, Timothée Chalamet, Olivia Wilde and features the voice of Steve Martin.

The plot follows an imperfect family who reunites for the holidays, as seen through the eyes of an unexpected narrator.

The film was released by Lionsgate and CBS Films on November 13, 2015. It received negative reviews from critics and grossed $44.3 million against a production budget of $17 million.

== Plot ==
Sam and Charlotte Cooper are divorcing after forty years of marriage. She convinces him to wait until after their grown children (Hank and Eleanor), grandchildren (Hank's kids Charlie, Bo and Madison), Charlotte's father and sister (Bucky and Emma) and Sam's aunt (Fishy) have enjoyed one last "perfect Christmas" before announcing the planned divorce. As scenes shift back and forth across the Cooper family members, their memories also briefly appear on screen as younger versions of themselves.

Hank, already struggling through his recent divorce from Angie, loses his job as a family holiday photographer when he is replaced by a machine. Eleanor has flown in but stays in an airport bar rather than going straight to her parents’ house. She meets Joe, a soldier snowed in for at least another day at the airport.

Talking about their different points of views and stances on relationships, Eleanor reveals that she is secretly seeing a commitment-free married man. She hates how her parents judge her for not being in a relationship. So, Eleanor convinces Joe to pretend to be her boyfriend at the family dinner.

Bucky is a regular at a local diner, where he has befriended Ruby, a 20ish waitress who is unsettled. They get into a serious argument when he learns that she is leaving town for a random spot on the map, made worse by telling others but being "too cowardly" to tell him. He then apologizes and asks her to join the family dinner.

High schooler Charlie drops in on his crush Lauren at the holiday store where she works—finally making a move and sharing a kiss with her. Emma is arrested by police officer Percy Williams after she attempts to steal a piece of jewelry as a gift for Charlotte. In his car, she engages him in conversation. He eventually relents and lets her go, with parting advice that she buy Charlotte the most expensive thing she can afford.

Sam and Charlotte continue arguing while preparing dinner. The four generations of Coopers are arriving at the house, along with Joe, Ruby, and Hank's ex-wife, Angie. Joe mistakenly says that he and Eleanor are engaged, instead of saying they are dating.

During the dinner, chaos ensues when Hank and Angie argue about their divorce. This leads to Bo screaming at them to "just stop fighting". There is a momentary power outage, and when it comes back Eleanor is kissing Joe, Emma is drinking everyone's wine, and Ruby screams when she sees that Bucky has collapsed.

At the hospital, Hank and Ruby walk beside Bucky's gurney as he is being taken for tests. She kisses Bucky on the lips – confusing but deeply touching Hank. In the waiting room, Charlotte argues with Eleanor when she figures out that she is sleeping with Bucky's physician, Dr. Morrisey. So, Eleanor crushes her further by admitting that Joe is just a prop from the airport bar whom she "invented".

Alone with a sleeping Bucky in his room, Charlotte and Emma argue about their broken relationship as sisters. Joe quietly leaves after also realizing Eleanor's affair is with Dr. Morrisey, but she chases after him after locking Dr. Morrisey in a room. Then they share another kiss.

Charlie is surprised when Lauren appears in the waiting room, responding to the text he sent her (actually, Bo sent it to "help" him). Hank comforts Ruby as part of their budding relationship. Sam and Charlotte reconcile. Emma, following Officer Percy's advice, buys Charlotte the most expensive thing she can – a shower stool from the hospital's small gift shop.

Bucky regains consciousness and walks to the hospital cafeteria, watching from a distance as everyone is happily sharing a "Christmas meal", when fortuitous muzak leads the whole Cooper clan to joyfully dance around the cafeteria. The film's narrator is then revealed to be the family's Bernese Mountain Dog, Rags.

== Cast ==
- Steve Martin (voice) as the Narrator/Rags the Dog
- Diane Keaton as Charlotte Cooper, Charlie, Madison and Bo's grandmother, Sam's wife, Eleanor and Hank's mother, Emma's sister, and Bucky's daughter
  - Quinn McColgan as Young Charlotte (12-14 Yrs)
  - Farelisse Lassor as 8-Year-old Charlotte
- John Goodman as Sam Cooper, Charlie, Madison and Bo's grandfather, Charlotte's husband, Eleanor and Hank's father, and Fishy's nephew
  - M.R. Wilson as Young Sam Cooper
- Alan Arkin as Bucky Newport, Eleanor and Hank’s grandfather, Charlotte and Emma’s father
- Ed Helms as Hank Cooper, Eleanor's brother, Charlotte and Sam's son, Bucky's grandson, and Charlie, Madison and Bo's father
  - Phillip Zack as Young Hank Cooper
- Marisa Tomei as Emma Newport, Charlotte's sister and Bucky's daughter
  - Rory Wilson as Young Emma Newport
- Amanda Seyfried as Ruby
  - Sophie Guest as Young Ruby
- Olivia Wilde as Eleanor Cooper, Hank's sister, Charlotte and Sam's daughter, and Bucky's granddaughter.
- Jake Lacy as Joe Bailey, Eleanor's love interest and a soldier
- June Squibb as Aunt Fishy, Sam's aunt
- Alex Borstein as Angie, Hank's ex-wife, and Charlie, Madison and Bo's mother.
- Anthony Mackie as Officer Percy Williams
- Alicia Valentine as June
- Blake Baumgartner as Madison Cooper, Charlotte and Sam's granddaughter, Hank and Angie's daughter and Charlie and Bo's sister
- Timothée Chalamet as Charlie Cooper, Charlotte and Sam's grandson, Hank and Angie's son and Madison and Bo's brother
- Maxwell Simkins as Bo Cooper, Charlotte and Sam's grandson, Hank and Angie's son and Madison and Charlie's brother
- Jon Tenney as Dr. Morrissey
- Dan Amboyer as Jake
- Molly Gordon as Lauren Hesselberg
- Cady Huffman as Gift shop clerk

== Production ==
Love the Coopers traces its origins to The Most Wonderful Time, a Christmas screenplay by Steven Rogers which was then picked up by Relativity Media for a film adaptation to be directed by Jessie Nelson. Diane Keaton and Robert Redford were initially cast to star in the film, which happened to also involve producer Brian Grazer and his Imagine Entertainment company. However, on July 30, 2015, Relativity themselves filed for bankruptcy, leaving the project, now named Love the Coopers, in limbo. Eventually, the film itself was acquired by CBS Films.

Principal photography began on December 19, 2014, in Pittsburgh, Pennsylvania, where scenes were filmed at Pittsburgh Crèche, at the U.S. Steel Tower, and at the PPG Place. Filming was also done on Ligonier Diamond in Ligonier. Filming took place at Butler Memorial Hospital in Butler, Pennsylvania, in January and February 2015, and at Orchard Hill Church, during the week of February the first. Filming also took place in the residential areas of Sewickley and Edgewood, at a diner in Millvale, various areas of South Fayette, Mt. Lebanon, West Mifflin, Franklin Park, Churchill and Wilkinsburg, along with the Boyce Park Slopes.

== Release ==
The film was released in the United States by CBS Films (via Lionsgate) on November 13, 2015.

=== Box office ===
Love the Coopers grossed $26.3 million in the United States and Canada, and $18 million in other territories, for a worldwide total of $44.3 million, against a budget of $17 million.

The film opened alongside The 33 and My All American, and was projected to gross $6–10 million from 2,603 theaters in its opening weekend. It grossed $2.8 million on its opening day and went on to debut to $8.3 million, finishing third at the box office behind Spectre ($33.7 million) and The Peanuts Movie ($24 million).

=== Critical response ===
On Rotten Tomatoes, the film has an approval rating of 19% based on 118 reviews. The site's critics consensus reads, "Love the Coopers has a talented cast and a uniquely bittersweet blend of holiday cheer in its better moments, but they're all let down by a script content to settle for cloying smarm." On Metacritic, the film has a weighted average score of 31 out of 100, based on 26 critics, indicating "generally unfavorable" reviews. Audiences polled by CinemaScore gave the film an average grade of "B−" on an A+ to F scale.

=== Accolades ===
Award	Category	Nominee	Result
Golden Raspberry Awards	Worst Supporting Actress	Amanda Seyfried	Nominated

== See also ==
- List of Christmas films
