= Zembillas =

Zembillas is a surname. Notable people with the surname include:

- Charles Zembillas, American character designer
- Savas Zembillas (born 1957), American church leader
