= Greek Orthodox Metropolis of Pittsburgh =

Metropolis of the Greek Orthodox Church

Metropolis of Pittsburgh
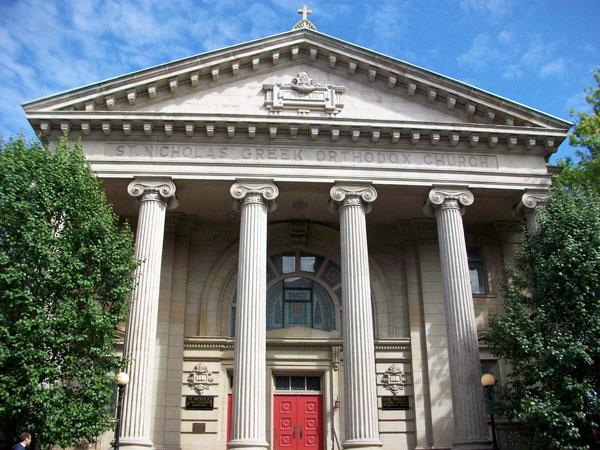

Location
- Country: United States of America
- Territory: Central & Eastern Ohio, West Virginia, and Western, Central, and Northeast Pennsylvania

Statistics
- Parishes: 51

Information
- Cathedral: Saint Nicholas Greek Orthodox Cathedral (Pittsburgh)
- Secular priests: 76 (Active + Retired)

Current leadership
- Patriarch: Ecumenical Patriarch of Constantinople
- Major Archbishop: Archbishop Elpidophoros of America
- Metropolitan: Savas (Zembillas)

Website
- https://www.pittsburgh.goarch.org//

The Greek Orthodox Metropolis of Pittsburgh is an ecclesiastical territory or metropolis of the Greek Orthodox Church in the Ohio River Valley of the United States, encompassing the state of West Virginia, and the majority of the states of Ohio and Pennsylvania, except for the Greater Philadelphia area and the Western part of Ohio.

Part of the Greek Orthodox Archdiocese of America, it is led by a metropolitan bishop who serves as the priest of the mother church, St. Nicholas Cathedral in the City of Pittsburgh.

Metropolitan Savas was enthroned as the Greek Orthodox Metropolitan Bishop of Pittsburgh on December 8, 2011, following his election to that post by the Holy Synod of the Ecumenical Patriarchate in Phanar, Constantinople, Turkey.

== Bishops/Metropolitans of Pittsburgh ==
- 1979 - 2011 - Maximos (Aghiorgoussis)
- 2011 - Present - Savas (Zembillas)

== Byzantine choir ==
In 2008, the Byzantine choir of the Greek Orthodox Metropolis of Pittsburgh traveled to Naples, Florida, where it performed in concert at the Oratory of Ave Maria University.

== Parishes ==
=== Pennsylvania ===
St. Nicholas Cathedral (Pittsburgh)
Holy Trinity Cathedral (Camp Hill)
St. Nicholas Cathedral (Bethlehem)
Holy Trinity (Pittsburgh)
Holy Cross (Mt. Lebanon)
Presentation of Christ (East Pittsburgh)
Holy Trinity (Ambridge)
Kimisis tis Theotokou (Aliquippa)
St. George (New Castle)
Evangelismos (Farrell)
Koimisis tis Theotokou (Erie)
Dormition of the Theotokos (Oakmont)
All Saints (Canonsburg)
St. Spyridon (Monessen)
St. Mary's (Johnstown)
Holy Trinity (Altoona)
Annunciation (York)
Annunciation (Lancaster)
Sts. Constantine & Helen (Reading)
Holy Cross (Stroudsburg)

=== Ohio ===
Sts. Constantine & Helen Cathedral (Cleveland Heights)
Annunciation Cathedral (Columbus)
Holy Trinity (Steubenville)
Church of The Life Giving Fountain (Martins Ferry)
Holy Trinity (Canton)
Annunciation (Cleveland)
St. Demetrios (Rocky River)
St. Paul (North Royalton)
St. Haralambos (Canton)
St. John (Boardman)
St. Nicholas (Youngstown)
St. Demetrios (Warren)
Archangel Michael (Campbell)
Annunciation (Akron)
St. Nicholas (Lorain)
St. George (Massilon)
Sts. Constantine & Helen (Mansfield)
St. James (Belpre)

=== West Virginia ===
All Saints (Weirton)

St. John the Divine (Wheeling)

Assumption (Morgantown)

Saint Spyridon (Clarksburg)

Saint John (Charleston)

Saint George (Huntington)
