= Light Up Night =

Festival in Pittsburgh

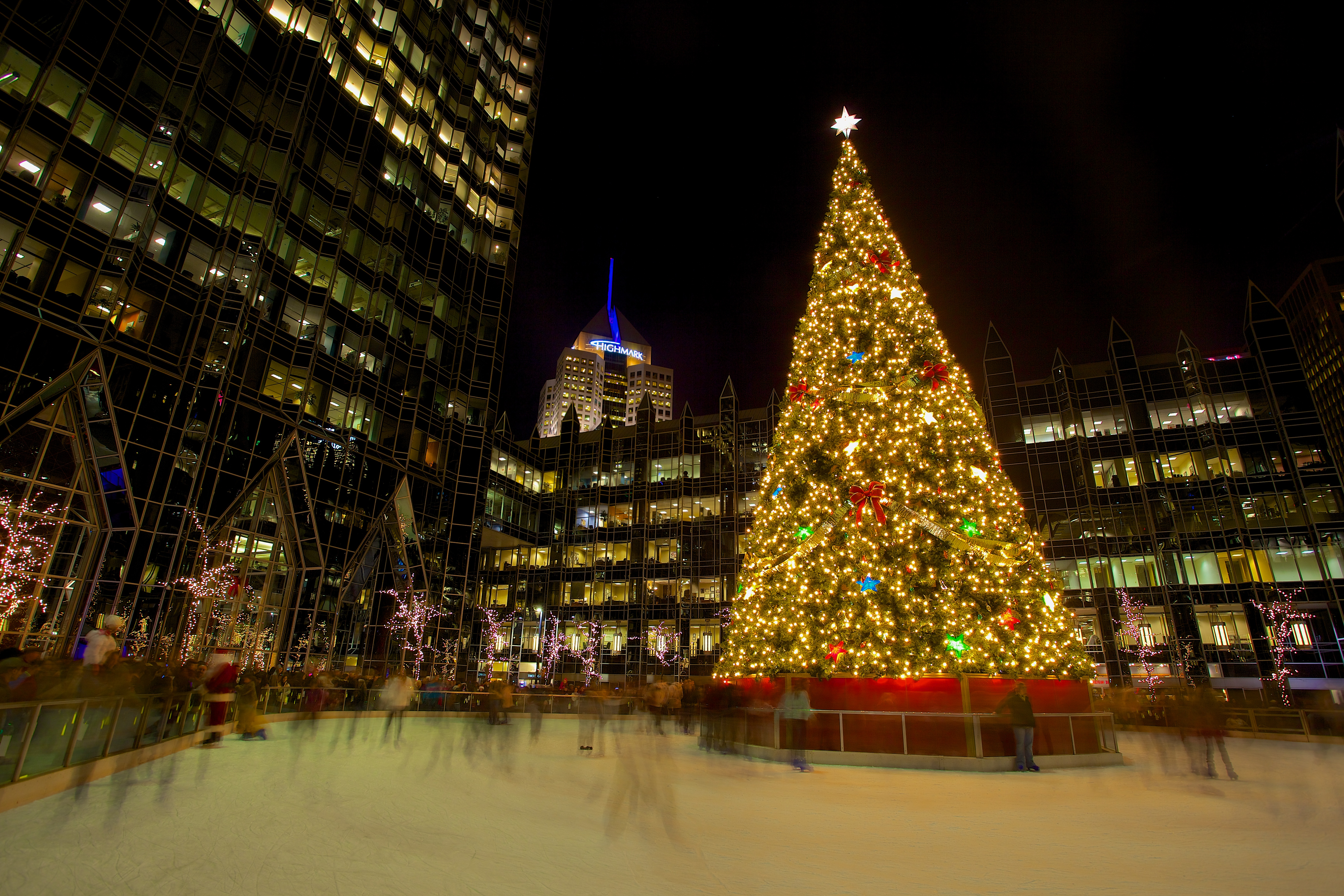
- The ice rink and Christmas tree at One PPG Place is unveiled on Light Up Night.
- Genre: Winter holiday season
- Dates: late November
- Locations: Pittsburgh, Pennsylvania
- Founded: November 21, 1960
- Attendance: over 200,000
- Website: www.downtownpittsburgh.com

Light Up Night is a family festival in the city of Pittsburgh, Pennsylvania coinciding with the unofficial start of the Christmas holiday shopping season. Many retailers in Downtown Pittsburgh remain open late, and street vendors and other concessionaires sell food and give away hot beverages, treats and promotional items. The city is decorated with Christmas lights, trees, among other holiday decorations. On Light Up Night, the skyscrapers and buildings in and around downtown keep their lights on throughout the night, lending to the name. Over 200,000 people attend the festivities.

Light Up Night is also a time for free music, including many choirs, street performers, and even rock concerts, downtown and in Station Square. In addition, the city offers free carriage rides downtown.

The event was held in November on the Friday before Thanksgiving until 2019, then on the Saturday before Thanksgiving from 2021.

With the increasing popularity of the event, The Pittsburgh Downtown Partnership has threatened to sue other communities and organizations that fail to pay a licensing fee for trademark infringement.

== Traditions ==
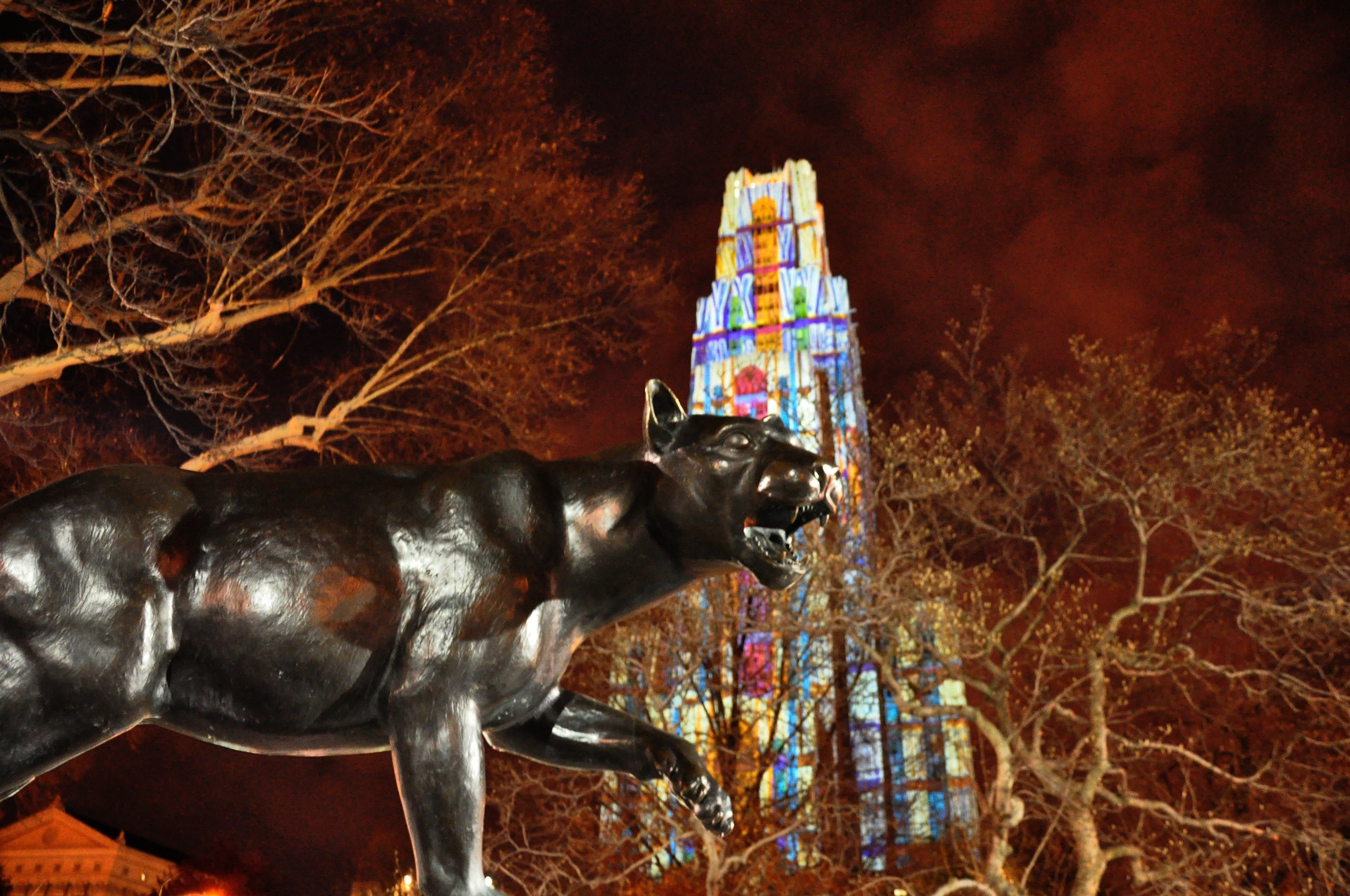
The University of Pittsburgh's Cathedral of Learning illuminated for Light Up Night.

=== Lightings ===
The lighting of the Christmas tree in the ice skating rink in PPG Place is an annual tradition. When the lights are turned on, the ice skating rink officially opens to the public for the season. At 9,600 square feet (890 m^{2}), the surface is over 2,000 square feet (190 m^{2}) larger than the famous rink in New York's Rockefeller Center. Each year, the Wintergarden inside PPG Place features a model train, gingerbread houses, and a collection of life-sized Santa Claus figures in traditional dress representing countries around the world.

The lighting of the electric tree on the corner of the old Horne's department store is an old tradition which continues to this day. A pyrotechnics show accompanies the lighting. Trees throughout the city are also lit with ceremony, including the Unity Tree at Penn Avenue Plaza.

=== Pittsburgh Crèche ===
The Pittsburgh Crèche is a large-scale nativity scene located on the outside courtyard of the U.S. Steel Tower. Since 1999, the crèche appears annually during the winter season from Light Up Night to Epiphany in January. It is the only authorized replica of the nativity scene in Saint Peter’s Basilica in Rome.

Many performers and mascots frequent the streets downtown, posing for pictures with children, or giving away treats. In recent years, the Kings Family Restaurants Frownie Brownie mascot has made his rounds with samples.

=== Other events ===
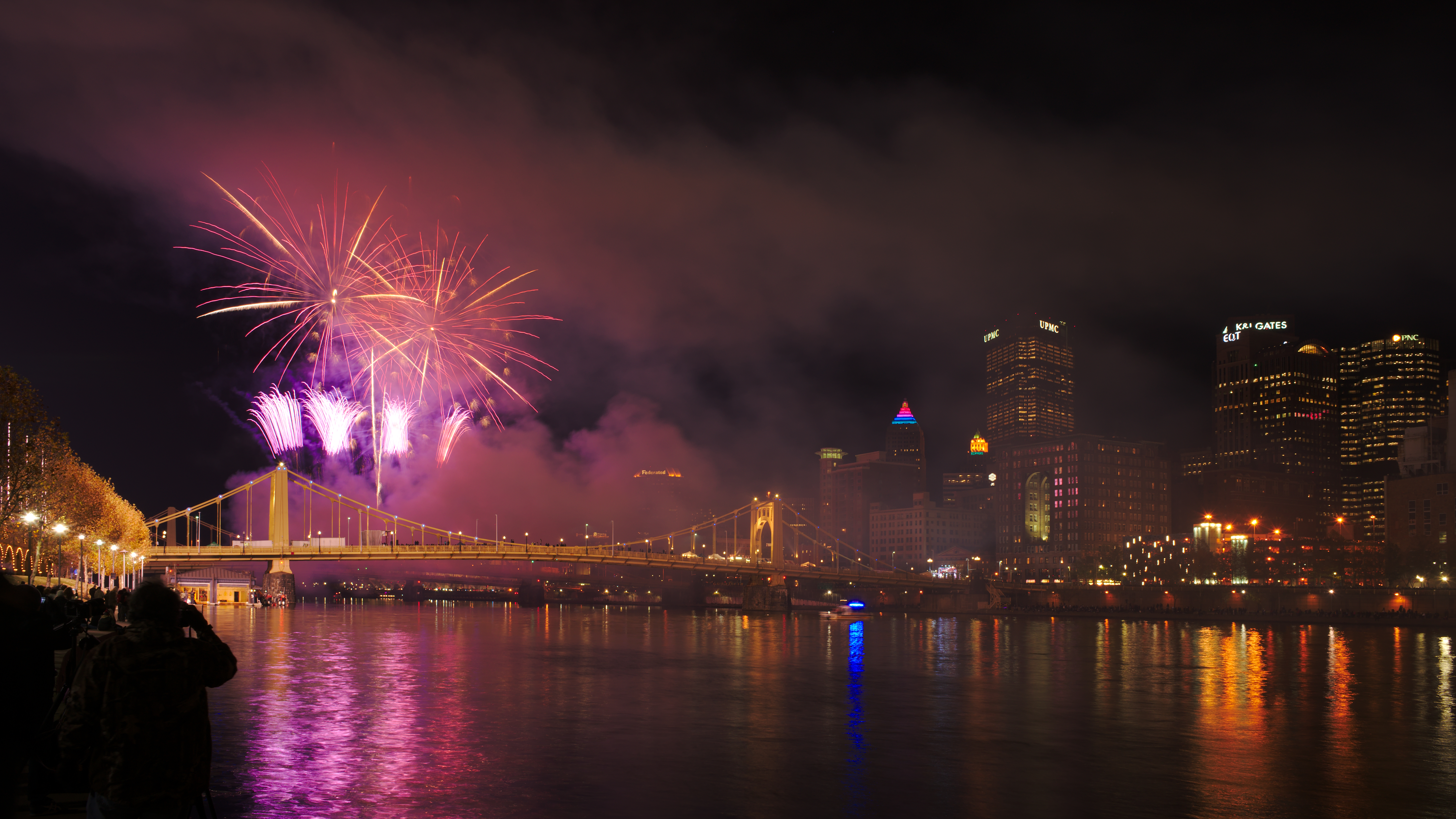
Fireworks at Light Up Night 2015.

- Macy's display window: Macy's department store, in the old Kaufmann's building, continued the tradition of its former tenant by revealing its Christmas display in the windows along Smithfield Street before its 2015 closure. The windows in the display's latter years took their theme from the story of Virginia O'Hanlon's editorial to the New York Sun, asking if there is a Santa Claus.
- Market Square: Market Square is filled with booths offering toys, giveaways, and food. Duquesne Light has a popular booth in Market Square which hands out free glow sticks to children and adults. In the plaza behind Gateway Center, vendors offer more freebies, and KDKA provides free hot chocolate and cookies.
- Music: Several live performances and concerts occur on Light Up Night. In 2014, Cobra Starship performed onstage near the Roberto Clemente Bridge.
- Fireworks: The night usually ends with fireworks. Originally lighted over Point State Park, in more recent years the fireworks have been launched from the Andy Warhol Bridge (7th Street Bridge) and barges on the Allegheny River.
