= Andrew Carnegie Free Library & Music Hall (Carnegie, Pennsylvania) =

- U.S. National Register of Historic Places
- Pittsburgh Landmark – PHLF
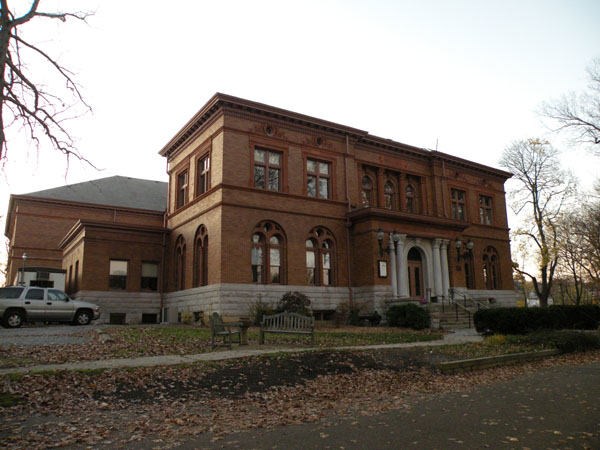

- Location within Pennsylvania Location within the United States
- Location: 300 Beechwood Avenue, Carnegie, Pennsylvania, USA
- Coordinates: 40°24′24.72″N 80°5′9.08″W
- Built: 1899
- Architect: Struthers & Hannah, Dushane & Lewis
- Architectural style: Beaux-Arts
- NRHP reference No.: 81000523

Significant dates
- Added to NRHP: October 8, 1981
- Designated PHLF: 1979

The Andrew Carnegie Free Library & Music Hall (also known as the ACFL&MH or "Carnegie Carnegie") is a public library and music hall located at 300 Beechwood Avenue in Carnegie, Pennsylvania. Like hundreds of other Carnegie libraries, the construction of the ACFL&MH, which opened in 1901, was funded by industrialist Andrew Carnegie. The ACFL&MH has been recognized as a historic landmark and appears on the List of Pittsburgh History and Landmarks Foundation Historic Landmarks and the National Register of Historic Places.

== History ==
Andrew Carnegie's decision to build a library in Carnegie, Pennsylvania, was originally inspired by the town's adoption of his name. In 1894, the neighboring boroughs of Chartiers and Mansfield voted to merge their communities into one larger borough and chose to name their new town in honor of Carnegie. Carnegie was so moved by the gesture that he offered to build a public library in the middle of the town.

On April 26, 1898, Carnegie gifted the town with an initial grant of US$200,000 for the building of the library and an attached music hall, lecture hall, and gymnasium; he also provided an additional $10,000 for the library to purchase books and used any remaining grant funds to start an endowment fund for the new library. Construction of the Andrew Carnegie Free Library and Music Hall began in October 1899 and was completed in less than two years, with the library officially opening to the public in May 1901. The ACFL&MH was added to the List of Pittsburgh History and Landmarks Foundation Historic Landmarks in 1979, and the National Register of Historic Places on October 8, 1981. The ACFL&MH is one of only three buildings in the Chartiers Valley area to be recognized and added to the National Register.

The Andrew Carnegie Free Library & Music Hall holds a unique position as one of the four Carnegie libraries that received endowments from Andrew Carnegie. Whereas most of the towns gifted with Carnegie libraries were required to adhere to the "Carnegie Formula"—an arrangement where the town agreed to subsidize their new library with public taxes—towns with endowed libraries were not required to publicly fund them.
