= Thomas Hannah =

American architect (1867–1935)

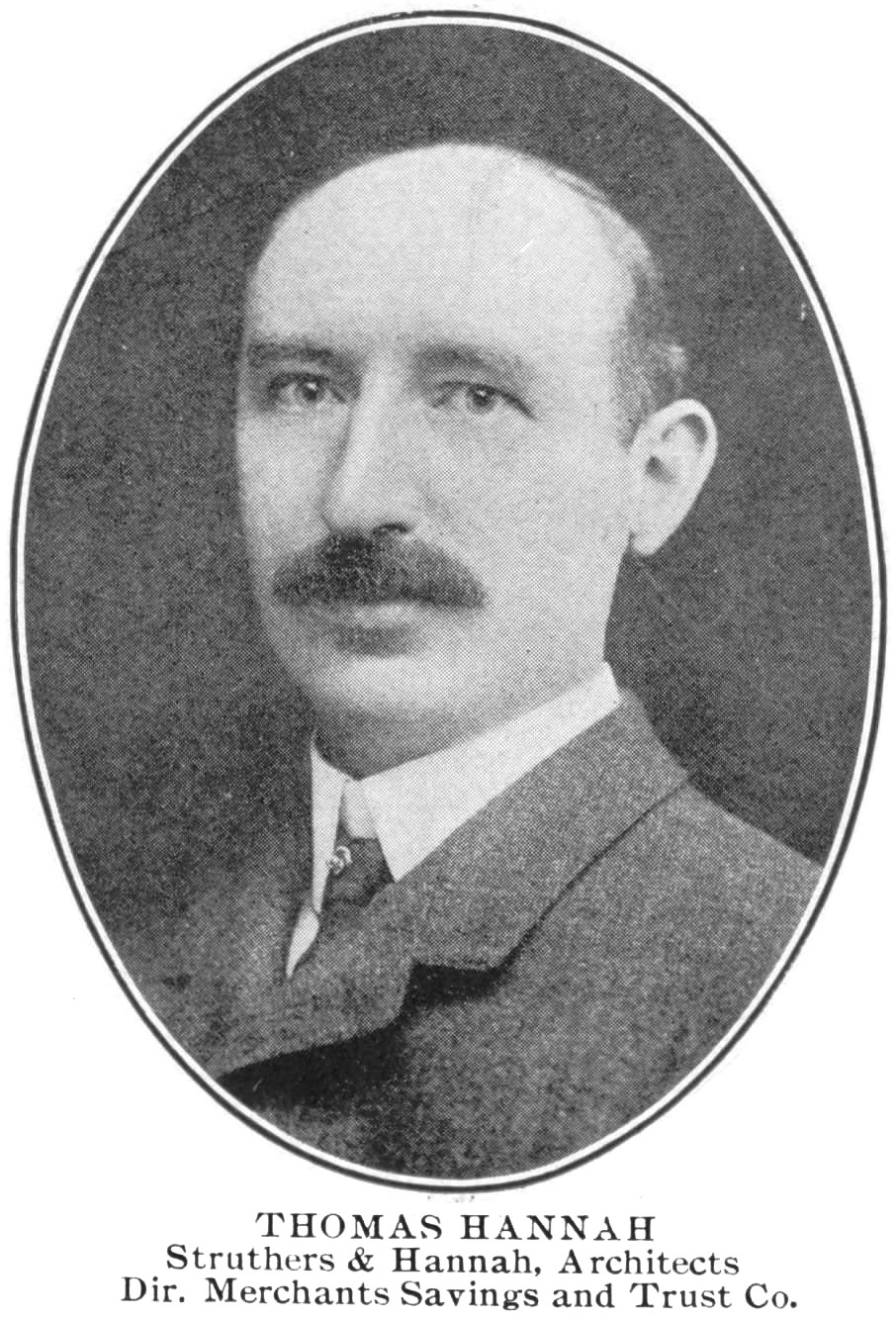
Hannah as depicted in Palmer's Pictorial Pittsburgh, 1905

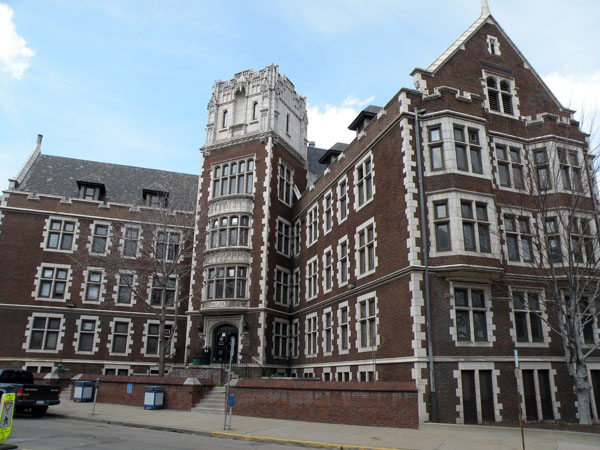
West Hall in Pittsburgh was completed in 1912

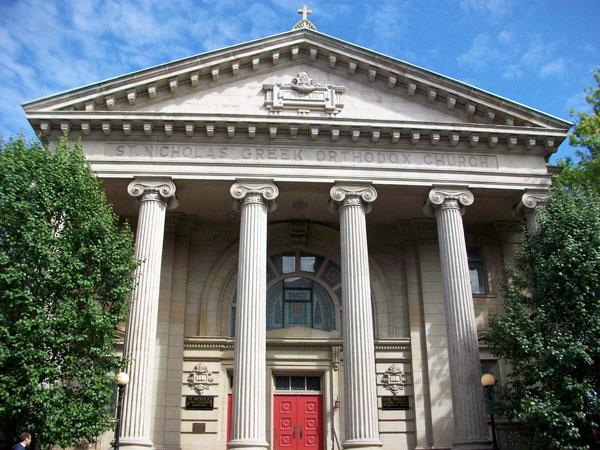
St. Nicholas Greek Orthodox Cathedral, Pittsburgh, built in 1904

Thomas Hannah (1867–1935) was a Scottish-American architect based in Pittsburgh in the United States. He is credited with designing the Saint Nicholas Greek Orthodox Cathedral. He also designed the Western Theological Seminary in Pittsburgh. He also designed Midtown Towers, originally known as the Keenan Building and built in 1907. It was built for Colonel Thomas J. Keenan, owner and founder of the Penny Press, which became Pittsburgh Press. The building may have been modeled after the Spreckel Building/ Call Building (1898) of San Francisco. It is decorated with visages of 10 notables associated with Pittsburgh and Pennsylvania, including then-mayor George Guthrie and then-governor Edwin Stuart, in addition to George Washington and Teddy Roosevelt. The dome was once capped with the figure of an eagle in flight.

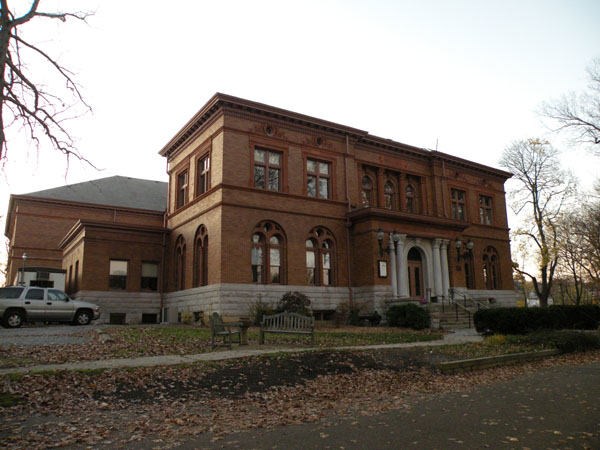
Andrew Carnegie Free Library (Carnegie, Pennsylvania)

Hannah came to Pittsburgh in the late 1800s and began his career as a draftsman in the office of William Smith Fraser. When Fraser died in 1897, Hannah took over the firm with Fraser's nephew William F. Struthers to form Struthers & Hannah. The firm was credited with the design of the Andrew Carnegie Free Library (1901), a Carnegie library at 300 Beechwood Avenue in Carnegie, Pennsylvania. Plans for a Presbyterian church at Hamilton and Lang avenues, alterations to the Commercial National Bank Building at 316 Fourth Ave, brick and terracotta People's National Bank building At the firm, Hannah is credited with The First Congregational Church (1904) on Dithridge Street near Forbes, a sandstone-fronted gray brick building that eventually became the St. Nicholas Greek Orthodox Cathedral.

== Works ==
- Western Theological Seminary/West Hall of the Community College of Allegheny County (1912) at 809 Ridge Avenue in Pittsburgh's Allegheny West neighborhood.
- Gregg House (1909, now part of Chatham University) at 129 Woodland Road in Squirrel Hill. Gregg House, (1907?) was the residence of Chatham University's president for 45 years.
- Midtown Towers (Originally the Keenan Building) (1907) at 643 Liberty Avenue in Pittsburgh. It is a steel frame 18-story building with brick and terracotta. Its dome (flanked by four smaller domes) may have been the world's first made using poured concrete.
- Saint Nicholas Greek Orthodox Cathedral (1904)
- First Presbyterian Church of Edgewood

== Other projects ==
- Horne's Department Store alterations and additions at Penn Avenue and Fifth Street in Pittsburgh (Struthers and Hannah)
- Residence at 254 Orchard Drive for A. G. Spurlock in Pittsburgh City, Allegheny County, Pennsylvania (Mount Lebanon Township, Mission Hills neighborhood)
- Church for the U.P. Congregation at Baltimore Avenue in Beechview, Pennsylvania.
- Ervine House for James S. Ervine at 360 Jefferson Drive in Mount Lebanon Township, Allegheny County, Pennsylvania
- Garage for B. Evanier & Co. at Pacific Ave and Penn Ave in Pittsburgh City, Allegheny County, PA
- Homewood Presbyterian Church at Bennett St and Zenith Way in Pittsburgh City, Allegheny County, PA (Homewood Neighborhood)
- Office Building for Heppenstall Forge & Knife Co. on Butler St in Pittsburgh City, Allegheny County, PA
- Residence for J.M. Shields on Howe St in Pittsburgh City, Allegheny County, PA
- Residence & Garage for William Dressen on Jackson St in Pittsburgh City, Allegheny County, PA
- United Presbyterian Mission Church for Olivet Mission of Shadyside U. P. Church at Ellis St and Liberty Avenue in Pittsburgh City, Allegheny County, PA
- Y.M.C.A. recreation center at 127 Whitfield St in Pittsburgh City, Allegheny County, PA
- Young House for James H. Young at 370 Jefferson Drive in Mount Lebanon Township, Allegheny County, PA
- Store for T. J. Keenan (1907) on Liberty St. in Pittsburgh City, Allegheny County, PA
- Hubbard Shovel Works factory (1907) completed plans for building in Pittsburgh City, Allegheny County, PA
- Hubbard & Co. factory (1907) awarded contracts for building on Butler St (near Sharpsburg Bridge) in Philadelphia, PA
