= Saint Nicholas Greek Orthodox Cathedral (Pittsburgh) =

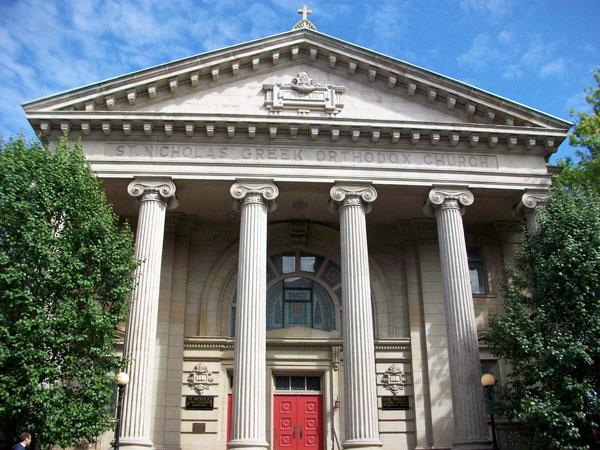
- Saint Nicholas Greek Orthodox Cathedral
- 40°26′40.08″N 79°56′59.91″W
- Location: 419 South Dithridge Street (Oakland), Pittsburgh, Pennsylvania
- Country: United States
- Denomination: Greek Orthodox Church
- Website: https://www.stnickspgh.org/

Architecture
- Architect: Thomas Hannah
- Completed: 1904

Administration
- Metropolis: Metropolis of Pittsburgh
- Archdiocese: Archdiocese of America

Clergy
- Archbishop: Savas (Zembillas)
- Dean: Fr. Eleftherios Constantine

Pittsburgh Landmark – PHLF
- Designated: 1982

Saint Nicholas Greek Orthodox Cathedral located at 419 South Dithridge Street in the Oakland neighborhood of Pittsburgh, Pennsylvania, was designed by architect Thomas Hannah and built in 1904. The First Congregational Church built the structure and used it until 1921, but it has been a Greek Orthodox Church since 1923. Currently, it is part of the Greek Orthodox Archdiocese of America, and seat of the Greek Orthodox Metropolis of Pittsburgh. This Classical Revival style church building was added to the List of Pittsburgh History and Landmarks Foundation Historic Landmarks in 1982.

Architecturally, the cathedral is described by Walter C. Kidney in his book Landmark Architecture: Pittsburgh and Allegheny County (1985) as:

A Grecian Ionic portico, executed in sandstone, is the grand and appropriate introduction to a church that has belonged to the Greek Orthodox Church since 1923. The exterior, with its big round-arched windows, is not otherwise specifically symbolic, but the interior is rich with paintings and mosaics. Notable inside are the painting in the dome of Christ the Pantocrator (Ruler of All), with its background of gold leaf, and the iconostasis of metal and mosaic, with peacocks finely depicted on the Royal Doors. Further art is to be found within the sanctuary, including a painting of the Mother and Child and a fresco of the Last Supper."

Franklin Toker describes the structure in his book Pittsburgh: A New Portrait (2009) as follows: "Originally the First Congregational Church, until 1921, this is an unusually vigorous design in yellow industrial brick preceded by a dramatic Ionic portico. The interior of St. Nicholas should not be missed as an architectural paradigm of America itself: a cool Protestant interior heated up by a blazing iconostasis."

== See also ==
- List of cathedrals in the United States
- List of Pittsburgh History and Landmarks Foundation Historic Landmarks
