= Pittsburgh crèche =

Nativity scene in downtown Pittsburgh

The crèche displayed in the courtyard during the holiday season

The Pittsburgh crèche is a large-scale, American crèche, or nativity scene, that is located on the outside courtyard of the U.S. Steel Tower in downtown Pittsburgh, Pennsylvania. Since 1999, the crèche appears annually during the winter season from November's Light Up Night to Epiphany in January.

It is the only authorized replica of the nativity scene in Saint Peter’s Basilica in Rome. It is sponsored by the ecumenical Christian Leaders Fellowship.

== History ==
In 1989, local attorney Roslyn Litman pursued a case to the Supreme Court, which banned a nativity scene displayed in the Allegheny Courthouse due to its religious implications (in violation of the Establishment Clause) in County of Allegheny v. American Civil Liberties Union.

In the wake of this ruling, managers of the U.S. Steel Tower erected their own version of a crèche in downtown Pittsburgh, this time on privately owned land. Louis D. Astorino, chairman of the architectural firm L.D. Astorino Companies, traveled to Rome and was inspired to recreate the nativity scene in Pittsburgh.

The Pittsburgh Crèche Endowment Fund was created in 2006 to raise donations for the crèche construction and restoration each year.

== Design ==
The crèche is a replica of the stable constructed by Italian architect Umberto Mezzana. It is 64 feet wide, 42 feet high, and 36 feet long. The human sculptures were designed by Pietro Simonelli.

=== Figures ===
The number of figures featured in the crèche has increased over time. The original 1999 display featured baby Jesus, Mary, Joseph, the Three Kings, two shepherds, and an assortment of animals. The next year, Simonelli added an angel that hung over the crib and more animals. In 2001, a woman and child were added. In 2002, JE Scenic Technologies added a kneeling shepherd, and later, they created a reclining cow. Two more shepherds and two more angels were later included, bringing the total figures in the display to 20.
