= Penn–Liberty Historic District =

Historic district in Pennsylvania, United States

- U.S. National Register of Historic Places
- U.S. Historic district
- City of Pittsburgh Historic District
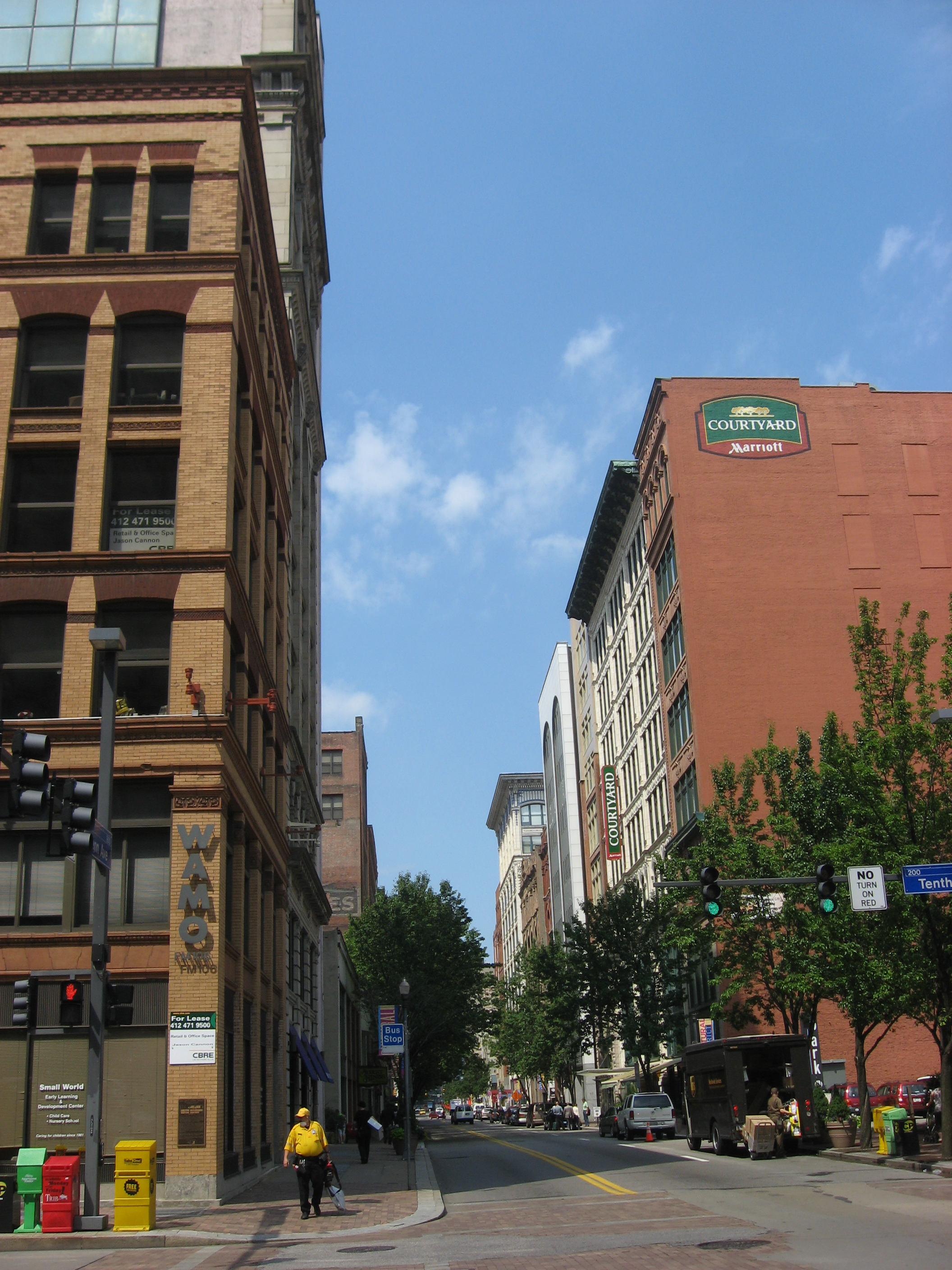

- Location within Pennsylvania
- Location: Roughly bounded by French and 10th Streets, Liberty and Penn Avenues, and 9th Street (Downtown Pittsburgh), Pittsburgh, Pennsylvania, USA
- Coordinates: 40°26′38″N 79°59′49″W
- Architect: Multiple
- Architectural style: Queen Anne, Italianate
- NRHP reference No.: 87001995

Significant dates
- Added to NRHP: November 18, 1987
- Designated CPHS: October 1987, and expanded March 1999

The Penn–Liberty Historic District is a historic district in the downtown Pittsburgh, Pennsylvania, United States. The district was listed on the National Register of Historic Places on November 18, 1987.
