= Savas Zembillas =

His Eminence Savas
- Metropolitan of Pittsburgh
- Archdiocese: America
- See: Pittsburgh
- Installed: December 8, 2011
- Term ended: Incumbent
- Predecessor: Maximos (Aghiorgoussis)
- Other post: Bishop of Troas

Orders
- Ordination: November 21, 1992 (diaconate); January 8, 1995 (priesthood)
- Consecration: February 2, 2002

Personal details
- Born: Savas Zembillas; 11 June 1957 (age 69) Gary, Indiana
- Denomination: Greek Orthodox
- Education: Colby College; Holy Cross Greek Orthodox School of Theology

Metropolitan Savas of Pittsburgh, secular name Savas Zembillas (born 11 June 1957) is the spiritual leader of the Greek Orthodox Metropolis of Pittsburgh which includes all of Ohio and most of Pennsylvania and West Virginia. The Metropolis consists of 53 parishes and six monastic communities which minister to the needs of thousands of Greek Orthodox faithful. The Metropolis offices are in Pittsburgh, Pennsylvania.

Bishop Savas was elected to the office of Metropolitan of Pittsburgh on November 2, 2011, by the Holy and Sacred Synod of the Ecumenical Patriarchate in Constantinople, and was enthroned December 8, 2011 at Saint Nicholas Greek Orthodox Cathedral in Pittsburgh.

== Early life and education ==
Metropolitan Savas was born Savas Zembillas in Gary, Indiana, on June 11, 1957, the second of six children of Skevofylax ("Steve") and Stamatia (Georgiades) Zembillas. Graduating from Andrean High School in Gary in 1975, he entered Colby College in Waterville, Maine, where he earned a BA in Philosophy and English Literature (1979). While at Colby, he performed as the lead singer for campus punk band Mick and the Malignants.

He also graduated from Holy Cross Greek Orthodox School of Theology in Brookline, Massachusetts (1984, M.Div. with highest honors). He continued his studies at Oxford University, England, under the supervision of then Bishop Kallistos Ware.

== Early service ==
He served as parish priest of the Greek Orthodox Church of the Annunciation in Kalamazoo, Michigan (1995–1997), and was subsequently assigned (now with the honorary title of archimandrite) to pastor the Greek Orthodox Church of St. Demetrios in Merrick, New York (1997–1999).

== Early episcopacy ==
Prior to his election to the throne of Pittsburgh, Metropolitan Savas served as the titular Bishop of Troas (2001–2011), overlapping times when he was also the Chancellor of the Greek Orthodox Archdiocese (1999–2009) and Director of the Archdiocesan Office of Church, Society and Culture (2009–2011).

Metropolitan Savas has been an active participant in the social network structures of the Internet, engaging issues of contemporary culture and society from an Orthodox Christian perspective. He has led numerous pilgrimages of young adults to Constantinople and the Holy Land, in addition to missionary teams to Kenya and Tanzania. He is presently the Chairman of the Committee for Church and Society of the Assembly of Canonical Orthodox Bishops of the United States of America.

== See also ==
- Greek Orthodox Metropolis of Pittsburgh
- Greek Orthodox Archdiocese of America
- Ecumenical Patriarchate of Constantinople

Eastern Orthodox Church titles
Preceded by Maximos (Aghiorgoussis)	Metropolitan of Pittsburgh; 2011 –	Succeeded by Incumbent
Preceded by Alexios (Panagiotopoulos)	Bishop of Troas; 2001 – 2011	Succeeded by Vacant
