= Horne's =

American chain of department stores

Joseph Horne Company

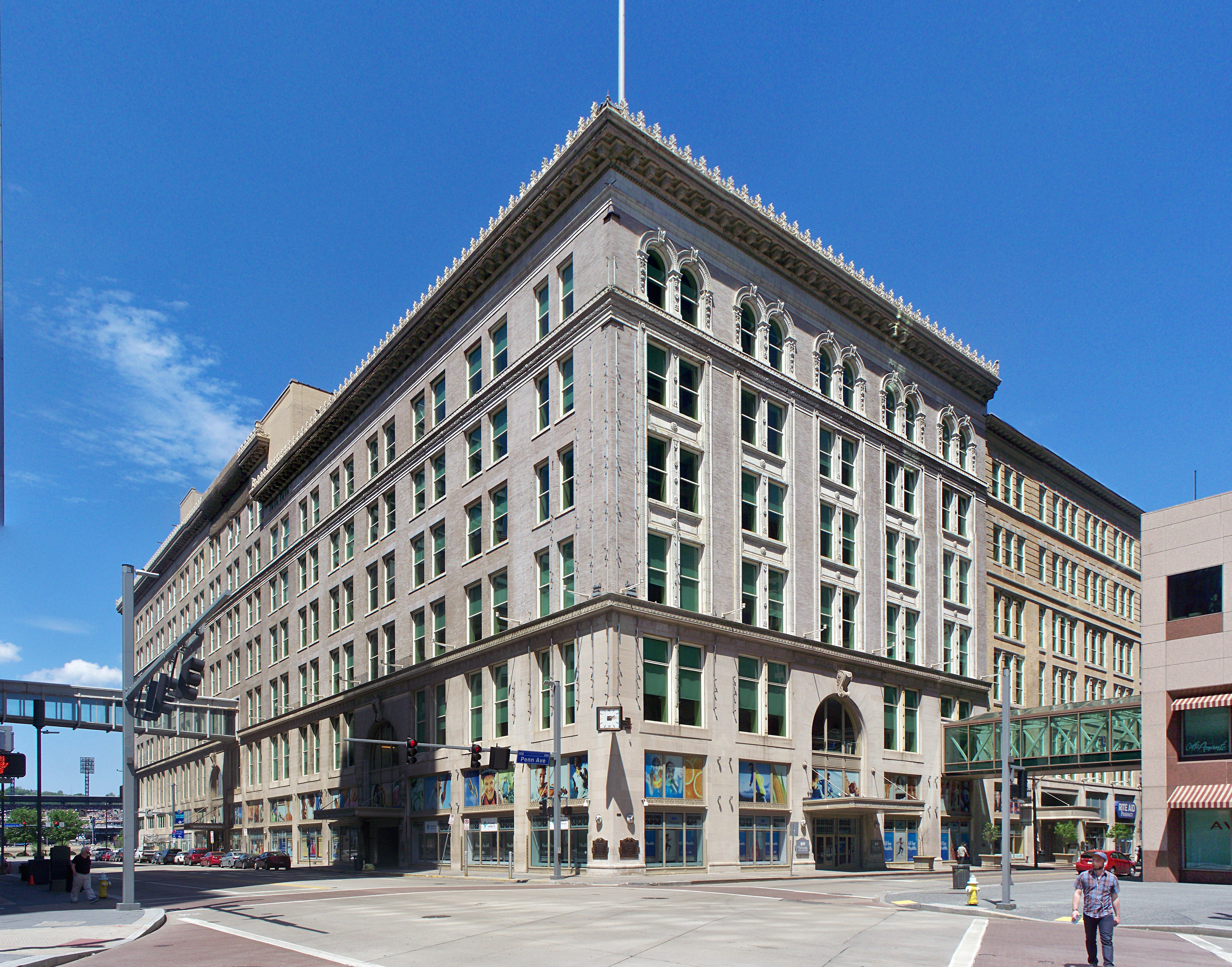
- Former Joseph Horne Company flagship store in Downtown Pittsburgh
- Type: Department store
- Industry: Retail
- Founded: February 22, 1849
- Defunct: August 29, 1994
- Fate: Merged with Lazarus or sold to Dillard's
- Successor: Dillard's; Lazarus
- Headquarters: Pittsburgh, Pennsylvania
- Products: Clothing, footwear, bedding, furniture, jewelry, beauty products, and housewares

The Joseph Horne Company, often referred to simply as Joseph Horne's or Horne's, was an American department store chain based in Pittsburgh, Pennsylvania. The store was one of the oldest in the country being founded on February 22, 1849, but was often overlooked as it maintained only a regional presence. The chain ceased operations in 1994 after being merged with the Lazarus division of Federated Department Stores.

== Founders ==
Joseph Horne (1826–1892) was born in Bedford County, Pennsylvania, the son of John Horn and Catherine Otto, grandson of Henry Horn, who had served in the Continental Army. Joseph moved three counties west to Pittsburgh and found his first job in the retail trade with Christian Yeager. Soon, Joseph moved to the F.H. Eaton store, and became a partner. He bought the business in 1849, at age 23, renaming it The Joseph Horne Company. He joined forces with Christian B. Shea and A. P. Burchfield, whose families intermarried and entered the business. He married twice — first to Mary Elizabeth Shea, later to Emma Galway — and sired numerous children. His son Durbin Horne, born in 1854, was among Horne's children who followed their father into the family business. Joseph Horne died in 1892.

Christian Bernard Shea (1835–1900) was the brother-in-law of Joseph Horne, and his founding partner in The Joseph Horne Company. Shea was involved with both halves of the family business — retail (Joseph Horne Co. Department Store) and wholesale (Pittsburgh Dry Goods Company).

Durbin Horne and Christian Shea were both members of the South Fork Fishing and Hunting Club, whose defective dam, altered to benefit the club, caused thousands of deaths during the 1889 Johnstown Flood.

== History ==
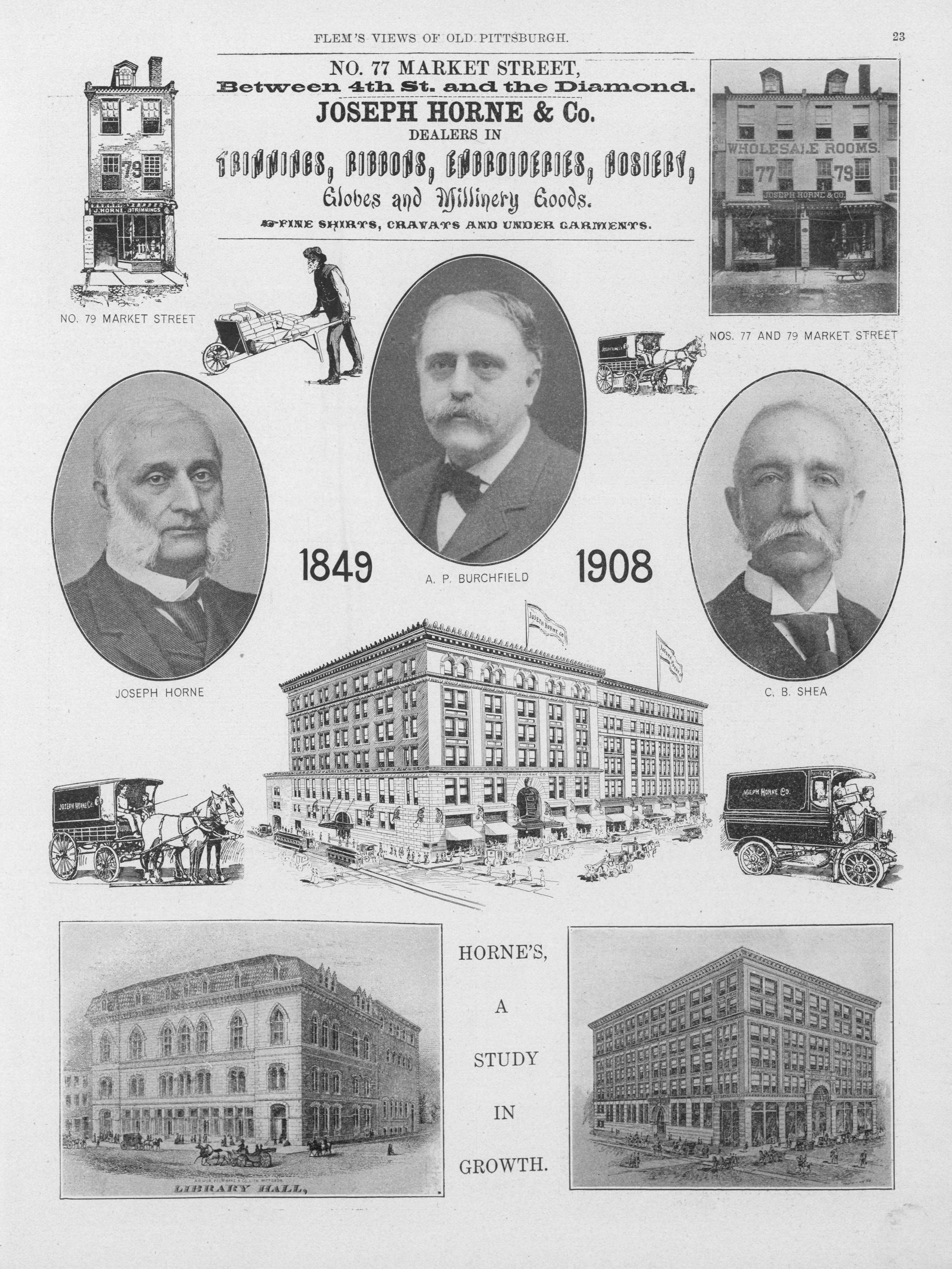
Advertisement depicting the founders and buildings of the Joseph Horne Company

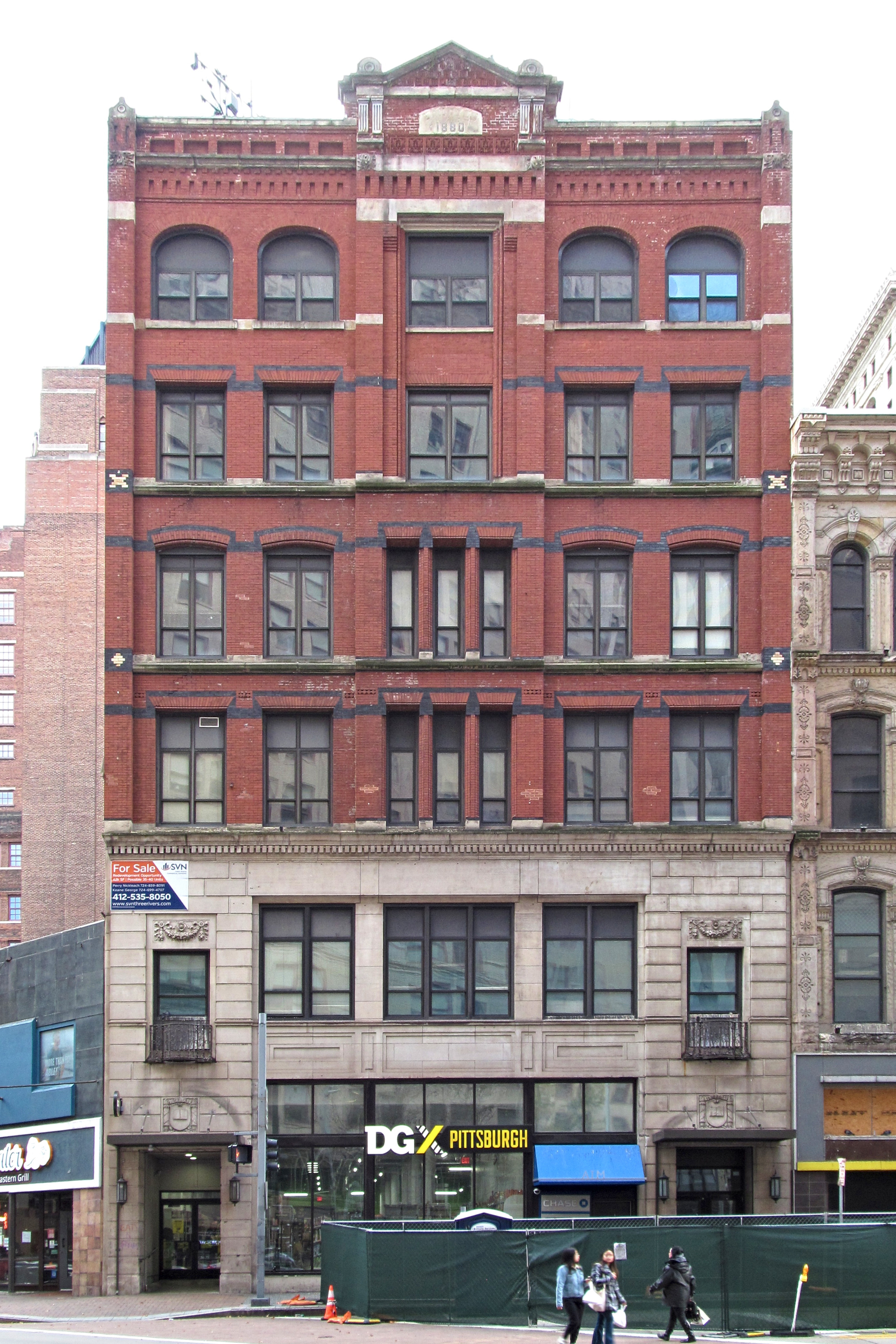
Former Joseph Horne Company building at Wood St. and Liberty Ave.

Soon after Joseph Horne bought the Eaton Co., the Joseph Horne Company became a leading Pittsburgh department store. The store was initially located on Market Street, then moved to the recently completed Mercantile Library Hall on Penn Avenue—now the site of the O'Reilly Theater—in 1871. In 1881, the firm built a new building at Wood Street and Liberty Avenue for its wholesale division. In 1891, at age 65, Horne sold the wholesale side of his company's operations to the Pittsburgh Dry Goods Company.

The flagship Horne's store at Penn Avenue and Stanwix Street in Downtown Pittsburgh originally opened on July 31, 1893, and was subsequently rebuilt twice after devastating fires in 1897 and 1900. The six-story main building and a seven-story addition dating to 1923 were both designed by Boston-based architects Peabody and Stearns. The neighboring building on Penn Avenue, originally an office building, also became part of the department store in 1903. The store complex still stands and several Horne's signs remain on the building as they do at the former Pittsburgh rival Kaufmann's on Smithfield Street.

In 1966, Associated Dry Goods (ADG) acquired Horne's, and ADG expanded operations of Horne's to several stores in suburban malls throughout the Pittsburgh region as well as in Erie, Pennsylvania and Northeast Ohio. In December 1986, Horne's was acquired by a local investor group following ADG's acquisition by May Department Stores. The local buyout was part of May's divesting of the Horne's chain, since May was already the owner of cross-town rival Kaufmann's.

Two years later, the Arkansas-based department store chain Dillard's and Edward J. DeBartolo Sr. agreed to acquire Horne's, with plans of combining it with another recent acquisition for Dillard's — the Ohio-based Higbee's store chain. The deal was canceled abruptly, resulting in several years of litigation. Dillard's eventually agreed to acquire five Ohio Horne's stores as part of a legal settlement in 1992.

In 1994, Federated Department Stores acquired the remaining ten Horne's stores and merged them with its Lazarus division, completely ceasing all operations of any store under the Horne's name by August 29, 1994. This caused some anger among Pittsburgh shoppers, as Horne's was the oldest store in the city and had been a 145-year-old Pittsburgh tradition. After its closure the company was often praised for surviving 145 years with only a maximum of 15 stores. Several former Horne's locations operating as Lazarus closed in 1998. Those that remained eventually became "Lazarus-Macy's" and in 2006 were joined with Kaufmann's in the nationwide Macy's consolidation.

== Flagship store ==
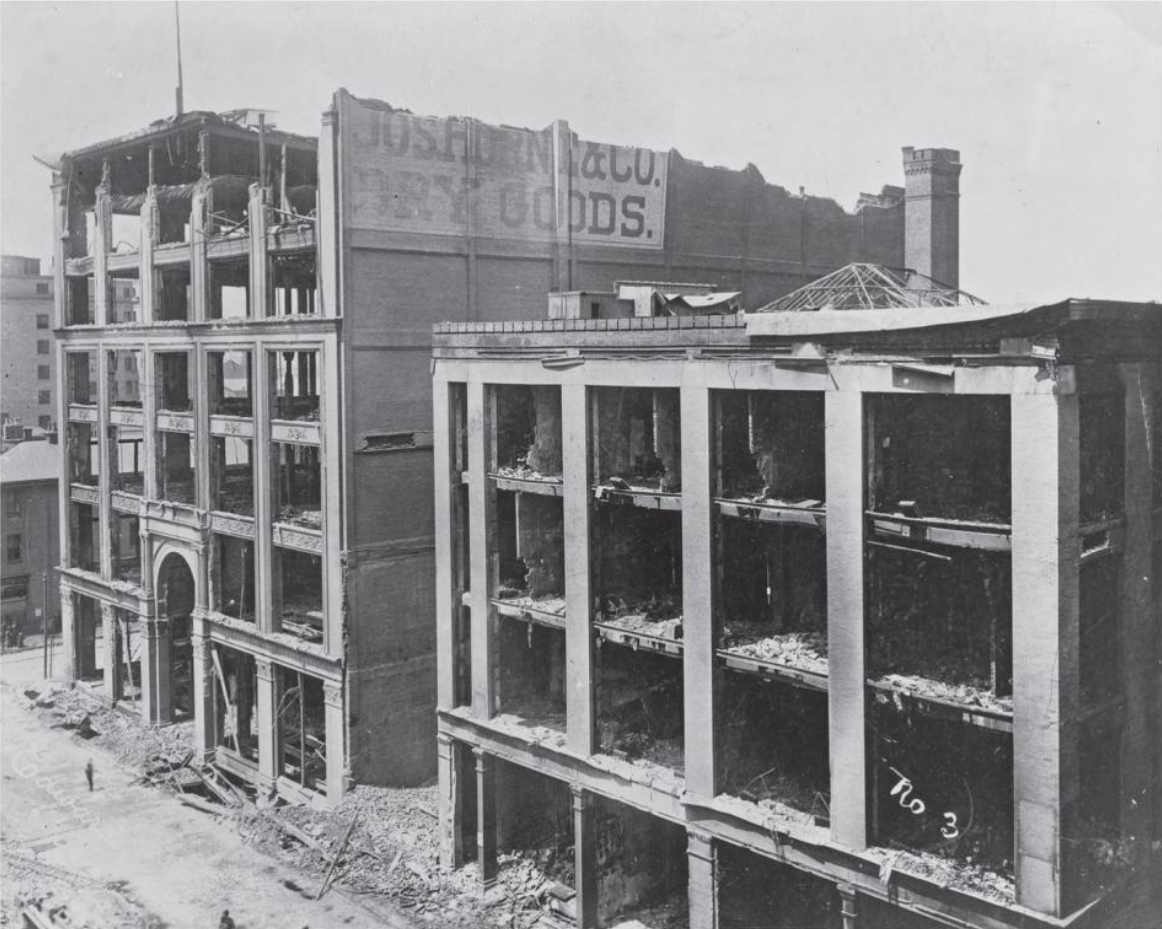
Horne department store (left) and office building (right) shortly after the major fire in 1897

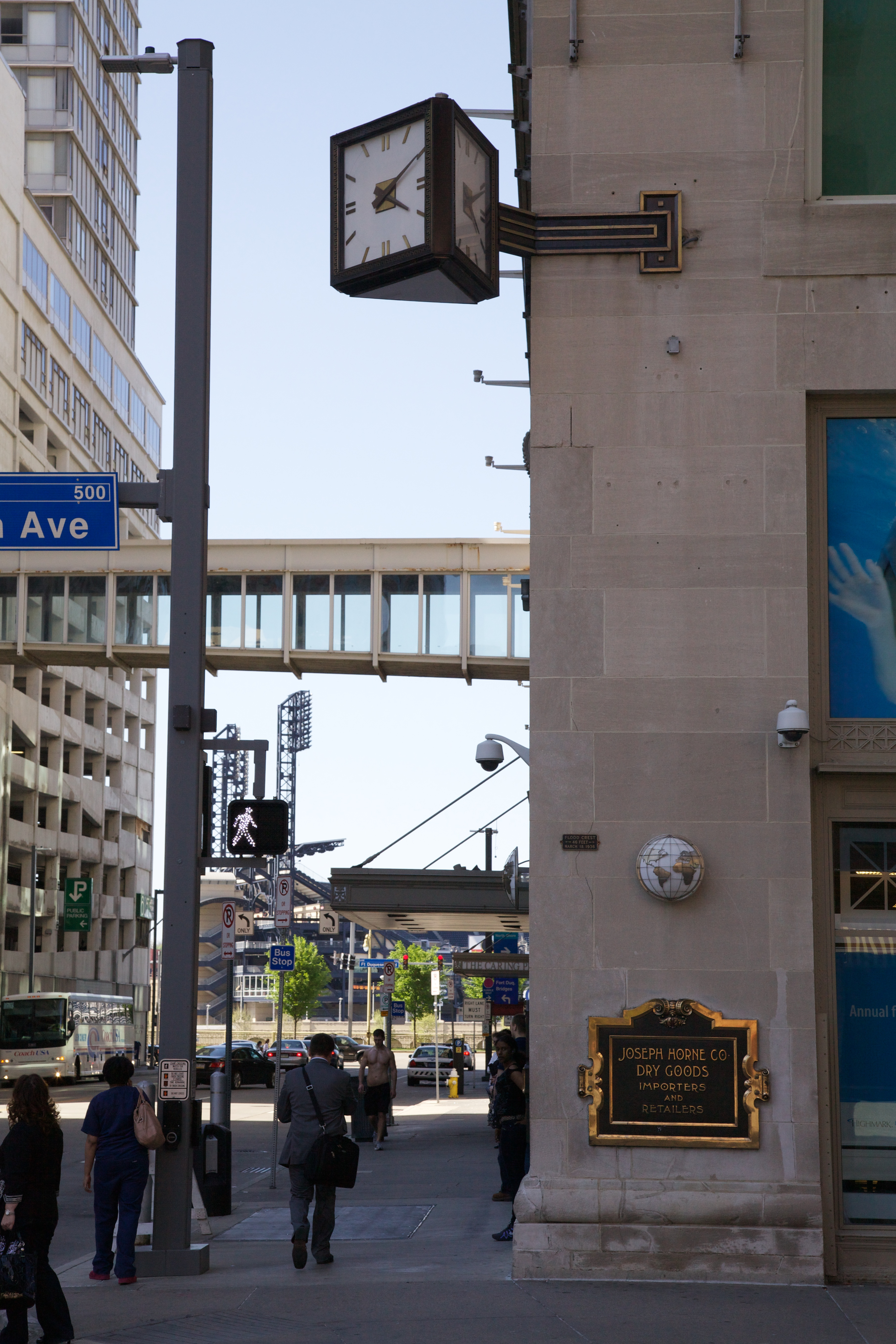
A view of the clock

The former Joseph Horne Company flagship department store is located at the corner of Penn Avenue and Stanwix Street in downtown Pittsburgh. The L-shaped structure is actually three buildings built over the course of time. The central six-story building is 120 feet (37 m) by 180 feet (55 m), fronting on Penn Avenue, and was originally built in 1893 to a design by Pittsburgh architect William Smith Fraser. In 1897, the building was almost completely destroyed by a fire even though it had been built using early fireproofing technologies. The results were widely discussed by engineers and some of the lessons learned were incorporated into the replacement building designed by Boston-based architects Peabody and Stearns. The new building was very similar in size and appearance to the original. The building was again heavily damaged by a fire in 1900 but fared better this time with the walls and steel frame surviving largely intact.

The building to the east on Penn Avenue was also designed by Fraser and built in 1895. Originally a four-story office building, it was separated from the Horne store by a single house whose owner had refused to sell. When the house burned down in the 1897 fire, the office building—also badly damaged—was rebuilt and expanded into the adjoining space. Subsequently, the Horne department store took over the office building in 1903, and its height was increased to six stories. Struthers & Hannah were the architects for the remodeling. The third building, which makes up the rear of the present structure, is seven stories high and is also attributed to Peabody and Stearns. It was built in 1922–23.

The store had four entrances — two on Stanwix Street, and two on Penn Avenue and contained 630,000 square feet (59,000 m^{2}) of selling space, making it the city's second largest department store. The store bore the Horne's name until August 29, 1994 when it became Lazarus. Lazarus only remained in the building for one year before closing the store and building a new location on Fifth Avenue. Oxford Development Co purchased the building with hopes of ground level retail while renting floors two through seven to Highmark Blue Cross Blue Shield. Old Navy opened 20,000 square feet (1,900 m^{2}) on the first two floors in 1996, but closed in 2003. Highmark Blue Cross Blue Shield then purchased the structure and occupies the office space to this day with retail space at ground level.

The department store complex was designated a Historic Landmark by the Pittsburgh History and Landmarks Foundation in 1982.

== Horne's Tree ==
The lighting of the Horne's Christmas tree at the flagship store was a long-held holiday season tradition. The six-story electric tree occupied a place on the corner of the building at Penn Avenue and Stanwix Street and viewers would crowd the area for a show and the lighting. Crowds also eagerly awaited the Christmas window displays at Horne's.

The tree was designed by R. Keith Manherz in 1953 while working for Pittsburgh Outdoor Advertising Co as their art director. It is still displayed annually in the tradition of Pittsburgh's Light Up Night at the Horne's building.

== Left over Horne's ==
Several years after the closing of the last Horne's stores, several signs remain at the historic downtown flagship store building, each bearing the Horne's name. On the southwest corner of the building, two bronze plaques remain reading "Joseph Horne Co Dry Goods Importers and Retailers". Also, the frieze above the two entrances in the first structure reads "1849 – Joseph Horne Co. – 1879" marking the founding of the company and the year of construction, while the frieze of the 1922 addition bears that date. The sidewalk slabs adjoining the entrances have inlays of the Horne's logo.

== Horne's and popular culture ==
Artist Andy Warhol worked at a Horne's location in the store's display department as a summer job in 1947.

The television series Twin Peaks referenced a fictional Horne's store and owner, Ben Joseph Horne, which were inspired by the real Horne's. Series co-creator Mark Frost attended Carnegie Mellon University in Pittsburgh.

Horne's also appeared in movies, including the Monroeville Mall location, which was shown in George A. Romero's 1978 movie Dawn of the Dead. The Pittsburgh flagship store was the site of the 1987 erotic thriller, Lady Beware, which starred Diane Lane as a window designer employed there. This was Horne's most notable appearance, as in addition to the location, the store's name appeared. Diane Lane's character worked at Horne's.

== See also ==
- List of department stores converted to Macy's
- List of defunct department stores of the United States
