= Badovas =

Rock in Meteora, Greece

- Μπάντοβας
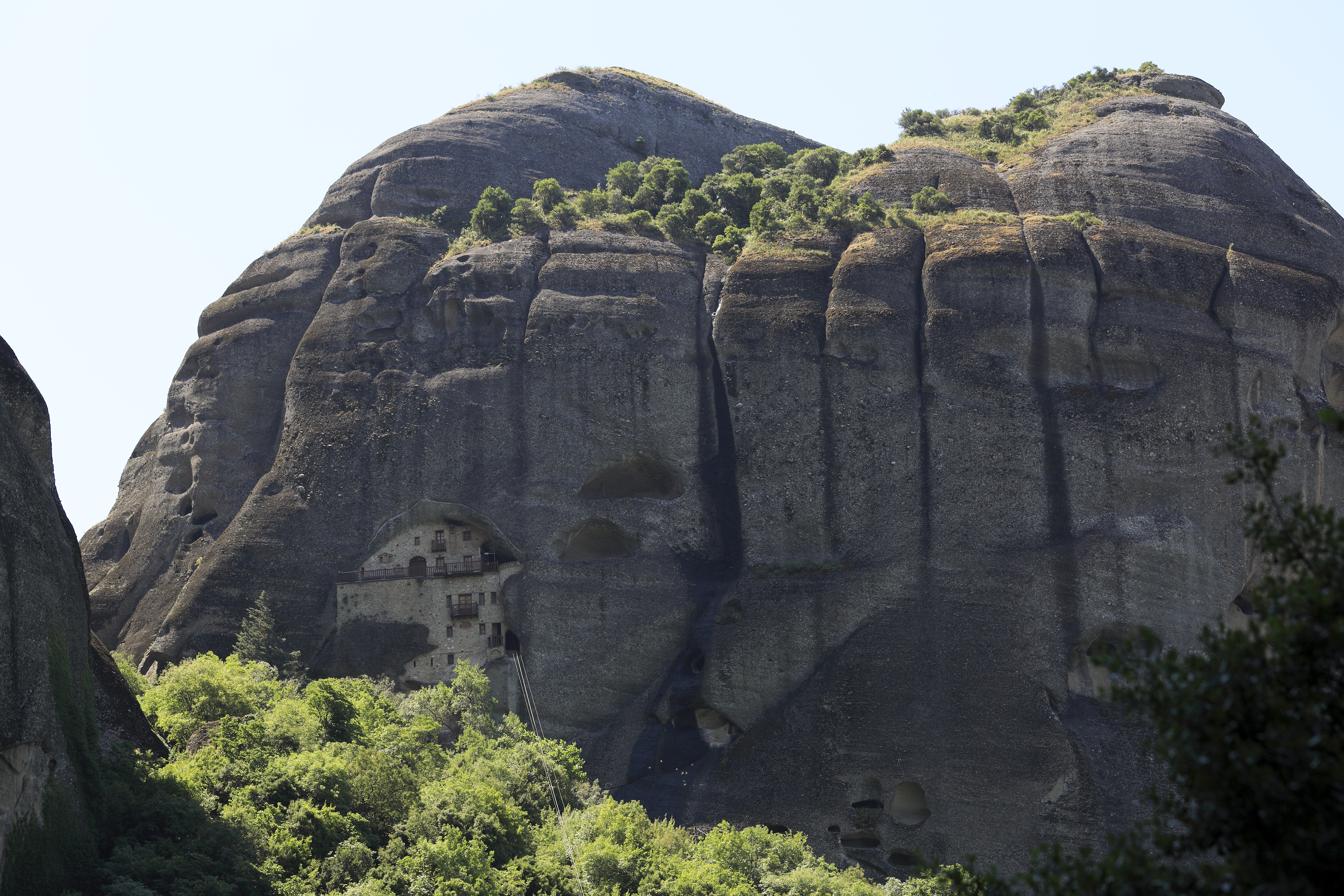

Highest point
- Elevation: 447.3 m (1,468 ft)
- Coordinates: 39.7105451°N 21.6217265°E

Geography
- Location within Greece
- Location: Meteora
- Country: Greece
- Region: Thessaly
- Regional unit: Trikala
- Settlement: Kalabaka

Badovas or Bantovas (Greek: Μπάντοβας) is a rock in the Meteora rock formation complex of Thessaly, Greece.

== Monasteries ==
The Monastery of St. Nicholas of Badova / Nikolaus Kofina (Agiou Nikolaou tou Bantova, Αγίου Νικολάου του Μπάντοβα / Agiou Nikolaou Kofina, Αγίου Νικολάου Κοφινά) (39.710731°N 21.622125°E) was founded c. 1400 in a rock cave at Badovas. In 1943, it was bombed and destroyed by the Germans.

The ruins of the Monastery of St. Nicholas of Petra (St. Nicholas of Skala) (Μονή Αγίου Νικολάου της Πέτρας) (39.710824°N 21.621164°E) are also located on Badovas Rock, just to the west of the monastery of St. Nicholas of Badova.

== Access ==
The rock can be reached via a trail that branches off from the gate of the main road leading up to the Monastery of St. Anthony (Agiou Antoniou, Αγίου Αντωνίου), which is the main monastery building of Pyxari Rock. There is no direct access to the monastery ruins.
