= Monastery of St John the Baptist =

Monastery of St. John the Baptist can refer to:

- Monastery of St. John the Baptist (Meteora)
- Patriarchal Stavropegic Monastery of St John the Baptist
- St. John the Baptist Monastery, Moscopole
