= Ambaria =

Rock in Meteora, Greece

- Αμπάρια
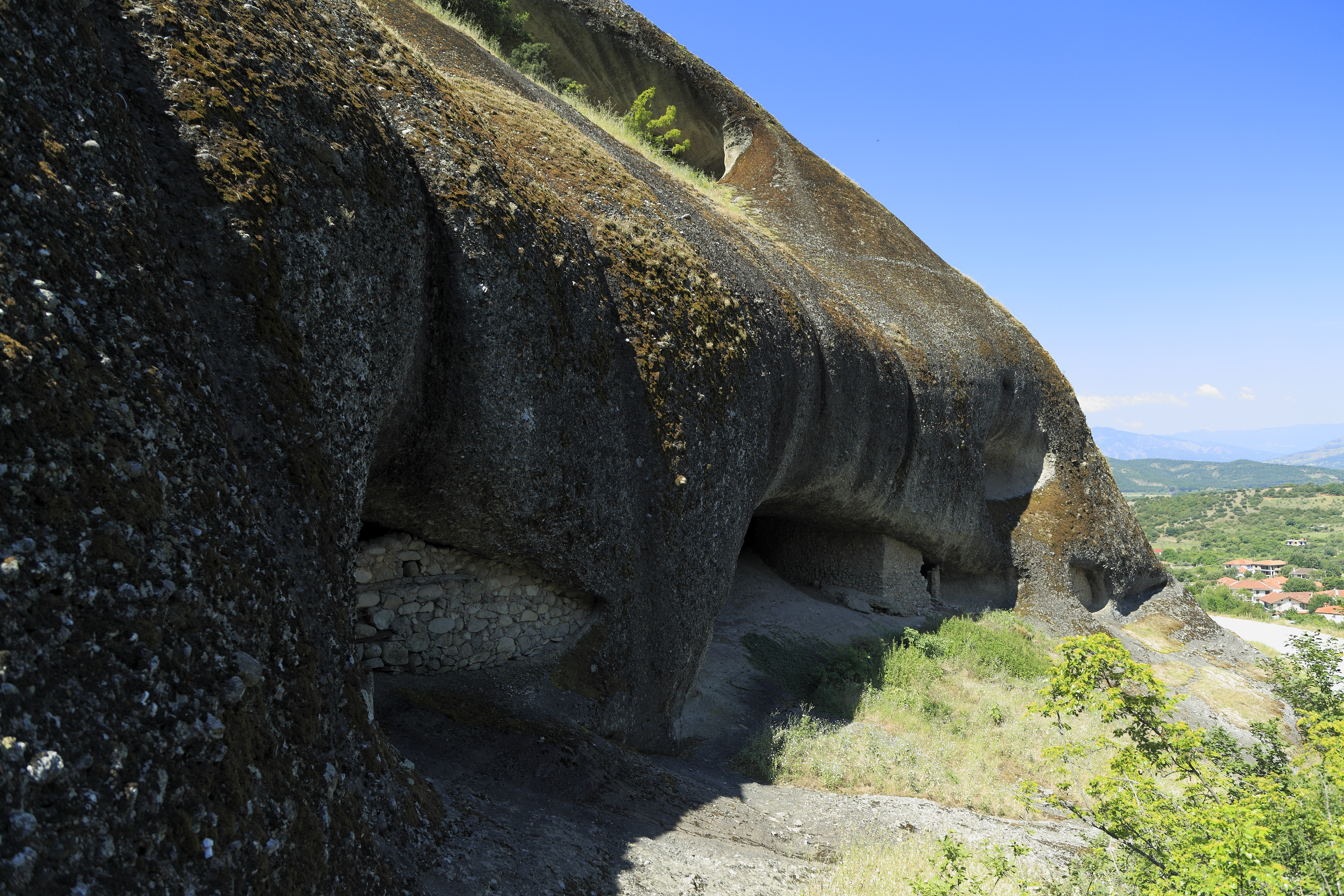

Highest point
- Elevation: 400 m (1,300 ft)
- Coordinates: 39°42′40″N 21°37′08″E

Geography
- Location within Greece
- Location: Meteora
- Country: Greece
- Administrative region: Thessaly
- Regional unit: Trikala
- Town: Kalabaka

Ambaria (Greek: Αμπάρια) is a rock in the Meteora rock formation complex of Thessaly, Greece.

Ambaria has cave hermitages formerly inhabited by Orthodox Christian ascetics. The Panagia Monastery (Μονή Παναγιάς) was likely located at Ambaria.

== Access ==
Ambaria has about 10 small caves that are used as sheep stables. Visitors can climb directly to the caves from the main asphalt road bordering the western side of the rock.
