= Meteora =

Rock formations and monasteries in Thessaly, Greece

- Μετέωρα (Greek)
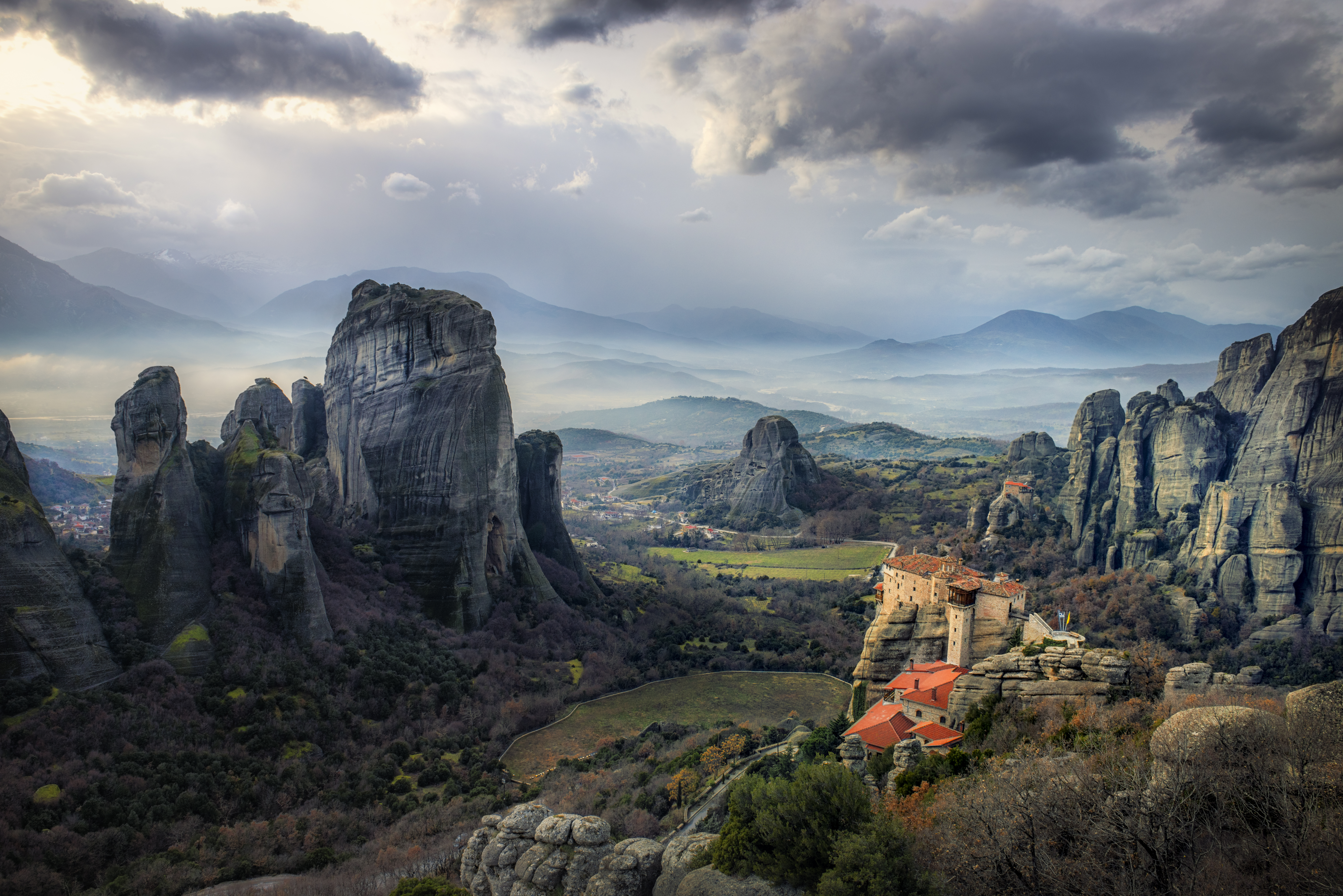
- Landscape of Meteora

- Location in Greece
- 39°42′51″N 21°37′52″E
- Location: Trikala, Thessaly, Greece

Site notes
- Area: Thessaly

UNESCO World Heritage Site
- Official name: Meteora
- Type: Cultural
- Criteria: i, ii, iv, v, vii
- Designated: 1988 (12th session)
- Reference no.: 455
- Region: Europe

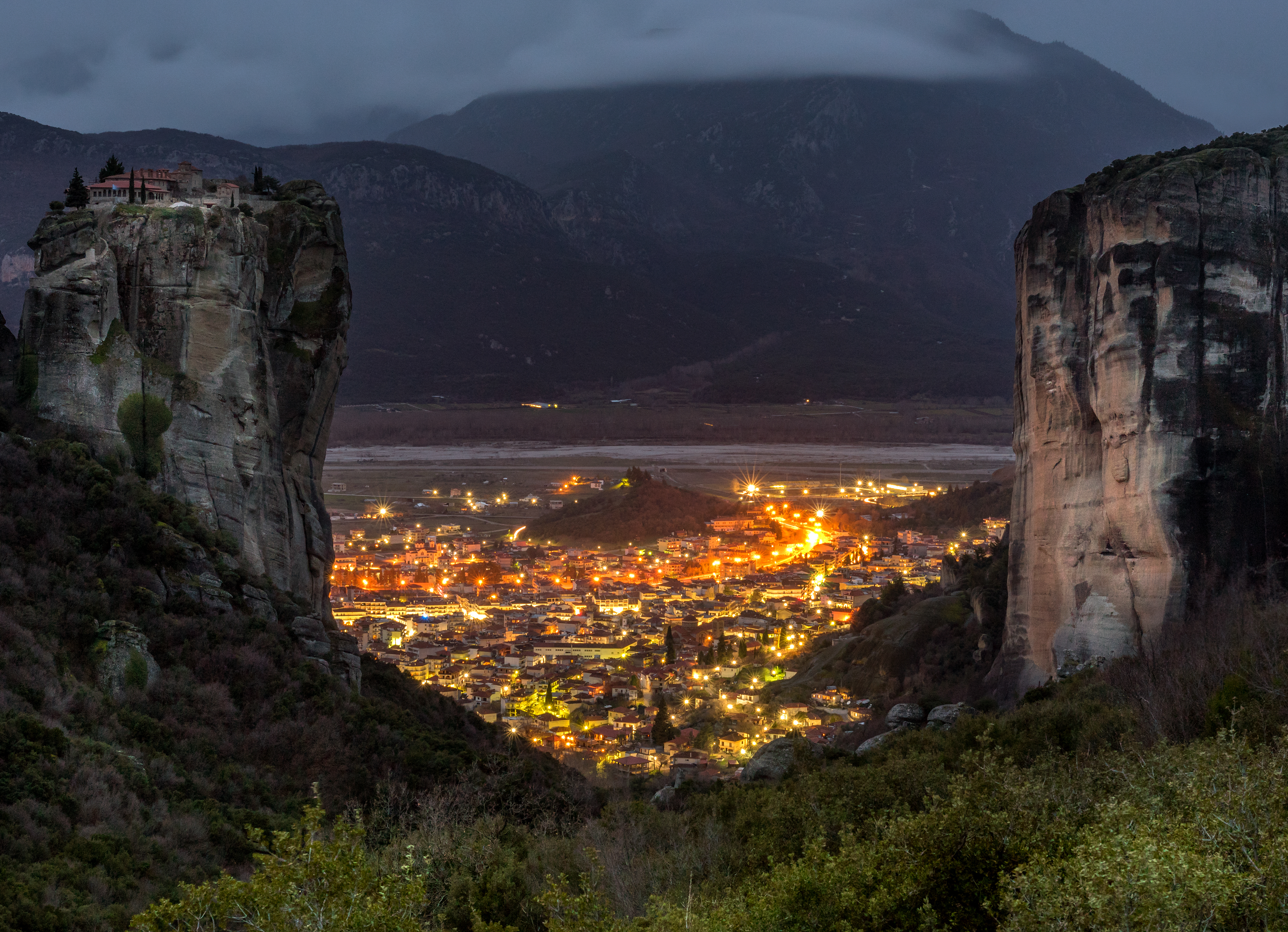
Meteora by night

Meteora (/miːtiːˈʊərə/; Greek: Μετέωρα, pronounced [meˈteora]) is a rock formation in the regional unit of Trikala, in Thessaly, in northwestern Greece, hosting one of the most prominent complexes of Eastern Orthodox monasteries, viewed locally as second in importance only to Mount Athos. Their height is more than 20 metres (66 ft).

Twenty-four monasteries were established atop the giant natural pillars and hill-like rounded boulders that dominate the local area, mainly from the second half of the 14th century under the local rule of self-proclaimed Emperor of Serbs, Greeks and Albanians, Simeon Uroš. As of December 2025, four of the original monasteries were occupied, in active use as monasteries that are managed by monks, and open to visitors: the monasteries of Great Meteoron (est. 1356), Varlaam, Holy Trinity, and Saint Stephen – the latter became a convent run by a community of nuns in 1961. Two other former monasteries are extant, yet no longer in active use as monasteries: the Saint Nicholas Anapausas and Rousanou monasteries.

Meteora is located in between the town of Kalabaka and the village of Kastraki at the northwestern edge of the Plain of Thessaly near the Pineios river and Pindus Mountains. The Meteora complex, comprising the six extant monasteries, was added to the UNESCO World Heritage List in 1988 because of its outstanding architecture and beauty, combined with religious and cultural significance.

The name means "lofty", "elevated", and is etymologically related to meteor.

== Geology ==
Beside the Pindos Mountains, in the western region of Thessaly, these unusual columns of rock rise precipitously from the ground. But their unusual form is not easy to explain geologically. However, they are not like the typical volcanic plugs of igneous rock found elsewhere, as they are composed of a mixture of sandstone and conglomerate.

The conglomerate was formed of deposits of stone, sand, and mud from streams flowing into a delta at the edge of a lake, over millions of years. About 60 million years ago during the Paleogene period a series of earth movements pushed the seabed upward, creating a high plateau and causing many vertical fault lines in the thick layer of sandstone. The huge rock pillars were then formed by weathering by water, wind, and extremes of temperature on the vertical faults. It is unusual that this conglomerate formation and type of weathering are confined to a relatively localised area within the surrounding mountain formation. The complex is referred to an exhumed continental remnant of Pangean association.

This type of rock formation and weathering process has happened in many other places locally and throughout the world, but what makes Meteora's appearance special is the uniformity of the sedimentary rock constituents deposited over millions of years leaving few signs of vertical layering, and the localised abrupt vertical weathering.

Excavations and research have discovered petrified diatoms in Theopetra Cave, which have contributed to understanding the Palaeo-climate and climate changes. Radiocarbon dating evidences human presence dating back 50,000 years. The cave is now open to public after restoration.

Vegetation grows thickly out of the vertical rock walls, mainly due to the water that one is able to find in the cracks and crevices that scale the cliff. Over the past several hundred years, the reports that the Meteora was easily accessible by foot have changed because now one must pass through an impenetrable jungle.

Being such massive unpredictable rock pillars, rock falls pose a constant threat to pilgrims and tourists of Meteora. An earthquake of magnitude 7 on the Richter Scale shook the rocks in 1954 but the thin pillars still stand today. In 2005, a massive rock fell, closing the access road leading up to Meteora for days.

== History ==
=== Archaeology ===
Theopetra Cave is located 4 kilometres (2.5 mi) from Kalambaka. Its uniqueness from an archeological perspective is that a single site contains records of two greatly significant cultural transitions: the replacement of Neanderthals by modern humans and later, the transition from hunting-gathering to farming after the end of the last Ice Age. The cave consists of an immense 500 square metres (5,400 sq ft) rectangular chamber at the foot of a limestone hill, which rises to the northeast above the village of Theopetra, with an entrance 17 metres (56 ft) wide by 3 metres (9.8 ft) high. It lies at the foot of the Chasia mountain range, which forms the natural boundary between Thessaly and Macedonia regions, while the Lithaios River, a tributary of the Pineios River, flows in front of the cave. The small Lithaios River flowing literally on the doorsteps of the cave meant that cave dwellers always had easy access to fresh, clean water without the need to cover daily long distances to find it.

=== Ancient history ===
Caves in the vicinity of Meteora were inhabited continuously between 50,000 and 5,000 years ago. The oldest known example of a built structure, a stone wall that blocked two-thirds of the entrance to the Theopetra cave, was constructed 23,000 years ago, probably as a barrier against cold winds (Earth was experiencing an ice age at the time), and many paleolithic and neolithic artifacts of human occupation have been found within the caves.

Meteora is not mentioned in classical Greek myths, nor in Ancient Greek literature. The first people who were documented to inhabit Meteora after the Neolithic Era were an ascetic group of hermit monks who, in the 800s CE, moved up to the ancient pinnacles. They lived in hollows and fissures in the rock towers, some of them as high as 550 metres (1,800 ft) above the plain. This great height, combined with the sheerness of the cliff walls, kept away all but the most determined visitors. Initially, the hermits led a life of solitude, meeting only on Sundays and special days, to worship and pray in a chapel built at the foot of a rock known as Dupiani.

As early as the 11th century, monks occupied the caverns of Meteora. However, monasteries were not built there until the 1300s, when the monks sought somewhere to hide in the face of an increasing number of attacks by the Turks upon Greece. At this time, access to the top was via removable ladders or hoisting ropes. Currently, getting up there is much simpler, due to steps having been carved-into the rock during the 1920s. Of the 24 monasteries, only six (four of men, two of women) are still functioning, with each housing fewer than ten individuals.

=== History and construction of the monasteries ===
The exact date of the establishment of the monasteries is widely believed to be unknown. However, there are clues to when each of the monasteries was constructed. By the late 11th century and early 1100s, a rudimentary monastic state had formed, called the Skete of Stagoi, and it was centered around the still-standing church of Theotokos (Mother of God). By the end of the 1100s, an ascetic community had flocked to Meteora.

In 1344, Athanasios Koinovitis from Mount Athos, later known as Athanasios the Meteorite, brought a group of followers to Meteora. From 1356 to 1372, he founded The Monastery of Great Meteoron on the Broad Rock. That location was perfect for the monks, because there, they were safe from political upheaval, and they had complete control of the entry to the monastery. The only means of reaching it was by climbing a long ladder, which was drawn-up whenever the monks thought that there was a threat to them. The creation of the monastic community at Meteora was protected and sponsored by the local lord Simeon Uroš, based in nearby Trikala, who in 1356 had proclaimed himself Emperor of Serbs and Greeks following the death of Stefan Dušan.

Simeon Uroš was succeeded in 1370 by his son John Uroš, who three years later retired as a monk to the Meteoron monastery and died there in the early 1420s. At the end of the 14th century, Christian rule over northern Greece was being increasingly threatened by Turkish raiders who wanted control over the fertile plain of Thessaly, which they finally secured in the second half of the 15th century. The hermit monks, seeking a retreat from the expanding Ottoman Empire, found the inaccessible rock pillars of Meteora to be an ideal refuge. More than 20 monasteries were built, of which six remain today. In 1517, Theophanes built the monastery of Varlaam, which was reputed to house the finger of St. John and the shoulder blade of St. Andrew.

Access to the monasteries was originally (and deliberately) difficult, requiring either long ladders that were latched together, or large nets that were used to haul up both goods and people. This required quite a leap of faith, because the ropes were replaced, so the story goes, only "when the Lord let them break". In the words of UNESCO: "The net in which intrepid pilgrims were hoisted up vertically alongside the 373-metre (1,224 ft) cliff where the Varlaam monastery dominates the valley symbolizes the fragility of a traditional way of life that is threatened with extinction."

Until the 1600s, the primary means of conveying goods and people from these high places was by means of baskets and ropes.

Under the 1881 Convention of Constantinople, Thessaly was taken-over by the Kingdom of Greece. In 1921, Queen Marie of Romania visited Meteora, becoming the first woman ever allowed to enter the Great Meteoron monastery.

In the 1920s, there was an improvement in the arrangements: Steps were cut into the rock, making the complex accessible via a bridge from the nearby plateau. During World War II, the site was bombed.

== The monasteries of Meteora ==
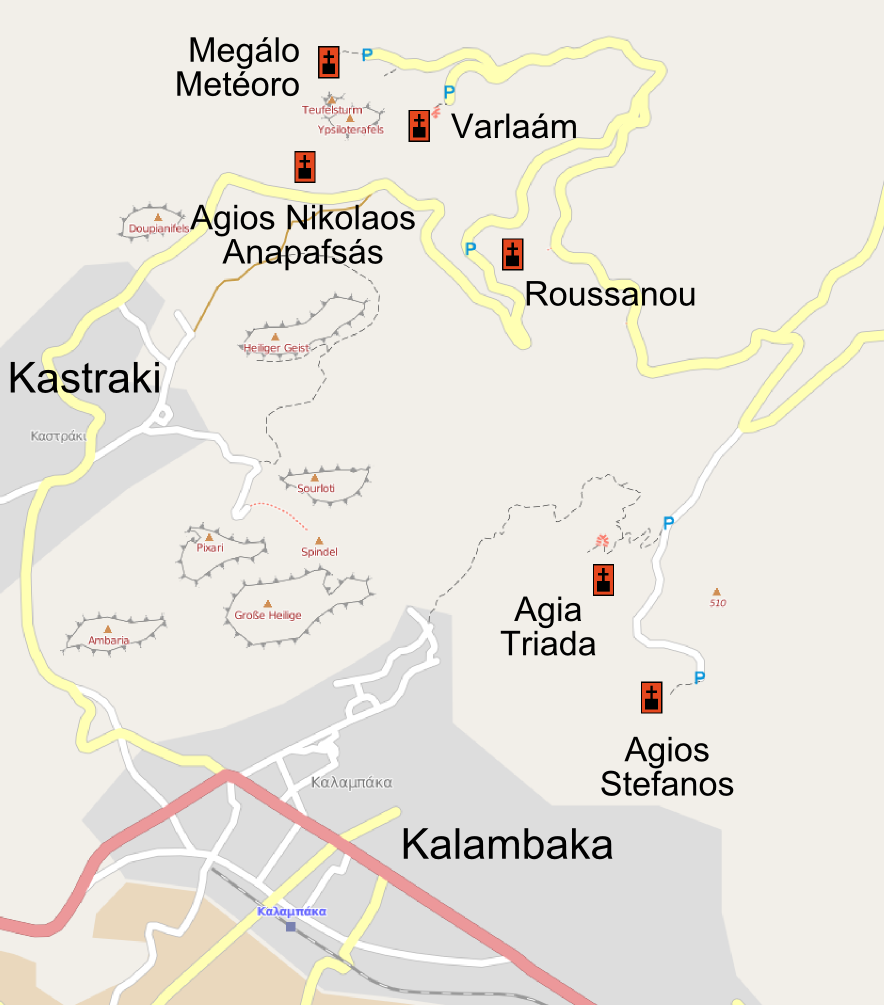
Map of Meteora, with the six extant monasteries, as marked

At their peak in the 16th century, there were 24 monasteries at Meteora in Greece. They were created to serve monks and nuns following the teachings of the Eastern Orthodox Church. Much of the architecture of these buildings is Athonite in origin. Today there are six extant, of which four operate as monasteries, while the remainder are largely in ruin. Perched onto high cliffs, they are now accessible by staircases and pathways cut into the rock formations.

=== Extant monasteries ===
The following monasteries comprise the UNESCO World Heritage Site.

==== The Great Meteoron ====
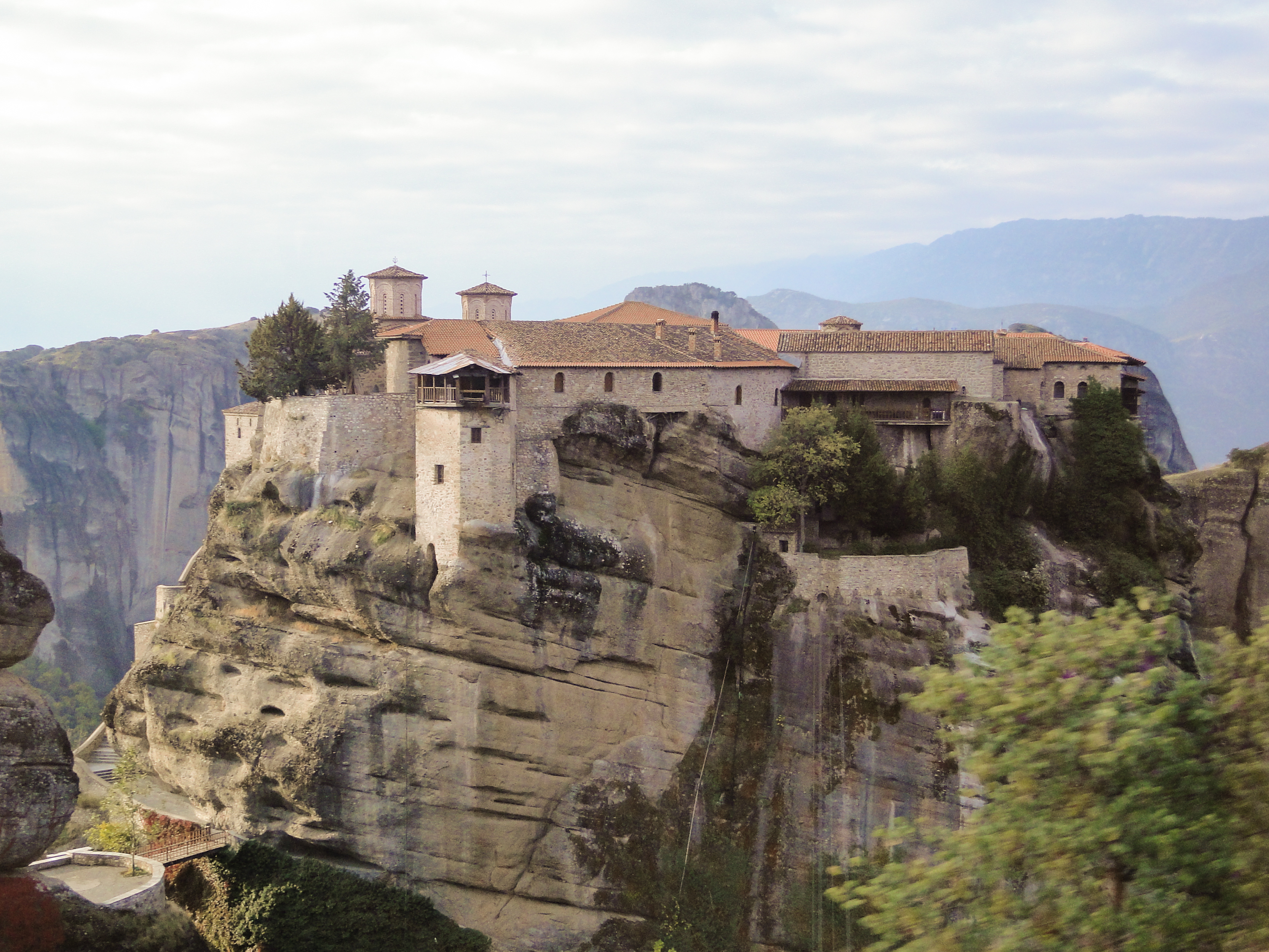
The Great Meteoron

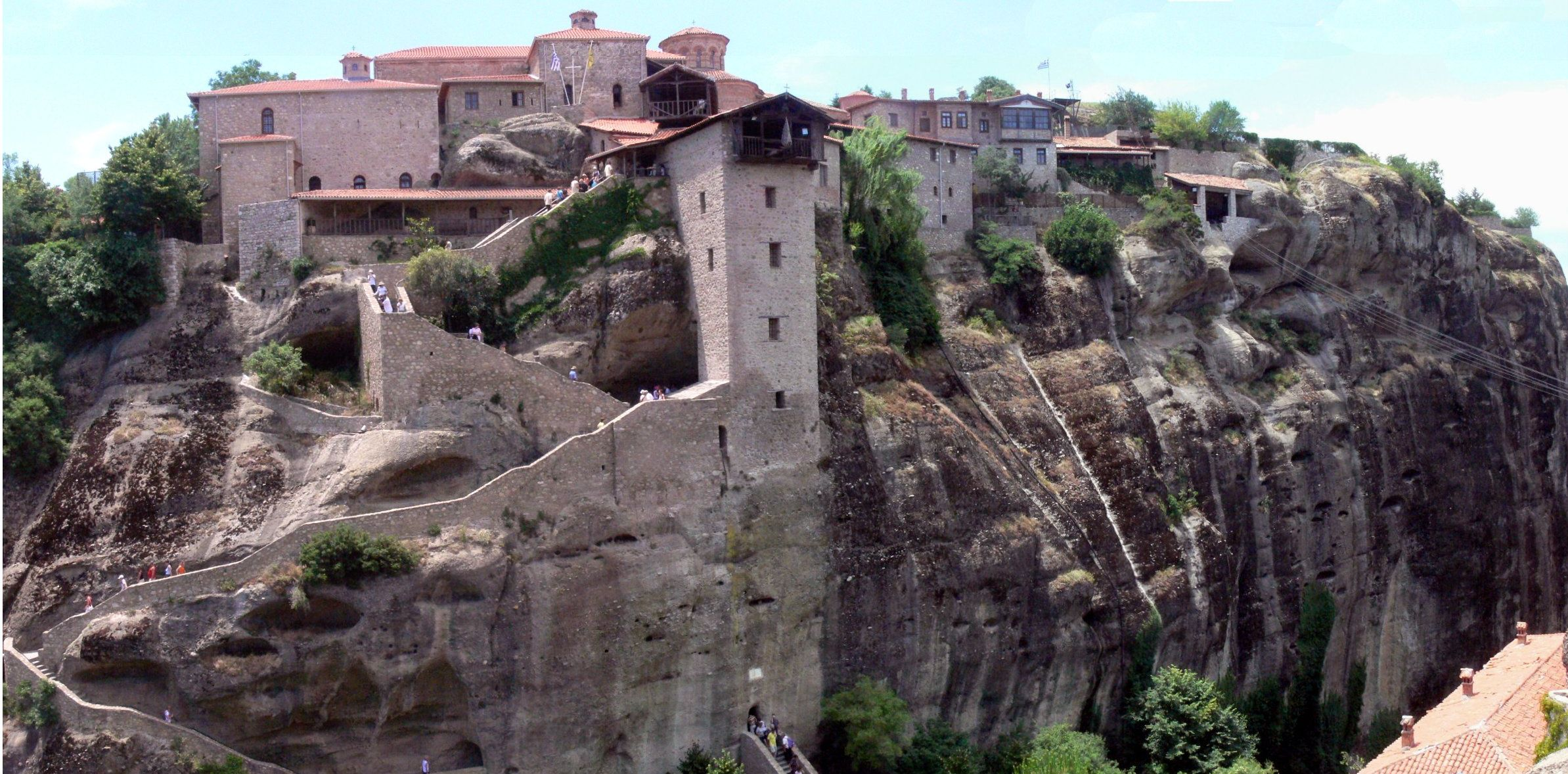
Another view of the monastery

The Holy Monastery of Great Meteoron (Greek: της Μεταμόρφωσης, romanized: Metamorfoses) is the oldest and largest of the monasteries of Meteora. The monastery is believed to have been built just before the mid-14th century by a monk from Mount Athos named Saint Athanasios the Meteorite. He began the build with a church in dedication to the Mother of God, the Virgin Mary. He later added small cells so that monks could concentrate and live atop the rock formations. The monastery's second name is, The Holy Monastery of the Transfiguration, which got its name from the second church St. Meteorites built. The successor of Saint Athanasios was Saint Joasaph, who continued to build more cells, a hospital, and renovated the churches atop the rocks. The Monastery thrived in the 16th century when it received many imperial and royal donations. At the time it had over three hundred monks living and worshipping within its cells. It is still a living monastery as there were three monks in residence as of 2015.

Being the largest among all the monasteries allows it to have a particular layout filled with many buildings. The katholikon is dedicated to the Transfiguration of Jesus and was the first church of the monastery. The hermitage of the first founder of the monastery is a small building carved in rock. The kitchen or what is commonly referred to as the hestia is a dome-shaped building near the refectory. There is also a hospital, with its famous roof of the ground floor made of brick and supported on four columns. The three old churches or chapels include: The Chapel of Saint John the Baptist which lies next to the katholikon sanctuary, The Saints Constantine and Helen Chapel which is an aisle-less church with large vault, and finally the chapel of Virgin Mary situated in the cave.

==== Varlaam ====
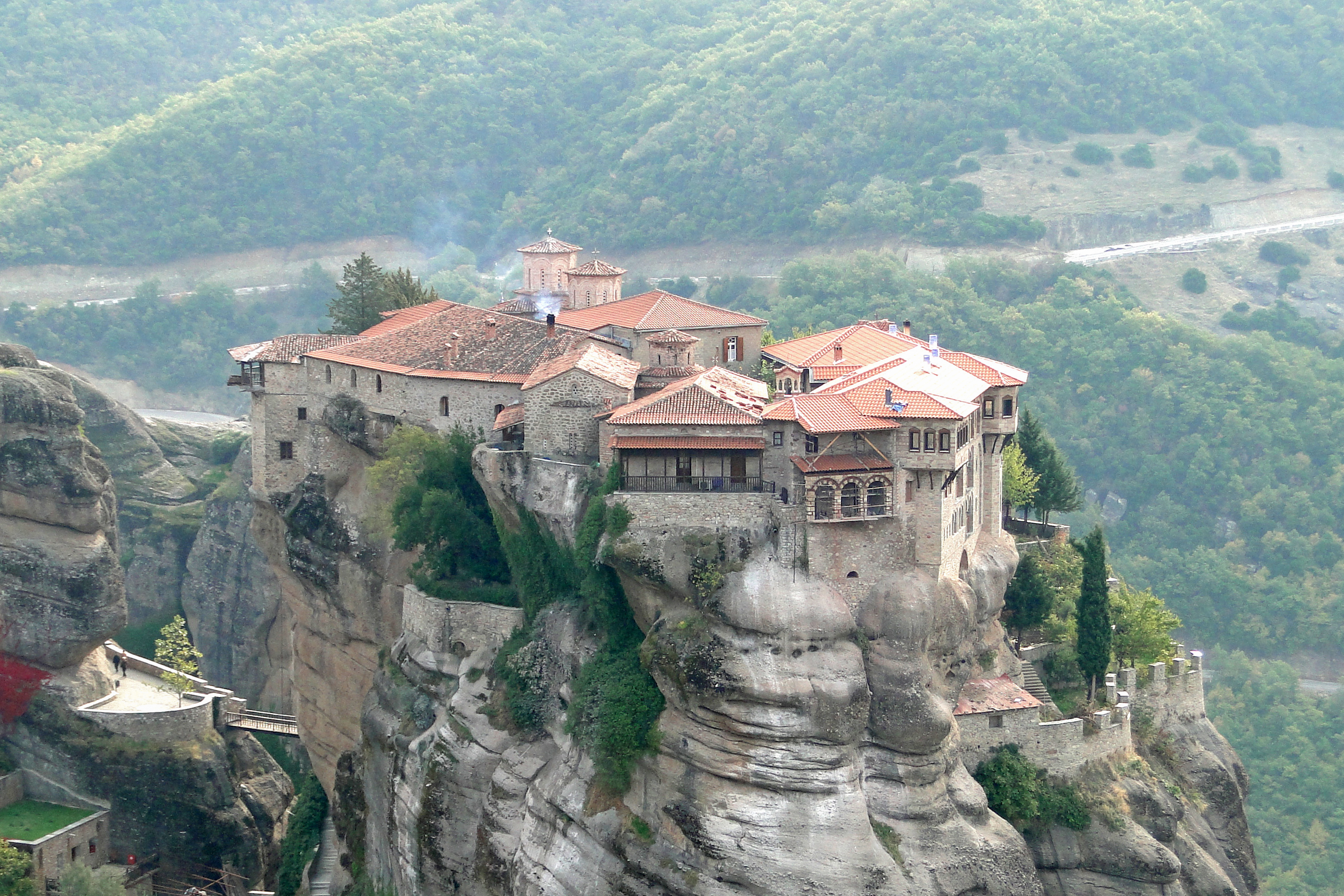
The Monastery of Varlaam

The Monastery of Varlaam (Greek: Βαρλαάμ; also known as Greek: Αγίων Πάντων, romanized: Agion Panton, lit. 'All Saints') is the second largest monastery of Meteora. The name Varlaam comes from a monk named Varlaam who scaled the rocks in 1350 and began construction on the monasteries. Varlaam built three churches by hoisting materials up the face of the cliffs. After Varlaam's death, the monastery was abandoned for two hundred years until two monk brothers, Theophanes and Nektarios Apsarades, came to the rock in the 16th century and began to rebuild the churches in October 1517. The two brothers from Ioannina spent twenty-two years hoisting materials to the top of the rock formation, however, the building only is reported to have taken around twenty days. Monks have been present since the 16th century, however, there has been a constant decline in their presence since the 17th century. Today the monastery is accessed through a series of ladders that scale the north side of the rock. The museum is open to travelers and contains a wide array of relics and ecclesiastical treasures. As of 2015 there are seven monks remaining in Varlaam.

==== Rousanou ====
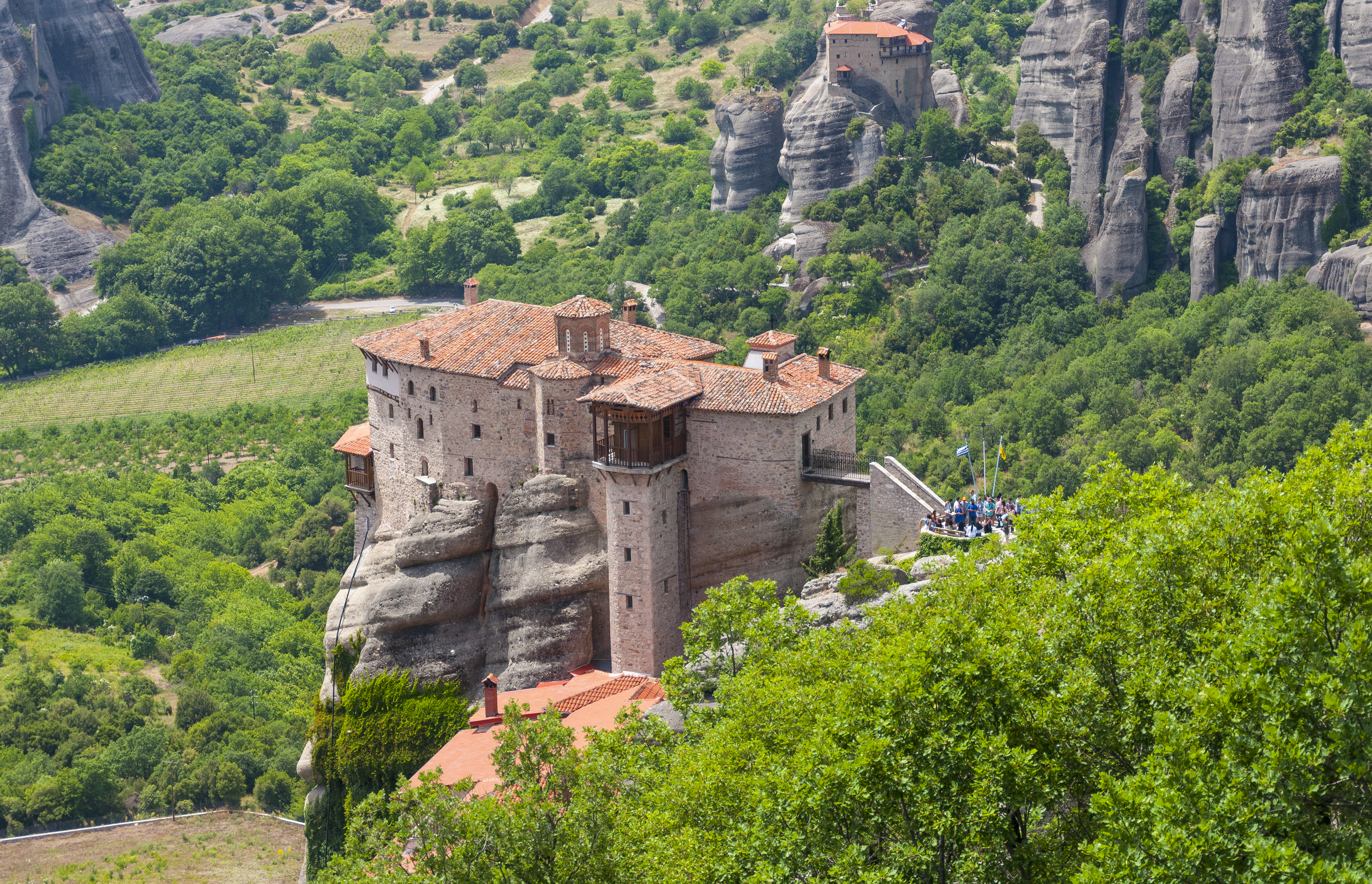
The Monastery of Rousanou located atop the rock structures

The Monastery of Rousanou (Greek: Ρουσάνου, romanized: Rousanou; also Greek: Αρσάνου, romanized: Arsanou) is believed to have been constructed, like many of the other monasteries, in the 14th century. The cathedral is believed to have been built in the 16th century and later decorated in 1540. The name Rousanou is believed to come from the first group of monks who settled on the rock from Russia. The monastery is 484 metres (1,588 ft) above sea level. Lying in the middle of the site, visitors can see the other monasteries, as well as the ruins of the Monastery of St. John the Baptist and the Pantokrator.

==== St. Nicholas Anapausas ====
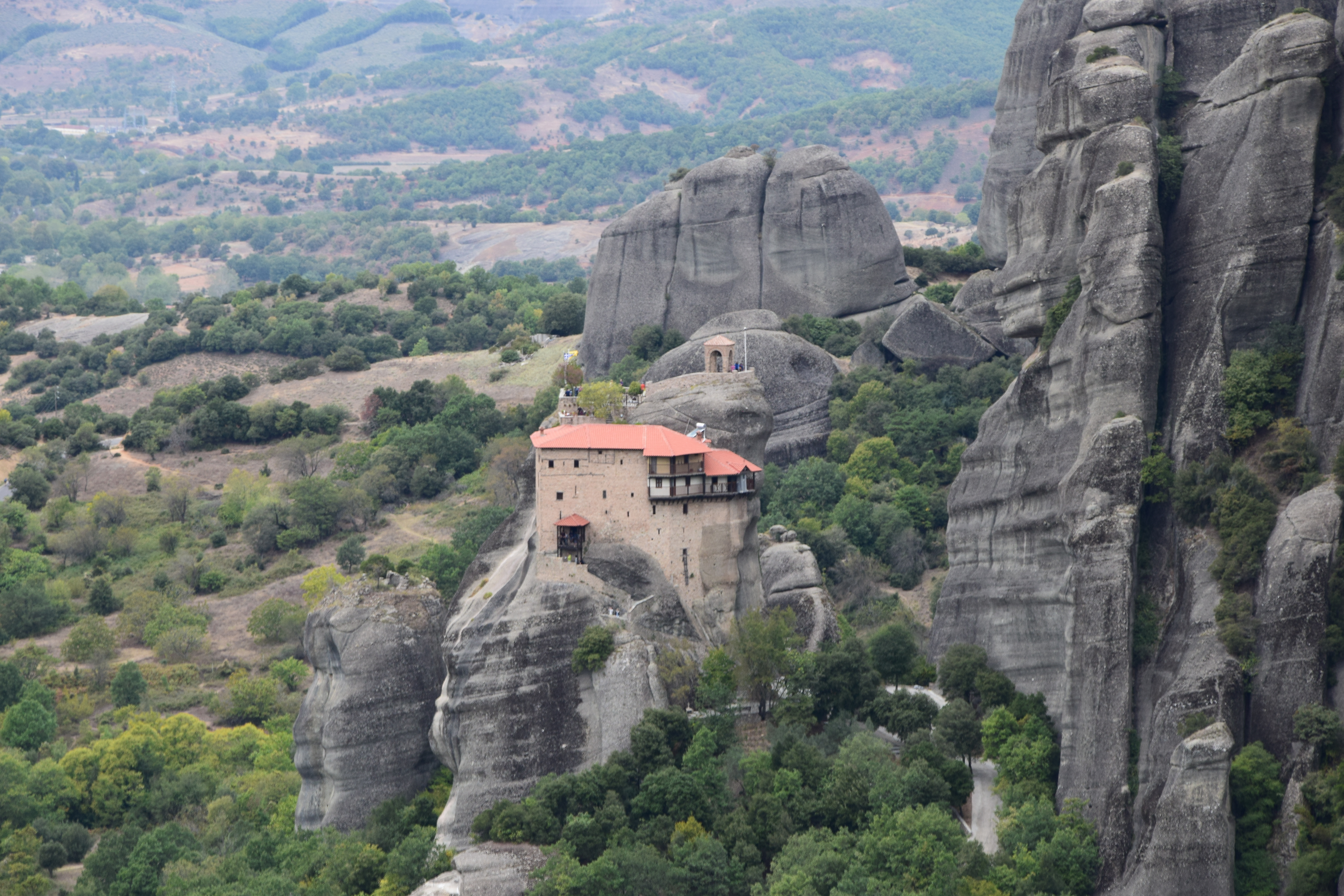
The Monastery of St. Nicholas Anapausas

The Monastery of St. Nicholas Anapausas (Greek: Αγίου Νικολάου Αναπαυσά, romanized: Agiou Nikolaou Anapausa) is located atop a small narrow rock. It is approximately eighty meters high and the first which the pilgrims encounter on their way to the holy Meteora. The Monastery was founded in the late 14th century and today is surrounded by the deserted and ruined monasteries of St. John Prodromos, the Pantocrator, and the chapel of Panagia Doupiani. The monastery served as a resting place for pilgrims and quickly got its name of Anapausas (modern pronunciation anapafseos), 'resting'. Being on such a narrow surface, the floors are connected through an interior staircase. St. Nicholas is honored on the second floor where the katholikon is located. On the third floor, there is the Holy Table and the walls are decorated by 14th-century frescoes. The monastery has been restored in the 16th century and again in the 1960s.

==== Holy Trinity ====
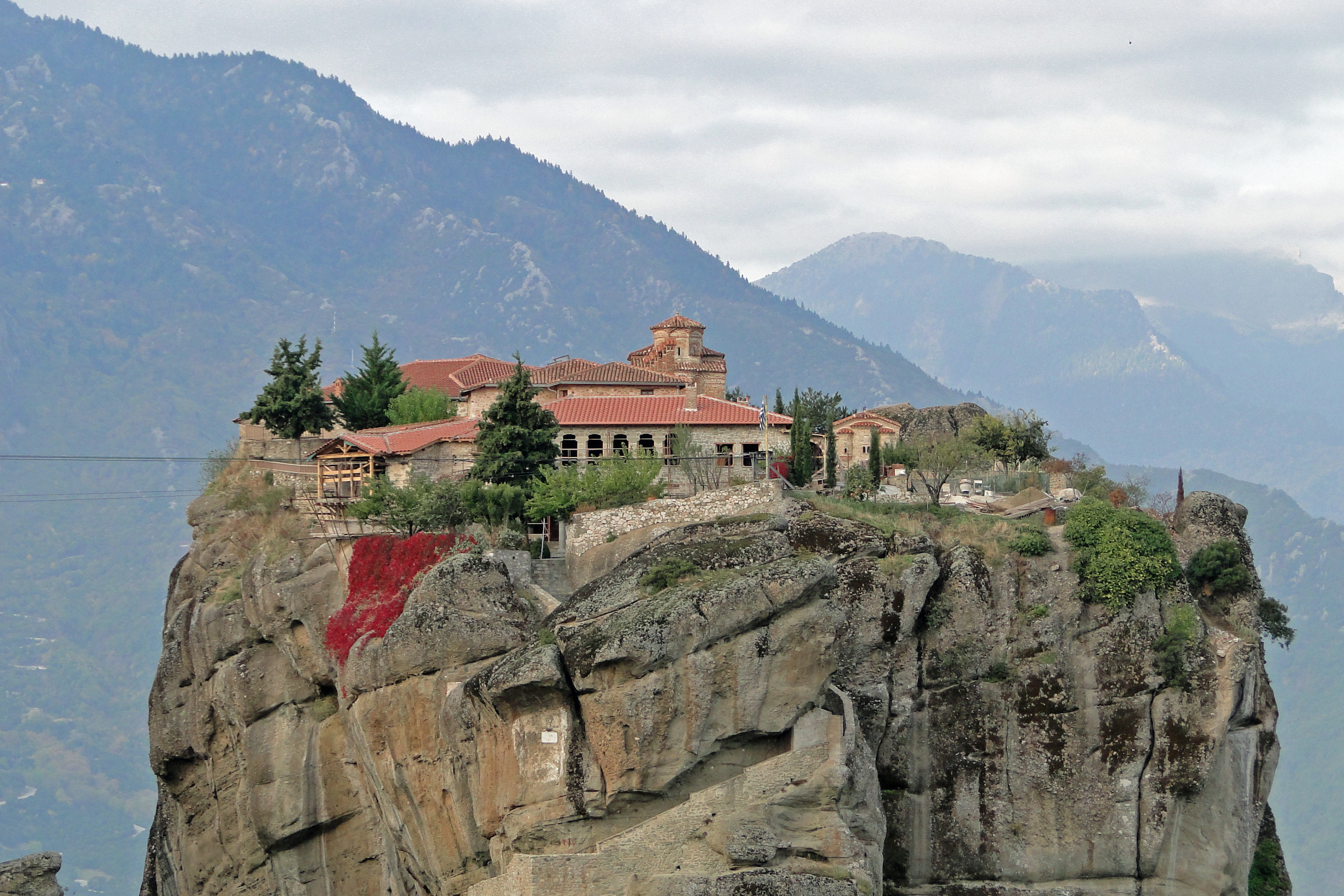
The Monastery of The Holy Trinity

The Monastery of the Holy Trinity (Greek: Αγίας Τριάδος, romanized: Agias Triados) is believed to have been built in the 14th and 15th century. Even prior to this, ancient Greeks established hermitages at the base of the rock cliffs. In the 14th century, John Uroš moved to the Meteora and endowed and built monasteries on top of the rock cliffs. He offered the sanctuaries as a safe haven during times of political upheaval. The monk Dometius was said to be the founder of the monastery, arriving at the site of Holy Trinity in 1438. The actual monastery is believed to have been built between 1475 and 1476. Some do say that the exact construction date of the monastery like many of the other monasteries is unknown. By the end of the 16th century this was one of the last six monasteries still atop the Meteora.

==== St. Stephen ====
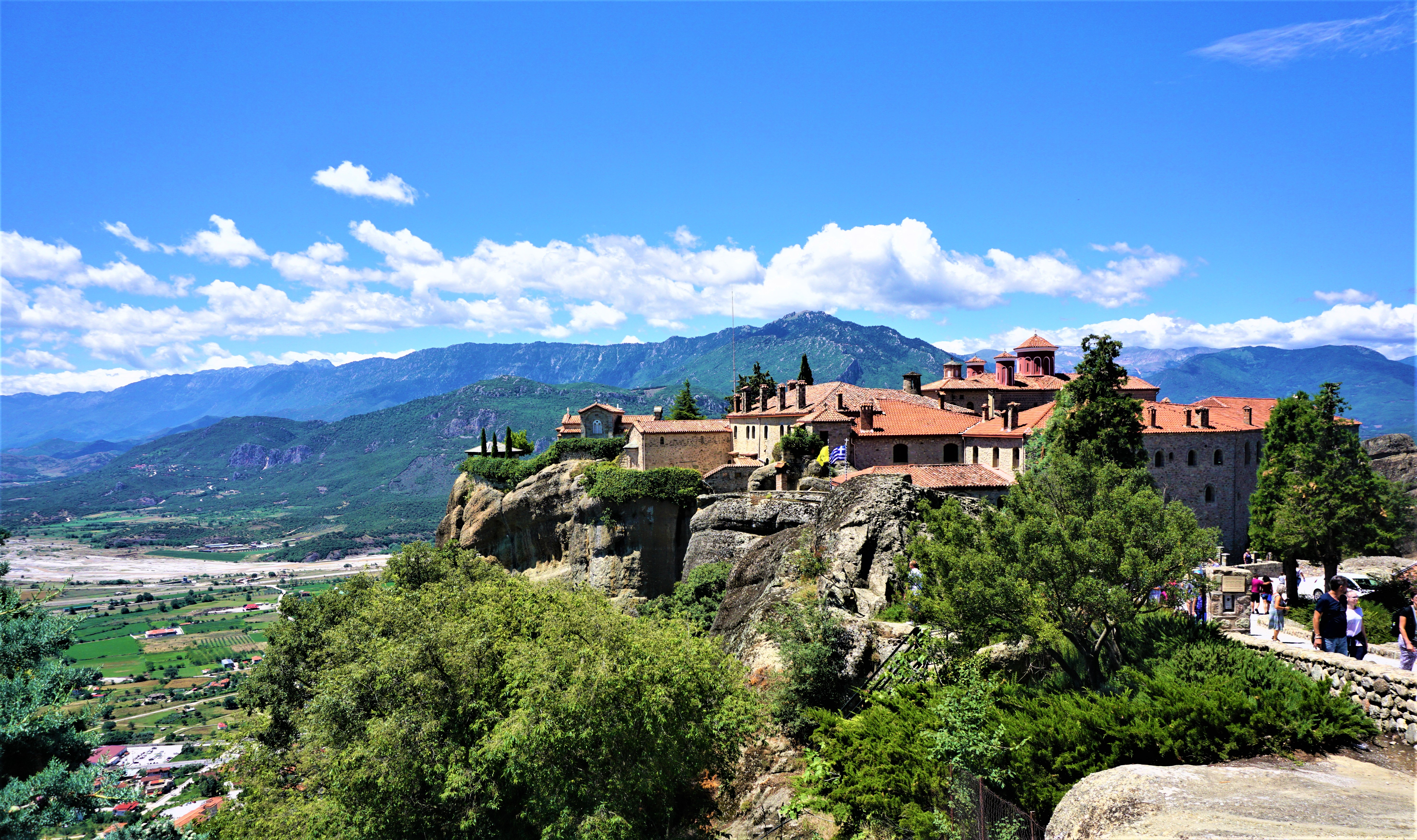
The Monastery of St. Stephen

The Monastery of St. Stephen (Greek: Αγίου Στεφάνου, romanized: Agiou Stefanou) is located on a plateau-like structure. The original monastery was believed to have been built in the 14th century, however, a new katholikon was built in 1798 making it the newest of all the meteorite structures. The monastery is made up of many buildings including new katholikon, the "hestia" (kitchen), an old refectory that has since become a museum, and an assortment of rooms with different purposes. These include workrooms for paintings, embroidery, incense-making, and needlework. The church's interior was decorated with frescoes on the inside for a short period after 1545. However, during the World wars, the monasteries were bombed heavily and ransacked in the belief that the monks were holding refugees. As of 2015, the Monastery of St. Stephen is home to 28 nuns after its conversion to a nunnery in 1961.

=== Other monasteries ===
In addition to the above six extant monasteries, the remaining eighteen historic monasteries of Meteora are listed as follows. Coordinates are also given for some sites. The list is primarily sourced from Vlioras (2017), with some additional notes from Provatakis (2006).

English	Greek transliteration	Greek script	Notes	Image
St. Anthony	Agiou Antoniou	Αγίου Αντωνίου	Built around the 14th century, only a small church has survived from the monastery (39.712166°N 21.621643°E), on the south side of Pyxari Rock.	
St. Dimitrios	Agiou Dimitriou	Αγίου Δημητρίου	Destroyed by Ali Pasha Tepelena in 1809 since Greek insurgents led by Thymios Vlachavas had set up their headquarters in the monastery. Ruins (39.7332099°N 21.6310140°E) on Dimitrios Rock above Ypapantis Monastery.	
St. George of Mandila	Agiou Georgiou tou Mandela	Αγίου Γεωργίου του Μανδηλά	Ruins at the Holy Spirit (Agion Pnefma) Rock (39.718336°N 21.622516°E). Kerchiefs (mandilia) are traditionally hung at the cave entrance. The cave is 15 metres long and 4–5 metres deep at its center, and is located approx. 30 m (98 ft) aboveground. It may have been one of the four monasteries founded around 1367 by Neilos, the Prior of the Skete of Stagoi. The Cave of St. George of Mandila may be the same as the Cave of Archimandrite Makarios near Pigadion.	
St. Gregory	Agiou Gregoriou	Αγίου Γρηγορίου	Founded in the 14th century. Ruins (39.712271°N 21.621536°E) on Pyxari Rock.	
Holy Apostles	Agion Apostolon	Αγίων Αποστόλων	Ruins have been preserved (39.711703°N 21.625157°E). Founded in the early 16th century (perhaps by the monk Kallistos) and documented in 1551. Only ruins, murals, carved stairs, and a cistern remain. Located on Agia Rock at the southern edge of the Meteora rock complex. Full Greek name: Ιερά Μονή Αγίων Αποστόλων (Αϊά).	
Holy Archangels	Agion Taxiarchon	Αγίων Ταξιαρχών	Monastery ruins (39.717067°N 21.635697°E) on Archangel (Taxiarchon) Rock (Βράχος Ταξιαρχών).	
Holy Monastery	Agias Mones	Αγίας Μονής	The monastery was mentioned in 1614, which at the time was inhabited by more than 20 monks. Ruins (39.723969°N 21.627943°E) in the Sterna area near Ypsilotera Monastery. The monastery had also sought to gain recognition as a stavropegion.	
St. John of Bunilas	Ioannou tou Bounela	Ιωάννου του Μπουνήλα	Ruins of monastery walls in an area called Bunila, known as Palaiomonastiro (Παλαιομονάστηρο).	
St. John the Baptist	Agiou Ioanne Prodromou	Αγίου Ιωάννη Προδρόμου	Founded in the mid-17th century. Ruins (39.723732°N 21.624006°E) located on a rock directly adjacent to the Monastery of St. Nicholas Anapausas. The rock on which the monastery was built was the residence of Athanasius the Meteorite. Theophanes and Nektarios Apsarades, the founders of the Monastery of Varlaam, also lived on the rock for seven years before they built Varlaam.	
Kallistratou	Kallistratou	Καλλιστράτου	Exact location uncertain. In the general area of the Monastery of St. Nicholas Anapausas and Monastery of Rousanou. Also known as the Monastery of Christ the Savior (Μονὴ Σωτῆρος Χριστοῦ, Moni Sotiros Christou).	
St. Modestus	Agiou Modestou	Αγίου Μοδέστου	Built around the 12th century. First mentioned in a 12th-century letter. Also mentioned in 1614. Ruins (39.714796°N 21.629437°E) on Modesto (Modi) Rock (rock on the right in the photo).	
St. Nicholas of Badova / (Nikolaus Kofina)	Agiou Nikolaou tou Bantova / (Agiou Nikolaou Kofina)	Αγίου Νικολάου του Μπάντοβα / (Αγίου Νικολάου Κοφινά)	Founded c. 1400 in a rock cave on Badovas Rock. Not preserved, since in 1943 it was bombed and destroyed by the Germans. Ruins (39.710731°N 21.622125°E), which can be reached via a series of ladders passing through three caves, located at the southwestern edge of the Meteora rock complex.	
Panagia of Mikani / (Paleopanagia)	Panagias tes Mekanes / (Palaiopanagia)	Παναγίας της Μήκανης / (Παλαιοπαναγιά)	Founded in 1358 in a rock cave (39°48′8″N 21°40′42″E). 7 km north of Vlachava village, near the Ion (or Mikani) River, a tributary of the Pineios. It can be reached via a dirt road that goes out to the northeast from the village center of Vlachava. A carved staircase leads up to the rock cave. Elevation: about 600 m. Also, directly behind it lies Kallistra Rock (βράχος Καλλίστρα), the site of the ruins of the Monastery of St. Kallistos (Μονή Αγίων Αποστόλων Καλλίστου), which is also called the Monastery of the Holy Apostles (Μονή των Αγίων Αποστόλων).	
Pantocrator	Pantokratora	Παντοκράτορα	Mentioned in documents from 1650. Ruins (39.722293°N 21.621406°E) at the Dupiani area. It is located about 30 metres above the ground.	
Apostle Peter's Chains	Alyseos Apostolou Petrou	Αλύσεως Αποστόλου Πέτρου	Probably built around 1400. Ruins (39.712752°N 21.629524°E) on Alysos (Άλσος) Rock.	Altsos Rock
St. Theodore	Agion Theodoron	Αγίων Θεοδώρων	Ruins (39.663677°N 21.694746°E) located near Theopetra Cave, southeast of Kalabaka town.	
Ypapantis	Ypapantes	Υπαπαντής	Founded in 1367 by the Prior/Abbot of the Skete of Dupiani. In 1765, it was restored by Athanasios Vlachavas, a local leader. Today, Ypapantis Monastery (literally "Monastery of the Presentation of Jesus") is inactive and rarely visited, although the building (39.733470°N 21.630868°E) has been restored. The interior of the building is usually closed to visitors. Accessible by footpaths, one of which passes by Ftelias (Φτελιάς) Rock.	
Ypsilotera / (Kalligrafon)	Mones Ypseloteras / (Kalligrafon)	Μονής Υψηλωτέρας / (Καλλιγράφων)	The monastery was famous for its manuscripts and calligraphers. Founded in 1347 by Paschalis of Kalambaka. Ruins (39.725090°N 21.627798°E) located on Ypsilotera Rock (585.7 m) next to the "Devil's Tower", a geological rock formation that is between the Monastery of St. Nicholas Anapausas and Monastery of Varlaam. In the photo to the right, Ypsilotera is the free-standing dome-shaped rock on the left, covered with vegetation on top.	

Other sites (sketes, hermitages, rocks, etc.) include:

Site	Notes	Image
Dupiani (Δούπιανη)	Rock with the first monastery (or Skete of the Holy Virgin of Dupiani), also known as the Panagia Parthénos Kyriákou Monastery (39.721072°N 21.619516°E), founded in Meteora, and also the name of the rock on which it is built. The original monastery itself has not survived. The early 13th-century chapel built on this site is still in use and maintained. Renovations took place in 1867 and 1974. Located on the north side of Kastraki village. The Monastery of St. Dimitrios of Dupiani (39.722322°N 21.621405°E) at Dupiani is not to be confused with the Monastery of St. Dimitrios adjacent to Ypapantis Monastery.	
Agiou Pneuma ("Holy Spirit"; Greek: Αγίου Πνεύματος, romanized: Agiou Pneumatos)	Rock monastery with ruins (39.718285°N 21.625010°E) connected by a narrow rock-carved path. Preserved sarcophagus, monastic cells, two cisterns, and a rock-carved altar and shrine.	
Monks' Prison (Filakaé Monakón)	The Monks' Prison (39.720162°N 21.627118°E) is perched on a rock cliff on the Agion Pneuma Rock. It may be the same as the Cave of Neophytos, the founder of the St. Dimitrios and Pantokrator monasteries on Dupiani Rock. Also known as Oglas (Ογλάς) or the Nuns' Prison (Φυλακές των Καλογέρων, Fylakes ton Kalogeron).	
Hermitage of St. Athanasius of Meteora (Greek: Άγιος Αθανάσιος)	Ruins of a hermitage on the Holy Spirit Rock said to be inhabited by St. Athanasios the Meteorite (Ἀθανάσιος ὁ Μετεωρίτης) (39.717172°N 21.622431°E). The Cave of St. Athanasius of Meteora (39.724027°N 21.627965°E) is next to the Holy Monastery.	
Pyxari (Πυξάρι)	Rock with cave hermitages perched on cliffs, formerly inhabited by ascetics. Located at the southwestern edge of the Meteora rock complex.	
Ambaria (Αμπάρια)	Rock with cave hermitages perched on cliffs, formerly inhabited by ascetics. Located at the southwestern edge of the Meteora rock complex.	
Monastery of St. Eustratius (Moni Agios Efstratios, Μονή Αγίου Ευστρατίου)	Little-known monastery on Surloti Rock (βράχου Σουρλωτή).	Surloti Rock
Staircase of St. Eustratius	The Staircase of St. Eustratius (39.717349°N 21.634427°E) is located on the eastern side of St. Eustratios Rock. There are a few different stairways carved into the rock.	
Monastery of Theostiriktos (Μονή Θεοστηρίκτου)	Location uncertain. In the general area of Stylos Stagios (βράχου Στύλος Σταγών) / Agion Pneuma Rock.	
Cell of Constantius (Κελί του Κωνστάντιου)	Northeast of Pyxari Rock in a forested valley (39.7142225°N 21.6249977°E). Also called the Panagia Hermitage (Ασκητήριο της Παναγίας), Panagia Chapel (Ναός της Παναγίας), or Trani Church (Τρανή Εκκλησιά).	
Monastery of St. Nicholas of Petra (Μονή Αγίου Νικολάου της Πέτρας)	Ruins (39.710824°N 21.621164°E) on Badovas / Bantova Rock, just to the west of the monastery of St. Nicholas of Badova. Also known as the Monastery of St. Nicholas of Skala (Αγίου Νικολάου της Σκάλας).	
Kelarakia (Κελαράκια)	Ruins (39.72514°N 21.63241°E) on a rock directly to the east of the Monastery of Varlaam. The Cell of St. Paul the Apostle (Κελί του Αγίου Αποστόλου Παύλου) can probably be identified with Kelarakia. The Plakes (Πλάκες) area, a valley with various rocks, is located just south of Kelarakia.	
Monastery of the Three Hierarchs (Μονή των Τριών Ιεραρχών)	Somewhere to the east of Kastraki. Exact location unknown.	

== List of rocks ==
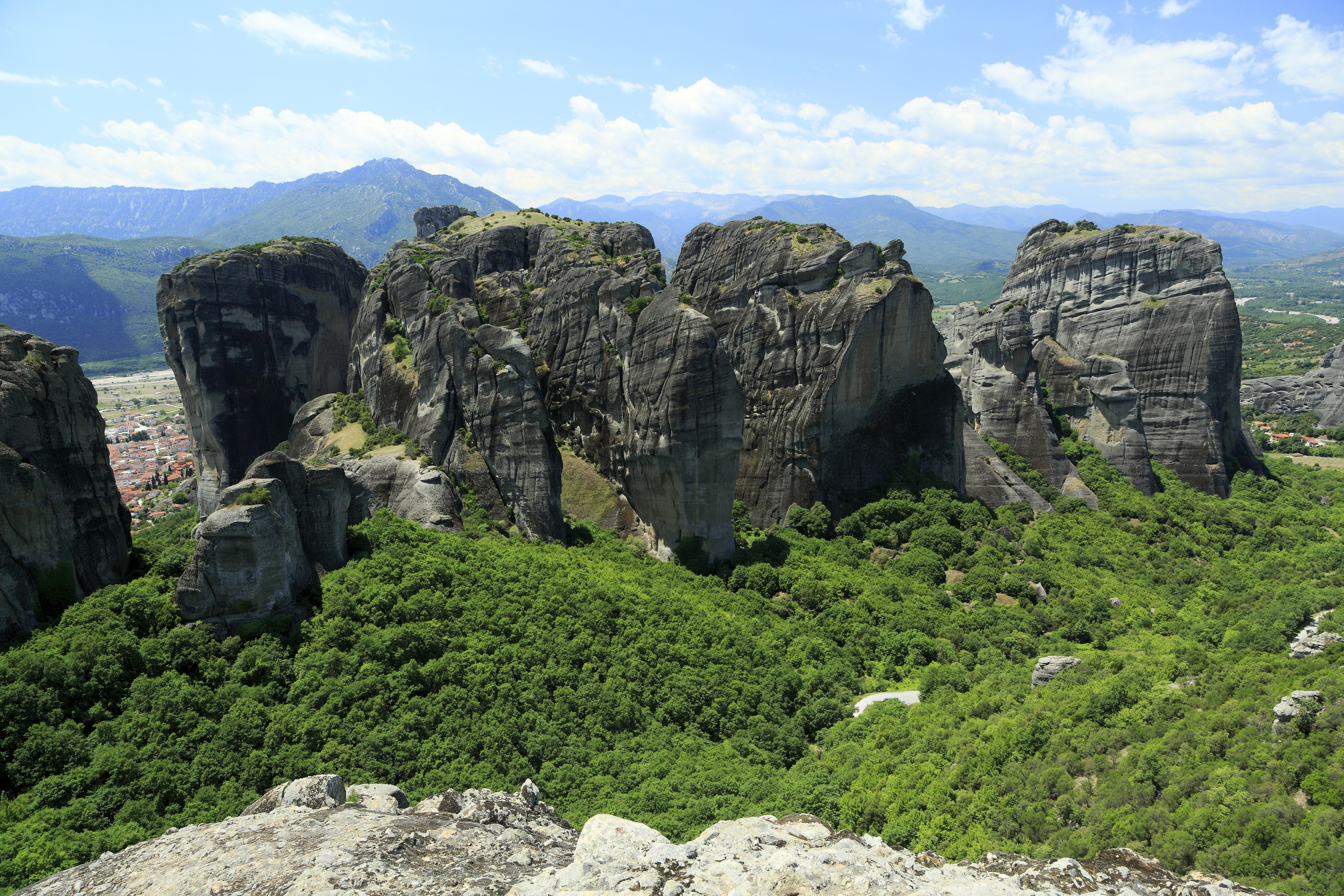
The Alpha, Beta, and Gamma Rocks of Meteora

There are various rocks of Meteora that surround the village of Kastraki and border the north side of the main town of Kalabaka.

Site	Greek script	Elevation		Notes
Site	Greek script	m	ft	Notes
Adrachti	Αδράχτι	474	1,555	
Agia / Megali Agia	Αγιά	630	2,070	Literally, "Large Aya"; site of the historic Monastery of St. Apostoles (Μονή Αγίων Αποστόλων).
Agio Pneuma	Άγιο Πνεύμα	600	2,000	Site of the historic Monastery of St. George of Mandila and Monks' Prison
Alysos / Altsos / Alsos	Άλυσος / Άλτσος / Άλσος	587.8	1,928	Site of the historic Monastery of the Apostle Peter's Chains
Ambaria	Αμπάρια	400	1,300	
Archangel	Ταξιαρχών			
Badovas	Μπάντοβας	447.3	1,468	Site of the historic Monastery of St. Nicholas of Badovas
Chalasma	Χάλασμα			
St. Dimitrios	Αγίου Δημητρίου			Site of the Monastery of St. Dimitrios and Ypapantis Monastery
Dupiani	Δούπιανη	390	1,280	
St. Eustratius	Αγίου Ευστρατίου			
Ftelias	Φτελιάς			
Kelarakia	Κελαράκια			
Kumaries	Κουμαριές	497	1,631	
Marmaro	Μάρμαρο			Literally, "marble"; traversed by a paved road that connects Kastraki with Kalabaka
Mikri Agia	Μικρή Αγιά			Literally, "Small Aya"
Modi	Μόδι	584.5	1,918	Site of the historic Monastery of St. Modestus
Psaropetra				Literally, "Fish Rock"; now a viewpoint on the main road that is popular with tourists
Pyxari	Πυξάρι	523.9	1,719	Site of the historic Hermitage of Saint Gregory the Theologian (Ασκηταριά Αγίου Γρηγορίου του Θεολόγου), Monastery of St. Anthony, and Monastery of Chrysostomos
Surloti	Σουρλωτή	600	2,000	
Toichos Alpha (Kafkasia)	Τοίχος Α	480	1,570	
Toichos Beta (Sfika)	Τοίχος Β	528	1,732	
Toichos Gamma (Palaiokranies)	Τοίχος Γ	540	1,770	
Toichos Delta (Lianomodia)	Τοίχος Δ	531	1,742	

The greater Meteora rock formation also extends northwest into the Gavros and Agios Dimitrios areas, although the term Meteora is commonly used to refer to only the rocks around Kalabaka and Kastraki.

== Gallery ==
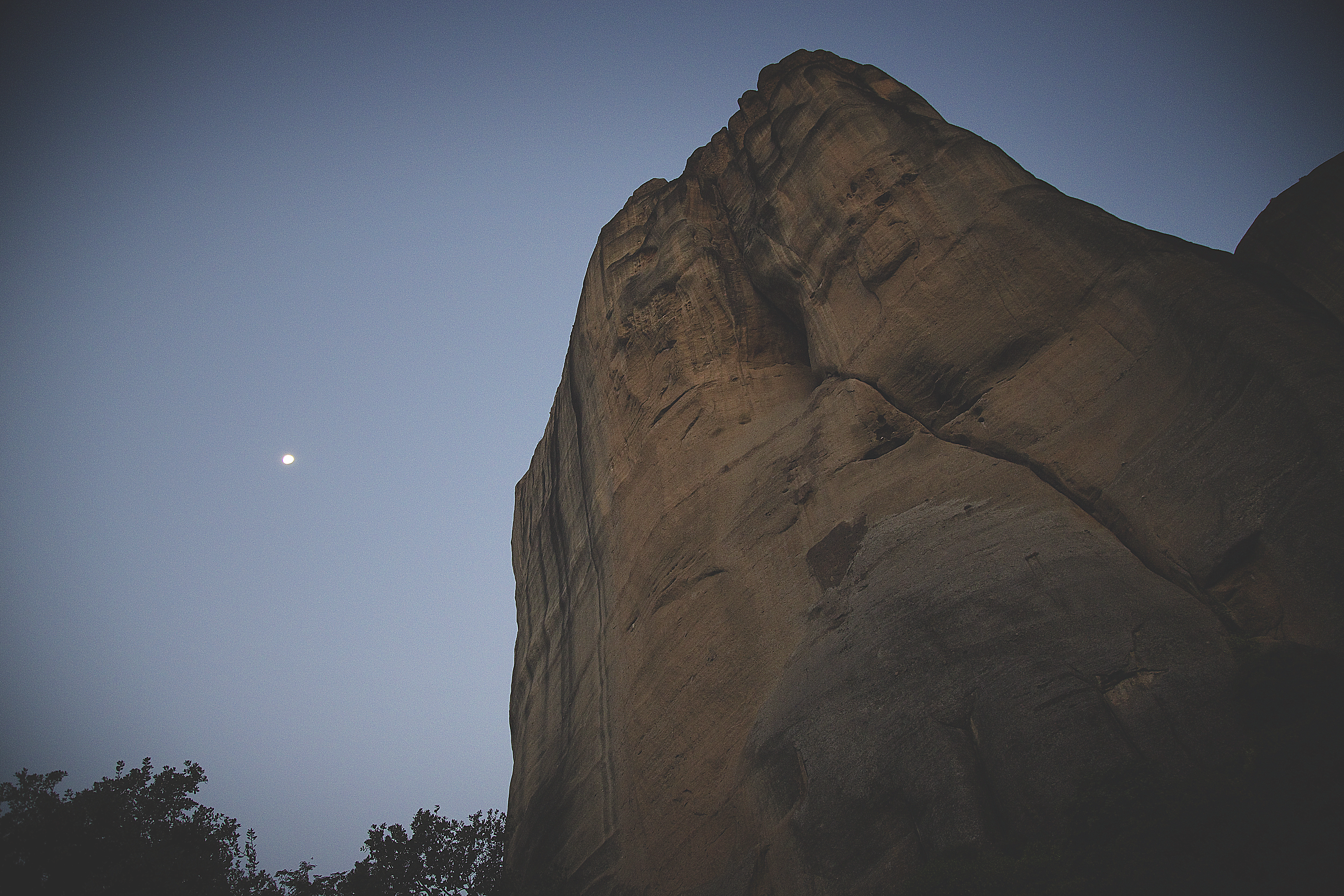
Meteora in the early morning hours

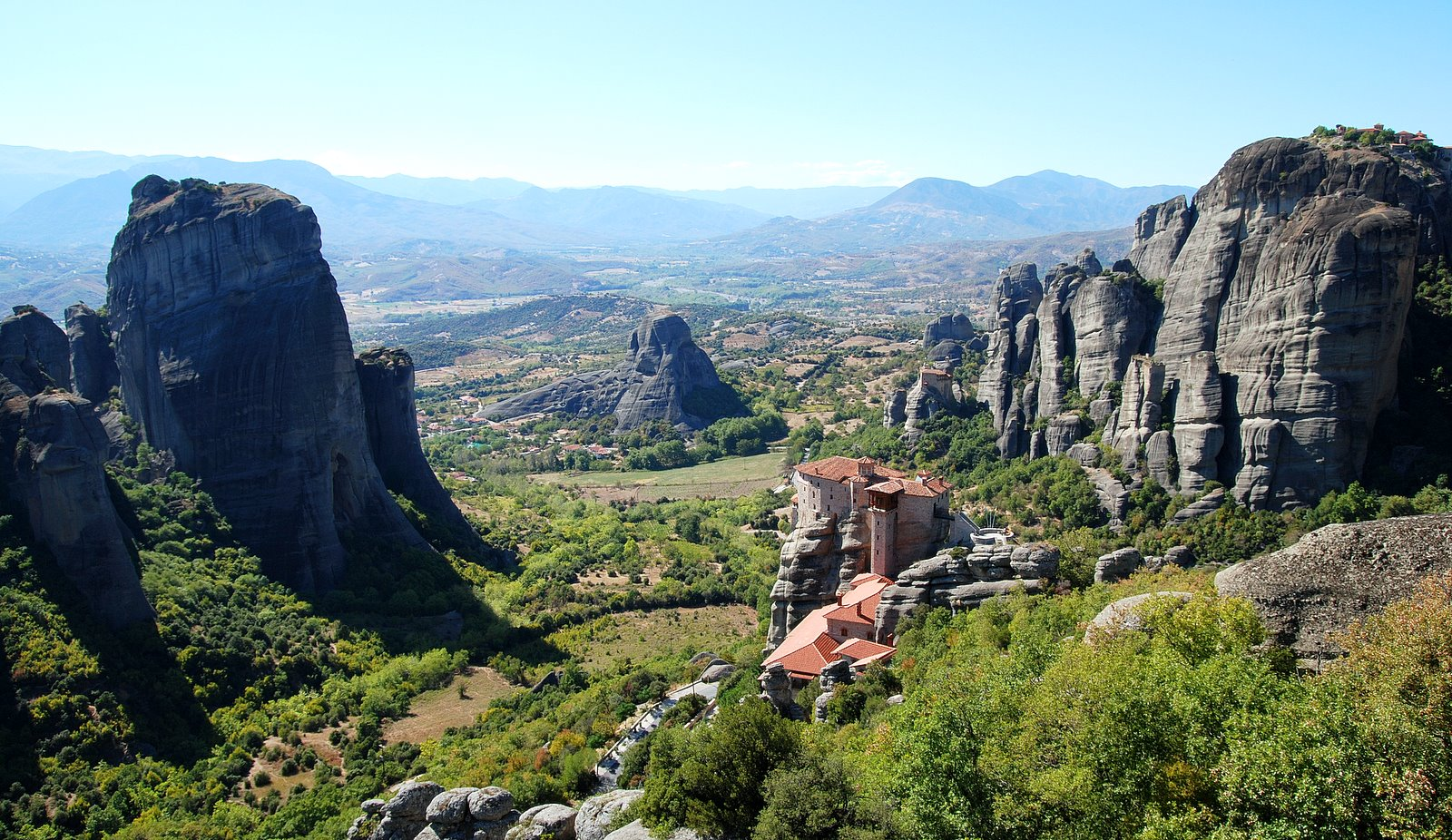
The Rousanou, the Nikolaos and the Grand Metereon monasteries

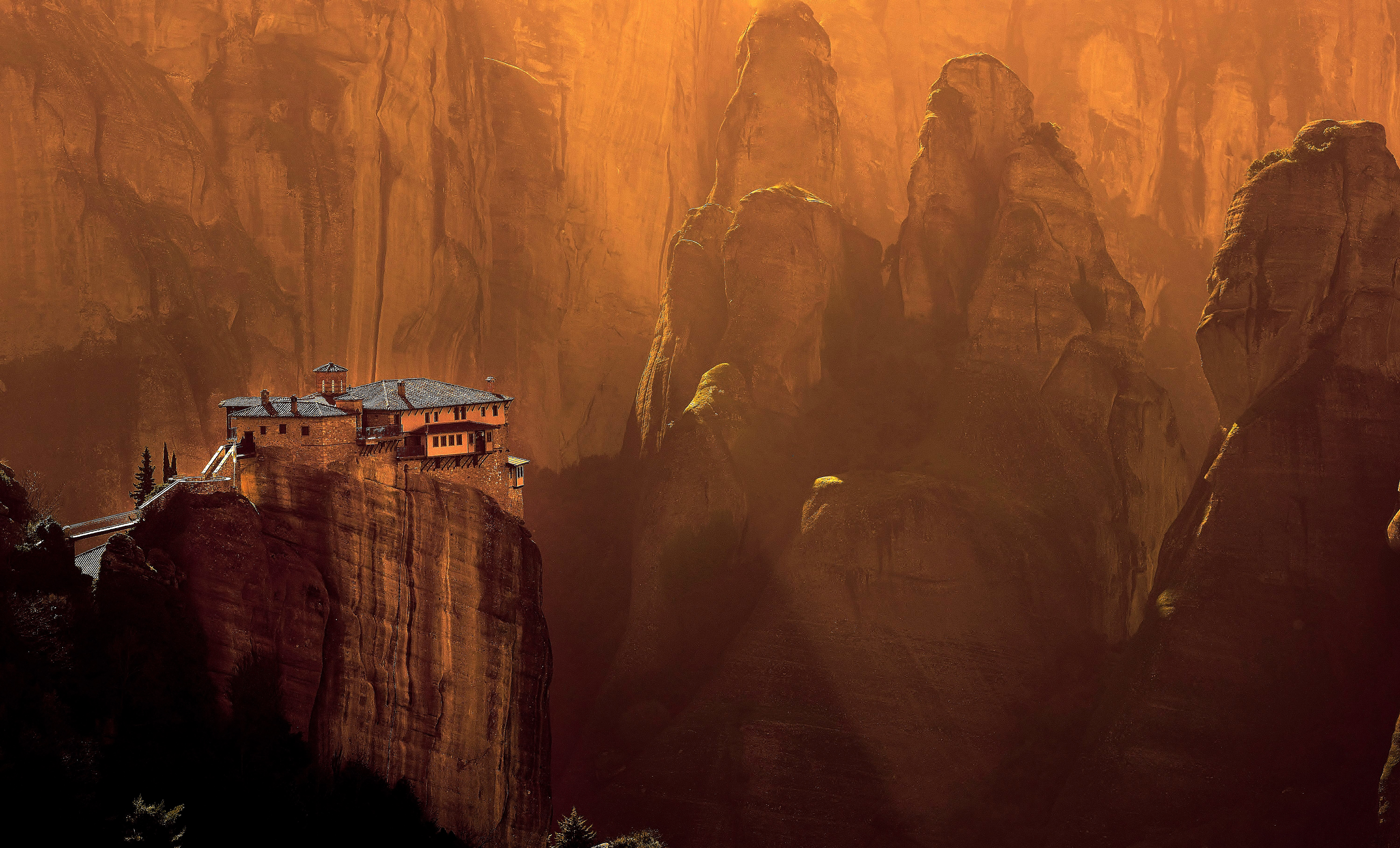
The Monastery of Rousanou (in order from background to foreground). The Holy Spirit Rock is on the left side, while Dupiani Rock can be seen in the center, at the middle of the valley.

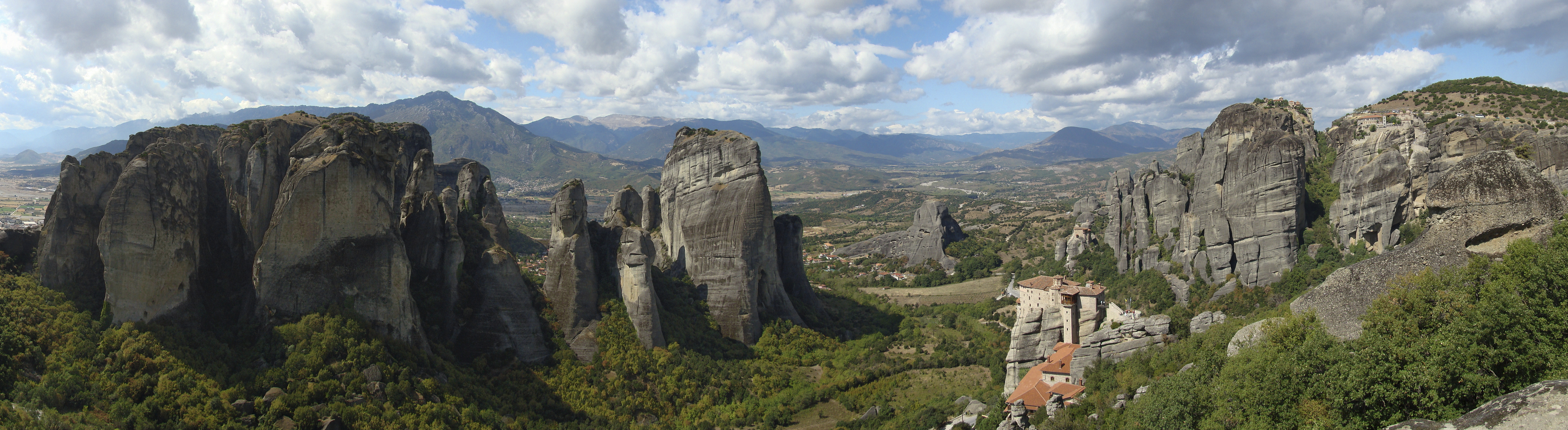
Panorama of the Meteora valley

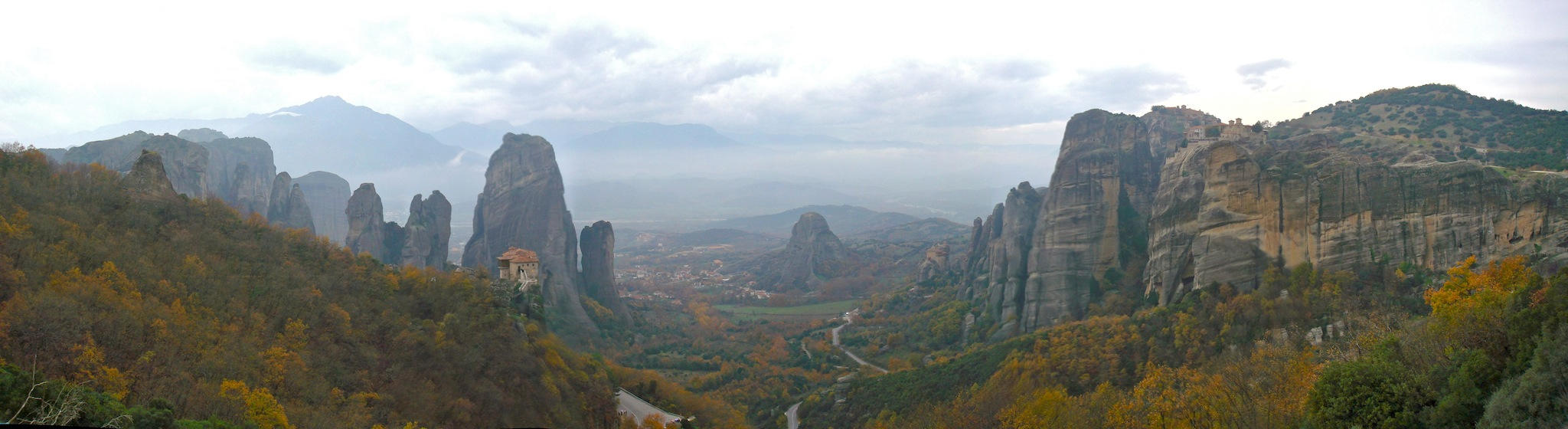
Panoramic view at Meteora valley

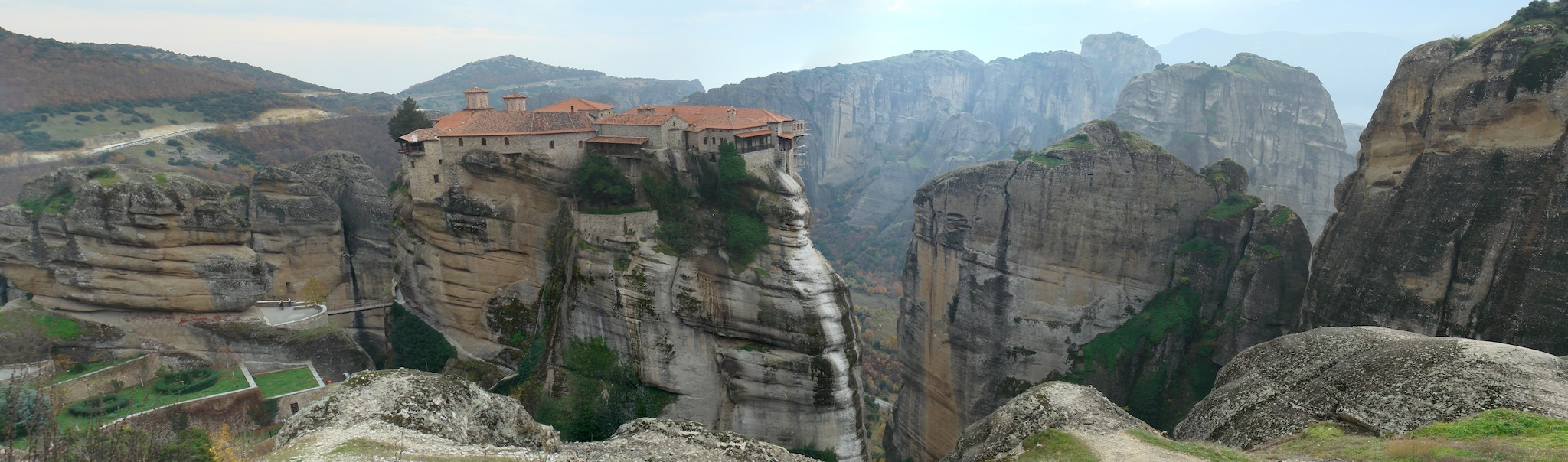
Panoramic view at the Monastery of Varlaam

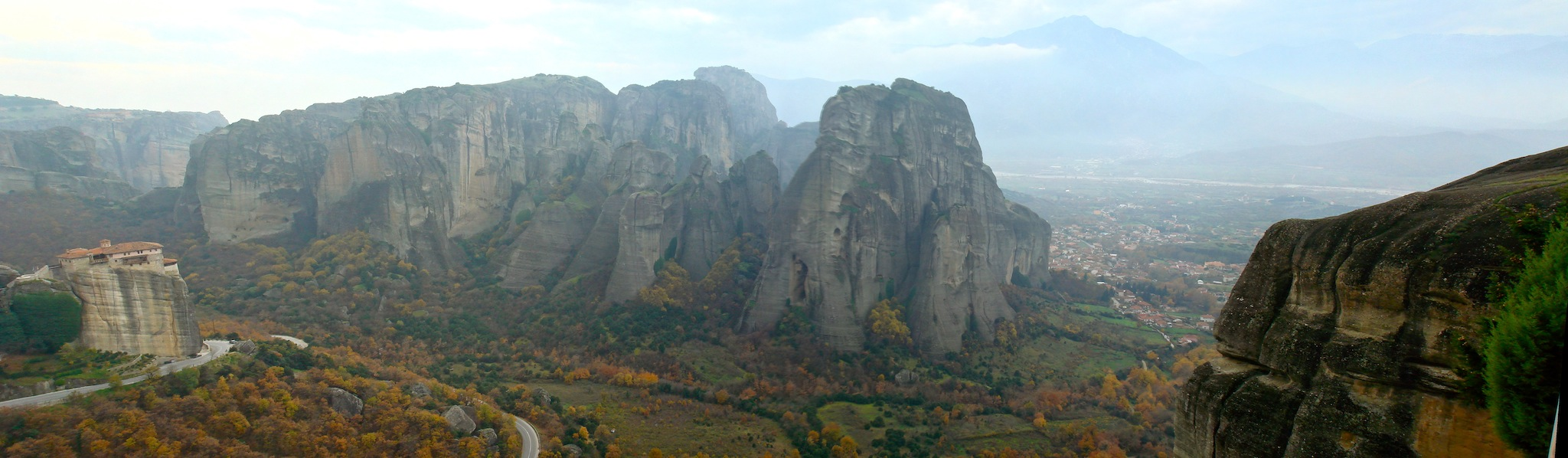
Panoramic view at the Monastery of Roussanou

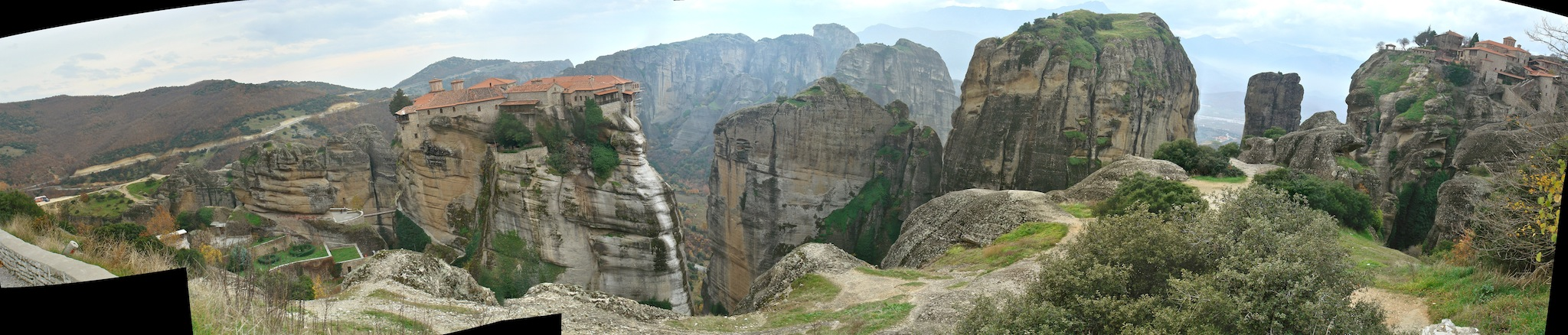
Panoramic view at monasteries of Varlaam and Grand Meteoron. From left to right: Kelarakia, Varlaam Monastery, Holy Monastery, Ypsilotera, Devil's Tower, and Grand Meteoron.

== Recreation ==
Meteora is popular with hikers, trail runners, mountain bikers, and rock climbers from around the world, particularly during the summer. The Meteora MTB Race, also known as the Vasilis Efstathiou (Βασίλης Ευσταθίου) MTB Race, is held annually at Meteora.

== In popular culture ==
- The 2015 Disney XD 2D animated romcom fantasy adventure series, Star vs. the Forces of Evil, has a character named Meteora, being the daughter of Mewni's ruler, Queen Eclipsa.
- The monastery of Holy Trinity was a filming location for the 1981 James Bond movie For Your Eyes Only.
- The 1957 film Boy on a Dolphin is partly shot in Meteora. Clifton Webb's character visits Meteora, and goes up to the Holy Trinity monastery to do some library research.
- Scenes in Tintin and the Golden Fleece were also shot at the Meteora monasteries.
- Michina, the main setting of the movie Pokémon: Arceus and the Jewel of Life, is based on Meteora.
- Meteora is the main location in the fiction book The Spook's Sacrifice, by English author Joseph Delaney.
- One of the surviving characters in Max Brooks's zombie apocalypse novel World War Z finds refuge and peace of mind in the monasteries during and after the zombie war.
- The 2012 film Meteora, directed by Spiros Stathoulopoulos, is set in the monasteries and scenery of Meteora.
- The primary location and name of Volume 3 in the comic book series Le Décalogue by French author Frank Giroud is based on Meteora.
- The Call of Duty: Modern Warfare 3 DLC Map "Sanctuary" is set in the monasteries of the Meteora.
- The 2003 album by Linkin Park takes its name from the site.
- The monasteries were a filming location for the 1976 action movie Sky Riders. starring Susannah York, James Coburn and Robert Culp.
- In The Young Indiana Jones Chronicles episode "Travels with Father", Indiana and his father visit Meteora.
- Meteora served as an inspiration for the Eyrie in the Game of Thrones television series.
- The design of the Elysium realm in The Fate of Atlantis downloadable chapter of Assassin's Creed Odyssey was inspired by the geology of Meteora.
- Meteora was the location of the first challenge in the eighth season of the Belgian reality show De Mol.
- A professional wrestling move innovated by CIMA was named after the Meteora, as that was where he had proposed to his wife.
- The external design of the level "St. Francis' Folly" in the 1996 game Tomb Raider and its 2007 remake was inspired by the lofty monasteries of Meteora.
- Meteo, a fictional country from Disco Elysium, is based on Meteora.
