= Agia (Meteora) =

Mountain and former monastery in Kalabaka Municipality, Thessaly Region, Greece

- Αγιά
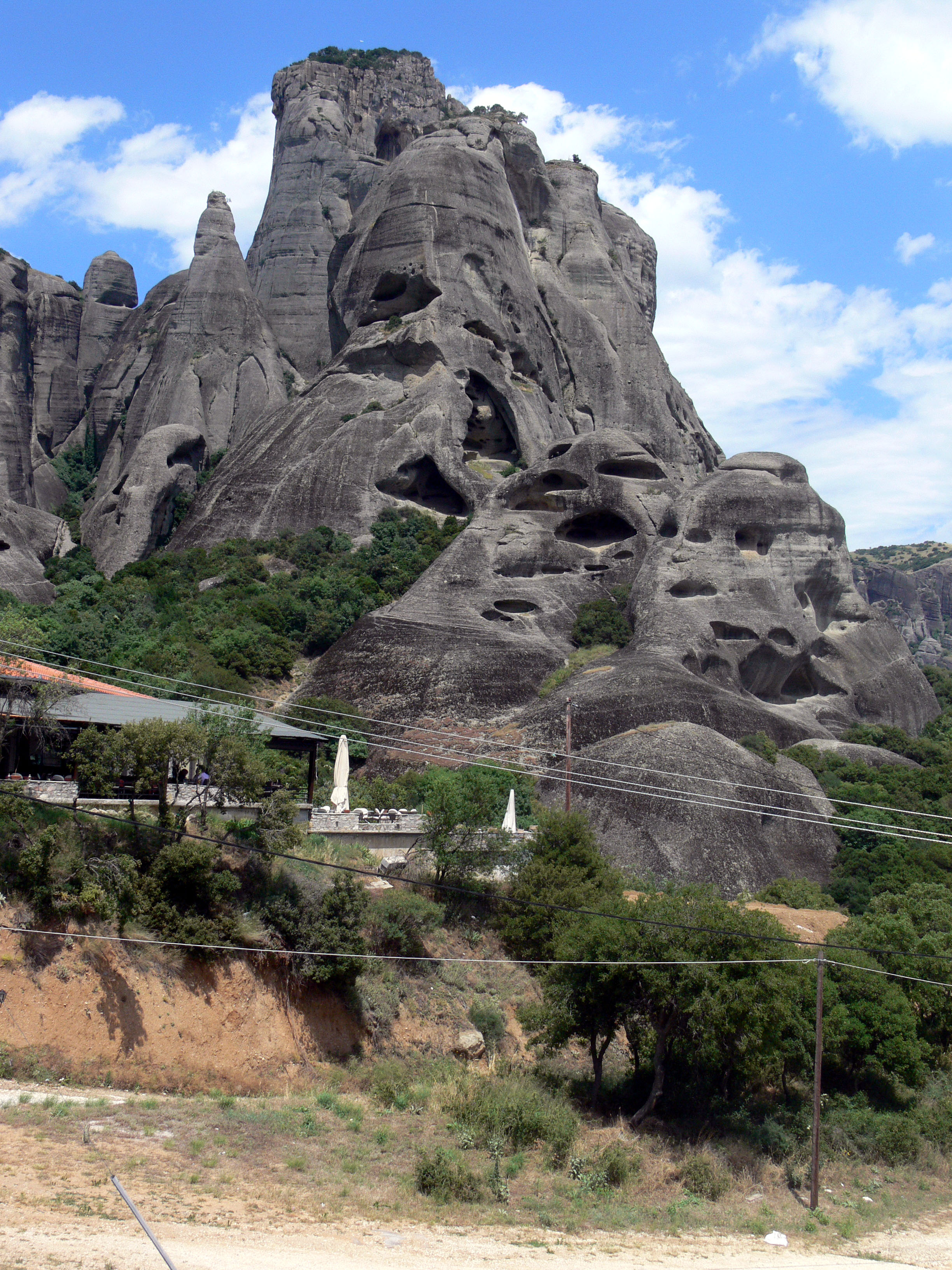
- Agia Rock

Highest point
- Elevation: 630 m (2,070 ft)
- Listing: Rock formations of Greece
- Coordinates: 39°42′42″N 21°37′28″E

Geography
- Location within Greece
- Location: Meteora
- Country: Greece
- Region: Thessaly
- Regional unit: Trikala
- Settlement: Kalabaka

Agia (Greek: Αγιά) is a rock in the Meteora rock formation complex of Thessaly, Greece. The rock overlooks the town of Kalabaka.

The peak of Agia stands at a height of 630 m (2,070 ft) above sea level.

The main rock known as Megali Agia, or "Large Aya." The lower part is called Mikri Agia (Μικρή Αγιά), or "Small Aya."

== Monastery of the Holy Apostles ==
Monastery of the Holy Apostles
- Αγίων Αποστόλων
- Monastery of the Holy Apostles
- 39°42′42″N 21°37′31″E
- Location: Kalabaka, Thessaly
- Country: Greece
- Denomination: Greek Orthodox (former)

History
- Status: Monastery (former)

Architecture
- Functional status: Inactive (ruinous state)
- Completed: c. 16th century

The ruins of the Monastery of the Holy Apostles (Greek: Αγίων Αποστόλων, romanized: Agion Apostolon or Ιερά Μονή Αγίων Αποστόλων (Αϊά)) are located on the rock. It was founded in the early 16th century, perhaps by the monk Kallistos and has been documented in 1551. Only ruins, murals, carved stairs, and a cistern remain.
