= Ypsilotera Monastery =

Former monastery in Kalabaka Municipality, Thessaly Region, Greece

- Μονή Υψηλοτέρας
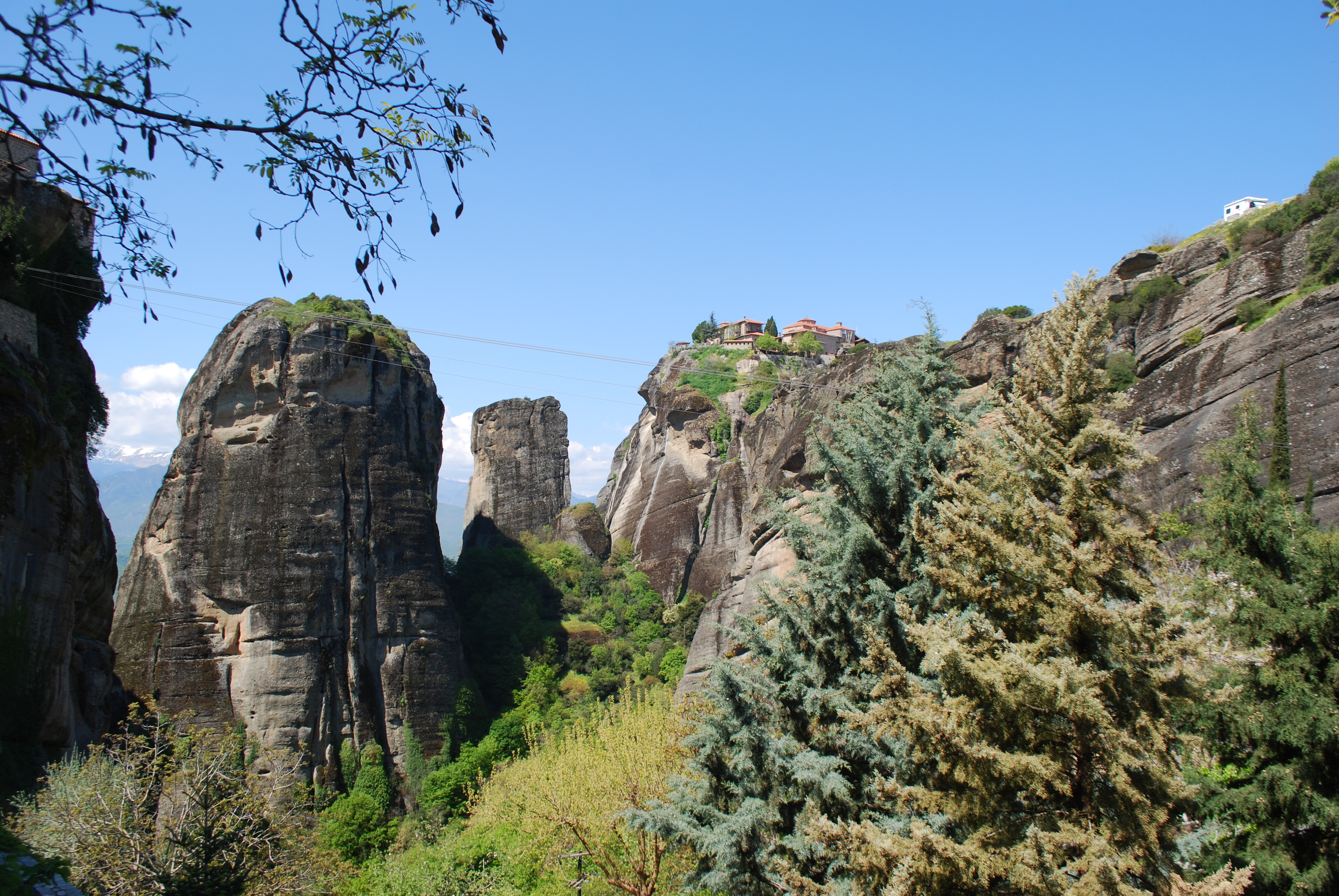
- Ypsilotera is the free-standing dome-shaped rock on the left, covered with vegetation on top

- Location of the former monastery in Greece
- Ypsilotera Monastery
- 39°43′30″N 21°37′39″E
- Location: Kalabaka, Thessaly
- Country: Greece
- Denomination: Greek Orthodox (former)

History
- Status: Monastery (former)

Architecture
- Functional status: Inactive (in partial ruins)
- Architectural type: Monastery
- Style: Byzantine (Athonite)
- Completed: 1347

The Ypsilotera Monastery (Greek: Μονή Υψηλοτέρας, lit. 'Monastery of the Most High'), also known as Kalligrafon Monastery (Καλλιγράφων), is a former Greek Orthodox monastery that is part of the Meteora monastery complex in Kalabaka, in the Thessaly region of central Greece.

== Names ==
Other names for the monastery include:

- Μονή της Θεοτόκου της Υψηλοτέρας Πέτρας (Monastery of Theotokos of the Highest Rock)
- Μονή των Καλλιγράφων (Monastery of Calligraphy)
- Εισοδίων της Θεοτόκου (Entry of the Theotokos)
- Μονή του Δωροθέου (Monastery of Dorotheos)

== Description ==
The monastery was famous for its manuscripts and calligraphers. It was founded in 1347 by Paschalis of Kalambaka. It is located on Ypsilotera Rock, that is 585.7 metres (1,922 ft) above sea level, next to the "Devil's Tower," a geological rock formation that is between the Monastery of St. Nicholas Anapausas and Monastery of Varlaam.

The best views of the monastery ruins can be seen from the monasteries of Great Meteoron and Varlaam. The Holy Monastery is located on a lower rock that is directly adjacent to Ypsilotera Rock.

== See also ==
- Church of Greece
- List of Greek Orthodox monasteries in Greece
