= Pyxari =

Rock in Meteora, Greece

- Πυξάρι
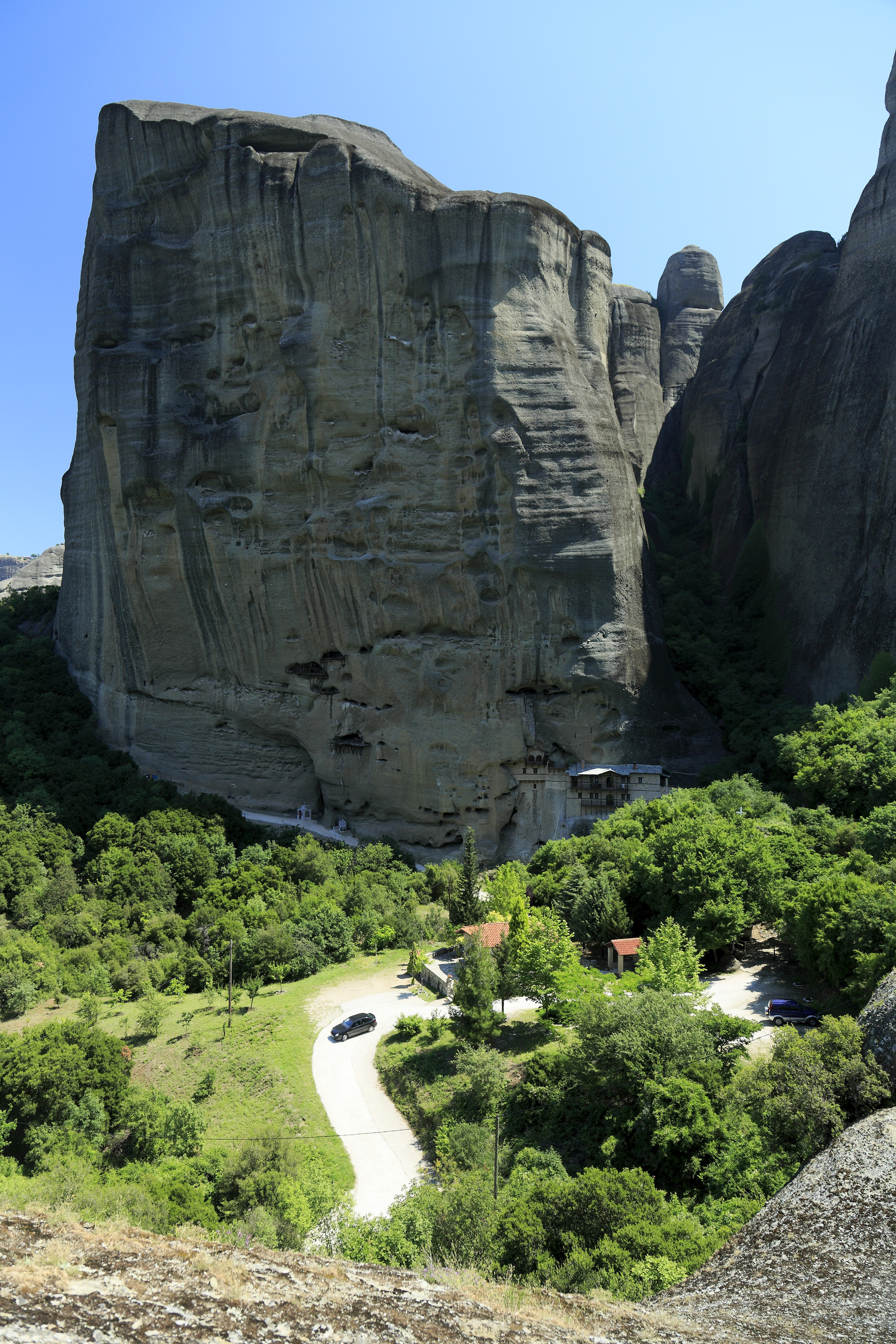

Highest point
- Elevation: 523.9 m (1,719 ft)
- Coordinates: 39.7131°N 21.6228°E

Geography
- Location: Meteora
- Country: Greece
- Administrative region: Thessaly
- Regional unit: Trikala
- Settlement: Kalabaka

Pyxari or Pixari (Greek: Πυξάρι) is a rock in the Meteora rock formation complex of Thessaly, Greece. Pyxari is located at the southwestern edge of the Meteora rock complex.

== Monasteries and hermitages ==
The rock has cave hermitages perched on cliffs, which were formerly inhabited by Christian ascetics.

The Monastery of St. Anthony (Agiou Antoniou, Αγίου Αντωνίου) was built around the 14th century on the south side of Pyxari Rock. Only a small church has survived from the monastery (39.712166°N 21.621643°E). It is located just to the east of the Monastery of Saint Gregory the Theologian.

The historic Cell of Constantius (Κελί του Κωνστάντιου) (39.7142225°N 21.6249977°E) is located to the northeast of Pyxari Rock.

Other hermitages or monasteries at Pyxari include:

- Hermitage of Saint Gregory the Theologian (Ασκηταριά Αγίου Γρηγορίου του Θεολόγου) (39.7123978°N 21.6215300°E)
- Monastery of Chrysostomos
