= Monastery of St. John the Baptist (Meteora) =

Former monastery in Kalabaka Municipality, Thessaly Region, Greece

- Μονή Αγίου Ιωάννη Προδρόμου
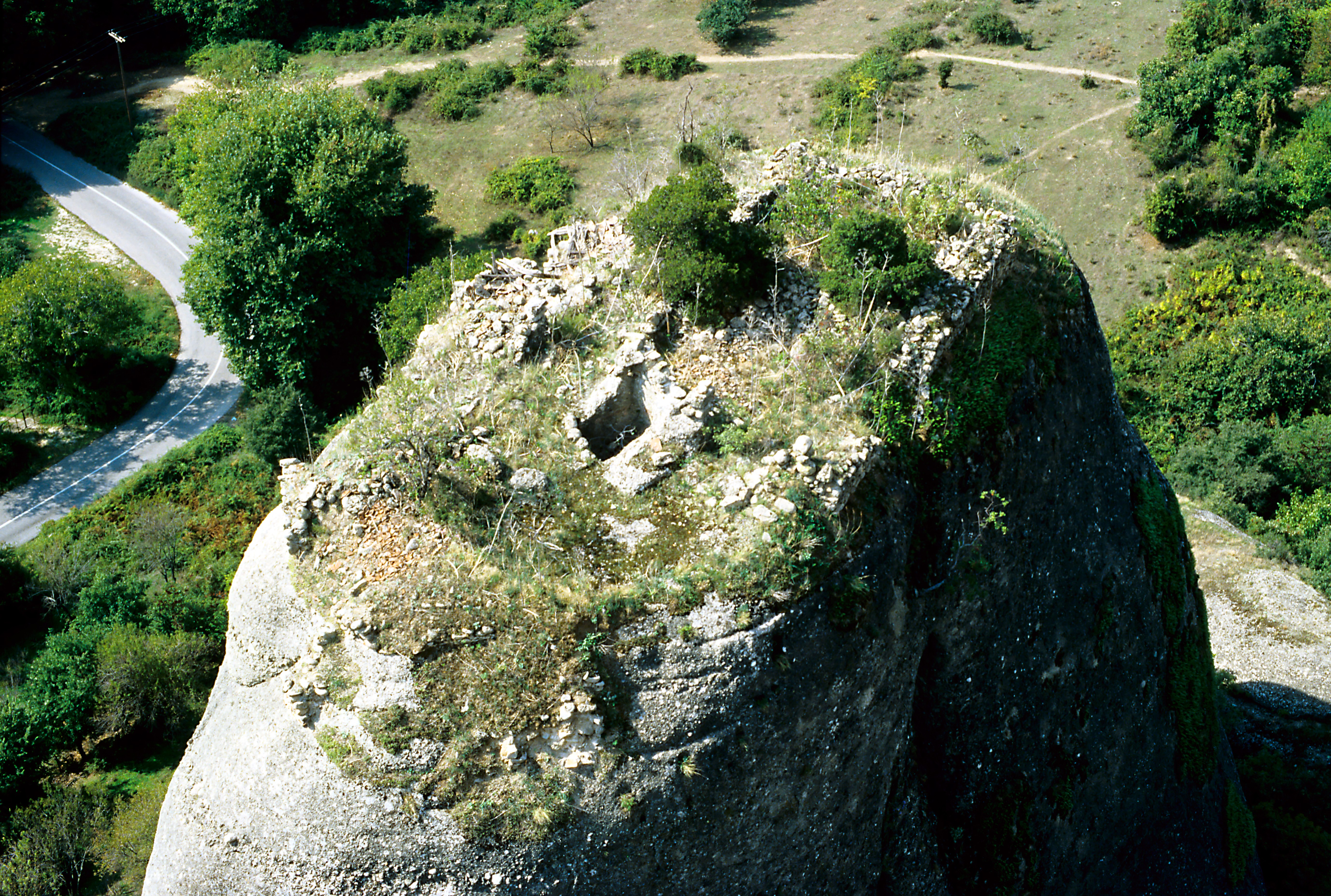
- The ruins of the monastery, from above

- Location of the former monastery in Greece
- Monastery of St. John the Baptist
- 39°43′25″N 21°37′26″E
- Location: Kalabaka, Thessaly
- Country: Greece
- Denomination: Greek Orthodox (former)

History
- Status: Monastery (former)
- Dedication: Saint John the Baptist

Architecture
- Functional status: Inactive (in partial ruins)
- Architectural type: Monastery
- Style: Byzantine (Athonite)
- Completed: c. 15th century

The Monastery of St. John the Baptist (Greek: Μονή Αγίου Ιωάννη Προδρόμου, romanized: Moni Agiou Ioanni Prodromou) is a former Greek Orthodox monastery that is part of the Meteora monastery complex in Kalabaka, in the Thessaly region of central Greece.

It is located on a rock directly adjacent to the Monastery of St. Nicholas Anapausas. The rock on which the monastery was built was the residence of Athanasius the Meteorite during the 14th century. Theophanes and Nektarios Apsarades, the founders of the Monastery of Varlaam, also lived on the rock for seven years before they built Varlaam.

== See also ==
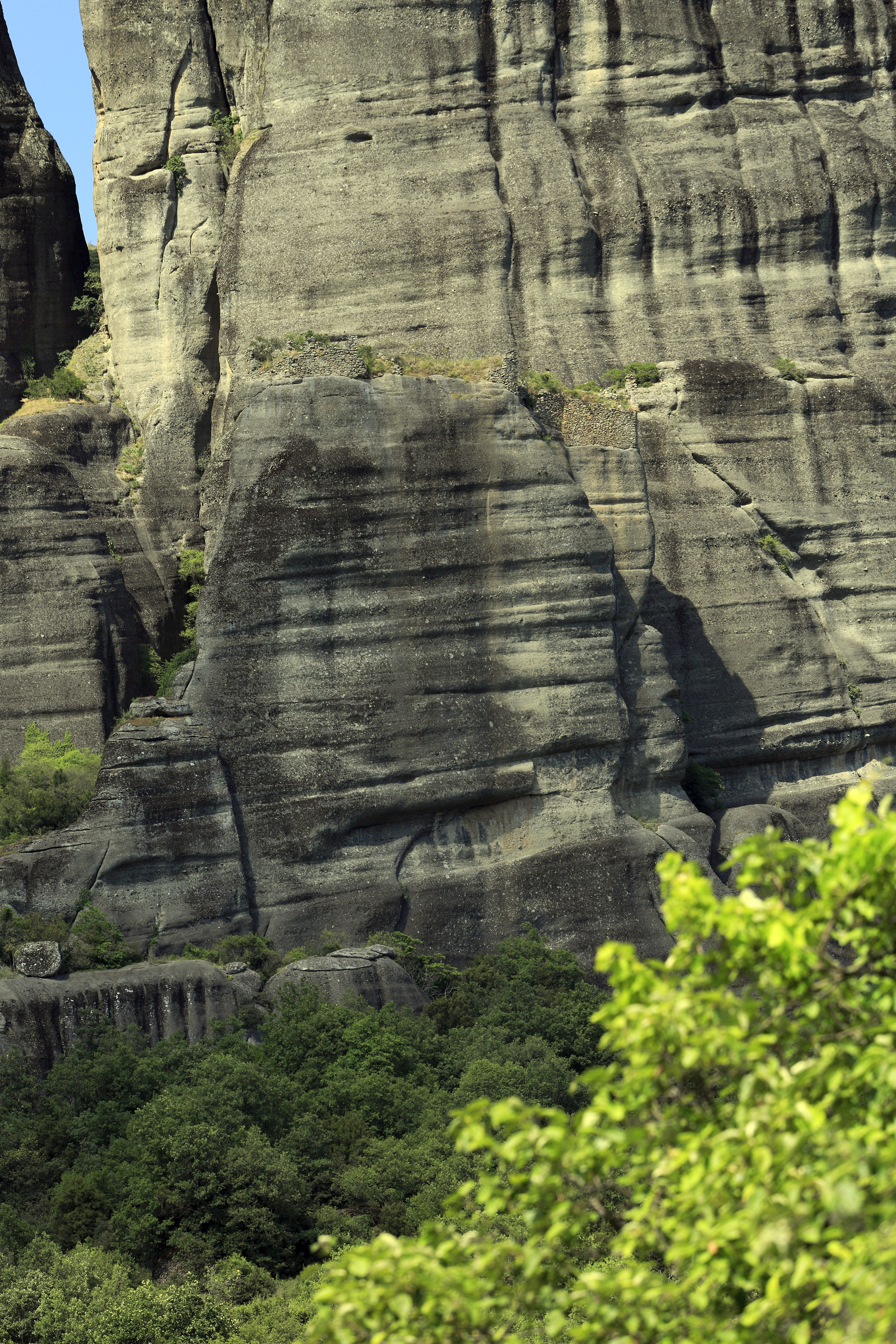
Another view of the monastery ruins

- Church of Greece
- List of Greek Orthodox monasteries in Greece
