= Monastery of St. Anthony (Meteora) =

Former monastery in Kalabaka Municipality, Thessaly Region, Greece

- Μονή Αγίου Αντωνίου
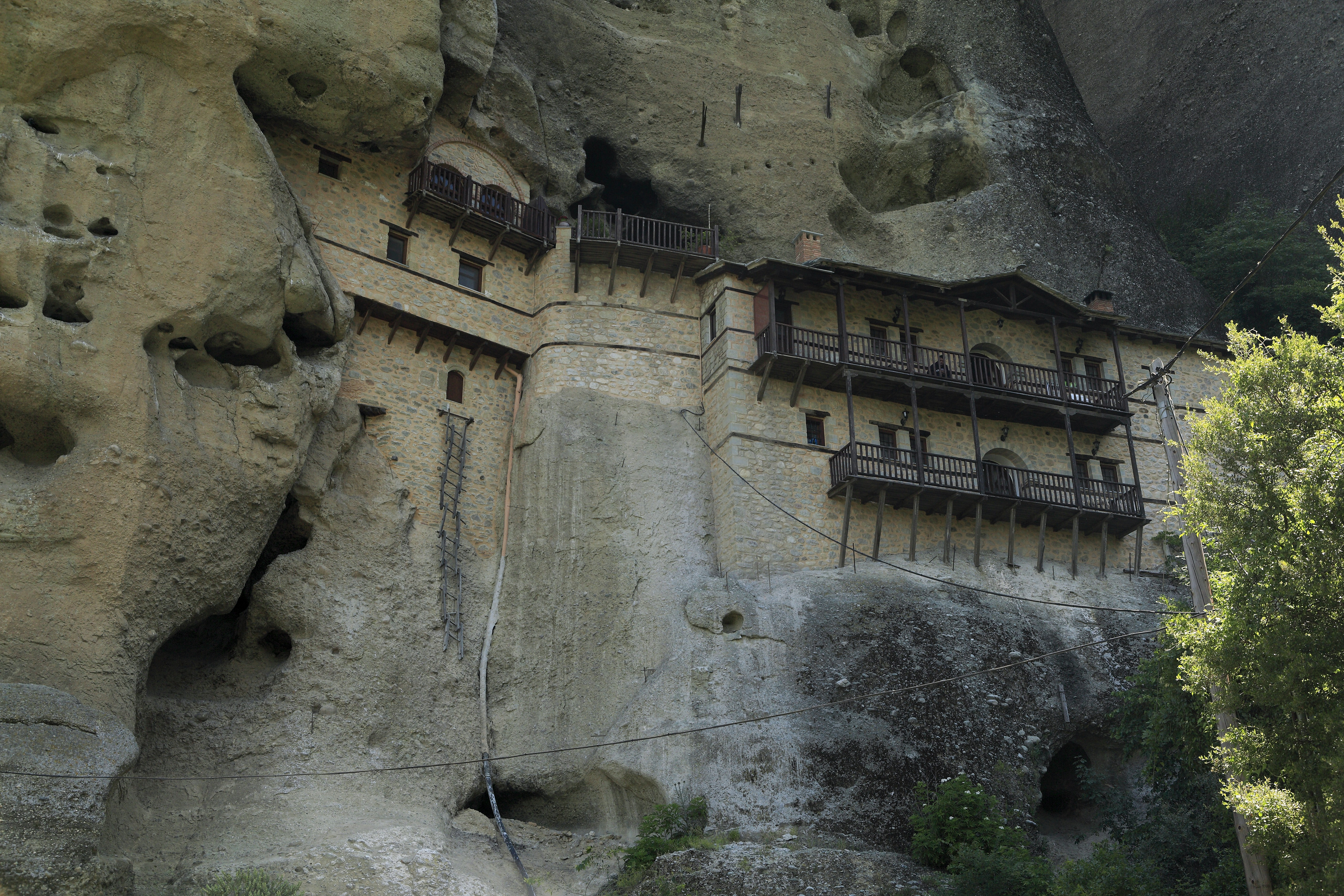
- The ruins of the monastery in the foreground

- Location of the former monastery in Greece
- Monastery of St. Anthony
- 39°42′44″N 21°37′18″E
- Location: Kalabaka, Thessaly
- Country: Greece
- Denomination: Greek Orthodox (former)

History
- Status: Monastery (former)

Architecture
- Functional status: Inactive (in partial ruins)
- Architectural type: Monastery
- Style: Byzantine (Athonite)
- Completed: c. 14th century

The Monastery of St. Anthony (Greek: Μονή Αγίου Αντωνίου, romanized: Moni Agiou Antoniou) is a former Greek Orthodox monastery that is part of the Meteora monastery complex in Kalabaka, in the Thessaly region of central Greece. It is the main monastery on Pyxari Rock.

== Overview ==
The monastery was built around the 14th century. The main entrance of the monastery can be accessed via a paved road.

== Gallery ==
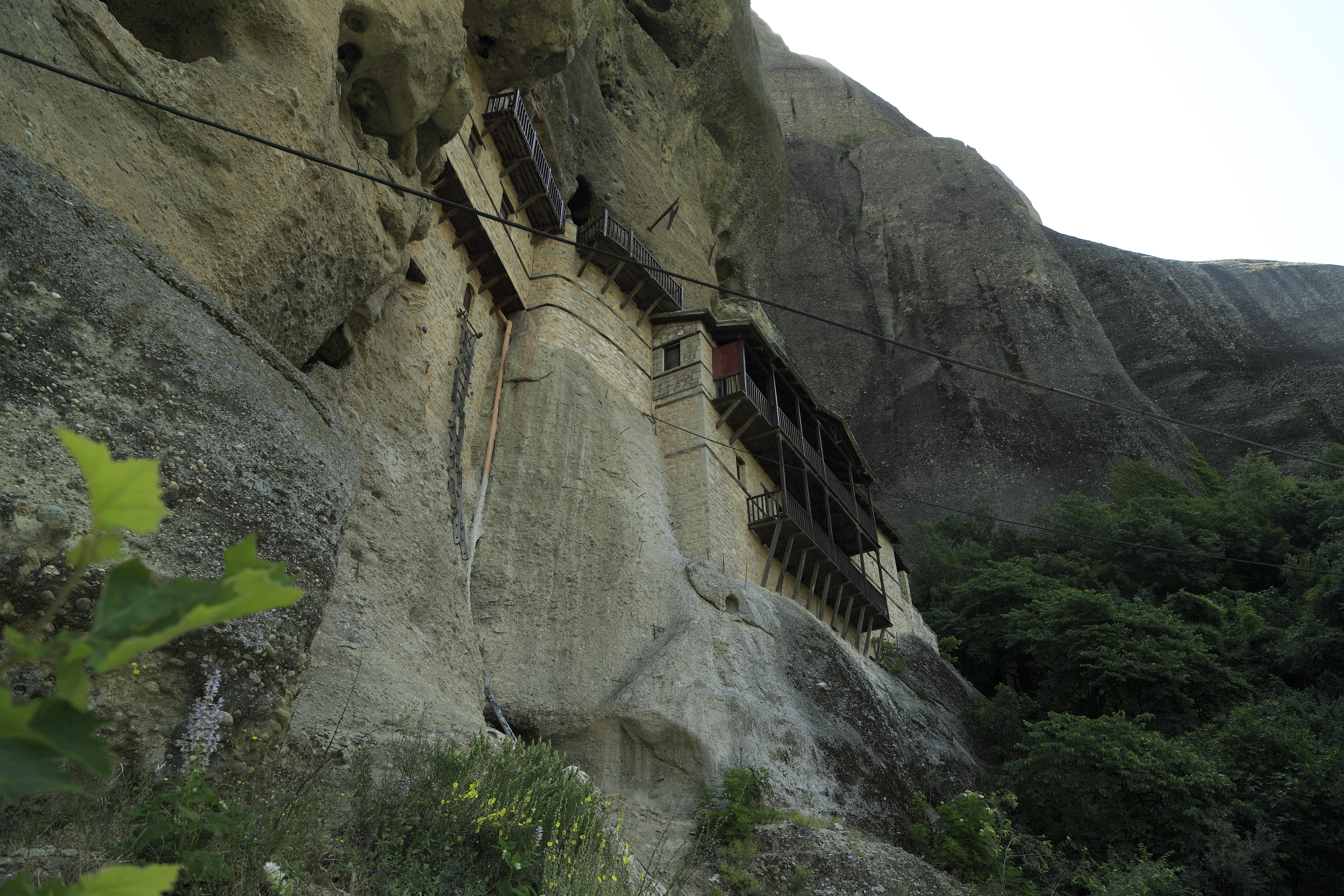

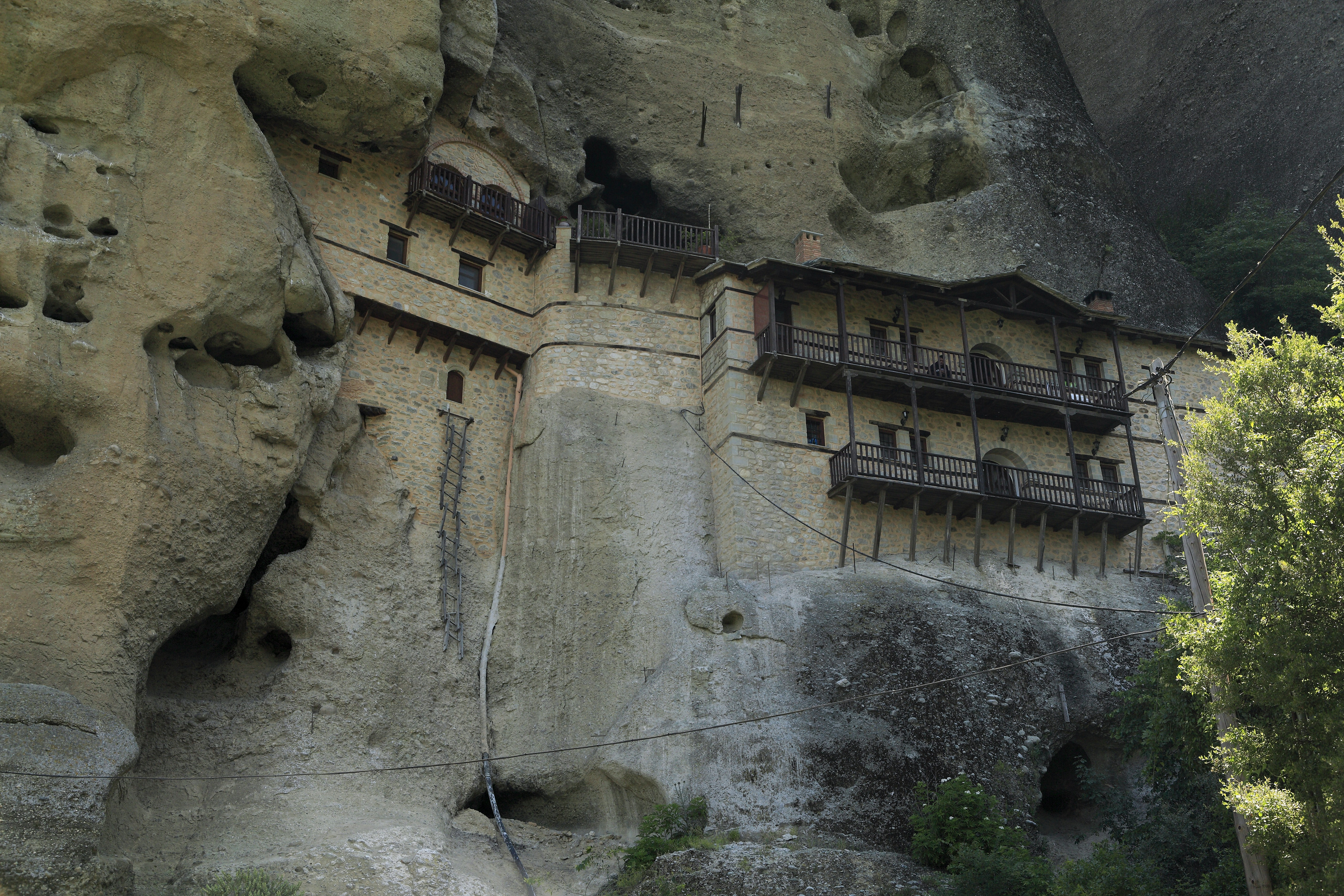

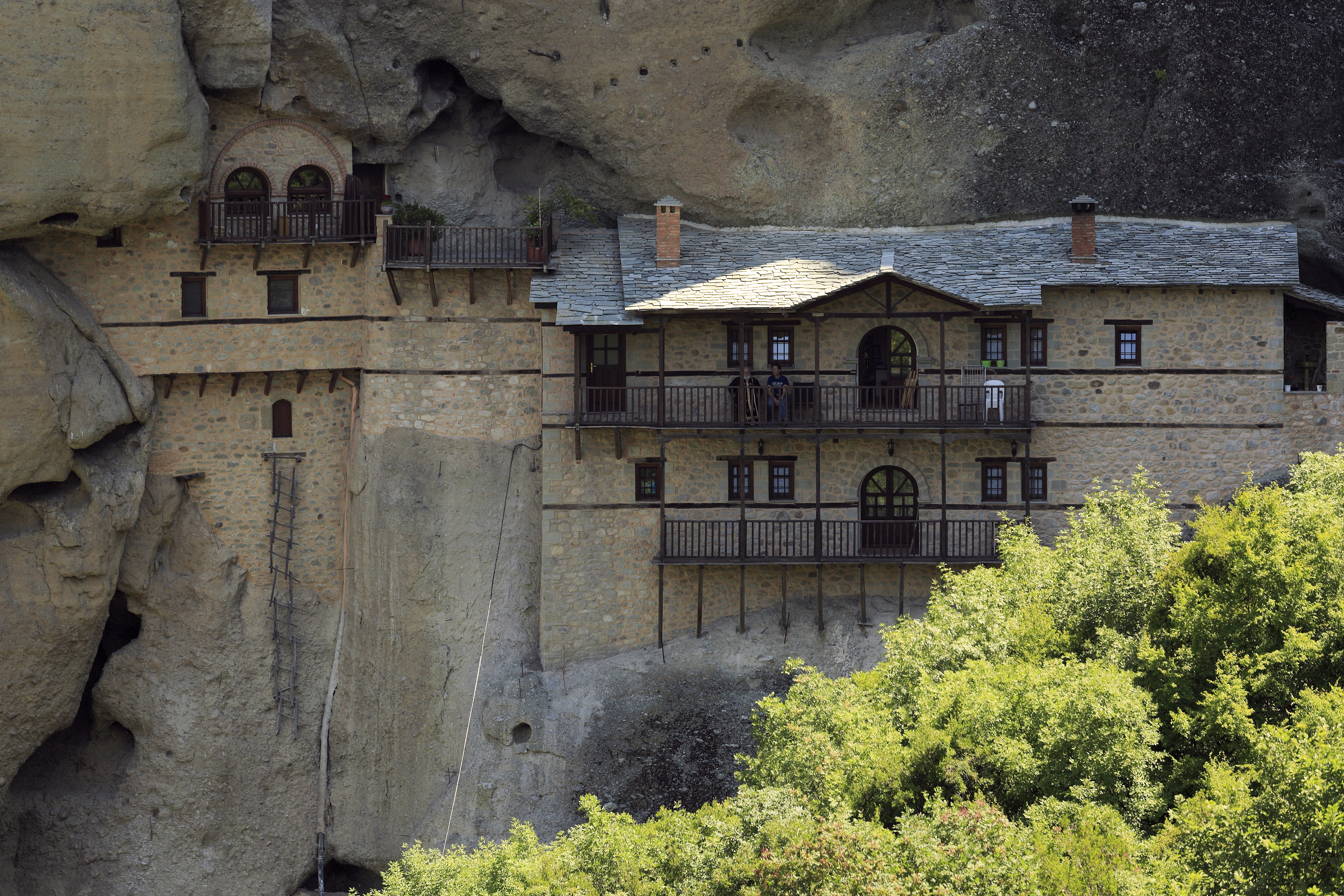

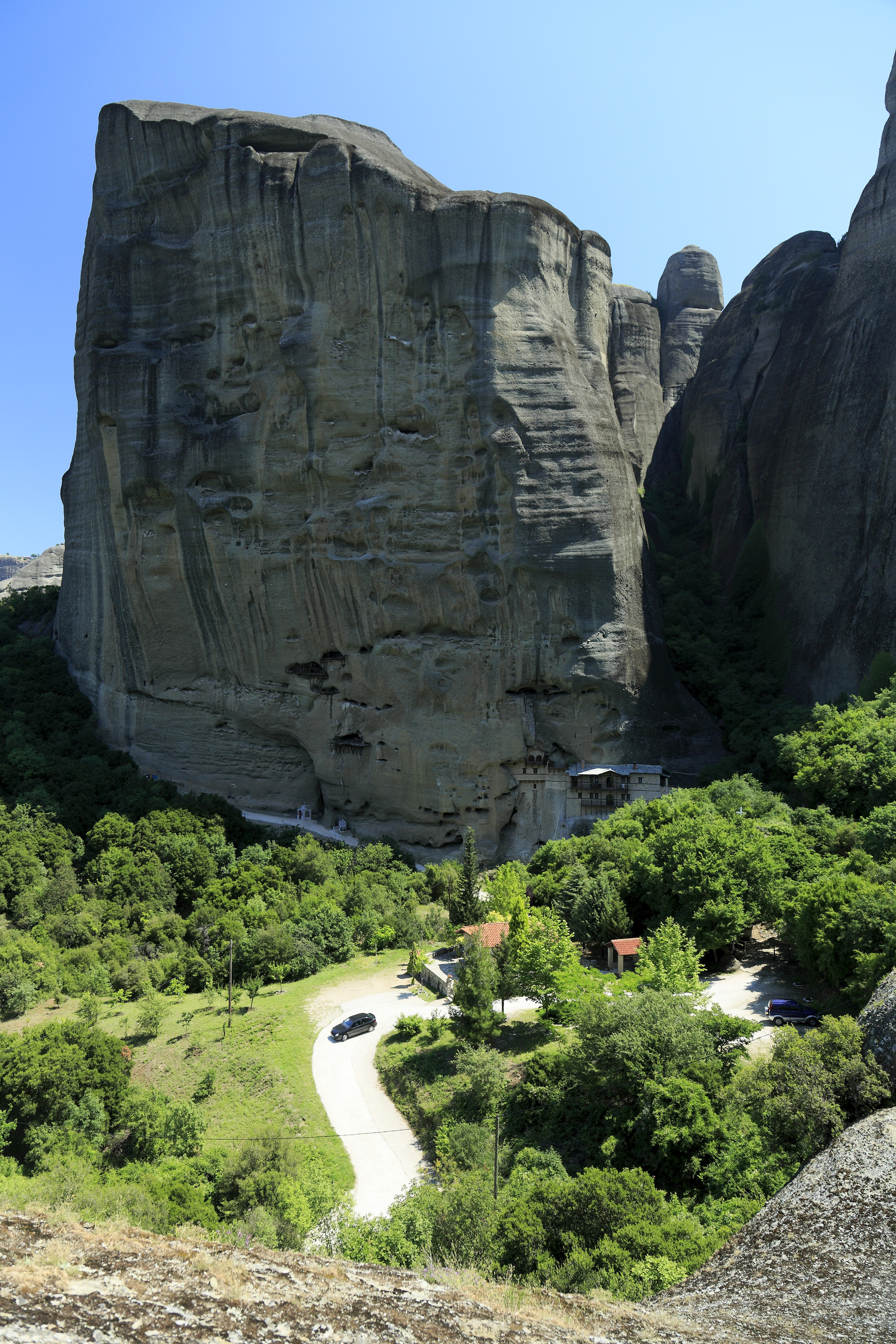

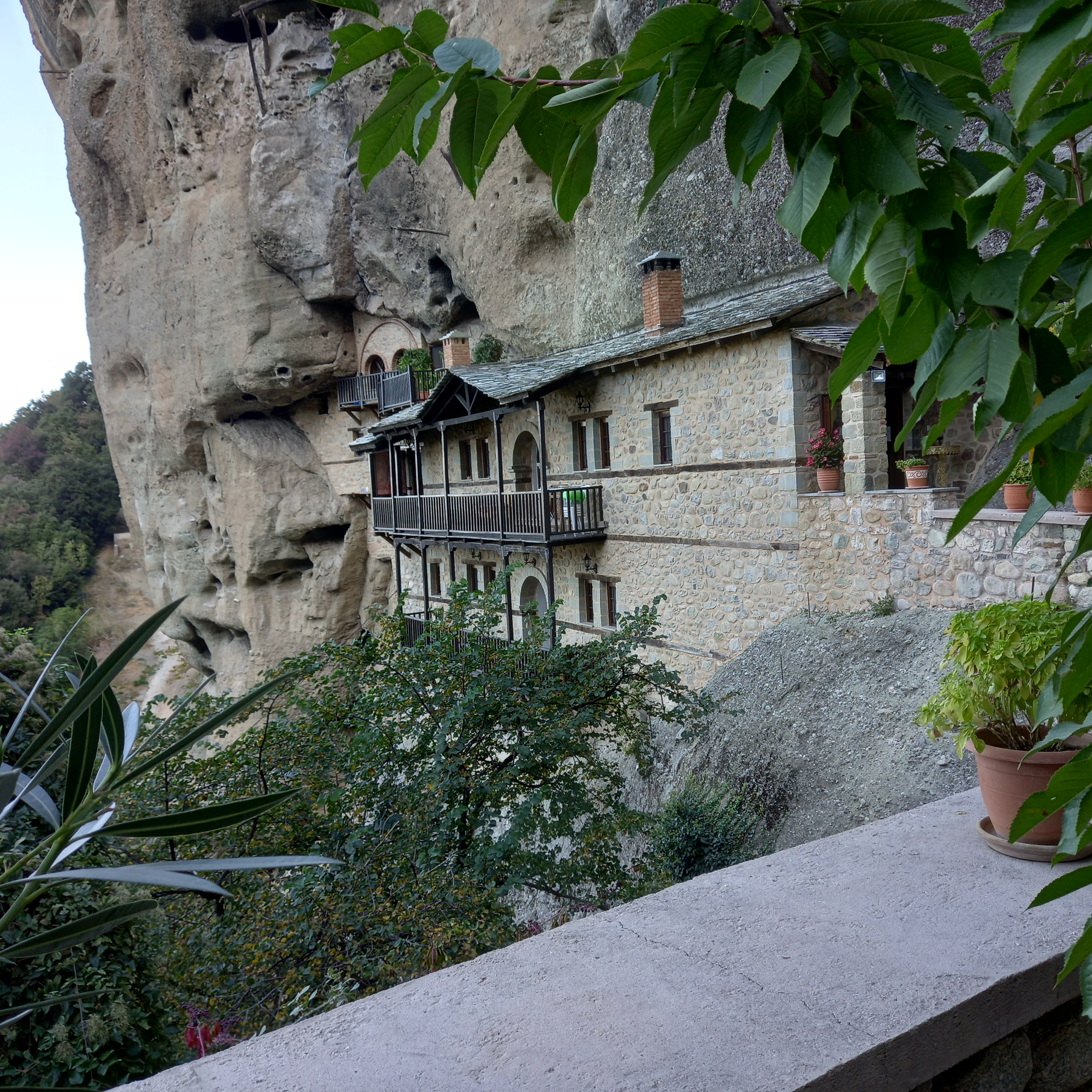

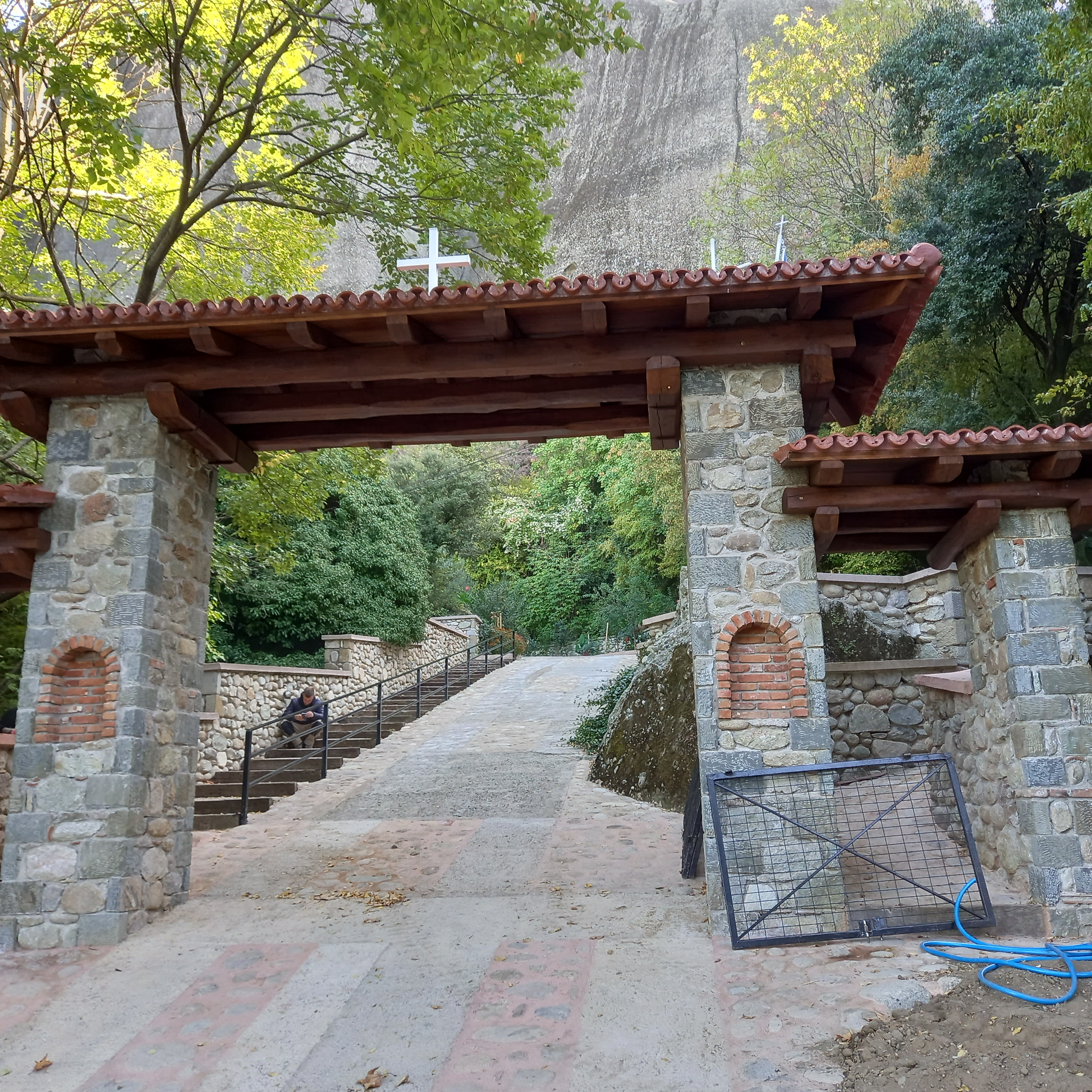
Main entrance gate to the monastery

== See also ==
- Church of Greece
- List of Greek Orthodox monasteries in Greece
