= Monastery of Rousanou =

Monastery in Kalabaka Municipality, Thessaly Region, Greece

Monastery of St. Rousanou
- Μεγάλο Μετέωρο
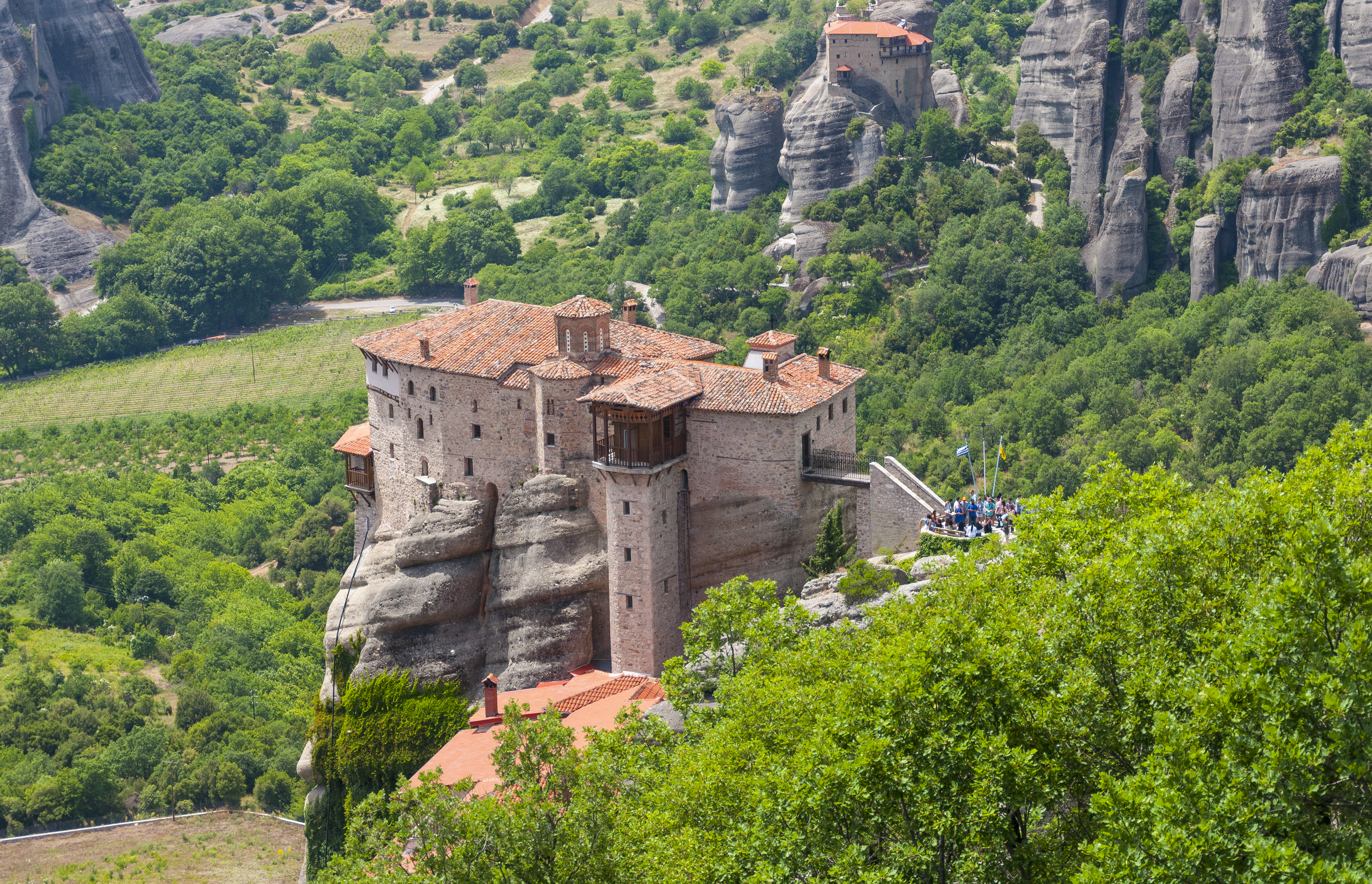

- Location of the monastery in Greece
- 39°42′51″N 21°37′37″E
- Location: Kalambaka, Pineios Valley, Thessaly
- Country: Greece
- Denomination: Greek Orthodox

History
- Status: Monastery now functioning as a convent

Architecture
- Functional status: Active as a convent
- Architectural type: Monastery
- Style: Byzantine (Athonite)
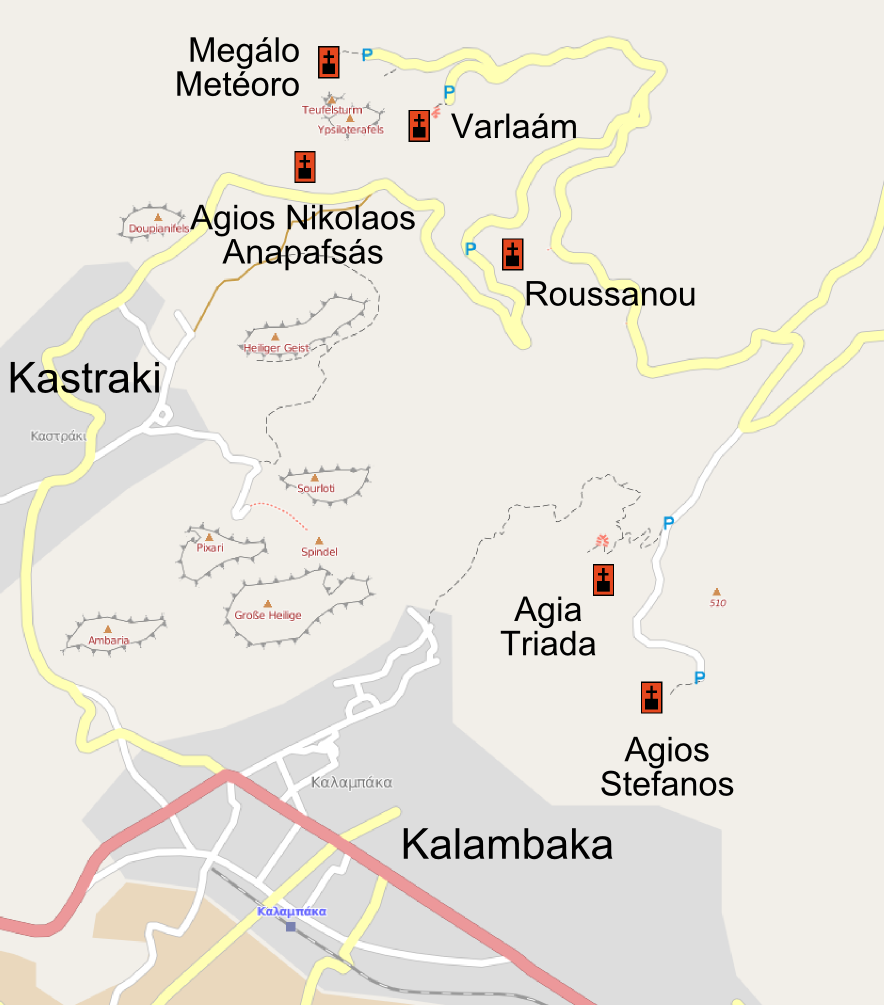
- Map of Meteora, with the six extant monasteries, as marked

UNESCO World Heritage Site
- Part of: Meteora
- Criteria: Cultural (i, ii, iv, v, vii)
- Reference: 455
- Inscription: 1988 (12th Session)
- Area: 271.87 ha (671.8 acres)
- Buffer zone: 1,884.14 ha (4,655.8 acres)

The Monastery of Rousanou (Greek: Μονή Ρουσάνου) is a Greek Orthodox monastery now used as a convent near the town of Kalambaka, in the Thessaly region of central Greece. It is located at the top of a rocky precipice over 415 metres (1,362 ft) above the Pineios valley floor. It is one of twenty-four monasteries that were originally built at Meteora. (Note: Meteora, translated from Greek, means "suspended in the air".) Collectively titled Meteora, in 1988 the extant six monasteries were inscribed on the UNESCO World Heritage List.

== Geography ==
Twenty-four monasteries were built on rock cliffs in the deltaic plains of Meteora. The cliffs rise to a height of more than 400 metres (1,300 ft). The monasteries are situated in the Pineios Valley within the Thessalian plains, close to the town of Kalambaka. The rock cliffs, dated by chemical analysis to be 60-million years old, were created during earthquakes, and are of sandstone and conglomerate formations caused by fluvial erosion. The sediments were once in an inland sea during the Pliocene epoch. The cliffs rose as a cone during the earthquakes, forming steep rock columns, known as "heavenly columns". The area is hilly and forested, with river valleys, and a protected area known as Trikala Aesthetic Forest.

Most of the monasteries were located near the Rousanou Monastery; however, both the monasteries of Saint Stephen and Holy Trinity are located further to the south.

To the southeast of Rousanou Monastery, the Psaropetra viewpoint is located by the side of a main road.

== History ==
The history of building monasteries on top of perilous cliffs near Meteora occurred between the 14th and 15th centuries. Even prior to this, in the 11th century, religious communities had established hermitages at the foot of these cliffs. In the 14th century, the titular emperor of Serbs and Greeks, John Uroš, became a monk and moved to Meteora; he endowed, rebuilt and established monasteries here. During the political upheavals in the region during this century, monks retreated to the haven offered by the cliffs. By end of the fifteenth century, there were 24 such monasteries, such as the Rousanou and St. Nicholas Anapausas.

As of December 2025, the Rousanou and St. Nicholas Anapafsas monasteries were extant, but inactive; and four of the original monasteries were occupied and in use, including the Monastery of Great Meteoron, Holy Trinity (Aghia Trias), St. Stephen (Aghios Stephanos), and the Varlaam Monastery; and together the six monasteries make up the UNESCO World Heritage Site, named Meteora; inscribed in 1988.

== See also ==
- Church of Greece
- List of Greek Orthodox monasteries in Greece
