= Monastery of Saint Stephen (Meteora) =

Monastery in Kalabaka Municipality, Thessaly Region, Greece

- Μονή Αγίου Στεφάνου
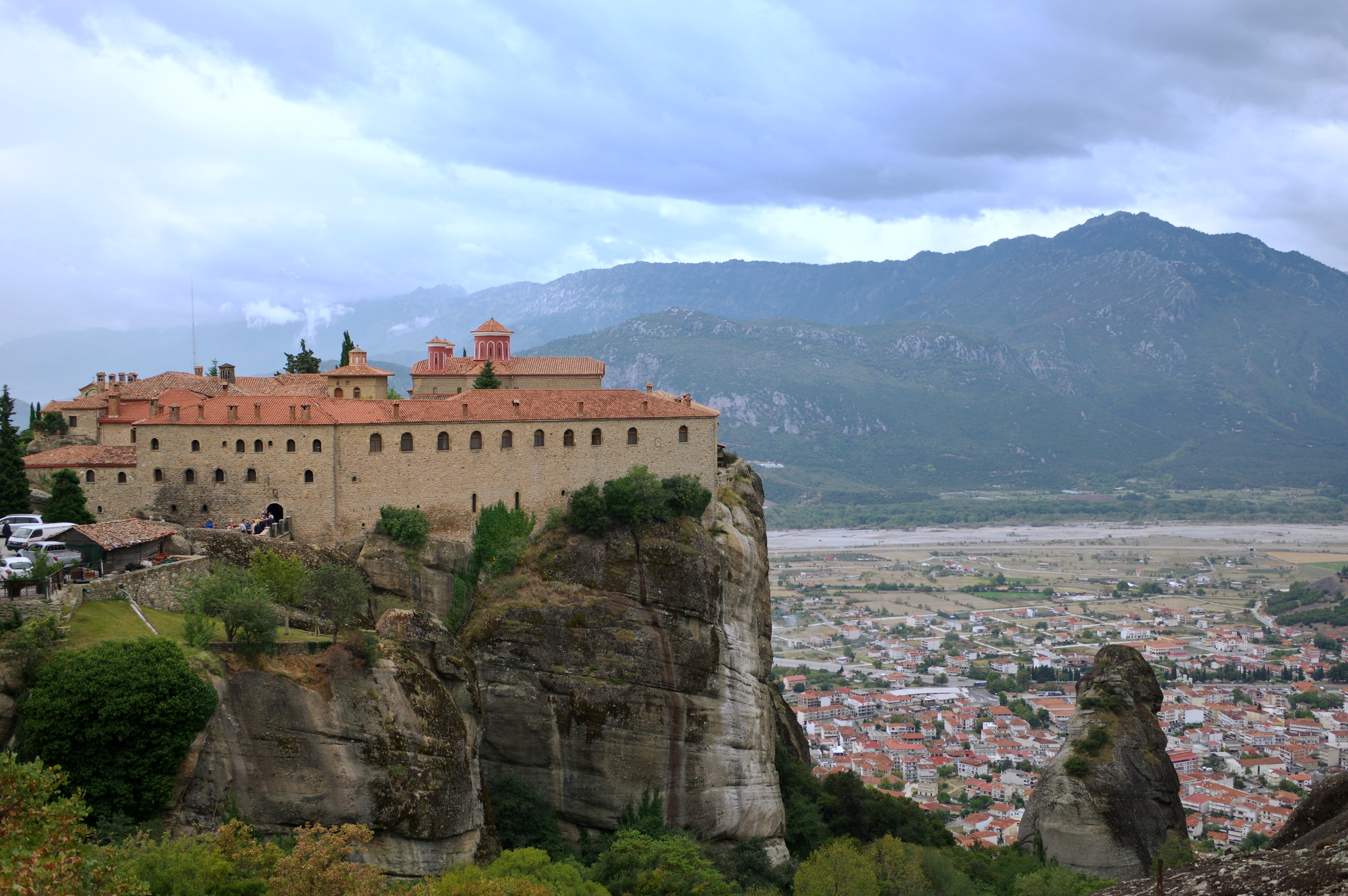
- The monastery in 2017

- Location of the monastery in Greece
- 39°42′51″N 21°37′37″E
- Location: Kalambaka, Pineios Valley, Thessaly
- Country: Greece
- Denomination: Greek Orthodox

History
- Status: Monastery (14th century–1961); Nunnery (since 1961– )

Architecture
- Functional status: Active
- Architectural type: Monastery
- Style: Byzantine (Athonite)
- Completed: 14th century
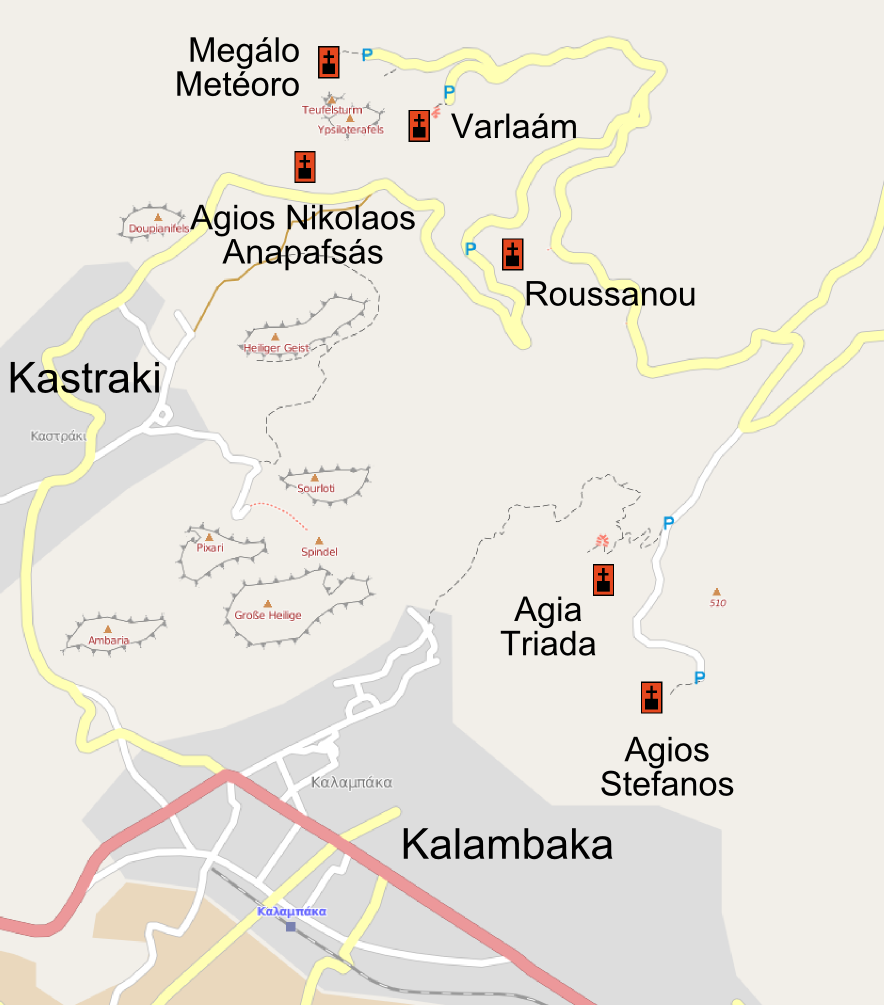
- Map of Meteora, with the six extant monasteries, as marked

UNESCO World Heritage Site
- Part of: Meteora
- Criteria: Cultural (i, ii, iv, v, vii)
- Reference: 455
- Inscription: 1988 (12th Session)
- Area: 271.87 ha (671.8 acres)
- Buffer zone: 1,884.14 ha (4,655.8 acres)

The Monastery of Saint Stephen (Greek: Μονή Αγίου Στεφάνου, romanized: Moni Agiou Stephanou) is a Greek Orthodox monastery in central Greece, situated in the Pineios Valley northeast of the town of Kalambaka. It is located at the top of a rocky precipice below Kukulas (Κουκουλάς) peak, 510 metres (1,670 ft). It is one of twenty-four monasteries which were originally built at Meteora. (Note: Meteora, translated from Greek, means "suspended in the air".) Completed during the 14th century, the Monastery of the Saint Stephen is one of the oldest existing of the Meteora monasteries. It is also the monastery with the largest number of inhabitants, 31 nuns as of December 2025. Collectively titled Meteora, in 1988 the extant six monasteries were inscribed on the UNESCO World Heritage List.

In 1961, the monastery was converted into a nunnery.

== Geography ==
Twenty-four monasteries were built on rock cliffs in the deltaic plains of Meteora. The cliffs rise to a height of more than 400 metres (1,300 ft); and the Saint Stephen Monastery is sited at a height of 575 metres (1,886 ft) above sea level. The monasteries are situated in the Pineios Valley within the Thessalian plains, close to the town of Kalambaka. The rock cliffs, dated by chemical analysis to be 60-million years old, were created during earthquakes, and are of sandstone and conglomerate formations caused by fluvial erosion. The sediments were once in an inland sea during the Pliocene epoch. The cliffs rose as a cone during the earthquakes, forming steep rock columns, known as "heavenly columns". The area is hilly and forested, with river valleys, and a protected area known as Trikala Aesthetic Forest.

The monasteries of Saint Stephen and Holy Trinity are separated from the main group of other monasteries, which are further to the north.

== History ==
The history of building monasteries on top of perilous cliffs near Meteora occurred between the 14th and 15th centuries. Even prior to this, in the 11th century, religious communities had established hermitages at the foot of these cliffs. In the 14th century, the titular emperor of Serbs and Greeks, John Uroš, became a monk and moved to Meteora; he endowed, rebuilt and established monasteries here. During the political upheavals in the region during this century, monks retreated to the safe haven offered by the cliffs. By end of the fifteenth century, there were 24 such monasteries, such as Saint Stephen, Holy Trinity, Rousanou–Saint Barbara, and St. Nicholas Anapausas.

As of December 2025, four of the original monasteries were occupied, including the Saint Stephen Monastery (Aghios Stephanos), Holy Trinity (Aghia Trias), the Varlaam Monastery, and the Great Meteoron; and together with the Rousanou and St. Nicholas Anapafsas monasteries – extant, yet inactive – make up the UNESCO World Heritage Site, named Meteora; inscribed in 1988.

== Gallery ==
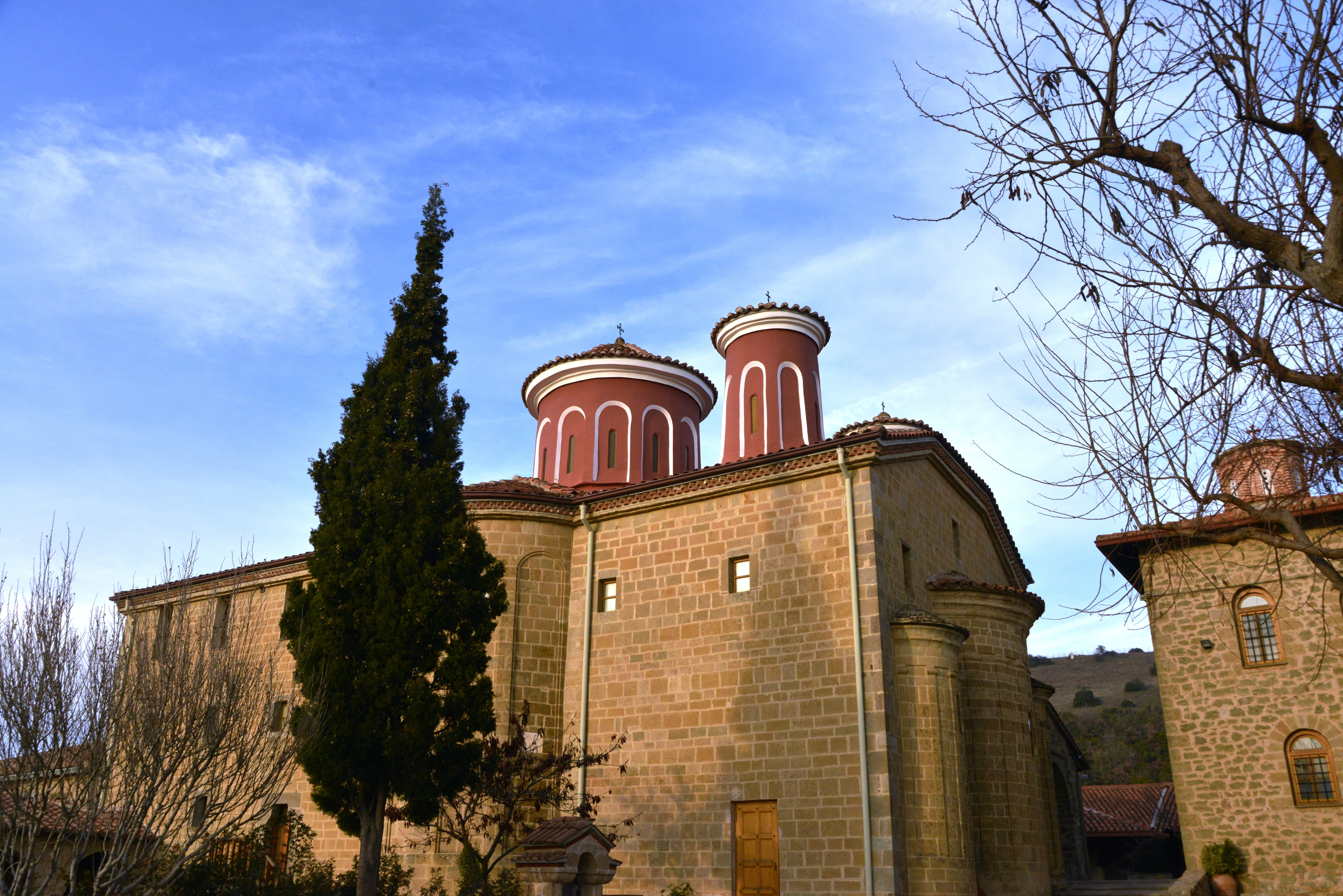
Monastery building

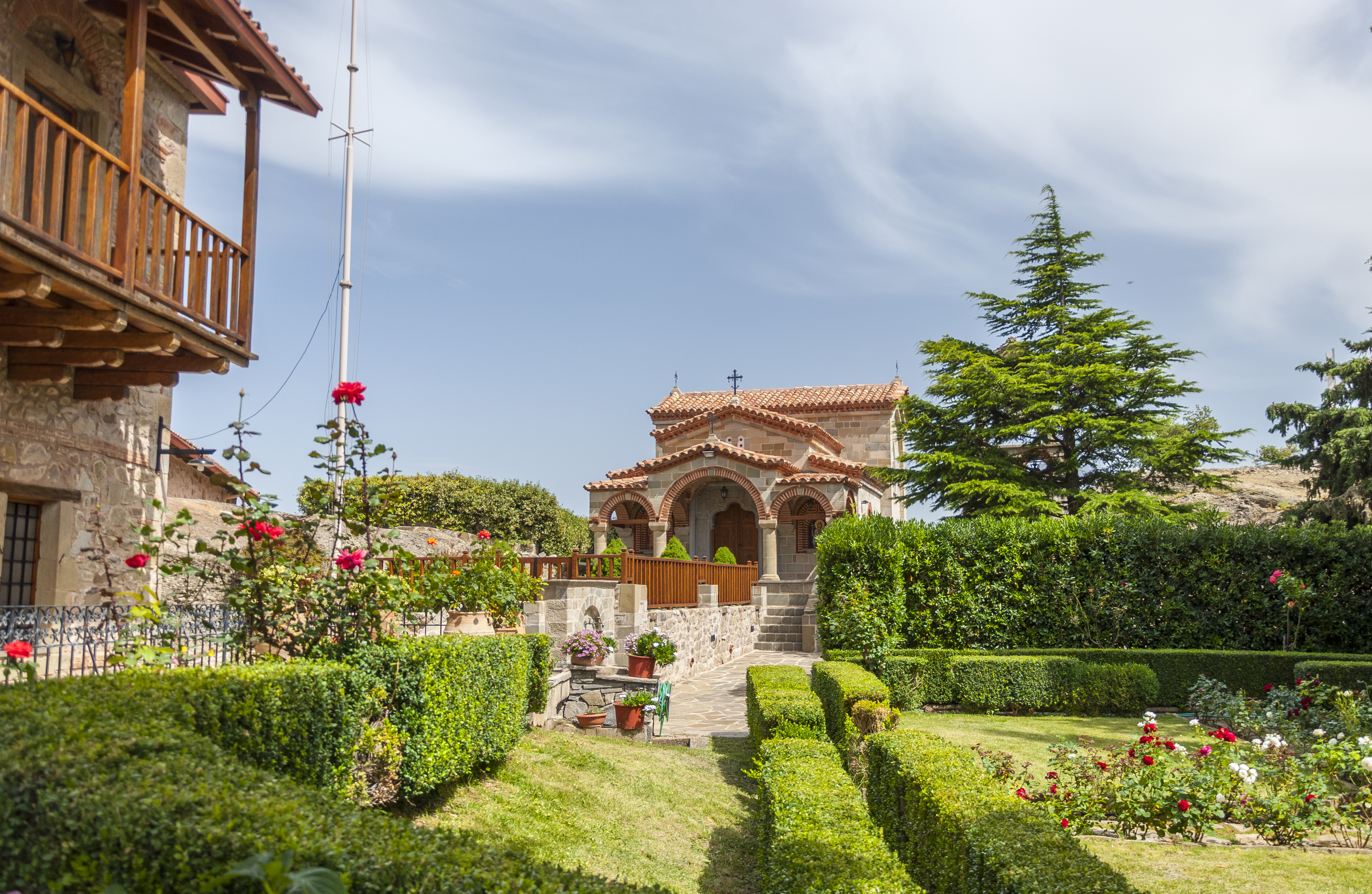
Monastery grounds

== See also ==
- Church of Greece
- List of churches in Greece
- List of Greek Orthodox monasteries in Greece
