= Monastery of the Holy Trinity, Meteora =

Monastery in Kalabaka Municipality, Thessaly Region, Greece

Monastery of the Holy Trinity
- Μονή Αγίας Τριάδος

- Location of the monastery in Greece
- 39°42′48″N 21°38′09″E
- Location: Kalambaka, Pineios Valley, Thessaly
- Country: Greece
- Denomination: Greek Orthodox

History
- Status: Monastery

Architecture
- Functional status: Active
- Architectural type: Monastery
- Style: Byzantine (Athonite)
- Completed: 1476
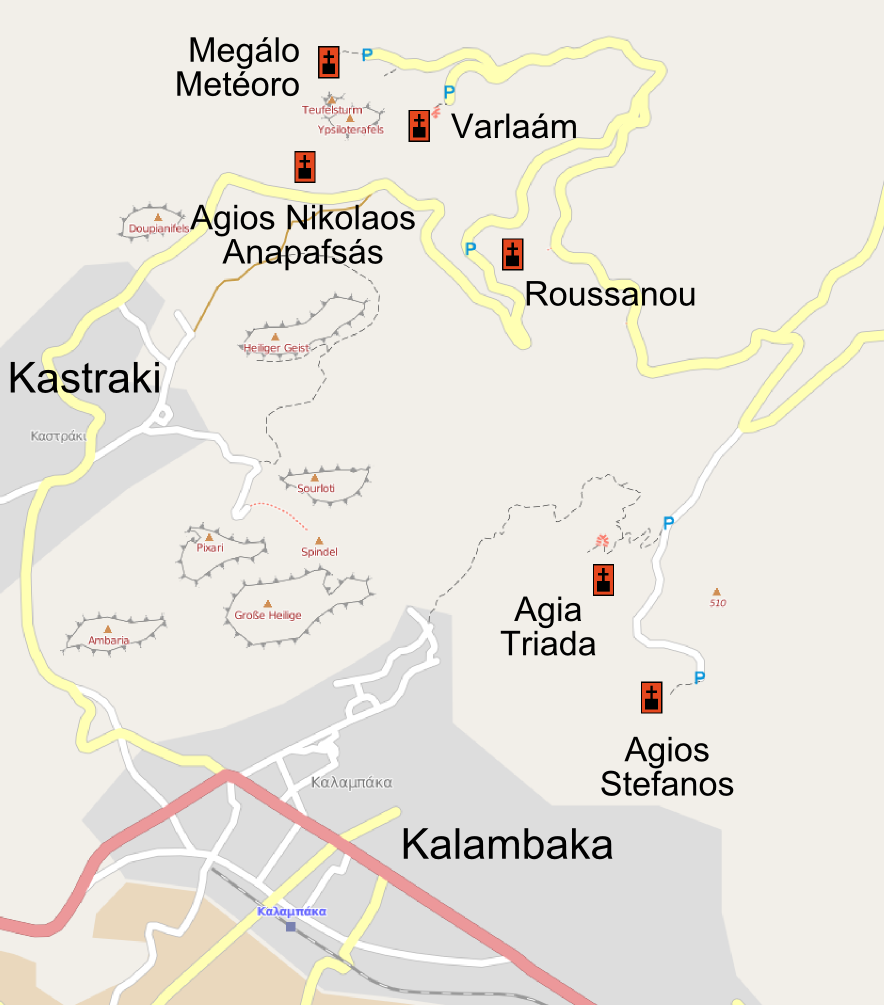
- Map of Meteora, with the six extant monasteries, as marked

UNESCO World Heritage Site
- Part of: Meteora
- Criteria: Cultural (i, ii, iv, v, vii)
- Reference: 455
- Inscription: 1988 (12th Session)
- Area: 271.87 ha (671.8 acres)
- Buffer zone: 1,884.14 ha (4,655.8 acres)

The Monastery of the Holy Trinity (Greek: Μονή Αγίας Τριάδος), also known as Agia Triada, Ayías Triádhos, Ayia Triada (all meaning "Holy Trinity"), is a Greek Orthodox monastery in central Greece, situated in the Pineios Valley northeast of the town of Kalambaka. It is located at the top of a rocky precipice over 400 metres (1,300 ft) high and is one of 24 monasteries which were originally built at Meteora. (Note: Meteora, translated from Greek, means "suspended in the air".) The Monastery of the Holy Trinity is one of the oldest existing of the Meteora monasteries. Collectively titled Meteora, in 1988 the extant six monasteries were inscribed on the UNESCO World Heritage List.

A church was constructed in the monastery compound between the fourteenth and fifteenth centuries.

== Geography ==
Twenty-four monasteries were built on rock cliffs in the deltaic plains of Meteora. The cliffs rise to a height of more than 400 metres (1,300 ft); and the Holy Trinity Monastery is sited 570 metres (1,870 ft) above sea level. The monasteries are situated in the Pineios Valley within the Thessalian plains, close to the town of Kalambaka. The rock cliffs, dated by chemical analysis to be 60-million years old, were created during earthquakes, and are of sandstone and conglomerate formations caused by fluvial erosion. The sediments were once in an inland sea during the Pliocene epoch. The cliffs rose as a cone during the earthquakes, forming steep rock columns, known as "heavenly columns". The area is hilly and forested, with river valleys, and a protected area known as Trikala Aesthetic Forest.

The monasteries of Saint Stephen and Holy Trinity are separated from the main group of other monasteries, which are further to the north. Prior to the twentieth century, the Holy Trinity Monastery was very difficult to access, and required crossing a valley and climbing through the rock outcrop to reach the building's entrance. Provisions were placed in baskets drawn up by rope-ladders (now with a winch). In present day, one can walk from Kalambaka for 3 kilometres (1.9 mi) along a foot track to reach the monastery, or use a winch-operated lift. There is a road from the back side of the cliff; and the monastery can be accessed via tunnels and 130 steps of stone. The grounds include a 0.8-hectare (2.0-acre) garden at the summit.

To the northeast, there is a chapel (Ιερός Ναός Αγίου Αθανασίου) dedicated to St. Athanasius of Tzertzi (Άγιος Αθανάσιος Τζέρτζης).

== History ==
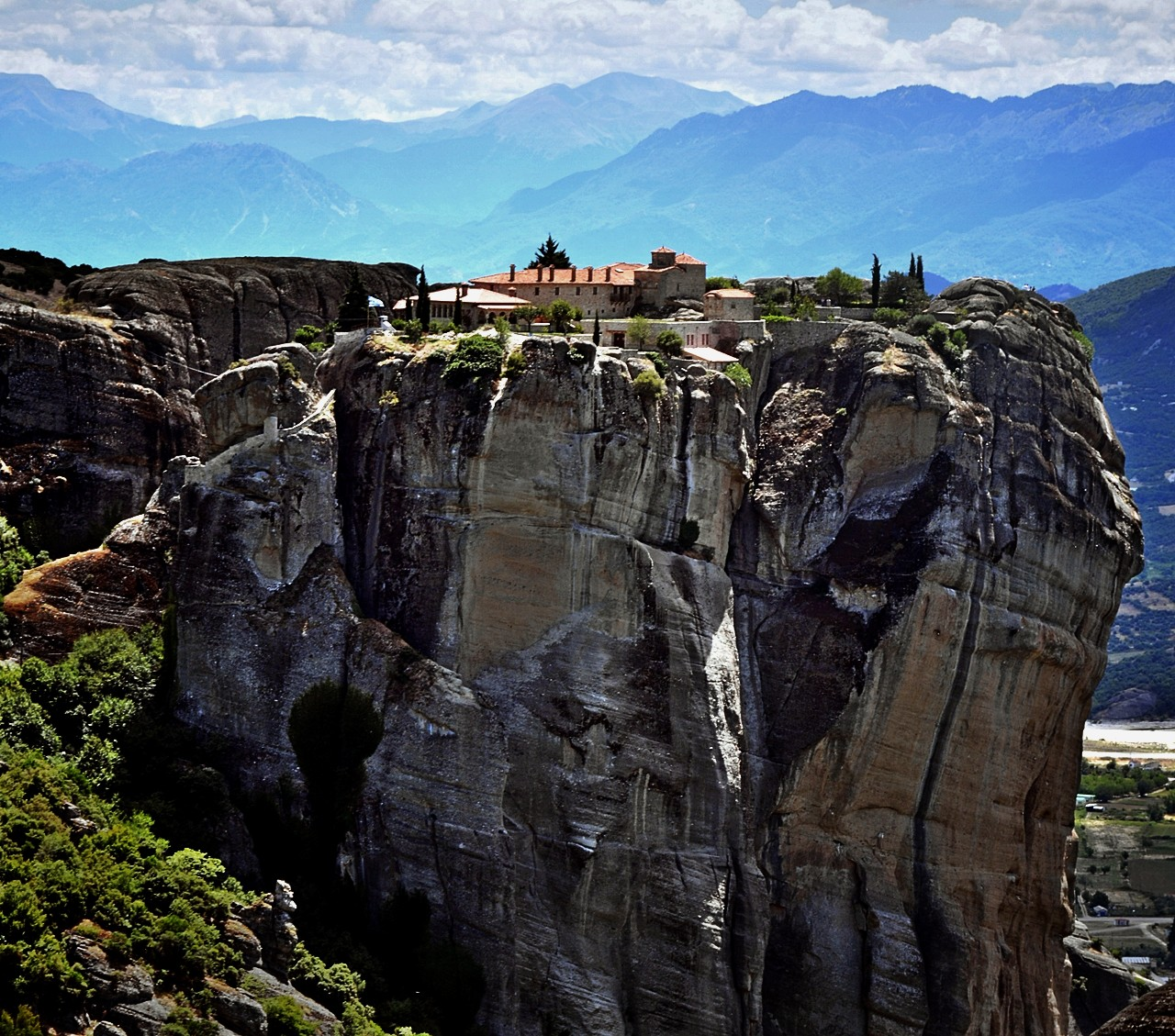
A view

The history of building monasteries on top of perilous cliffs near Meteora occurred between the 14th and 15th centuries. Even prior to this, in the 11th century, religious communities had established hermitages at the foot of these cliffs. In the 14th century, the titular emperor of Serbs and Greeks, John Uroš, became a monk and moved to Meteora; he endowed, rebuilt and established monasteries here. During the political upheavals in the region during this century, monks retreated to the safe haven offered by the cliffs. The monk Dometius was said to be the founder of the monastery, arriving at the site of Holy Trinity in 1438, according to local legend. Holy Trinity according to many sources was built in 1475–1476, though some sources say the construction dates of the monastery and its adjoining chapel, dedicated to St. John the Baptist, are unknown. Holy Trinity's decoration was added in 1741. By end of the fifteenth century, there were 24 such monasteries, such as Holy Trinity, Rousanou–Saint Barbara, and St. Nicholas Anapausas. Damascene, Jonah, and Parthenios, were benefactors and those who took part in restorations; their names grace the monastery walls.

As of December 2025, four of the original monasteries were occupied, including the Holy Trinity Monastery (Aghia Trias), St. Stephen (Aghios Stephanos), the Varlaam Monastery, and the Great Meteoron; and together with the Rousanou and St. Nicholas Anapafsas monasteries – extant, yet inactive – make up the UNESCO World Heritage Site, named Meteora; inscribed in 1988.

== Architecture ==
The church plan is in the form of a cruciform type and has a dome which is supported on two columns. The monastery's main cathedral was constructed in the 15th century and decorated with frescoes in 1741 by two monks. A pseudo-trefoil window is part of the apse. There are white columns and arches, as well as rose-coloured tiles. A small skeuophylakion (a church treasury or chamber for the sacred furnishings entrusted to a skeuophylax) adjoining the church was built in 1684. Its broad esonarthex barrel vault was built in 1689 and embellished in 1692. The small chapel of St. John the Baptist, carved into the rock, contains frescoes from the seventeenth century. It was richly decorated and had precious manuscripts; however, these treasures were looted during World War II, when it was occupied by the Germans. The building's sixteenth-century frescoes are reported to be post-Byzantine paintings. A fresco of St Sisois and the skeleton of Alexander the Great adorns the walls.

== Monastic life ==
At one time, fifty monks lived at Holy Trinity, but by the early twentieth century, there were only five. Visitors are allowed. Patrick Leigh Fermor is reported to have visited the monasteries here several decades ago, as a guest of the Abbot of Varlaam. Even then, Holy Trinity was one of the poorest monasteries in Meteora.

== In popular culture ==
The monastery was featured in the 1981 James Bond film For Your Eyes Only. It features in the climax to the film where Bond ascends the rock cliff and intrudes upon Aristotle Kristatos and Erich Kriegler to retrieve the ATAC decoder stolen from the British. Aristotle Kristatos, played by Julian Glover, was using the monastery in the film as a hideout. Eventually Bond throws the ATAC decoder off the cliff top when the KGB arrive to capture it.

The monastery also features in the 1961 film Tintin and the Golden Fleece.

The 1957 film Boy on a Dolphin is partly shot in Meteora. Clifton Webb's character visits Meteora, and goes up to the Holy Trinity monastery to do some library research.

== Gallery ==
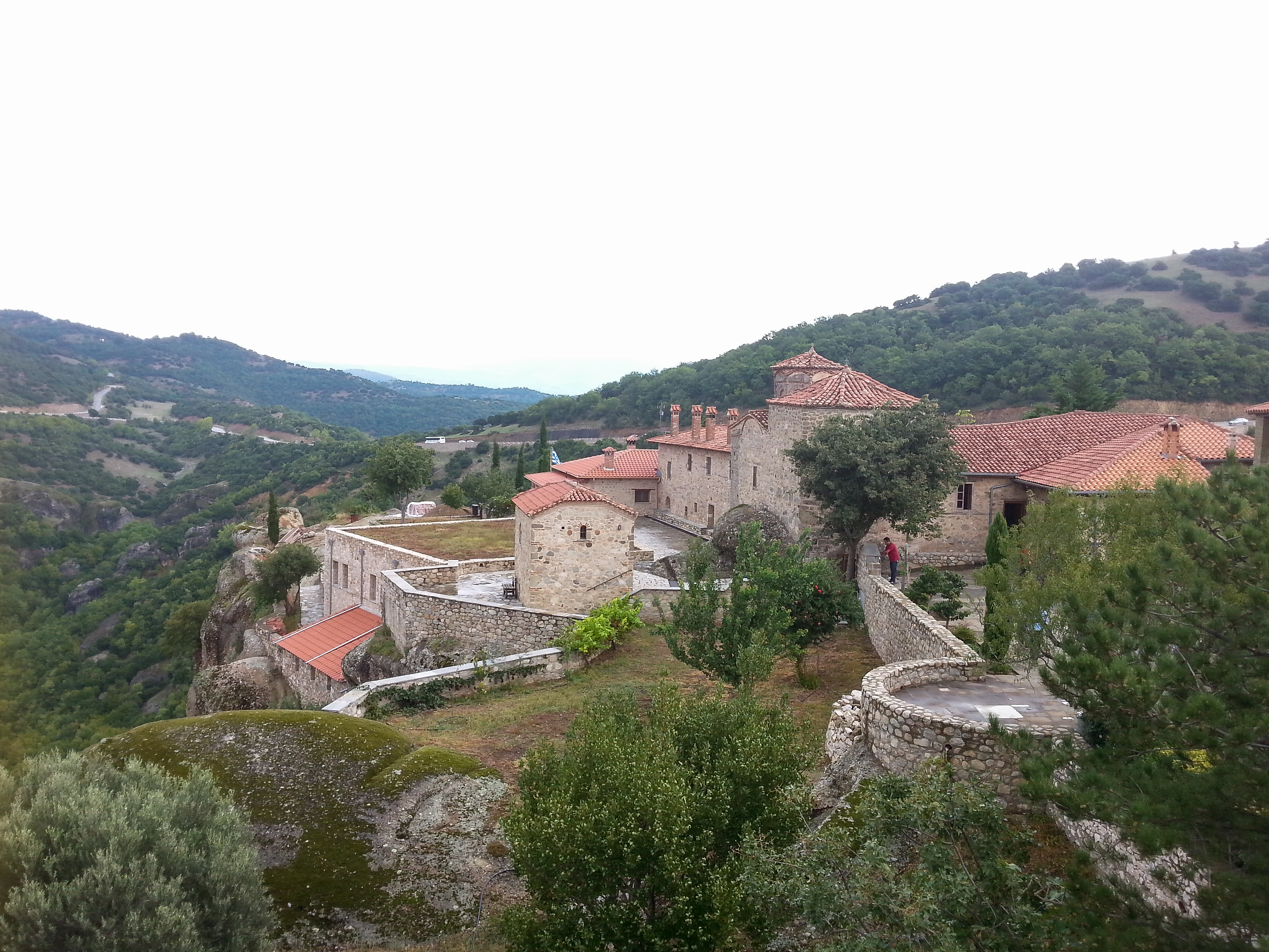
Holy Trinity complex in Meteora

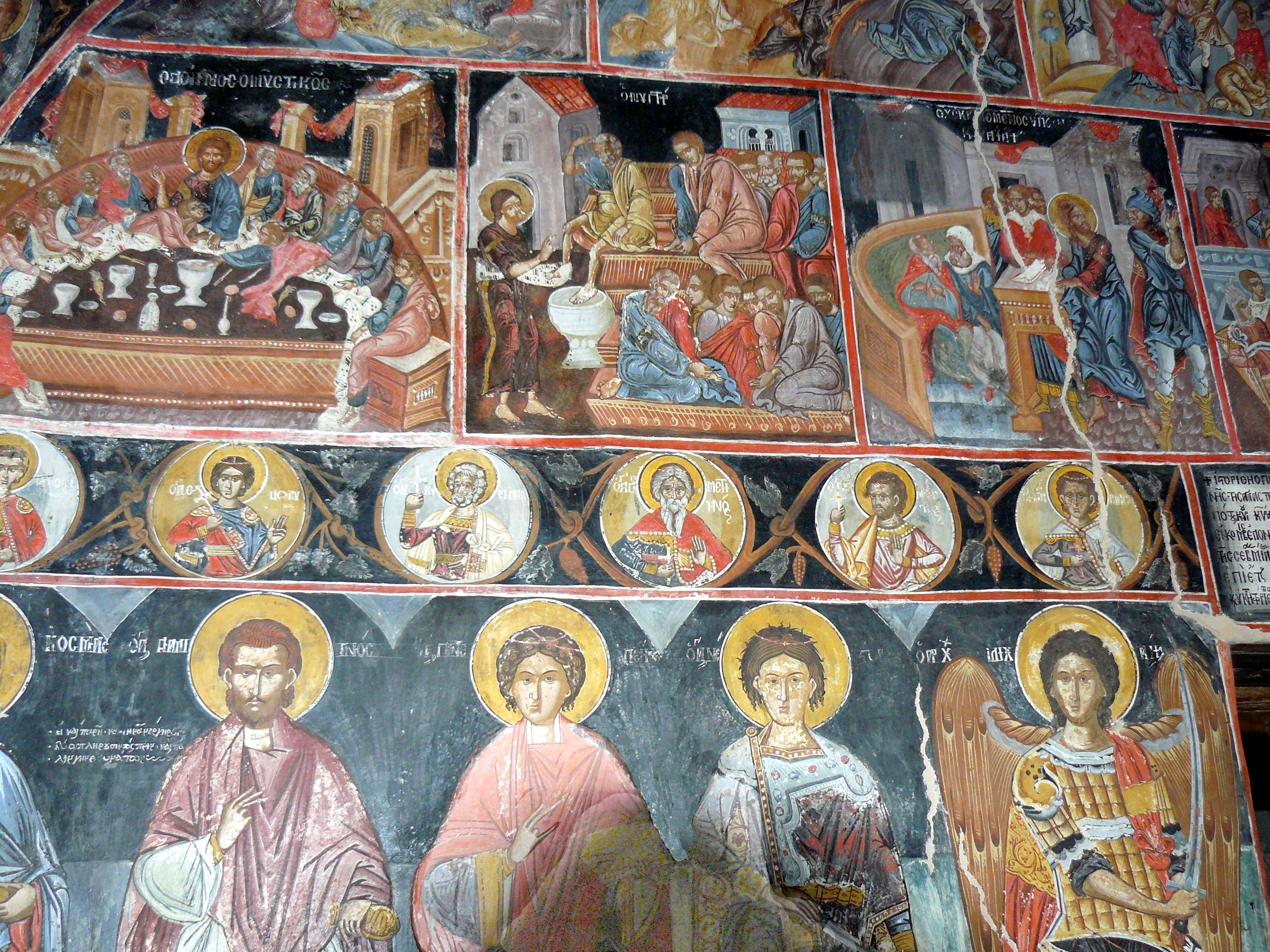
Frescos inside the monastery

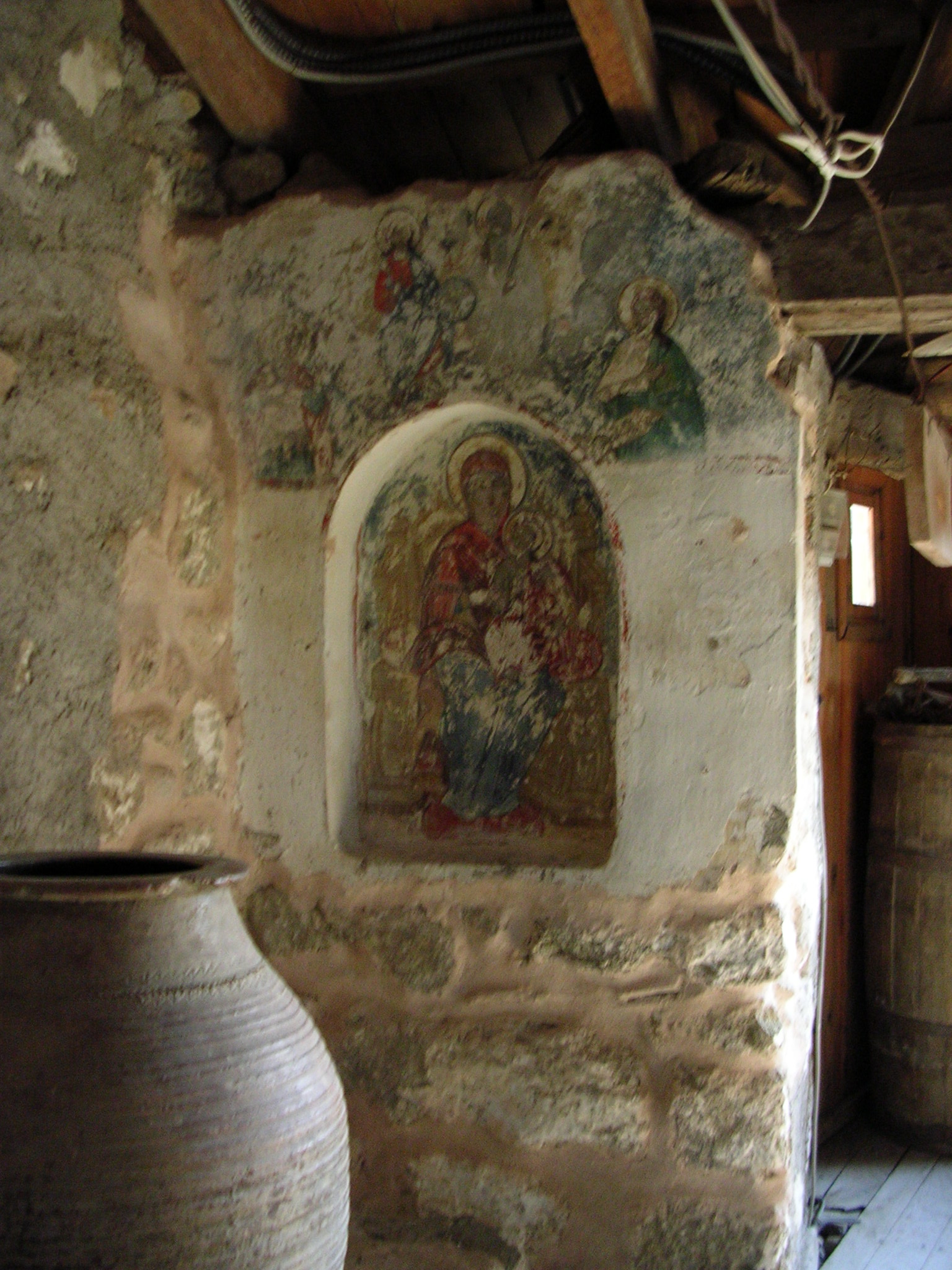
Fresco

== See also ==
- Church of Greece
- List of churches in Greece
- List of Greek Orthodox monasteries in Greece
