= Athanasius the Meteorite =

Greek Orthodox Christian monk

Saint Athanasius the Meteorite
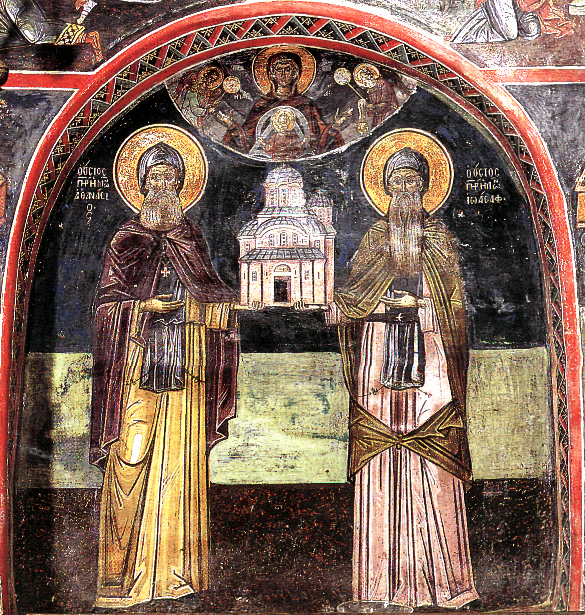
- Fresco at the Monastery of Great Meteoron depicting Athanasius (left), with his successor Joasaph (right).

Athanasius the Meteorite
- Born: Andronikos; 1302
- Hometown: New Patras, Greece
- Residence: Meteora, Greece
- Died: 1380; Meteora, Greece
- Venerated in: Eastern Orthodox Church
- Feast: 20 April
- Influences: Gregory of Sinai
- Tradition or genre: Athonite Monasticism, Hesychasm

Athanasius the Meteorite (Greek: Αθανάσιος ο Μετεωρίτης; 1302–1380) was a 14th-century Christian monk. He is canonized as a saint by the Eastern Orthodox Church. His feast day is celebrated on April 20. He is best known as the founder of the monastery of the Great Meteoron in Meteora, Greece.

== Early life ==
He was born in New Patras (the current village of Ypati in Phthiotida) in 1302 or 1303. During his baptism, he received the name of Andronikos. It is assumed that he came from a wealthy noble family although he never spoke of his origins. While he was still young, he was orphaned and taken in by his uncle. However, around 1319, the city was invaded by the Catalan troops of Alfonso Fadrique of Aragon and fell into the hands of the Duchy of Athens. Andronikos and his uncle then left to take refuge in Thessalonika.

Although his family had few resources, local teachers were impressed by Andronikos's enthusiasm for studies. They gave him lessons in philosophy and classical literature without asking for tuition fees. A few years later, he went to Mount Athos. He asked to become a monk there but was refused since he was too young.

== Beginning of monastic life ==
He then went on a pilgrimage to Constantinople and met Gregory of Sinai and Isidore Buchiras (Isidore I of Constantinople), who encouraged him in his quest for monasticism. He then went to Crete, where he began to lead an ascetic life and became locally well known as an ascetic. In order to avoid falling into pride, he left Crete and returned to Mount Athos. There he settled in an isolated skete with a harsh climate, where he became a disciple of two very experienced monks. It was in this skete that he became a monk at the age of 30 years. At that time, he took on the monastic name of Athanasius.

== Arrival in Meteora ==
At that time, Mount Athos was regularly attacked by Turkish pirates. The monks were forced to leave their skete and had to disperse. Athanasius left Mount Athos with two other monks and went in search of an isolated place to practice asceticism. After several attempts, a disciple of Gregory of Sinai, who had become a bishop, advised them to go to Thessaly, in the region of Meteora, where hermits had already been living since the 11th century. Athanasius saw that the peaks of Meteora were ideal for monasticism, and they decided to settle on the top of a rock where a rock-carved chapel had already existed. The monk Gregory became the higoumen of the small community, which was soon joined by other monks.

Athanasius led a very rigorous life there, practicing asceticism and hesychasm. He withdrew five days a week to a cave where he remained alone in continuous prayer, fasting and sleeping very little. He was said to have acquired clairvoyance and experienced spiritual ecstasy, of which he did not speak to the other monks. Later, Athanasius asked Gregory for permission to move to the highest rock of Meteora. Gregory hesitated because he wanted to make Athanasius his successor, but he finally agreed.

== The Monastery of the Transfiguration ==
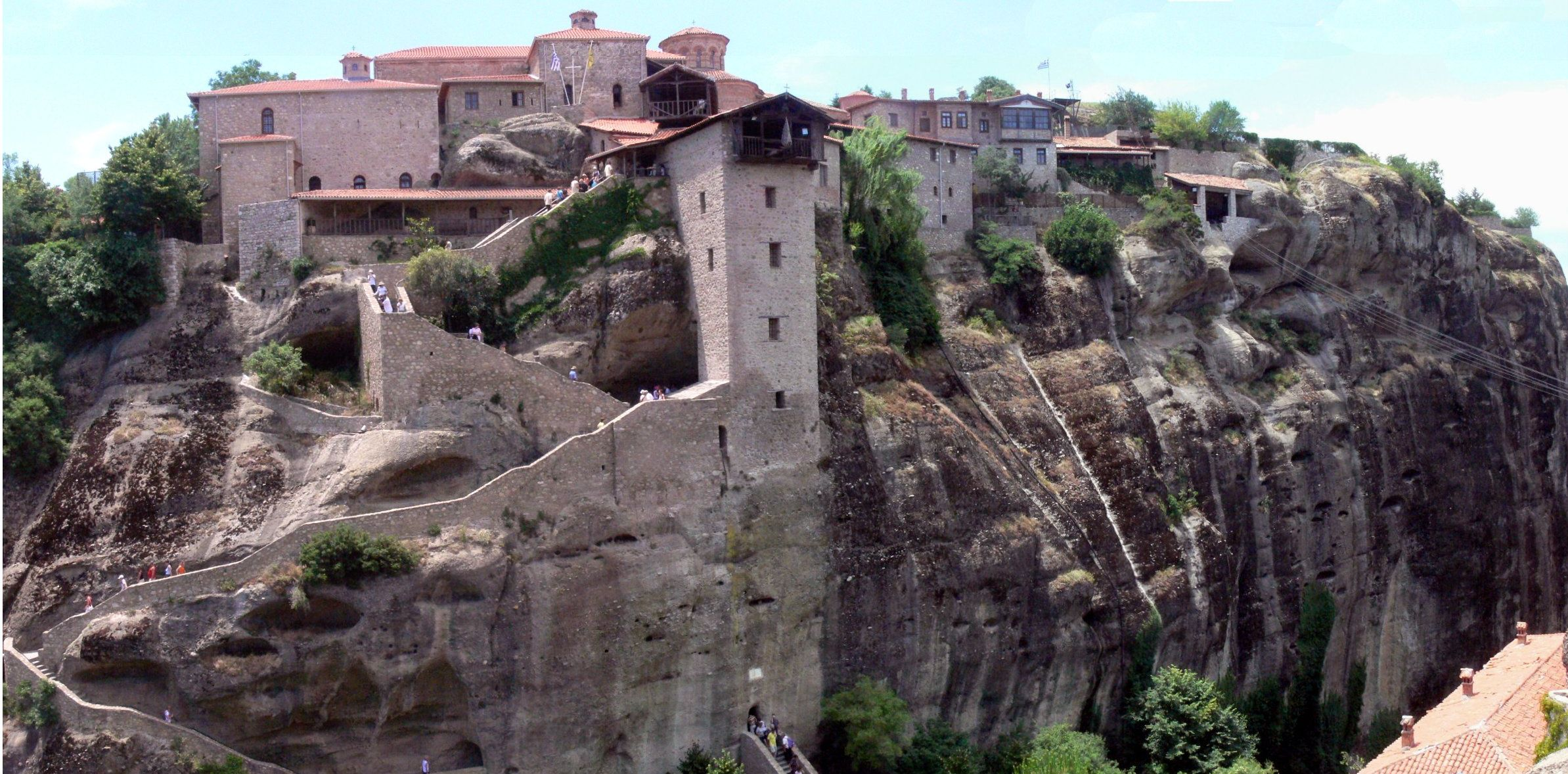
The Monastery of Great Meteoron

Athanasius therefore left for the highest rock, called the "Meteor," and accepted with him only those monks who were most capable of leading a very austere life. In 1356, he organized the community by giving it a cenobitic monastic rule, following the Typikon of the monasteries of Mount Athos. A church was built and dedicated to the Transfiguration of the Lord. The foundation of the monastic community was protected and sponsored by the local lord Simeon Uroš, based in nearby Trikala, who that same year proclaimed himself Emperor of Serbs and Greeks following the death of Stefan Dušan. This monastery later also became known as the Monastery of Great Meteoron. It attracted many monks, and its fame spread throughout Christians in the broader region. It was also said that Athanasius had acquired the gift of prophecy and predicted the failed siege of Thessalonika by the Ottomans in 1372. He died in 1380.

== Sites ==
The ruins of a hermitage said to be inhabited by St. Athanasius the Meteorite (39.717172°N 21.622431°E) are located at the southwestern end of the Holy Spirit Rock in Meteora. The Cave of St. Athanasius the Meteorite (39.724027°N 21.627965°E) is located next to the Holy Monastery, situated midway between the Monastery of Varlaam and Monastery of St. Nicholas Anapausas.
