= Monastery of Great Meteoron =

Monastery in Thessaly, Greece

- Μεγάλο Μετέωρο
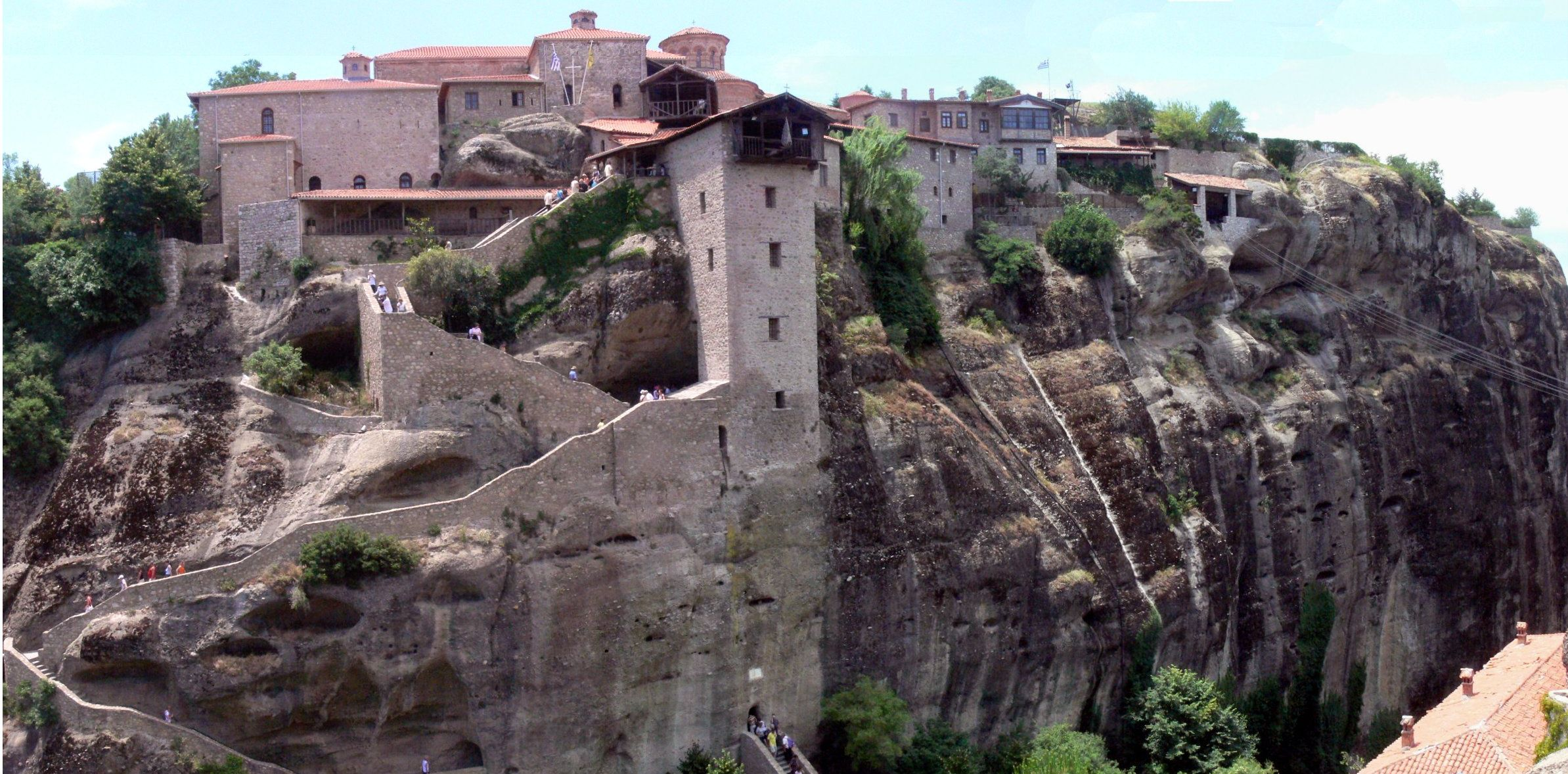

- Location of the monastery in Greece
- 39°43′26″N 21°37′28″E
- Location: Kalambaka, Pineios Valley, Thessaly
- Country: Greece
- Denomination: Greek Orthodox

History
- Status: Monastery
- Founder: Athanasius the Meteorite

Architecture
- Functional status: Active
- Architectural type: Monastery
- Style: Byzantine (Athonite)
- Completed: 1356
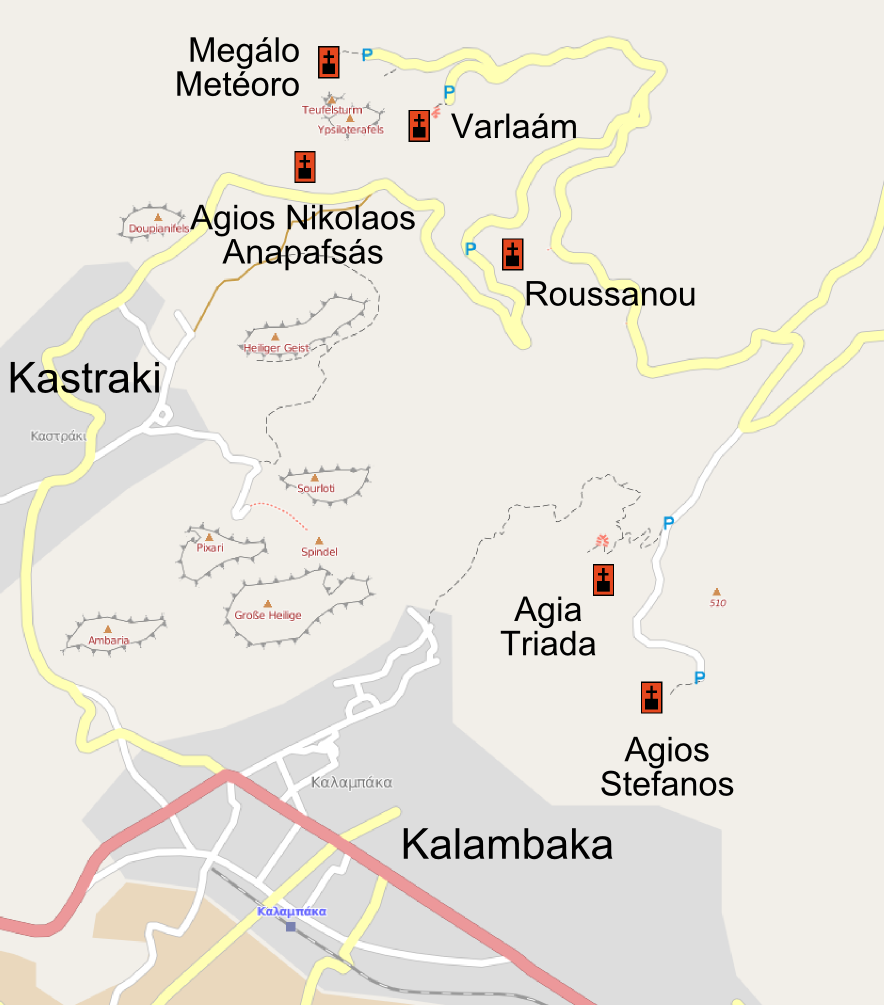
- Map of Meteora, with the six extant monasteries, as marked

UNESCO World Heritage Site
- Part of: Meteora
- Criteria: Cultural (i, ii, iv, v, vii)
- Reference: 455
- Inscription: 1988 (12th Session)
- Area: 271.87 ha (671.8 acres)
- Buffer zone: 1,884.14 ha (4,655.8 acres)

The Monastery of Great Meteoron (Greek: Μεγάλο Μετέωρο), mainly known as Monastery of the Transfiguration of the Saviour (Greek: Μονή της Μεταμόρφωσης του Σωτήρος) in Greece, is a Greek Orthodox monastery near the town of Kalambaka, in the Thessaly region of central Greece. It is located at the top of a rocky precipice over 415 metres (1,362 ft) above the Pineios valley floor. It is one of twenty-four monasteries that were originally built at Meteora. (Note: Meteora, translated from Greek, means "suspended in the air".) The Monastery of the Great Meteoron is one of the oldest existing of the Meteora monasteries. Collectively titled Meteora, in 1988 the extant six monasteries were inscribed on the UNESCO World Heritage List.

== Geography ==
Twenty-four monasteries were built on rock cliffs in the deltaic plains of Meteora. The cliffs rise to a height of more than 400 metres (1,300 ft); and the Great Meteoron Monastery is sited 613 metres (2,011 ft) above sea level. The monasteries are situated in the Pineios Valley within the Thessalian plains, close to the town of Kalambaka. The rock cliffs, dated by chemical analysis to be 60-million years old, were created during earthquakes, and are of sandstone and conglomerate formations caused by fluvial erosion. The sediments were once in an inland sea during the Pliocene epoch. The cliffs rose as a cone during the earthquakes, forming steep rock columns, known as "heavenly columns". The area is hilly and forested, with river valleys, and a protected area known as Trikala Aesthetic Forest.

Most of the monasteries were located near the Great Meteoron Monastery; however, both the monasteries of Saint Stephen and Holy Trinity are located further to the south.

== History ==
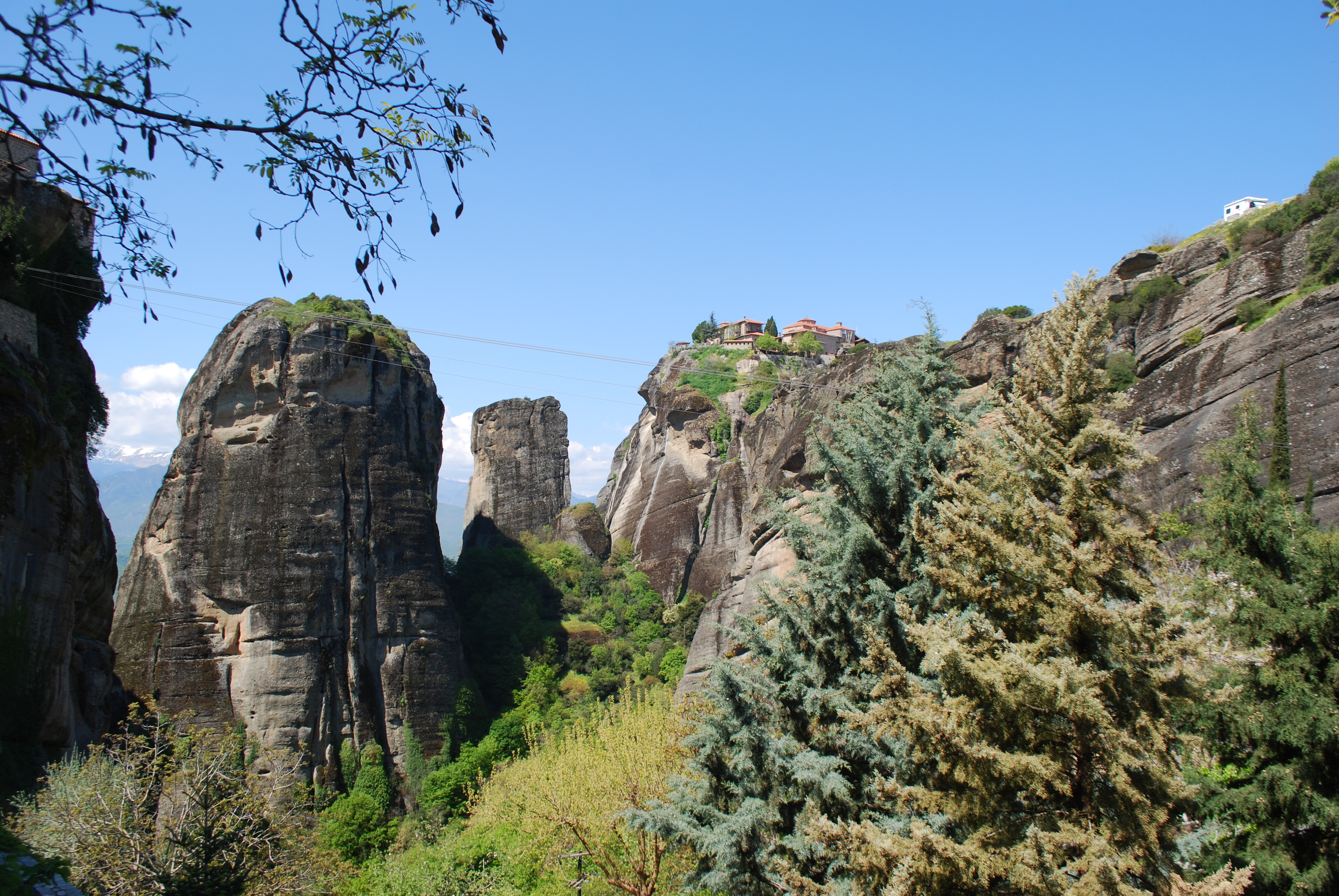
From right to left: the Great Meteoron, the Devil's Tower, Ypsilotera, and a partial view of the Monastery of St. Nicholas Anapausas

The history of building monasteries on top of perilous cliffs near Meteora occurred between the 14th and 15th centuries. Even prior to this, in the 11th century, religious communities had established hermitages at the foot of these cliffs. In the 14th century, the titular emperor of Serbs and Greeks, John Uroš, became a monk and moved to Meteora; he endowed, rebuilt and established monasteries here. During the political upheavals in the region during this century, monks retreated to the safe haven offered by the cliffs. By end of the fifteenth century, there were 24 such monasteries, such as Great Meteoron, Rousanou–Saint Barbara, and St. Nicholas Anapausas.

The Monastery of Great Meteoron was founded by Athanasius the Meteorite in 1356, sponsored by the local lord Simeon Uroš, based in nearby Trikala, who that same year proclaimed himself Emperor of Serbs and Greeks following the death of Stefan Dušan. During the ensuing century the region fell under the rule of the Ottoman Empire, which lasted until the 1881 Convention of Constantinople by which Thessaly was taken over by the Kingdom of Greece.

As of December 2025, four of the original monasteries were occupied, including the Great Meteoron, Holy Trinity (Aghia Trias), St. Stephen (Aghios Stephanos), and the Varlaam Monastery; and together with the Rousanou and St. Nicholas Anapafsas monasteries – extant, yet inactive – make up the UNESCO World Heritage Site, named Meteora; inscribed in 1988.

Emilianos (Vafidis) was the abbot of the Monastery of Great Meteoron from 1961 to 1973, when he moved to Simonopetra and became the abbot there. His disciple Alexios, later known as Alexios of Xenophontos, then became the abbot of Great Meteoron from 1973 to 1976. In 1976, Alexios moved to Xenophontos Monastery.

=== Library ===
The Great Meteoron has the largest manuscript collection in Meteora. Out of 1,124 codices that were catalogued by N. Veis at the six Meteora monasteries, 610 were recorded at the Great Meteoron.

== Nearby attractions ==
The Devil's Tower (39.7252573°N 21.6266490°E), a large towering rock, is located directly to the south of the monastery. It is next to the ruins of a former monastery on Ypsilotera Rock (39.7248841°N 21.6273571°E).

== See also ==
- Church of Greece
- List of Greek Orthodox monasteries in Greece
- List of libraries in Greece
