= Monastery of Varlaam =

Monastery in Kalabaka Municipality, Thessaly Region, Greece

Monastery of Saint Varlaam
- Μονή Βαρλαάμ
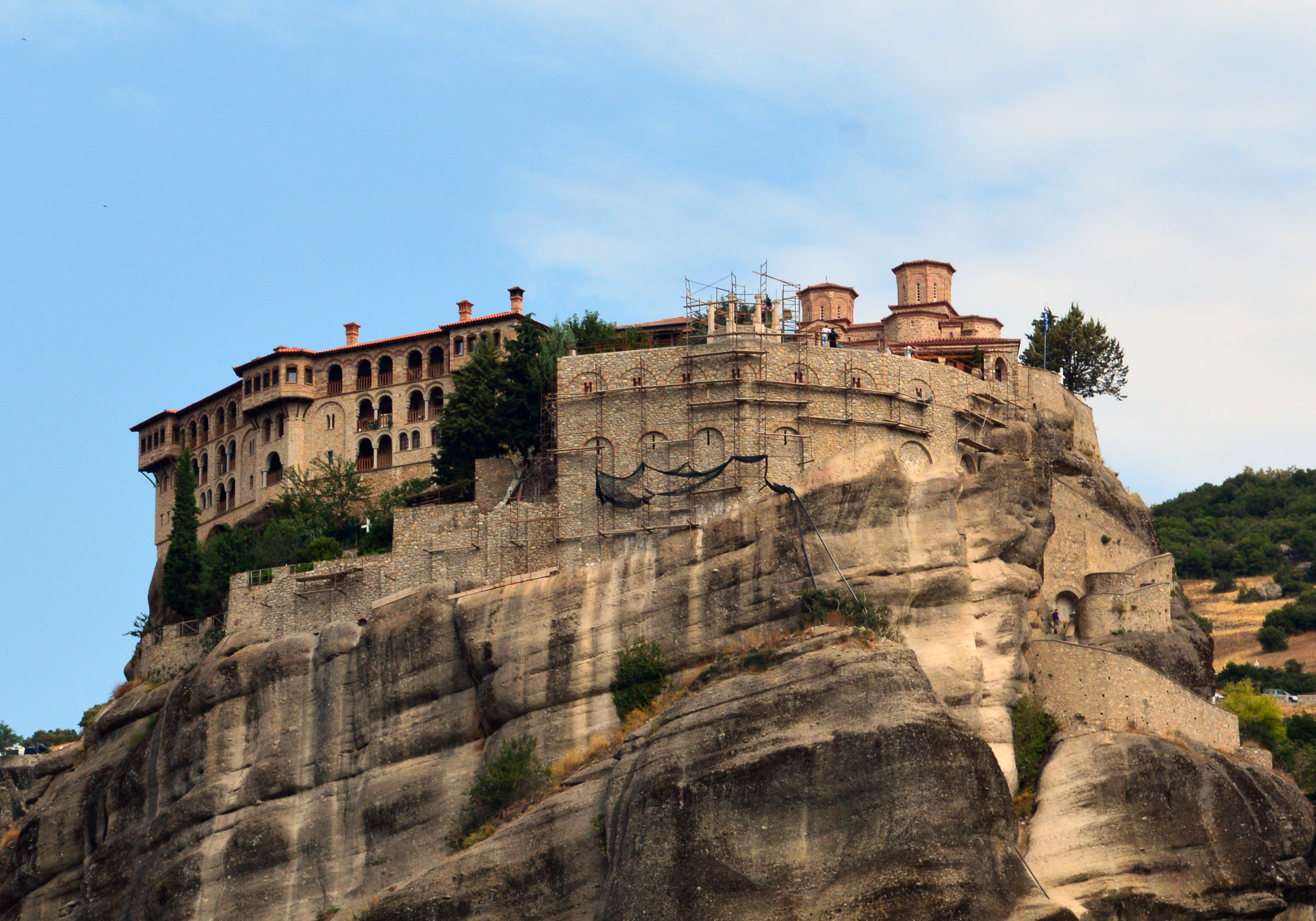

- Location of the monastery in Greece
- 39°42′51″N 21°37′37″E
- Location: Kalambaka, Pineios Valley, Thessaly
- Country: Greece
- Denomination: Greek Orthodox

History
- Status: Monastery

Architecture
- Functional status: Active
- Architectural type: Monastery
- Style: Byzantine (Athonite)
- Completed: 1517
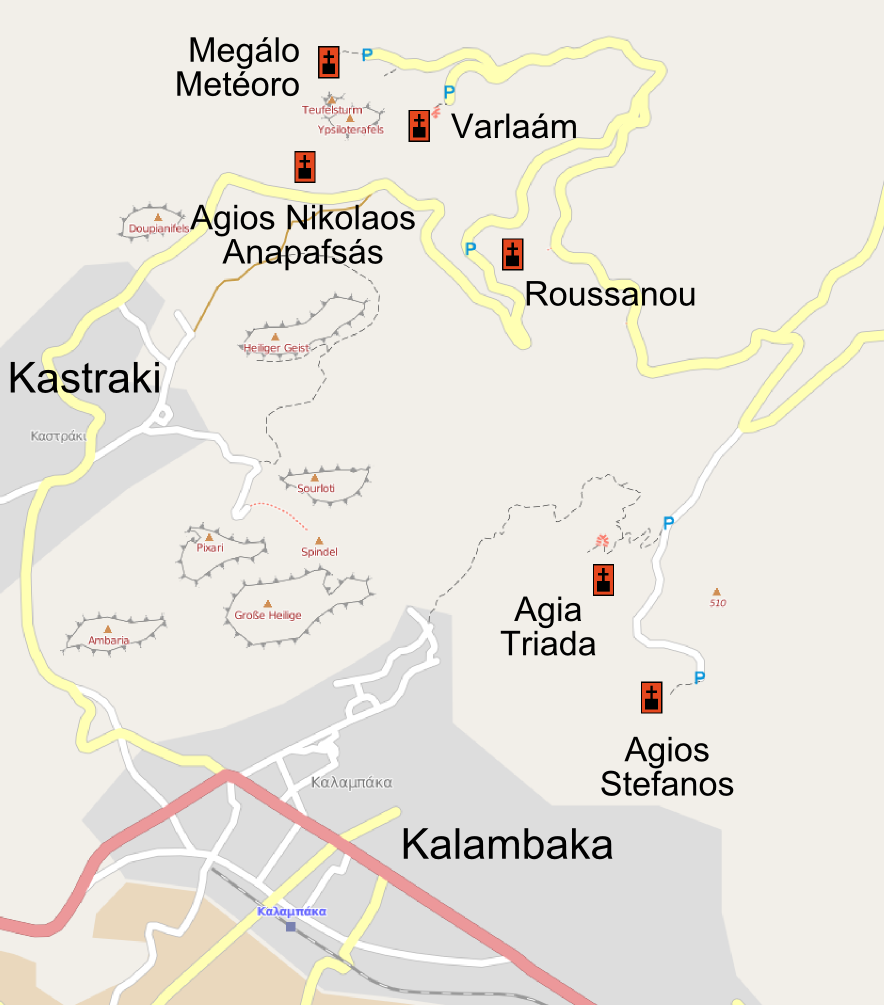
- Map of Meteora, with the six extant monasteries, as marked

UNESCO World Heritage Site
- Part of: Meteora
- Criteria: Cultural (i, ii, iv, v, vii)
- Reference: 455
- Inscription: 1988 (12th Session)
- Area: 271.87 ha (671.8 acres)
- Buffer zone: 1,884.14 ha (4,655.8 acres)

The Monastery of Saint Varlaam (Greek: Μονή Βαρλαάμ) is a Greek Orthodox monastery in central Greece, situated in the Pineios Valley northeast of the town of Kalambaka. It is located at the top of a rocky precipice that is 373 metres (1,224 ft) above the valley floor. Founded in 1517, it is one of twenty-four monasteries which were originally built at Meteora. (Note: Meteora, translated from Greek, means "suspended in the air".) Collectively titled Meteora, in 1988 the extant six monasteries were inscribed on the UNESCO World Heritage List.

== Geography ==
Twenty-four monasteries were built on rock cliffs in the deltaic plains of Meteora. The cliffs rise to a height of more than 400 metres (1,300 ft); and the Varlaam Monastery is sited 595 metres (1,952 ft) above sea level. The monasteries are situated in the Pineios Valley within the Thessalian plains, close to the town of Kalambaka. The rock cliffs, dated by chemical analysis to be 60-million years old, were created during earthquakes, and are of sandstone and conglomerate formations caused by fluvial erosion. The sediments were once in an inland sea during the Pliocene epoch. The cliffs rose as a cone during the earthquakes, forming steep rock columns, known as "heavenly columns". The area is hilly and forested, with river valleys, and a protected area known as Trikala Aesthetic Forest.

Most of the monasteries were located near the Great Meteoron Monastery; however, both the monasteries of Saint Stephen and Holy Trinity are located further to the south.

== History ==
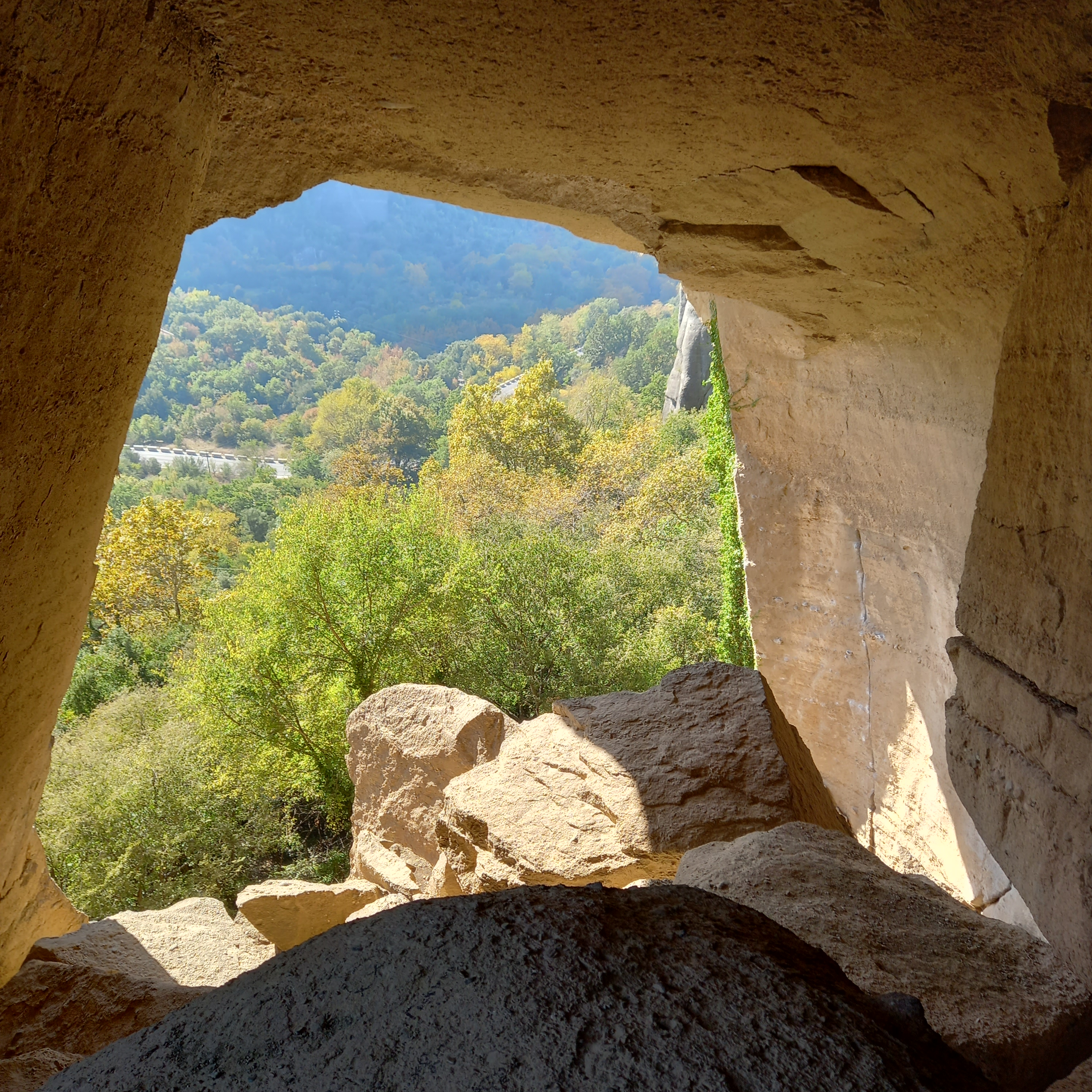
Dragon's Cave, under Varlaam Rock

The history of building monasteries on top of perilous cliffs near Meteora occurred between the 14th and 15th centuries. Even prior to this, in the 11th century, religious communities had established hermitages at the foot of these cliffs. In the 14th century, the titular emperor of Serbs and Greeks, John Uroš, became a monk and moved to Meteora; he endowed, rebuilt and established monasteries here. During the political upheavals in the region during this century, monks retreated to the safe haven offered by the cliffs. By end of the fifteenth century, there were 24 such monasteries, such as Varlaam, Rousanou–Saint Barbara, and St. Nicholas Anapausas.

As of December 2025, four of the original monasteries were occupied, including the Varlaam Monastery, Holy Trinity (Aghia Trias), St. Stephen (Aghios Stephanos), and the Great Meteoron; and together with the Rousanou and St. Nicholas Anapafsas monasteries – extant, yet inactive – make up the UNESCO World Heritage Site, named Meteora; inscribed in 1988.

== Nearby attractions ==
The Dragon Cave (Greek: Δρακοσπηλιά, romanized: Drakospiliá) is located to the south, below the monastery.

== See also ==
- Church of Greece
- List of Greek Orthodox monasteries in Greece
