= Sisoes the Great =

Egyptian early Christian saint

Saint Sisoes the Great
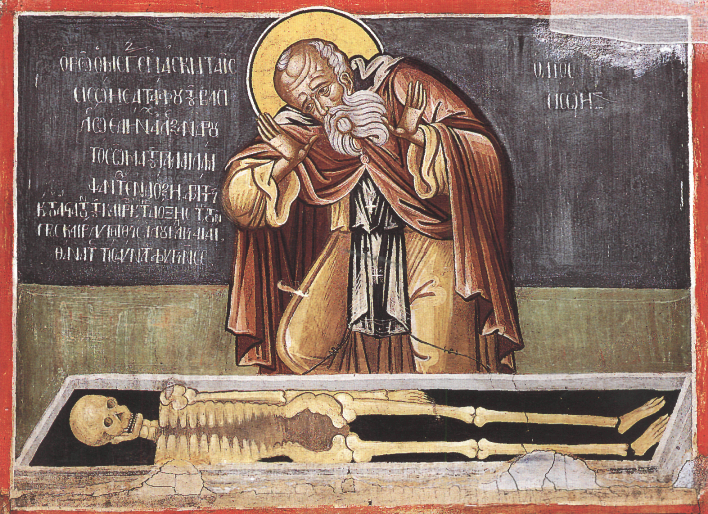
- Saint Sisoës the Great at the tomb of Alexander the Great (16th century, Varlaam Monastery, Meteora), signifying the remembrance of death (Memento mori) (Note: Concerning the icon of St. Sisoës staring over the dead bones of Alexander the Great, we do not know for sure if this depicts a historical event. We do not have a historical account of what the icon describes until its depiction first starts appearing in monasteries in Greece following the Fall of Constantinople in 1453. The most famous examples come from the Holy Trinity Monastery and Varlaam Monastery at Meteora, and at Hosios Loukas. It is not implausible that the depiction of Sisoës lamenting over the tomb of Alexander is a historical event lost to us in document form but survives only in iconography. Sisoës was a contemporary of the events surrounding Emperor's Theodosius' series of decrees outlawing the worship of pagan gods, among whom Alexander was to the fore. In Alexandria, the Christians rioted and destroyed the Serapeum, the leading pagan temple. This is the time that Alexander's remains finally disappear from history.)
- Born: 4th century Egypt
- Died: 429; Egypt
- Venerated in: Oriental Orthodox Churches; Eastern Orthodox Church; Catholic Church
- Feast: July 6

Sisoës the Great (also Sisoi the Great, Sisoy the Great, Sisoes of Sceté or Shishoy; Coptic: ⲁⲡⲁ ϫⲓϫⲱⲓ; died 429 AD) was an Egyptian early Christian desert father, a solitary monk pursuing asceticism in the Egyptian desert in a cave of his predecessor, St Anthony the Great. St Sisoës is revered as a saint by the Roman Catholic Church and the Eastern Orthodox Church, who consider him a wonderworker. His feast day is observed on July 6 [O.S. July 19]. (Note: In some Latin Calendars his feast day was held on July 4.) (Note: Patristic scholar and Roman Catholic theologian Jean-Baptiste Cotelier bestowed much space on Sisoës in his Ecclesiæ Græcæ Monumenta, t. i. 662-678.)

Sisoës was a Copt by birth. Having withdrawn from the world since his youth, he retired to the desert of Sceté, and lived for some time under the direction of his teacher, Abba Or. The desire of finding a retreat yet more unfrequented induced him to cross the Nile and hide himself on Mount Colzim where Anthony the Great had died some time before.

== Sources ==
- This article contains quotations from Sisoes the Great at the Orthodox Wiki, which is available under a Attribution-ShareAlike 2.5 Generic (CC BY-SA 2.5) licence and the GNU Free Documentation License (GFDL) license.
- Venerable Sisoes the Great. OCA - Feasts and Saints.
- Great Synaxaristes (in Greek): Ὁ Ὅσιος Σισώης ὁ Μέγας. 6 Ιουλίου. ΜΕΓΑΣ ΣΥΝΑΞΑΡΙΣΤΗΣ.
- Sisoes the Great and the Contemplation of Death as a Means to True Life in Christ. MYSTAGOGY: The Weblog of John Sanidopoulos. Monday, July 6, 2009.
- (Many incidents from the life of St. Sisoës can be found in the Sayings of the Desert Fathers (Apophthegmata ton Pateron)).
- Rev. Alban Butler (1711–73). St. Sisoes or Sisoy, Anchoret in Egypt. The Lives of the Saints. Volume VII: July. 1866. (Bartleby.com).
- Rev. G.T. Stokes (D.D.). SISOË. In: William Smith and Henry Wace. A Dictionary of Christian Biography, Literature, Sects and Doctrines. Volume IV: Naamanes—Zuntfredus. London: John Murray, Albemarle Street, 1887. p. 705.
- Andrew Chugg. The Quest for the Tomb of Alexander the Great. Lulu.com, 2007.
