= Greek ship Pineios =

Three ships of the Hellenic Navy have borne the name Pineios (Πηνειός), after the Pineios River in Thessaly:

- a steam gunboat in service between 1885–1930
- a minesweeper in service between 1943–1945
- a landing ship in service between 1947–1968
