= John Uroš =

Saint Jovan Uroš Јован Урош
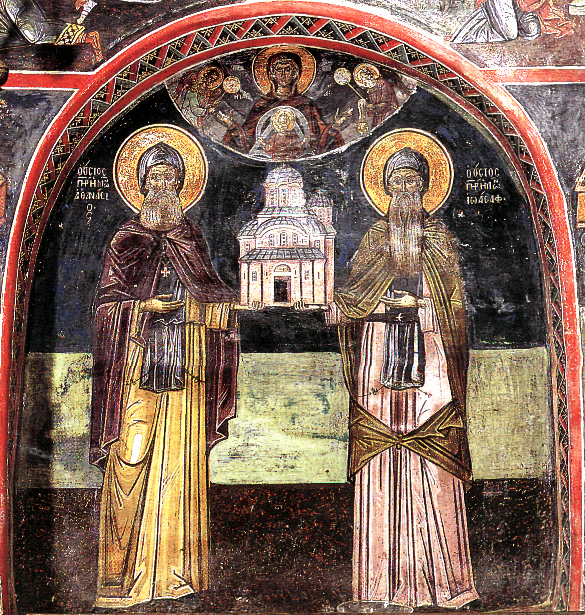
- Fresco of Jovan and Athanasios of Meteora, in Megala Meteora, Greece

Saint
- Venerated in: Eastern Orthodox Church

Emperor of Serbs and Greeks
- Reign: 1370–1373
- Coronation: 1359
- Predecessor: Simeon Uroš
- Died: 1422 or 1423
- Spouse: Daughter of Radoslav Hlapen
- Issue: Constantine, Michael, Demetrios, Asanina, Helena
- House: Nemanjić
- Father: Simeon Uroš
- Mother: Thomais Orsini
- Religion: Serbian Orthodox

Jovan Uroš Nemanjić (Serbian Cyrillic: Јован Урош Немањић) or John Ouresis Doukas Palaiologos or Joasaph of Meteora (Greek: Ιωάννης Ούρεσης Δούκας Παλαιολόγος, romanized: Iōannēs Ouresēs Doúkas Palaiologos), was the ruler of Thessaly from c. 1370 to c. 1373, retiring as a monk for the next half century thereafter. He died in 1422 or 1423. By birth, he was member of the Nemanjić dynasty, ruling family of the Serbian Empire.

== Life ==
John Uroš was the son of Emperor Simeon Uroš by his wife, Thomais Orsini. He was born in 1350 and died in 1422. His paternal grandparents were Stephen Uroš III and Maria Palaiologina His maternal grandparents were John II Orsini and Anna Palaiologina.

Between 1369 and 1372 he succeeded his father as titular emperor of the Serbians and Greeks, although his rule was limited to Thessaly. He may have been associated on the throne by his father as early as 1359/60. After reigning for an uncertain number of years, John Uroš abdicated in favour of his relative, the Caesar Alexios Angelos Philanthropenos, and became a monk.

He joined the monastic community founded by his father at Meteora, where he is documented under his monastic name Joasaph in 1381. Although he had surrendered political power, John Uroš remained wealthy and influential. In 1384–1385 he helped his sister Maria govern Epirus after the murder of her husband Thomas II Preljubović. He endowed the monasteries at Meteora and eventually became the head of the local monastic community, rebuilding or establishing further monasteries in the area in 1388 and 1390. In the 1390s he visited Mount Athos, but was back in Meteora by 1401, and died there in 1422 or 1423.

John Uroš was the last emperor of Serbs and Greeks and the last Serbian ruler of Thessaly. His relative Alexios Angelos Philanthropenos succeeded him and recognized Byzantine suzerainty, and the area was lost to Bayezid I of the Ottoman Empire by his son Manuel Angelos Philanthropenos in 1394. John Uroš had a younger brother named Stefan Uroš, ruler of Pharsalus (sons of Simeon Uroš), who may have held Pharsalos as his fief. Although he died long after his brother became monk, he did not succeed him as ruler of Thessaly.

== Family ==
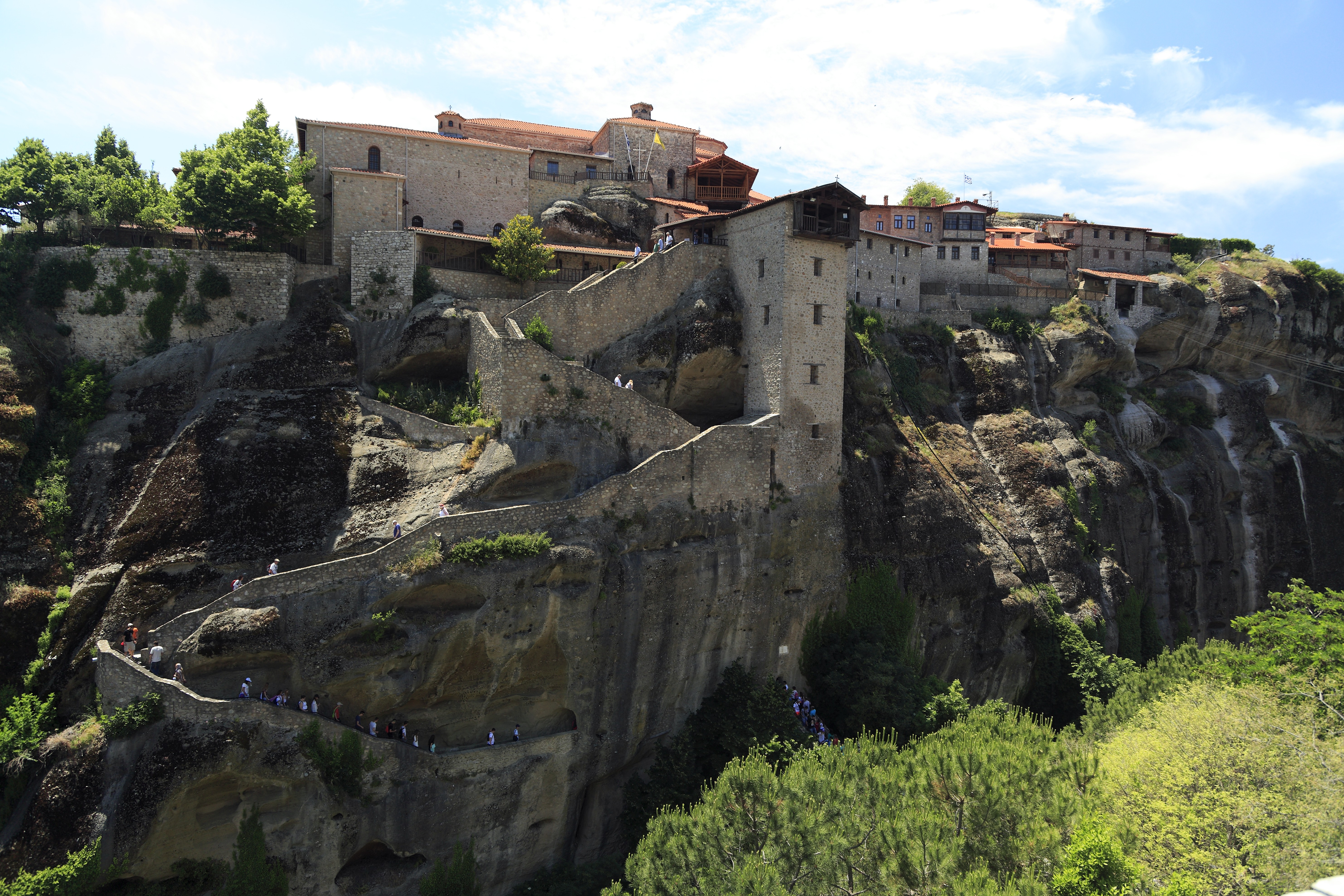
The Monastery of Great Meteoron at Meteora, founded by John Uroš

John Uroš married a daughter of Radoslav Hlapen, a Serbian lord in Macedonia, and his wife, Irina (Irene) Nemanjić. According to the manuscript Dell'Imperadori Constantinopolitani, preserved in the papers of Angelo Masarelli, the father of John's wife was "lord of Drima" ("l Signor Drimi"). John had five children, three sons and two daughters:

- Constantine (Konstantin)
- Michael (Mihajlo)
- Demetrios (Dimitrije)
- Helena (Jelena) Ouresina Palaiologina, who married Theodore Kantakouzenos, with whom she had Irene Kantakouzene
- Asanina

== Sources ==
- Nicolas Cheetham, Mediaeval Greece, Yale University Press, 1981.
- Ferjančić, Božidar (1974). Тесалија у XIII и XIV веку [Thessaly in the 13th and 14th Centuries] (in Serbian). Belgrade: Византолошког институт САНУ.
- Fine, John V. A. (1994) [1987]. The Late Medieval Balkans: A Critical Survey from the Late Twelfth Century to the Ottoman Conquest. Ann Arbor, Michigan: University of Michigan Press. ISBN 978-0-472-10079-8.
- Polemis, Demetrios I. (1968). The Doukai: A Contribution to Byzantine Prosopography. London: The Athlone Press.
- Brook, Lindsay L (1989): "The problematic ascent of Eirene Kantakouzene Brankovic", Studies in Genealogy and Family History in Tribute to Charles Evans, published in Salt Lake City 1989
- Soulis, George C. (1995). The Serbs and Byzantium during the reign of Emperor Stephen Dušan (1331–1355) and his successors. Dumbarton Oaks. ISBN 0-88402-137-8.

Preceded by Simeon Uroš	Ruler of Thessaly (Serbian throne); 1370–1373	Succeeded by Alexios Angelos Philanthropenos (Byzantine Empire)
