= Pineios (Thessaly) =

River in Thessaly, Greece

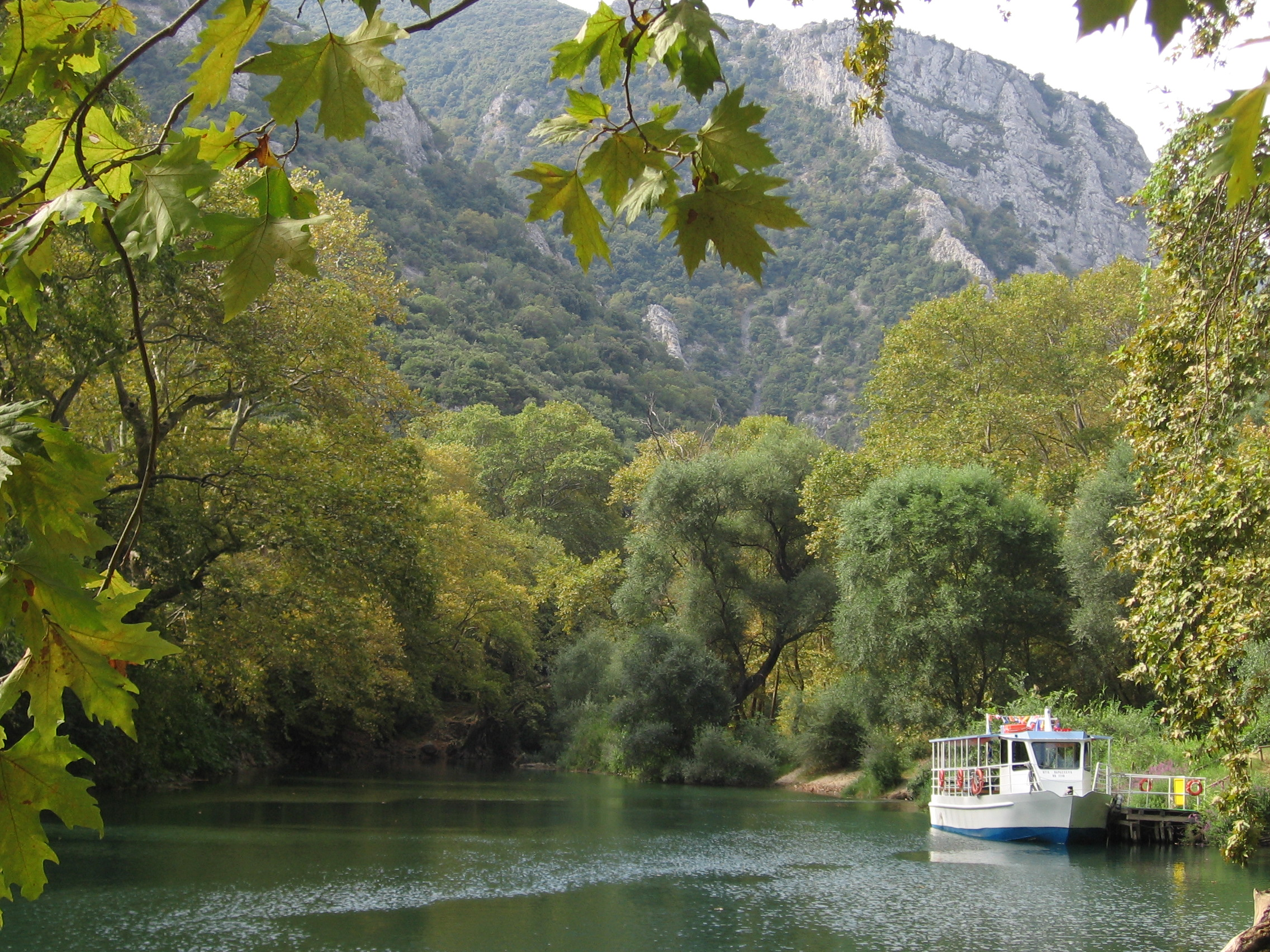
- Vale of Tempe with Pineios flowing through

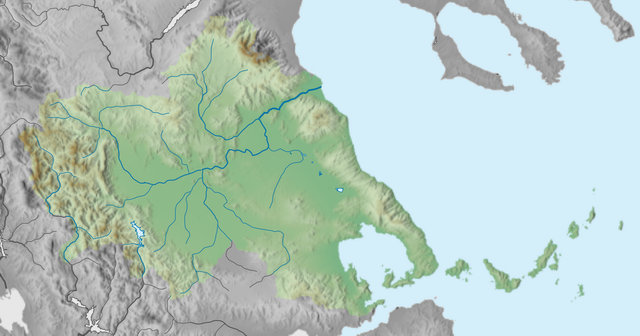

Location
- Country: Greece

Physical characteristics
- Source
  - location: Pindus mountains
- Mouth
  - location: Aegean Sea
  - coordinates: 39°56′3″N 22°43′3″E
- Length: 205 km (127 mi)
- Basin size: 9,500 km^{2} (3,700 sq mi)

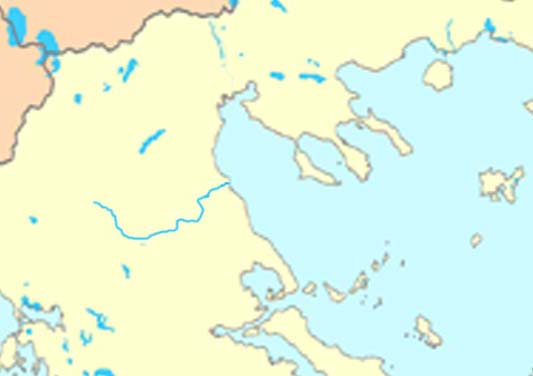

The Pineios (Greek: Πηνειός, romanized: Pineiós, Modern Greek: [pi.ni.ˈos], Ancient Greek: [pɛːnei̯ós], referred to in Latin sources as Peneus) is a river in Thessaly, Greece. The river is named after the god Peneus. During the late Middle Ages, it was also known as the Salamvrias or Salavrias (Σαλα[μ]βριάς).

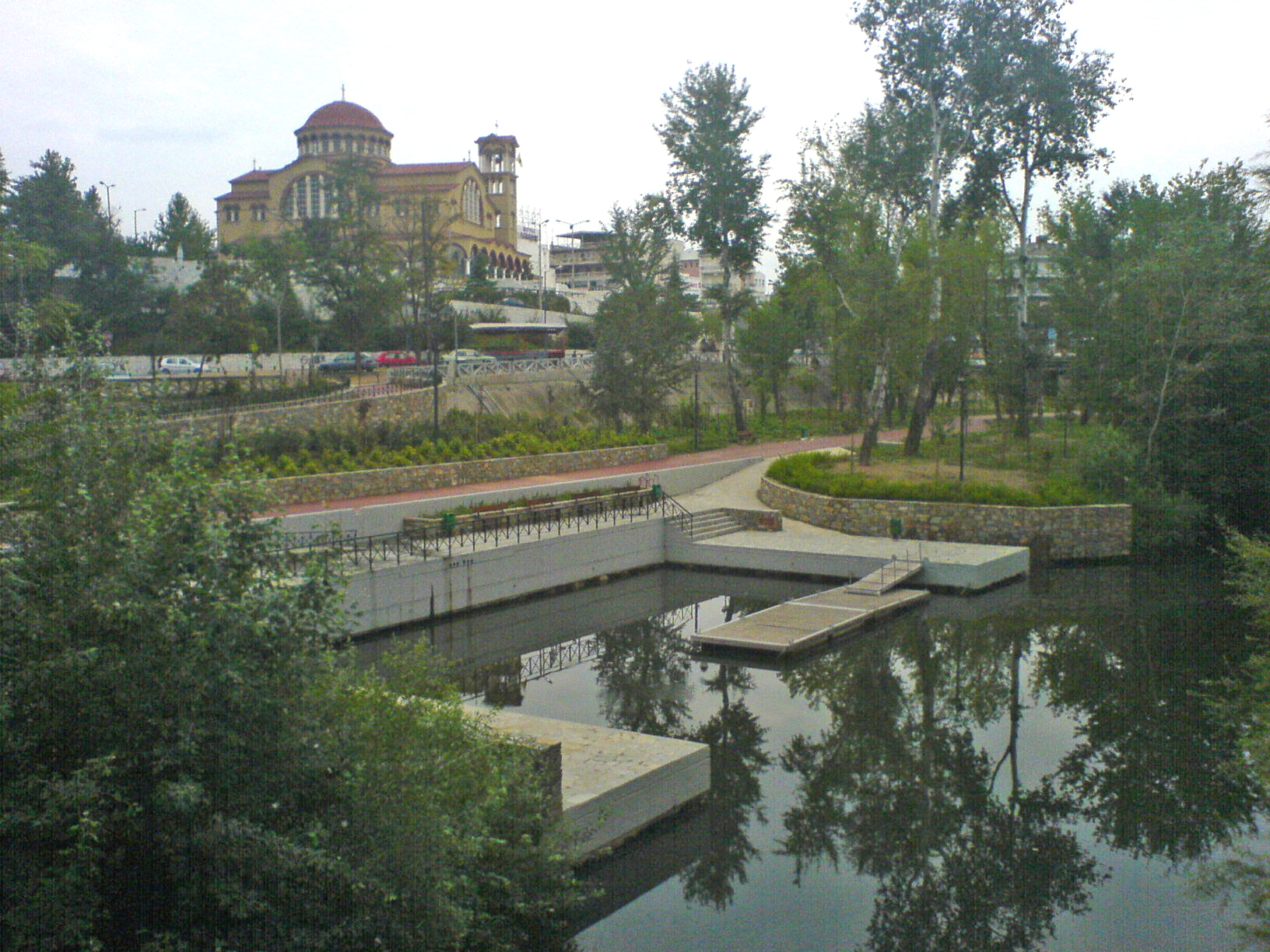
Pineios flowing through Larissa

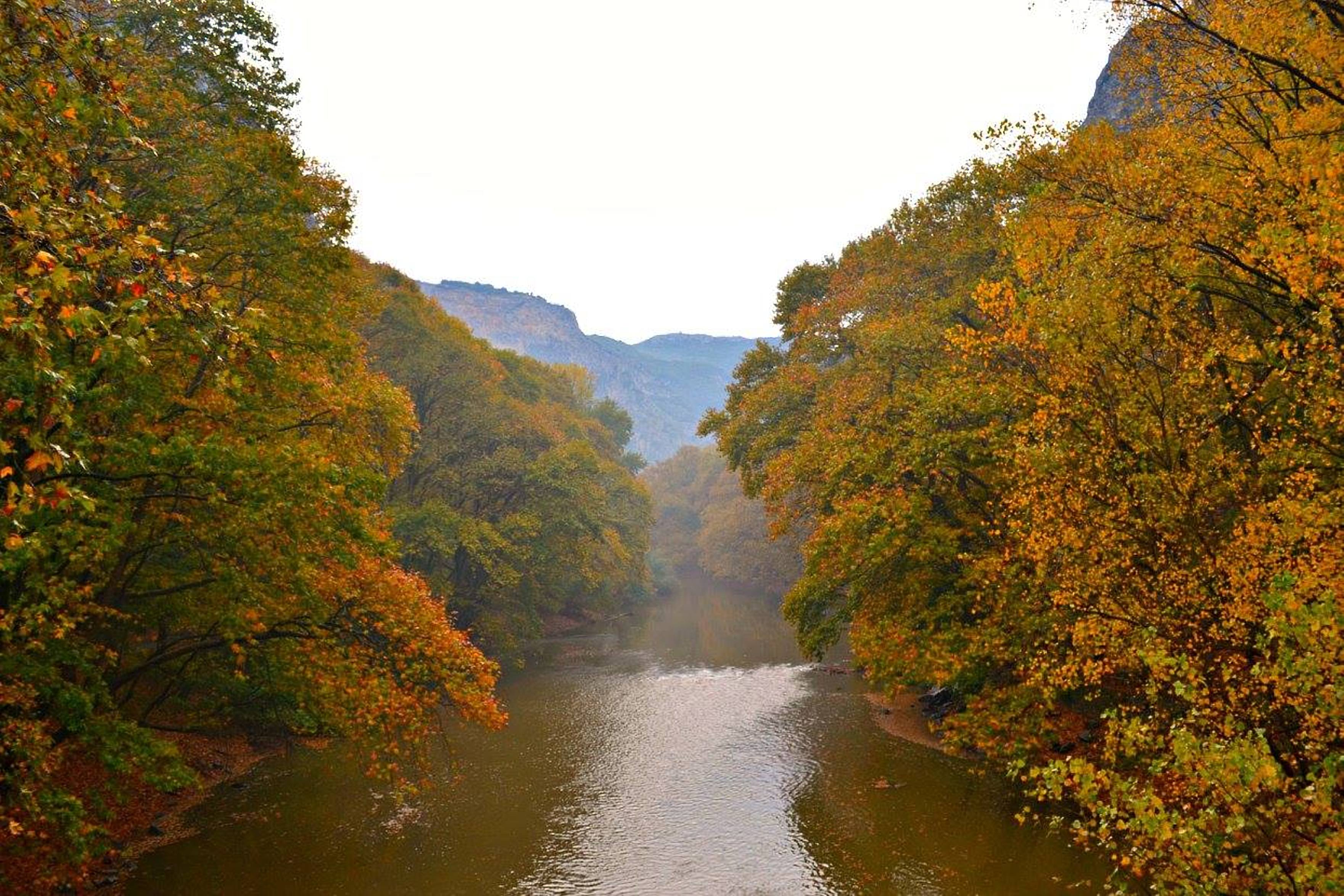
Pineios, autumn

It flows from the Pindus mountains through the Thessalian plain and empties into the Aegean Sea, northeast of the Vale of Tempe, near Stomio. It creates a large delta, well known for its beauty and for many animal species, protected by international environmental treaties. Its total length is 205 km. Its drainage basin is 9,500 km^{2} (3,700 sq mi). Its source is near the village Malakasi, on the eastern slope of the Pindus main range, east of Metsovo. The Meteora region and the city of Larissa lie along the Pineios. Trikala lies on its tributary, the Lithaios. In the 1960s, a freeway connecting Athens and Thessaloniki was constructed in much of the Vale of Tempe.

Three ships of the Hellenic Navy have been named after the river.

== Tributaries ==
Pineios major tributaries are: Malakassiótiko réma (stream), Mourgkánis (stream), Portaikós, Lithaíos, Pámissos, Enipeas and Titarisios.

== Places along the river ==
The Pineios flows along the following places, from the source downstream: Malakasi, Kalampaka, Megarchi, Megala Kalyvia, Farkadona, Larissa, Evangelismos, Omolio.
