= Emperor of the Serbs =

Royal title of the rulers of the Serbian Empire (1345–1373)

- Imperial
- Divellion (Emperor's personal banner)

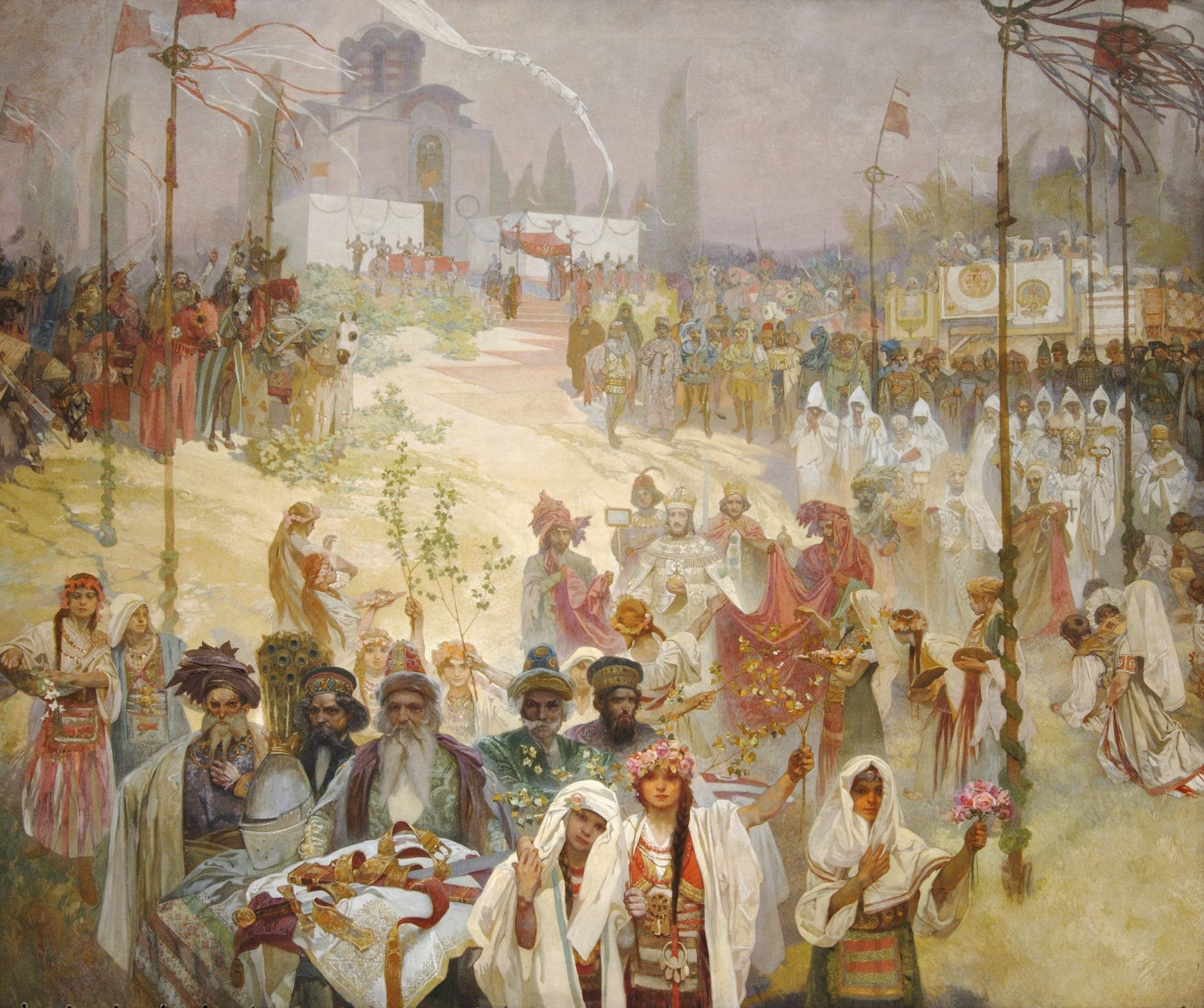
- Coronation of Emperor Dušan, in The Slavonic Epic (1926)

Details
- First monarch: Stefan Dušan
- Last monarch: John Uroš
- Formed: 16 April 1346
- Abolished: c. 1373
- Appointer: Hereditary

Between 1345 and 1373, four Serbian monarchs held the title of emperor (tsar). The full title was initially Emperor of the Serbs and Greeks, (Note: Serbian: цар Срба и Грка, romanized: car Srba i Grka) later Emperor of the Serbs, Greeks and Bulgarians (Note: Serbian: цар Срба и Грка и Бугара, romanized: car Srba i Grka i Bugara) in Serbian and basileus and autokrator of Serbia and Romania ["the land of the Romans"] (Note: Greek: βασιλεὺς καὶ αὐτοκράτωρ Σερβίας καὶ Ῥωμανίας, romanized: vasilèfs kaì aftokrátor Serbías kaì Romanías) in Greek. This title was soon enlarged into "Emperor and Autocrat of the Serbs and Greeks, the Bulgarians and Albanians". The Serbian Empire was ruled by two monarchs: Stefan Dušan (r. 1346–1355) and Stefan Uroš V (r. 1355–1371). Two other claimants of the title ruled in Thessaly, Central Greece.

== Establishment and titles ==
Taking advantage of the Byzantine civil war of 1341–1347 by alternately supporting both sides of the conflict, the Serbian king Stefan Dušan expanded his state southwards, conquering Albania and most of Macedonia by 1345, with the exception of the great fortress cities of Serres and Thessalonica. This growth in power made Serbia the de facto dominant state in the Balkans, and fuelled Dušan's imperial ambitions: already in early 1343, the Serbian ruler elevated his titles to "tsar and autokrator of all the Serbian and Maritime Lands and čestnik of the Greek [Byzantine] Lands".

Following his conquest of Serres, which crowned his conquest of Macedonia, in November or December 1345 Stefan Dušan proclaimed himself emperor (basileus), laying claim on the Byzantine imperial inheritance. On 16 April 1346 he was crowned emperor at Skopje in an assembly attended by the elevated Serbian Patriarch, and also the Bulgarian Patriarch and the Archbishop of Ohrid. His imperial title was recognised by Bulgaria and various other neighbors and trading partners, but not by the Byzantine Empire. According to imperial tradition, only one emperor could exist, the emperor of the Roman Empire. Others could only be Caesars (the second in rank). The hierarchs of Mount Athos addressed him as Emperor, though rather as Emperor of Serbs than Emperor of Serbs and Greeks. In Serbian charters, ethnic terms are used – "Emperor of the Serbs and Greeks" (Serbian: цар Срба и Грка / car Srba i Grka).

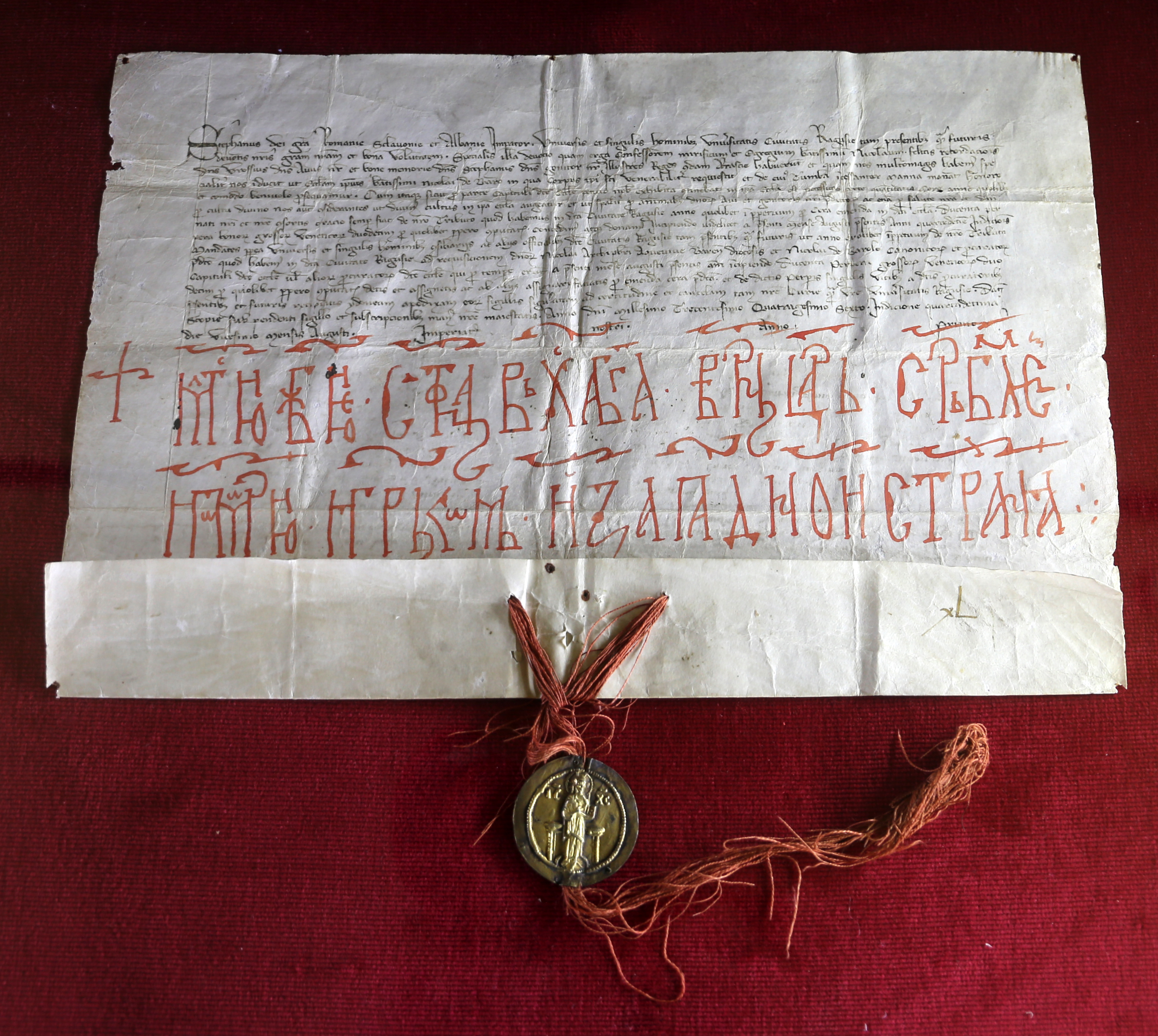
Specimen of Stefan Dušan's imperial charter.

In Greek, the title was "basileus and autokrator of Serbia and of Romania" (βασιλεὺς καὶ αὐτοκράτωρ Σερβίας καὶ Ῥωμανίας). The use of "Romania" (i.e. the 'land of the Romans', the Byzantine Empire) and not the usual Byzantine formula "of the Romans" was probably deliberately chosen; although in his Code Dušan claimed the direct succession to all Byzantine emperors from the time of Constantine the Great, he lacked possession of Constantinople and of the Ecumenical Patriarchate, which alone conferred full legitimacy to a Byzantine ruler. Notably, when the Byzantines came around to recognizing Dušan's imperial title, it was only for Serbia proper, much as they had done with the Bulgarian Tsar Simeon four centuries earlier. The contemporary Byzantine writers also clearly distinguished between the ancestral Serbian lands, where Dušan's son Stefan Uroš ruled as king, and the conquered lands "in Romania where Dušan (and Stefan Milutin before him) continued to use the pre-existing Byzantine administration. How clear this duality was in practice is open to question. Nevertheless, modern historians note that—in contrast to the lionization of Dušan by modern Serbian historiography—Dušan's proclamation of empire was not well received in Serbia proper, as indicated by the fact that he was never sanctified by the Serbian Church, or why his official biography, alone among the medieval Serbian rulers, was never completed.

On his early Western-style coinage, issued between his proclamation as emperor and his coronation, Dušan continued to use the abbreviated Latin title Rex Rasciae ("King of Rascia"), and simply added the title I[m]p[erator] Roma[niae] ("Emperor of the Roman lands"), but also I[m]p[erator] Ro[ma]io[ru]m ("Emperor of the Romans"). After his coronation, the title of king was dropped.

== List of monarchs ==
When Stefan Dušan died in 1355, his son Stefan Uroš V succeeded him. Uroš V's uncle Simeon Uroš in Thessaly claimed the title in rivalry, continued by his son John Uroš. With the extinction of the main line of the Nemanjić dynasty with the death of heirless Stefan Uroš V in 1371, the imperial title became obsolete. The fall of the Serbian Empire saw the state fragmenting into provinces ruled by magnates, holding various titles, except the imperial. In 1527, a renegade Serbian commander in Hungary, Jovan Nenad, styled himself Emperor.

Monarch	Reign	Comments
Stefan Dušan	16 April 1346 – 20 December 1355	
Stefan Uroš V	20 December 1355–2/4 December 1371	
Simeon Uroš	1359–1370	Rival Emperor in Epirus, and later Thessaly.
John Uroš	1370–1373	Rival Emperor in Thessaly.

== Titles ==
Stefan Dušan

- "Emperor of Serbs and Greeks"
  - (царь Срьблѥмь и Гркωмь), in 1349.
  - (царь Срьблемь и Грькωмь), in 1349 (Skopje), and in September 1349.
  - (царь Сербомь и Геркомь), in 1351.
  - (царь Срьблѥмь и Грькωмь), on 20 December 1356, obituary.
- "Emperor of Serbs and Greeks and the Western Provinces" (царь Срблемь и Гркωмь и Западнимь Странамь), in 1349.
- "Emperor of Serbs, Greeks and Bulgarians". („Царь Србљем, Грком и Блгаром".)
- "Emperor of Serbs, Greeks, Bulgarians and Albanians". („Царь Србљем, Грком, Блгаром и Арбанасом".)
- "Emperor of the Serbs", by the Athonite community.
- "Emperor and Autocrat of Serbia and Romania" (Greek: βασιλεὺς καὶ αὐτοκράτωρ Σερβίας καὶ Ῥωμανίας), from a chrysobull to Iveron Monastery.
- "Emperor of all Serb and Greek lands, the Maritime Region, Arbania and the Western Provinces (цар свију српских и грчких земаља, Поморја, Арбаније и Западних Страна).
- "Emperor of Greece and King of All Serb Lands and the Maritime" (царь грьчкїи и краль все срьбскїе земли и поморскїе), between 1347 and 1356.
- "Emperor of Serbia and the Maritime Region" (царь србкχ и пморски), between 1347 and 1356.
- "Emperor of Rascia and Romania, Despot of Arta and Count of Vlachia" (Latin: imperator Raxie et Romanie, dispotus Lartae et Blachie comes) in 1348, after the Serb conquest of Epirus ("Arta") and Thessaly ("Vlachia").
- "Emperor of All Serbs and Greeks, the Bulgarians, the Maritime Lands, the Western Frontier, Phrygia and the Albanians (car Vsem Srbljem i Grkom, i Stranama blgarskim i vsemu Disou, Pomorju, Frugiže i Arvanitom) in Dušan's Code.

Stefan Uroš V

- "Emperor of Serbs and Greeks"
  - (царь Срьблемь и Гркωмь), in 1357.
  - (царь Срьблемь и Гркοмь), in 1358.
  - (царь Срьблемь и Грькωмь), in 1357, 1360.
  - (царь Срблемь и Гркωмь), twice in 1357, 1362, 1365, and between 1356 and 1367.

=== Simeon Uroš ===
- "Emperor and Autocrat of the Romans and Serbia"
  - (βασιλεὺς καὶ αὐτοκράτωρ τῶν Ῥωμαίων καὶ Σερβείας), in 1359.
- "Emperor and Autocrat of the Romans and Serbians"
  - (βασιλεὺς καὶ αὐτοκράτωρ τῶν Ῥωμαίων καὶ Σερβών), in 1361.
- "Emperor and Autocrat of the Romans and Serbia and Romania"
  - (βασιλεὺς καὶ αὐτοκράτωρ τῶν Ῥωμαίων καὶ Σερβείας καὶ Ῥωμανίας), in 1366.
- "Emperor and Autocrat of the Romans and Serbia and All Albania"
  - (βασιλεὺς καὶ αὐτοκράτωρ τῶν Ῥωμαίων καὶ Σερβών καὶ παντός Ἀλβανου), in 1366.

== See also ==
- Dušan's Code
- List of Serbian monarchs

== Sources ==
- Fine, John V. A. (1994) [1987]. The Late Medieval Balkans: A Critical Survey from the Late Twelfth Century to the Ottoman Conquest. Ann Arbor, Michigan: University of Michigan Press. ISBN 978-0-472-10079-8.
- Lascaris, M.(1955-56-57) "DEUX CHARTES DE JEAN UROŠ, DERNIER NÉMANIDE (NOVEMBRE 1372, INDICTION XI)". Byzantion 25/27 (1), pp. 277–323.
- Maksimovic, Ljubomir (2011). "Chapitre XVII. – La Serbie : pouvoir et administration sociale". In Laiou, Angeliki (ed.). Le monde byzantin, Tome III: L'empire grec et ses voisins (XIIIe-XVe siècle) (in French). Presses Universitaires de France. pp. 323–342. ISBN 978-2-13-052008-5.
- Miklosich, Franz (1858). Monumenta Serbica spectantia historiam Serbiae, Bosnae, Ragusii. Vienna: apud Guilelmum Braumüller.
- Solovjev, A. and Mosin, V. (1974) Diplomata graeca regum et imperatorum Serviae. London: Variorum Reprints.
- Soulis, George C. (1963). "Thessalian Vlachia". Zbornik Radova Vizantološkog Instituta. 8 (1): 271–273.
- Soulis, George C. (1984). The Serbs and Byzantium during the reign of Emperor Stephen Dušan (1331–1355) and his successors. Dumbarton Oaks. ISBN 0-88402-137-8.
- Hupchick, Dennis P. (1995). Conflict and chaos in Eastern Europe. Palgrave Macmillan. ISBN 978-0-312-12116-7.
- Darby, Henry Clifford; Clissold, Stephen (1968). Stephen Clissold (ed.). Short History of Yugoslavia from early time to 1966. CUP Archive. ISBN 0-521-09531-X.
- White, George W. (2000). Nationalism and Territory: Constructing Group Identity in Southeastern Europe. Rowman & Littlefield. ISBN 978-0-8476-9809-7.
