= Adrachti =

Rock in Meteora, Greece

- Αδράχτι
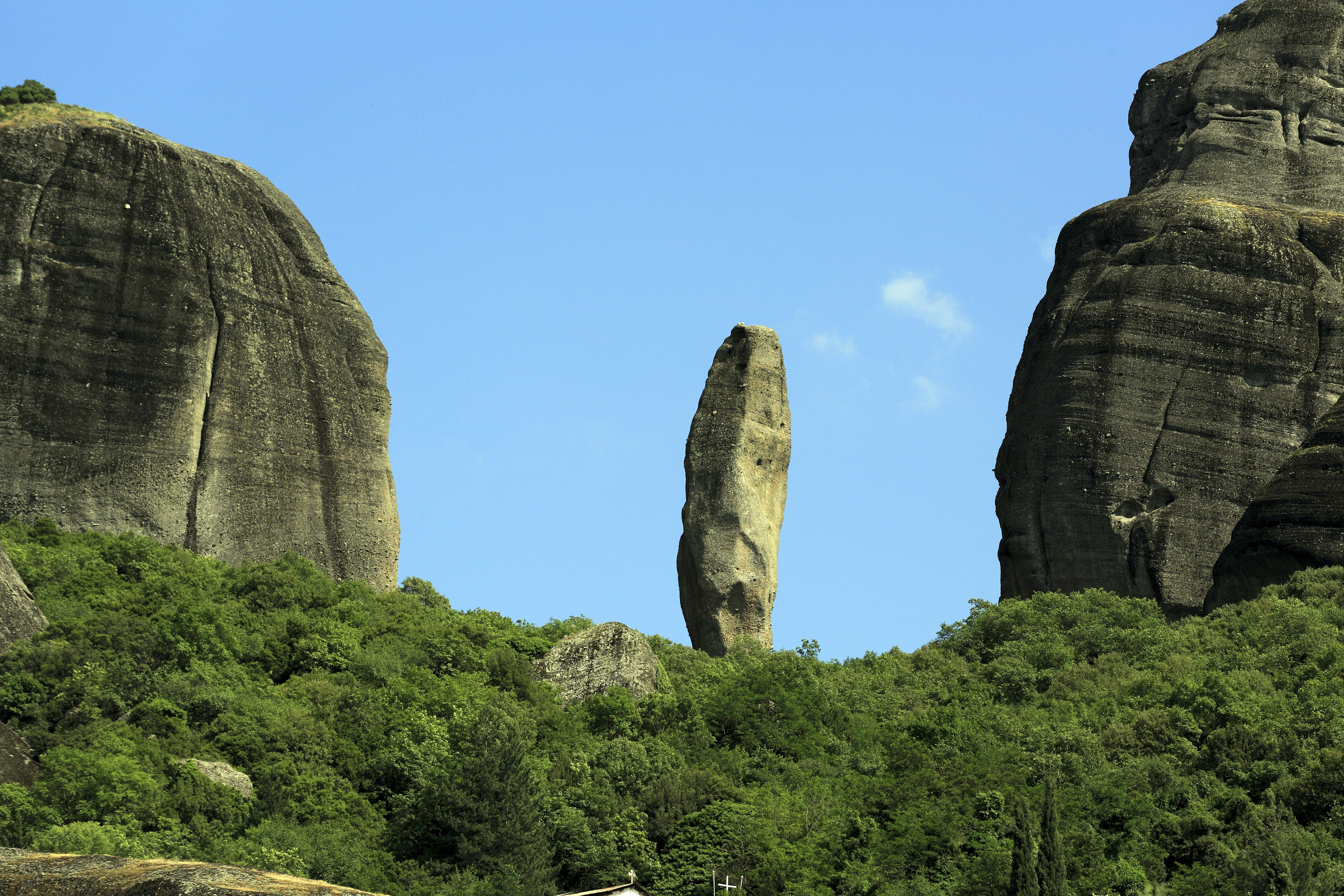
- Adrachti (rock in the center)

Highest point
- Elevation: 474 m (1,555 ft)
- Coordinates: 39.7133974°N 21.6262404°E

Geography
- Location within Greece
- Location: Meteora
- Country: Greece
- Administrative region: Thessaly
- Regional unit: Trikala
- Settlement: Kalabaka

Adrachti (Greek: Αδράχτι) is a rock in the Meteora rock formation complex of Thessaly, Greece.

Due to its long, thin shape, it is sometimes called the "Spindle". In clockwise order, starting from the north, it is surrounded by Sourloti, Modi, Alysos, Agia, and Pyxari rocks.

The tip of Adrachti stands at a height of 474 m (1,555 ft) above sea level.

== Access ==
A trail leads to Adrachti from the village of Kastraki. The trail starts off as a stairway with wooden steps and leads up to the Cell of Constantius (Κελί του Κωνστάντιου), and then continues further uphills directly to the base of Adrachti.
