= Monastery of St. Dimitrios =

Former monastery in Kalabaka Municipality, Thessaly Region, Greece

- Μονή Αγίου Δημητρίου
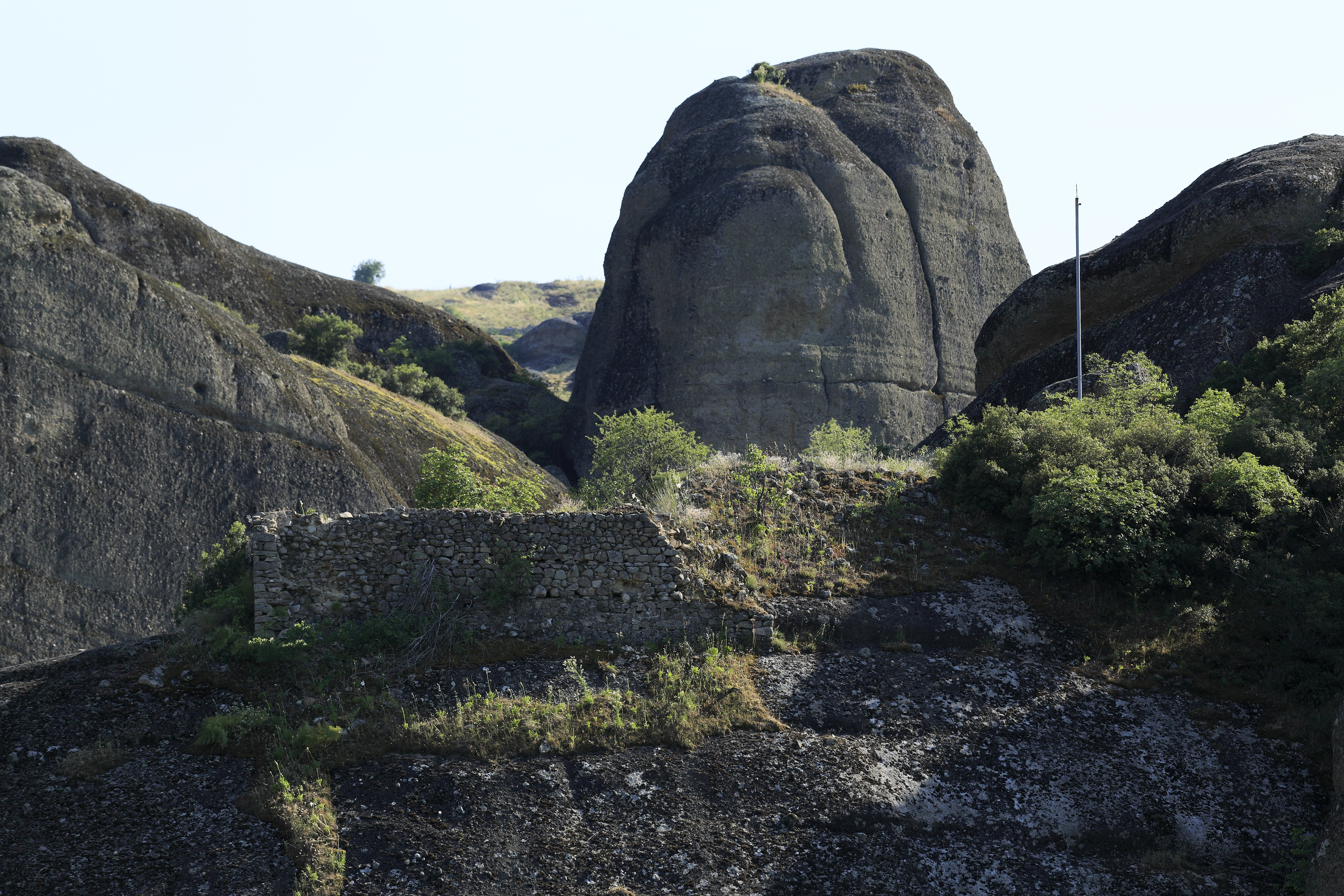
- The ruins of the monastery in the foreground

- Location of the former monastery in Greece
- Monastery of St. Dimitrios
- 39°44′00″N 21°37′52″E
- Location: Kalabaka, Thessaly
- Country: Greece
- Denomination: Greek Orthodox (former)

History
- Status: Monastery (14th century–1809)

Architecture
- Functional status: Inactive (ruinous state)
- Architectural type: Monastery
- Style: Byzantine (Athonite)
- Completed: c. 14th century
- Demolished: 1809

The Monastery of St. Dimitrios (Greek: Μονή Αγίου Δημητρίου, romanized: Moni Agiou Dimitriou) is a former Greek Orthodox monastery that is part of the Meteora monastery complex in Kalabaka, in the Thessaly region of central Greece.

In 1809, the Albanian Ottoman pasha Ali Pasha Tepelena destroyed the monastery, since Greek insurgents led by the local klepht leader Thymios Vlachavas were hiding at the site. Today, the monastery ruins can be seen on Dimitrios Rock. Ypapantis Monastery is located on the same rock, below the Monastery of St. Dimitrios.

== Access ==
A trail leads up to the base of the rock from the main unpaved road below. The monastery ruins can only be reached by climbing the rock.

== See also ==
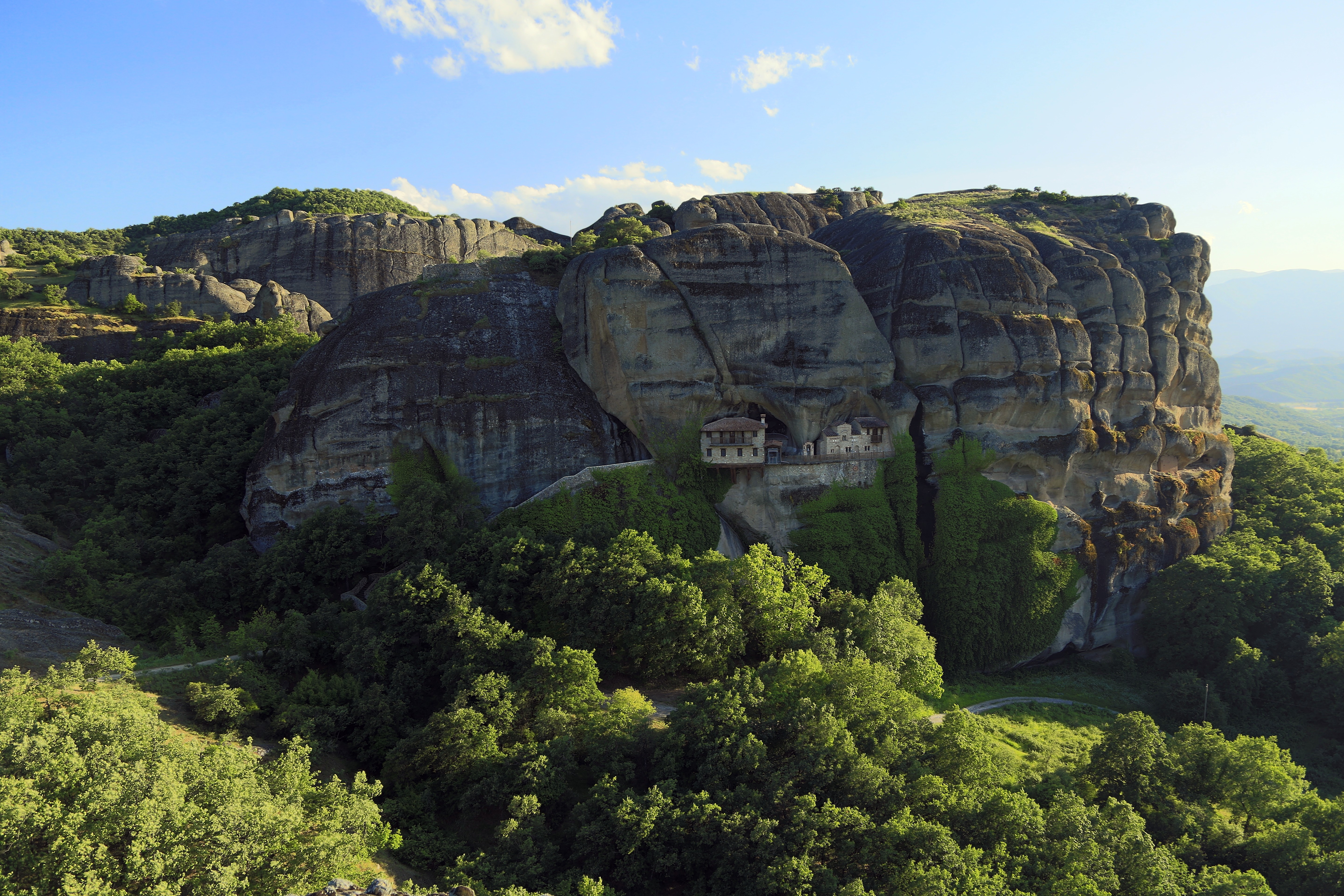
The ruins of the Monastery of St. Dimitrios are in the center left, on the top of the Dimitrios Rock. Ypapantis Monastery is the building in the lower part of the rock.

- Church of Greece
- List of Greek Orthodox monasteries in Greece
