= Dupiani =

Rock in the Meteora rock formation, Thessaly, Greece

- Δούπιανη
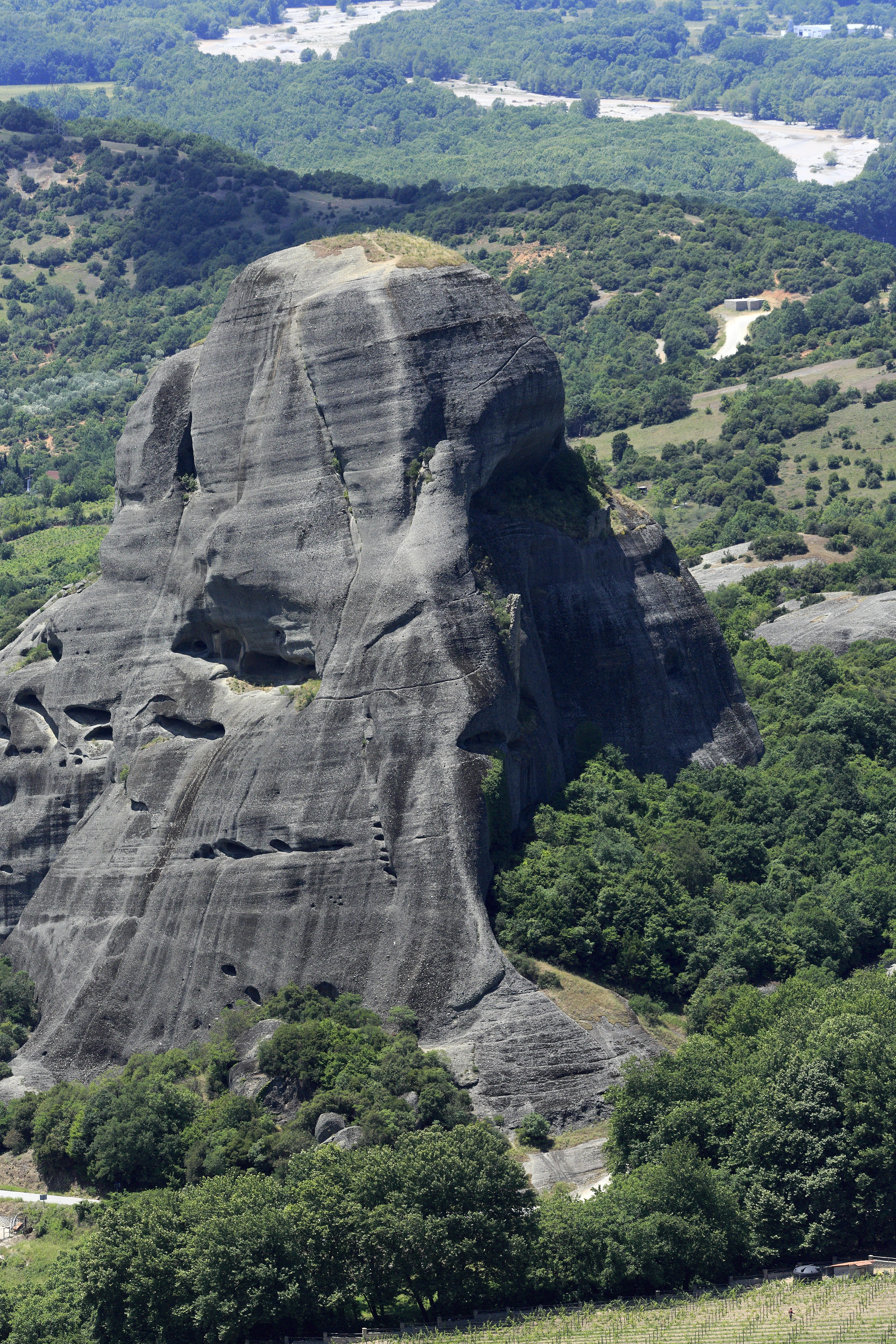

Highest point
- Elevation: 390 m (1,280 ft)
- Coordinates: 39.7221997°N 21.6205625°E

Geography
- Location: Meteora
- Country: Greece
- Administrative region: Thessaly
- Regional unit: Trikala
- Settlement: Kalabaka

Dupiani or Doupiani (Greek: Δούπιανη; sometimes spelled Ντούπιανη) is a rock in the Meteora rock formation complex of Thessaly, Greece. It is located within the village of Kastraki and is located directly adjacent to several hotels and restaurants that cater to international tourists.

== Monasteries ==
Dupiani is the rock with the first monastery founded in Meteora, the Skete of the Holy Virgin of Dupiani, also called the Panagia Parthenos Kyriakou Monastery (39.721072°N 21.619516°E). It was founded in 1347 by Hieromonk Nil, according to a 16th-century chronicle. The ascetics of the skete inhabited the surrounding caves, descending into the valley every Sunday for the Divine Liturgy in the katholikon (main church). This church has survived to the present day in relatively good condition, as have some of the frescoes inside it. Renovations took place in 1867 and 1974. However, the original monastery itself has not survived.

Nearby, the Monastery of St. Dimitrios of Dupiani (39.722322°N 21.621405°E) at Dupiani is not to be confused with the Monastery of St. Dimitrios adjacent to Ypapantis Monastery, located further to the north.

The ruins of the Monastery of the Pantocrator (39.722293°N 21.621406°E) are also located in the Dupiani area. Located on the northern side of Dupiani, ruins of the monastery tower and walls can still be seen today. The monastery's leaders included Neophytos and Serapion, who was the abbot of the monastery in 1426.
