= Kastraki, Trikala =

Community in Thessaly, Greece

Kastraki Καστράκι
- Community
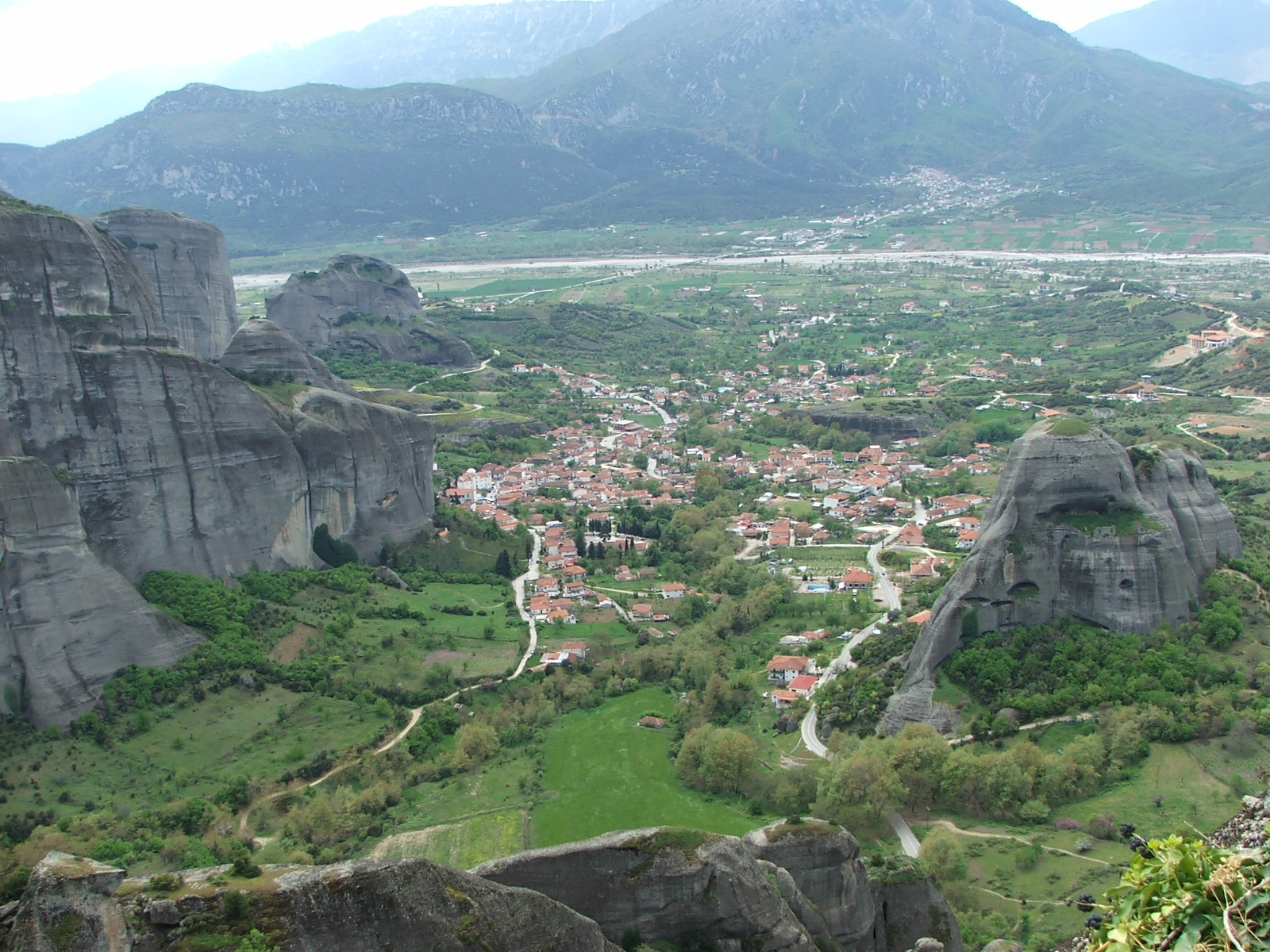
- View of Kastraki from the Meteora rocks. In the distance is the Pineios River. Upstream is to the right. To the left is Kalabaka. The edge of Holy Spirit Rock is on the right. Surloti Rock is the second-to-last one on the left.

- Location within Greece
- Coordinates: 39°43′01″N 21°37′13″E
- Country: Greece
- Administrative region: Thessaly
- Regional unit: Trikala
- Municipality: Meteora
- Municipal unit: Kalabaka
- Elevation: 275 m (902 ft)

Population (2021)
  - Community: 1,023
- Time zone: UTC+2 (EET)
  - Summer (DST): UTC+3 (EEST)

Kastraki (Greek: Καστράκι) is a village in Kalabaka municipal unit, Trikala, Thessaly, Greece. It is located on the northwest of the main municipal unit of Kalabaka. Kastraki takes advantage of a small valley opening into the southwest side of the Meteora massif. It is thus surrounded by precipices except on the west side, at the entrance to the valley. That entrance is flanked by two rock columns, one on each side, Agion Pneuma and Surloti. It has some elevation over the river, but not excessive. At the head of the valley stands a tall, thin rock, called Spindle Rock. Beyond it the massif does not allow for urban settlement. The monasteries are sprinkled on various tall precipices.

The village had a population of 1,023 as of 2021. The administrative village occupies an area of 47.9 km^{2}. Its elevation is 275 metres above sea level.

== Etymology ==
The name Kastraki is derived from the word kastro, or Byzantine castle. The castle was built by Andronikos Palaiologos and stood until 1362. The castle is in ruins today.

== History ==
During the early 1700s, Kastraki was formed from an amalgamation of hamlets called Rouxiori, Agia Paraskevi, Rigilavo, and Triskiano. These hamlets were founded by migrants from northern Epirus (i.e., southern Albania) who were fleeing from the Ottomans.

== Description ==
The village has a central plaza and church, as well as various hotels and restaurants (tavernas) that cater to international tourists. An extensive network of trails connects Kastraki to various rocks and monasteries. The town of Kalambaka is a 20-minute walk away via the main road.

== Rocks ==
Various rocks of the Meteora rock complex surround the village of Kastraki.

=== Rocks in the north ===
- Dupiani (Δούπιανη)

=== Rocks in the east ===
- Agio Pneuma (Άγιο Πνεύμα), site of the historic Hermitage of St. George of Mandila and Monks' Prison
- Kumaries (Κουμαριές)
- Toichos Alpha (Τοίχος Α)
- Toichos Beta (Τοίχος Β)
- Toichos Gamma (Τοίχος Γ)
- Toichos Delta (Τοίχος Δ)
- Surloti (Σουρλωτή)
- Modi (Μόδι), site of the historic Monastery of St. Modestus
- Alysos (Άλυσος) / Altsos (Άλτσος) / Alsos (Άλσος), site of the historic Monastery of the Apostle Peter's Chains

=== Rocks in the south ===
- Pyxari (Πυξάρι), site of the historic Hermitage of Saint Gregory the Theologian (Ασκηταριά Αγίου Γρηγορίου του Θεολόγου), Hermitage of St. Anthony, and Hermitage of Chrysostomos. The Monastery of St. Apostoles (Μονή Αγίων Αποστόλων) is also nearby.
- Badovas (Μπάντοβας), site of the historic Hermitage of St. Nicholas of Badovas
- Ambaria (Αμπάρια)

== Sport ==
In 2016, the first Meteora MTB Race took place in the village.
