= Ypapantis Monastery =

Former monastery in Kalabaka Municipality, Thessaly Region, Greece

- Μονή Υπαπαντής
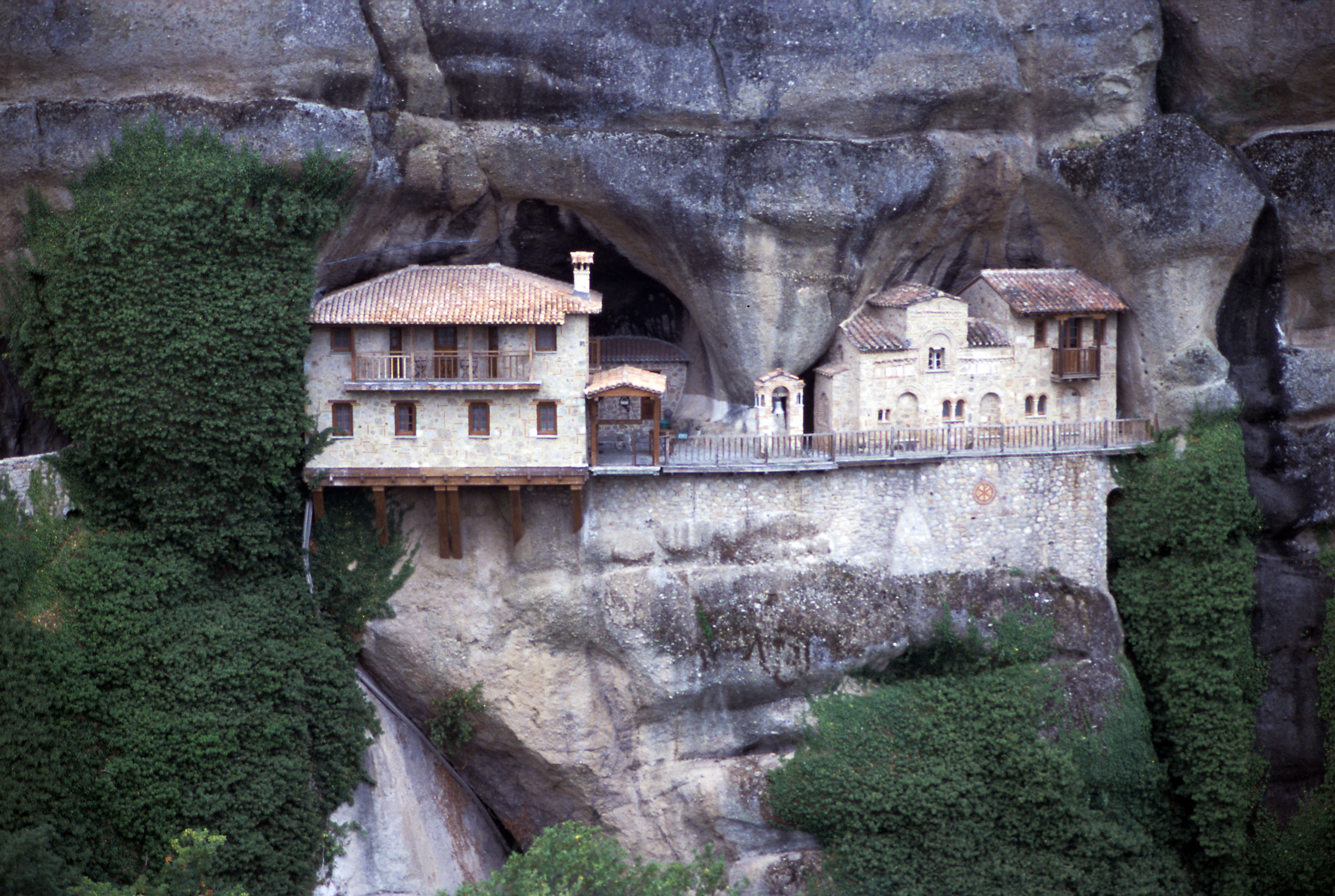
- The ruins of the monastery in the foreground

- Location of the former monastery in Greece
- Ypapantis Monastery
- 39°44′00″N 21°37′51″E
- Location: Kalabaka, Thessaly
- Country: Greece
- Denomination: Greek Orthodox (former)

History
- Status: Monastery (former)
- Founder: Skete of Dupiani

Architecture
- Functional status: Inactive (in partial ruins)
- Architectural type: Monastery
- Style: Byzantine (Athonite)
- Completed: 1367

The Ypapantis Monastery (Greek: Μονή Υπαπαντής, lit. 'Monastery of the Presentation of Jesus'), also known as the Monastery of the Ascension of the Savior (Greek: Αναλήψεως του Σωτήρος, romanized: Analipseos tou Sotiros), is a former Greek Orthodox monastery that is part of the Meteora monastery complex in Kalabaka, in the Thessaly region of central Greece. The monastery is built into the side of Dimitrios Rock.

== Description ==
It was founded in 1367 by the abbot of the Skete of Dupiani. In 1765, it was restored by Athanasios Vlachavas, a local leader in the area who was a family member of Thymios Vlachavas. Today, Ypapantis Monastery (literally "Monastery of the Purification [of the Virgin Mary]") is inactive and rarely visited, although the building (39.733470°N 21.630868°E) has been restored.

== Access ==
A stairway leads up to the monastery building from the main road, which is unpaved. A network of trails connects it with Dupiani Rock and the village of Kastraki.

== See also ==
- Church of Greece
- List of Greek Orthodox monasteries in Greece
