= Holy Spirit Rock =

Rock in Meteora, Greece

Holy Spirit
- Αγιο πνεύμα
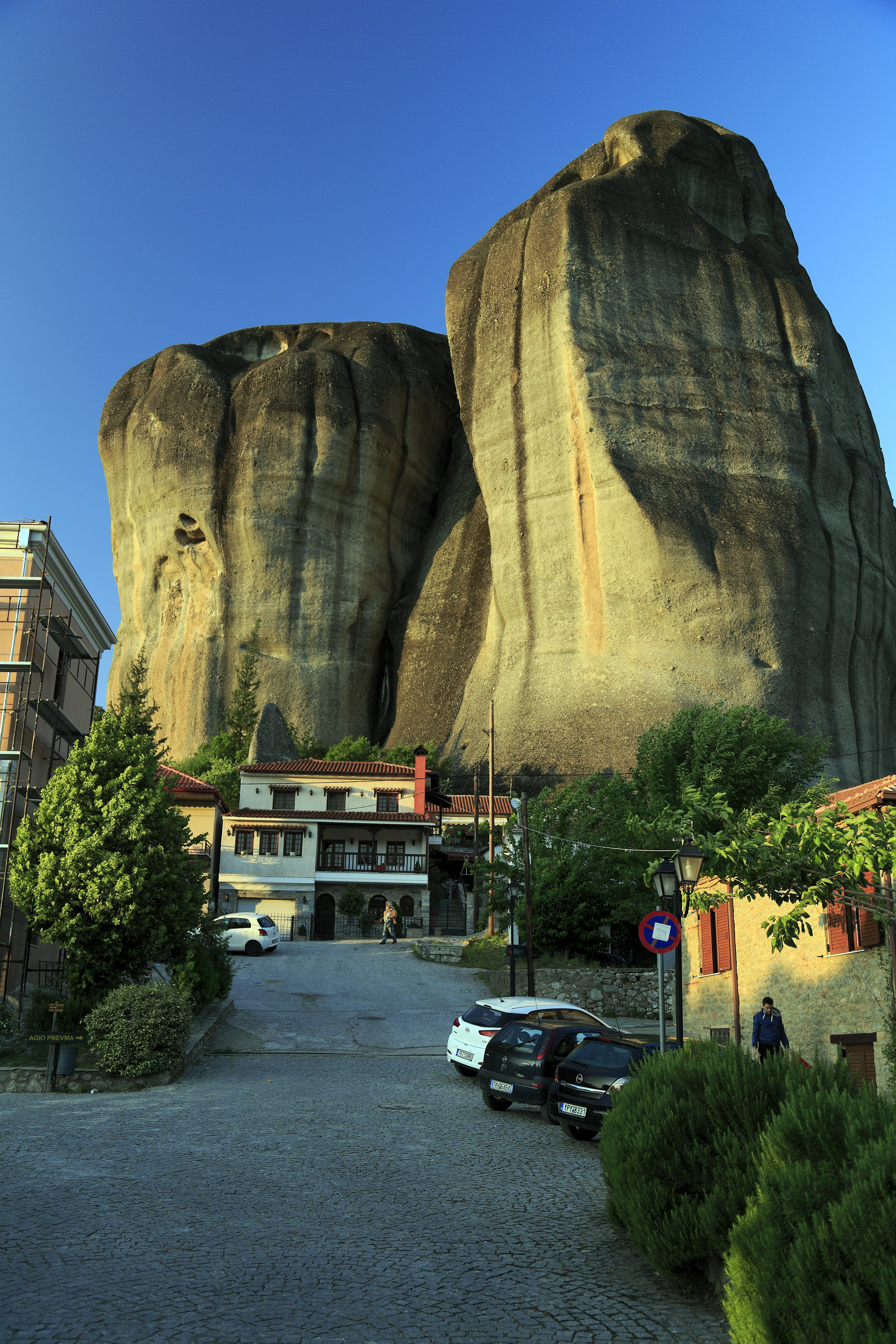
- View of the Holy Spirit Rock from Kastraki

Highest point
- Elevation: 600 m (2,000 ft)
- Coordinates: 39°43′08″N 21°37′29″E

Geography
- Location: Meteora
- Country: Greece
- Administrative region: Thessaly
- Regional unit: Trikala
- Settlement: Kalabaka

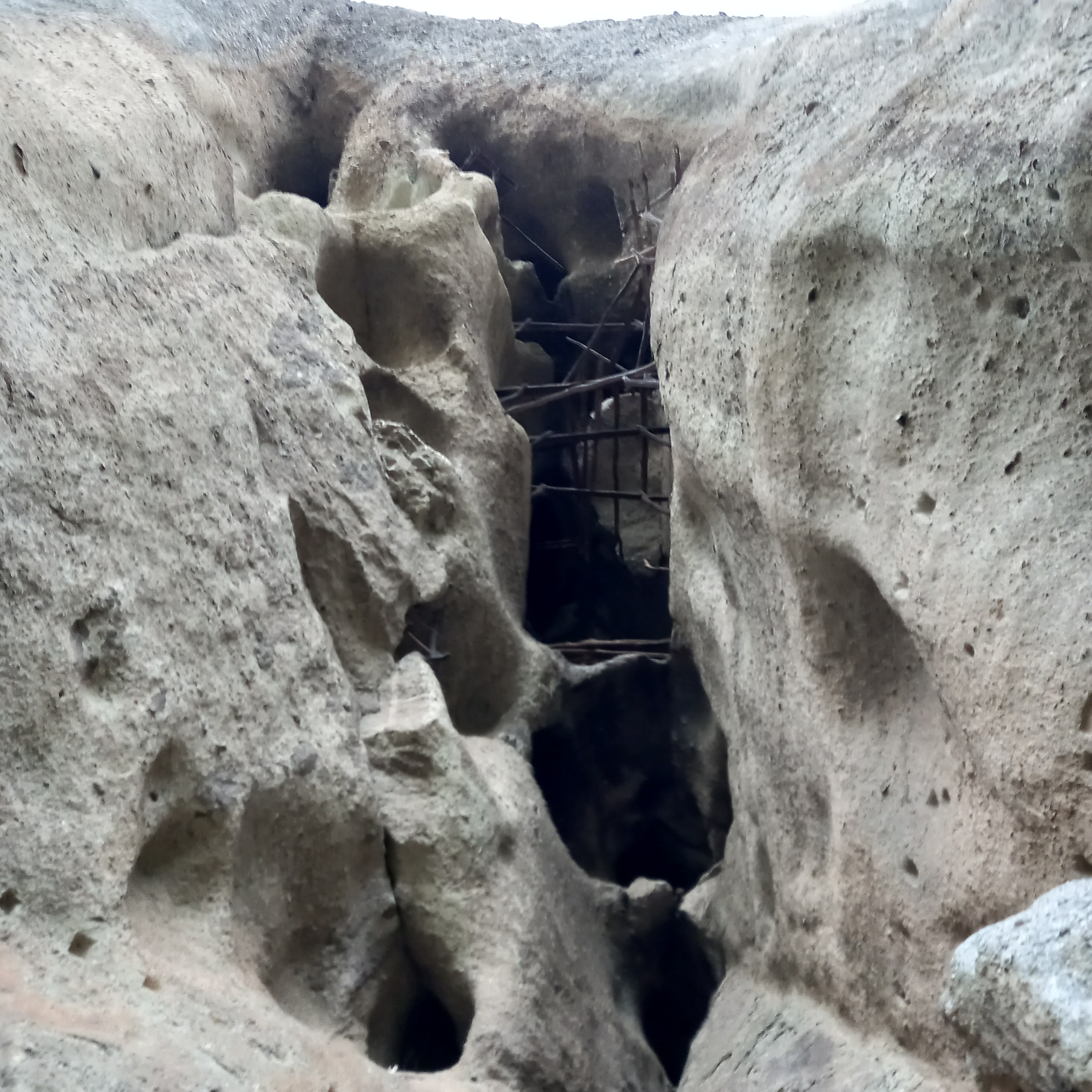
Monks' Prison in Holy Spirit Rock

The Holy Spirit Rock or Holy Ghost Rock, also known as the Agion Pneuma in Greek, is a rock in the Meteora rock formation complex of Thessaly, Greece. It stands on the northern flank of the westward-opening valley in which Kastraki, Trikala is located. The southern flank is guarded, so to speak, by Surloti Rock. South of it a NE trending line of additional precipices separates Kastraki from the more urban Kalabaka, a municipal unit, and seat of, Meteora (municipality). Kastraki is a community of Kalabaka.

The Holy Spirit Rock is long and thin, trending also to the NE. It is multi-partite with a characteristic peak like a tab in the center. Seen from the end, the rock appears as a tall triangle. Kastraki is located mainly off its west end, but some of the streets of Kastraki climb the base of the rock. The NE trending ridge is not to be confused with the one further south that separates Kastraki from Kalabaka. West of the valley the Pineios River flows from north to south. To the east, the valley rises gradually into the Meteora massif, where a number of monasteries are ensconced on precipices, which they were long before the Ottomans or their Albanian peacekeepers were in Greece.

== Monasteries and sites ==
The Monks' Prison (Filakaé Monakón) (39°43′13″N 21°37′38″E) is built in long vertical crevice on the eastern side of the Holy Spirit Rock. From Kastraki, it can be reached via an unmarked hiking trail.

The ruins of the Agiou Pneuma Monastery ("Monastery of the Holy Spirit") are located on the rock (39°43′06″N 21°37′30″E). The Monastery of the Holy Spirit is built on a 300-metre high cliff. A path carved into the cliff leads to the church, which has survived to this day. The frescoes have completely decayed. The altar, sacristy, and prayer book are carved into the rock, and at the entrance to the right is a carved coffin where the clergyman's grave is located. To the left of the shrine are two cisterns for collecting rainwater. There are abandoned cells and trees in several places. At the top of the cliff is an iron cross, said to have been erected by the Serbian king Stefan Dušan.

The Monastery of St. George of Mandila (39°43′06″N 21°37′21″E) is also located on the rock. Kerchiefs (mandilia) are traditionally hung at the cave entrance. It may have been one of the four monasteries founded around 1367 by Neilos, the Prior of the Skete of Stagoi. The Cave of St. George of Mandila may be the same as the Cave of Archimandrite Makarios near Pigadion. The base can be easily reached from Kastraki, but rock climbing is needed to reach the actual cave.

Stylos Stagon (Στύλος Σταγών), a rock pillar, is part of the Holy Spirit rock complex.

The Monastery of Theostiriktos (Μονή Θεοστηρίκτου) is located in the Holy Spirit Rock area, but its exact location is uncertain.

== Access ==
A network of trails surrounding the rock can be reached from the village of Kastraki.
