= Pantokratoros Monastery (Meteora) =

Former monastery in Kalabaka Municipality, Thessaly Region, Greece

Monastery of the Pantocrator
- Μονή Παντοκράτορος
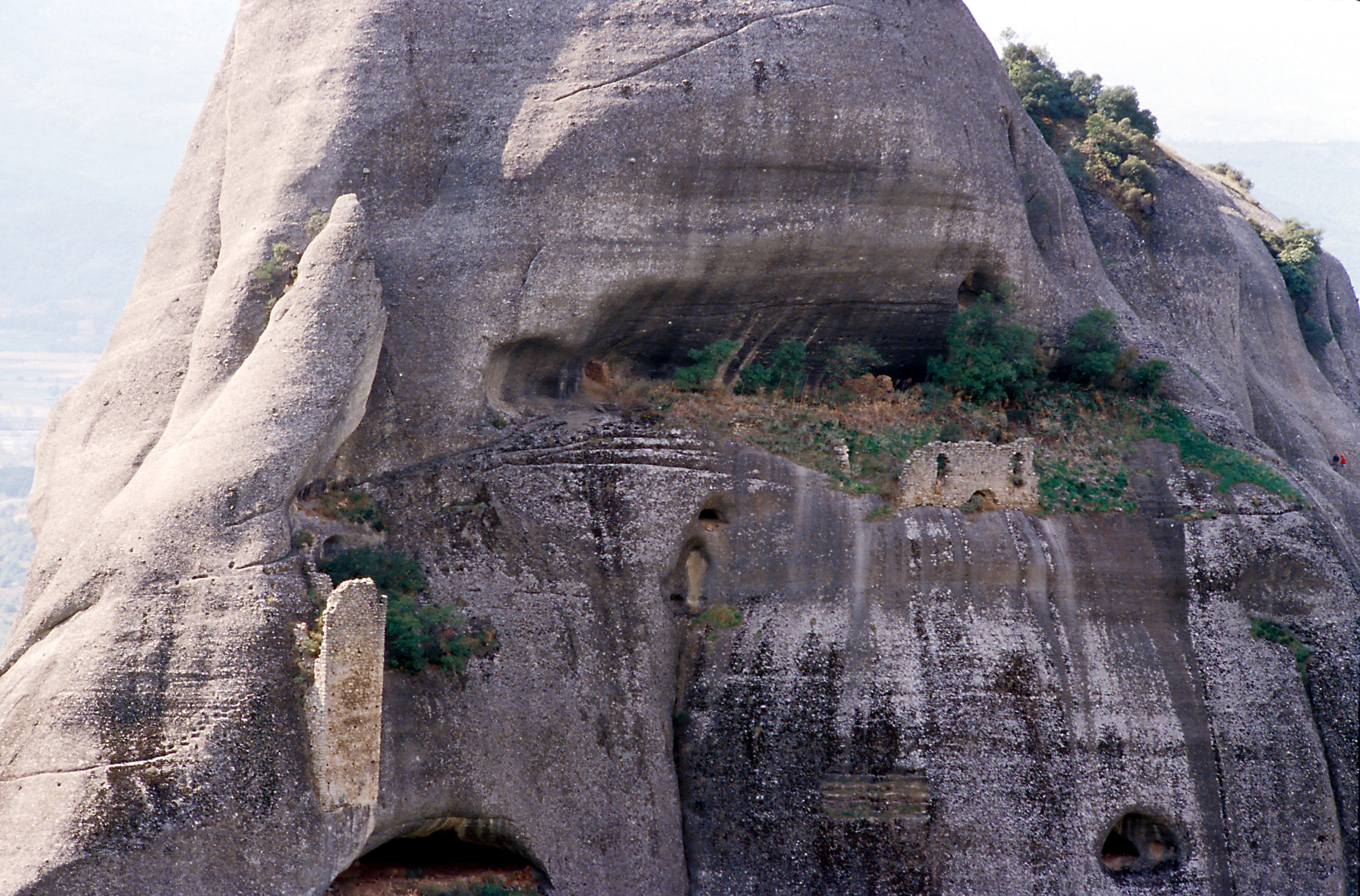
- The ruins of the monastery in the foreground

- Location of the former monastery in Greece
- Monastery of the Pantocrator
- 39°43′20″N 21°37′17″E
- Location: Kalabaka, Thessaly
- Country: Greece
- Denomination: Greek Orthodox (former))

History
- Status: Monastery (former
- Dedication: Pantocrator

Architecture
- Functional status: Inactive (in partial ruins)
- Architectural type: Monastery
- Style: Byzantine (Athonite)
- Completed: c. 14th – c. 15th century

The Pantokratoros Monastery or the Monastery of the Pantocrator (Greek: Μονή Παντοκράτορος, romanized: Moni Pantokratoros), also called the Monastery of the Ascension of the Lord (Greek: Αναλήψεως του Κυρίου, romanized: Analipseos tou Kyriou), is a former Greek Orthodox monastery that is part of the Meteora monastery complex in Kalabaka, in the Thessaly region of central Greece. It is located on the eastern side of Dupiani Rock. Only ruins remain today. The wall and foundation ruins are located in a crevice in the rock. The ruins of a tower can also be seen today.

== Access ==
The monastery ruins can only be reached by rock climbing. Views of the monastery ruins can be seen from various sites throughout Meteora, including the Monastery of St. Nicholas Anapausas.

== See also ==
- Church of Greece
- List of Greek Orthodox monasteries in Greece
