= Vlachava =

Vlachava Βλαχάβα
- Community
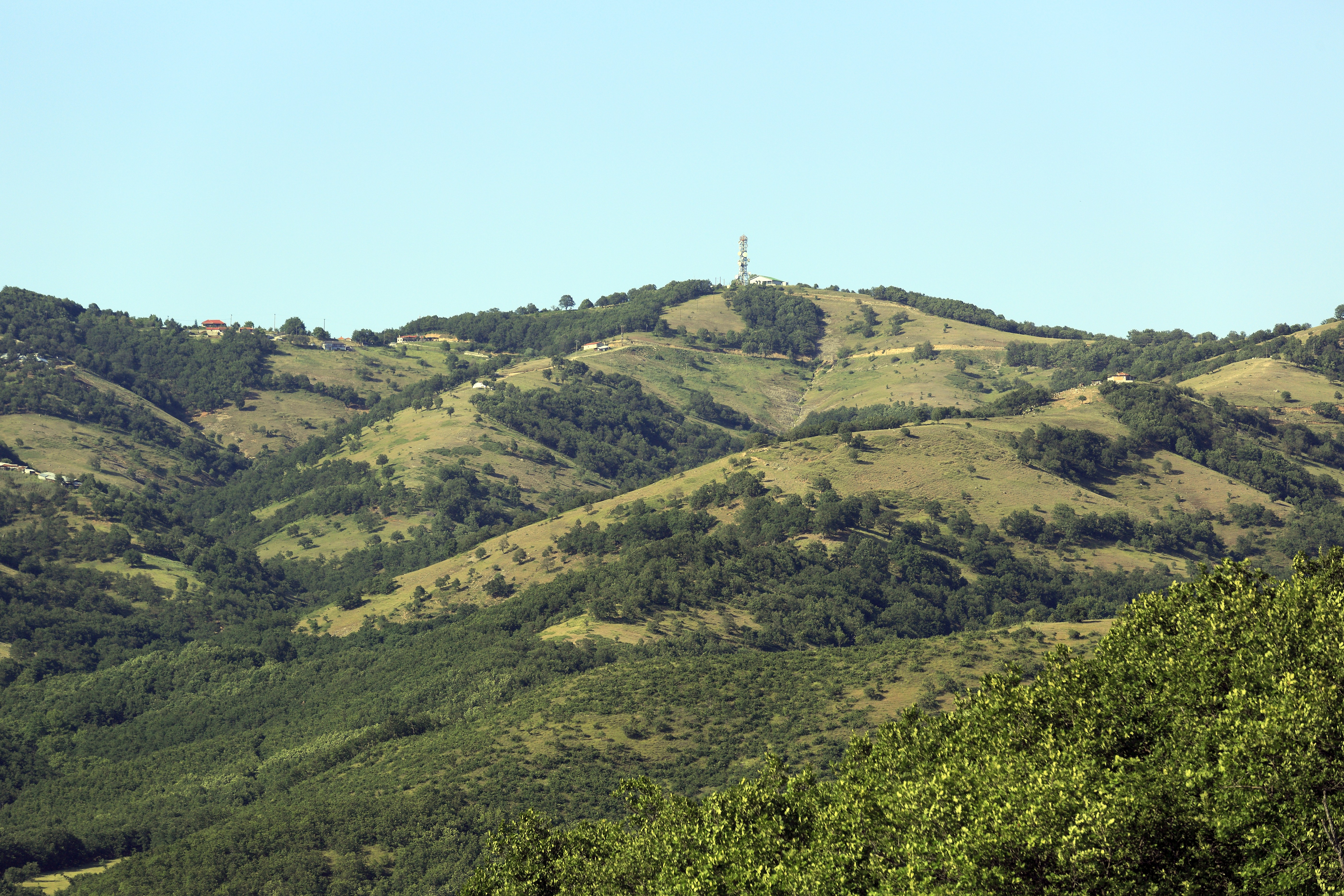
- View of Vlachava (middle left) from the statue of Thymios Vlachavas on St. Dimitrios Rock

- Location within Greece
- Coordinates: 39.7718957846°N 21.6579563819°E
- Country: Greece
- Administrative region: Thessaly
- Regional unit: Trikala
- Municipality: Meteora
- Municipal unit: Kalampaka
- Elevation: 910 m (2,990 ft)

Population (2021)
  - Community: 169
- Time zone: UTC+2 (EET)
  - Summer (DST): UTC+3 (EEST)

Vlachava (Greek: Βλαχάβα) is a village in Meteora municipality, Thessaly, Greece. It is located on a hill overlooking Kalambaka and the Meteora monastery complex.

== Geography ==
The town is situated at 910 meters above sea level. A paved road connects it with Skepari (Σκεπάρι) in the northwest and the monasteries of Meteora to the south.

== Demographics ==
The number of residents varies by season. There are generally a few hundred residents. During the summer, the population doubles.

== Economy ==
The primary economic activities are agriculture and tourism.

== Attractions ==
- A chapel dedicated to the Panagia (Virgin Mary) is located about 6 km north of the village center.

== Notable people ==
- Thymios Vlachavas

== See also ==
- Aromanians
- Chasia
- Antichasia
