= Thymios Vlachavas =

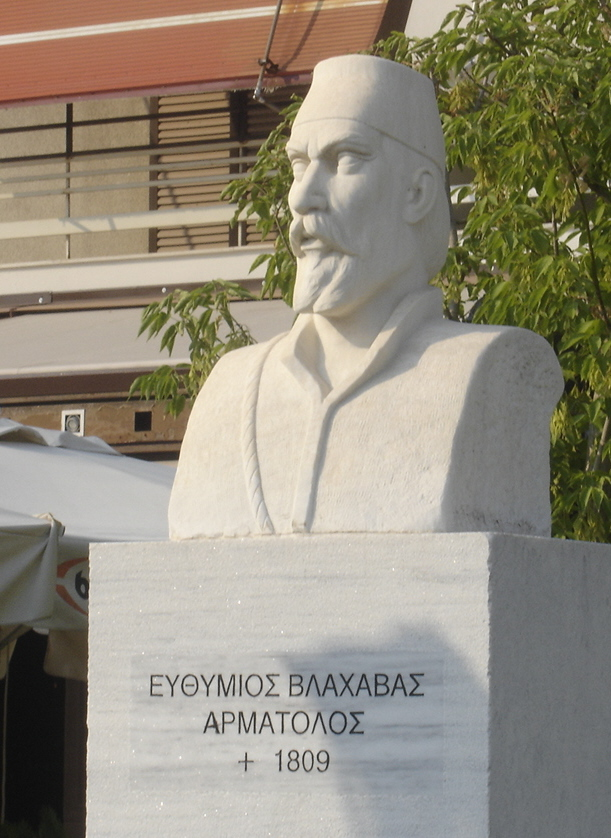
Bust of Thymios Vlachavas in Kalambaka

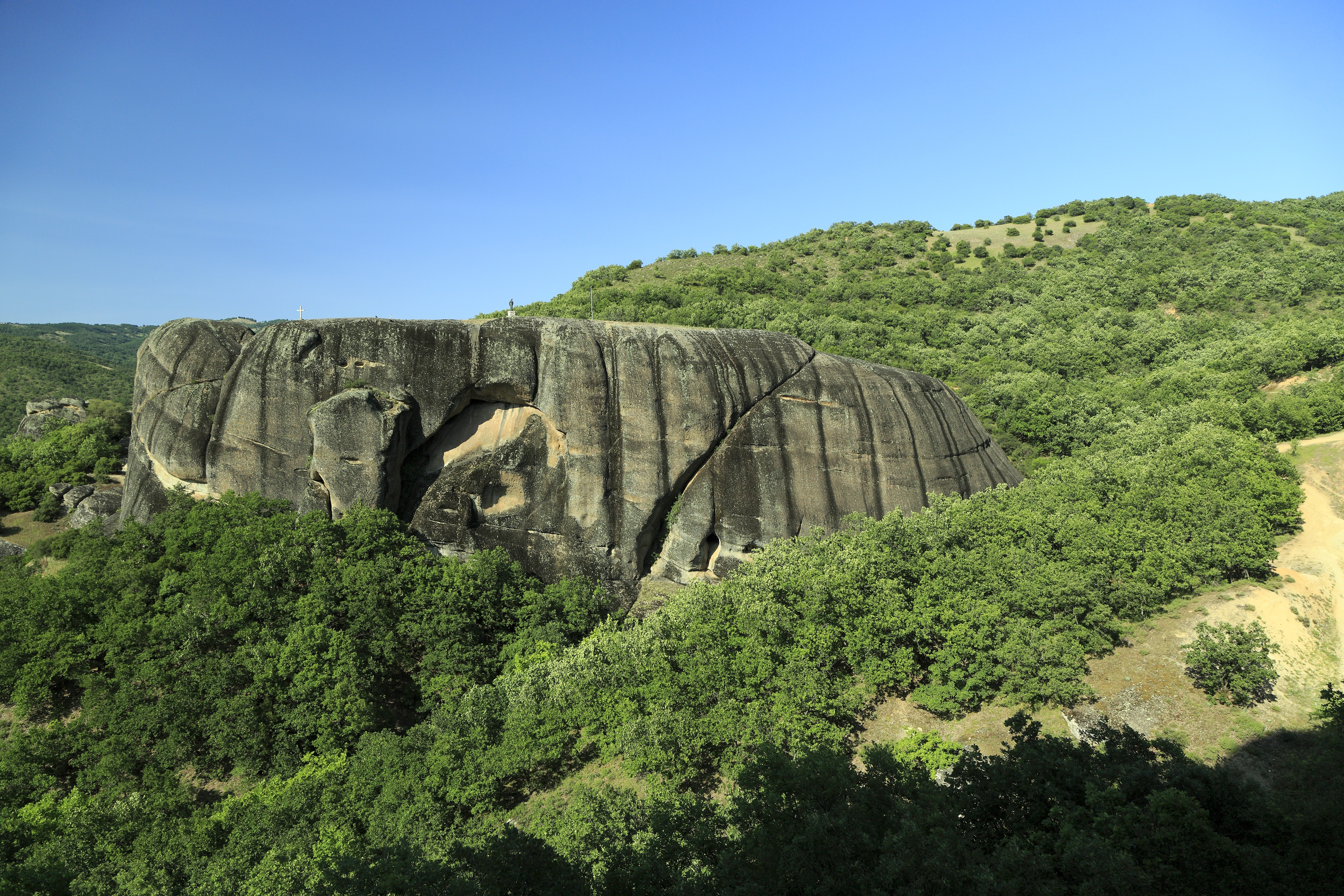
Statue of Thymios Vlachavas (center) on St. Dimitrios Rock in Meteora, as seen from the trail to Ypapantis Monastery

Thymios Vlachavas (Greek: Θύμιος Βλαχάβας, also known as Παπαθύμιος Papathymios; born in Vlachava (also known as Smoliani) in about 1760, died in 1809) was a klepht.

He was the son of Athanasios Vlachavas. In the 19th century, he achieved a prominent position among the other klepht leaders, and led the fight against Ali Pasha, the powerful and semi-independent Ottoman governor of Yanina. Along with others, he prepared a large-scale anti-Ottoman uprising in May 1808, but it was betrayed. Vlachavas was later captured by Ali Pasha by ploy, executed and quartered.

A statue of Thymios Vlachavas has been erected near the former Ypapantis Monastery at Meteora in Thessaly, Greece.
