= Modi (Meteora) =

Rock in Meteora, Greece

Modi Modestos
- Μόδι
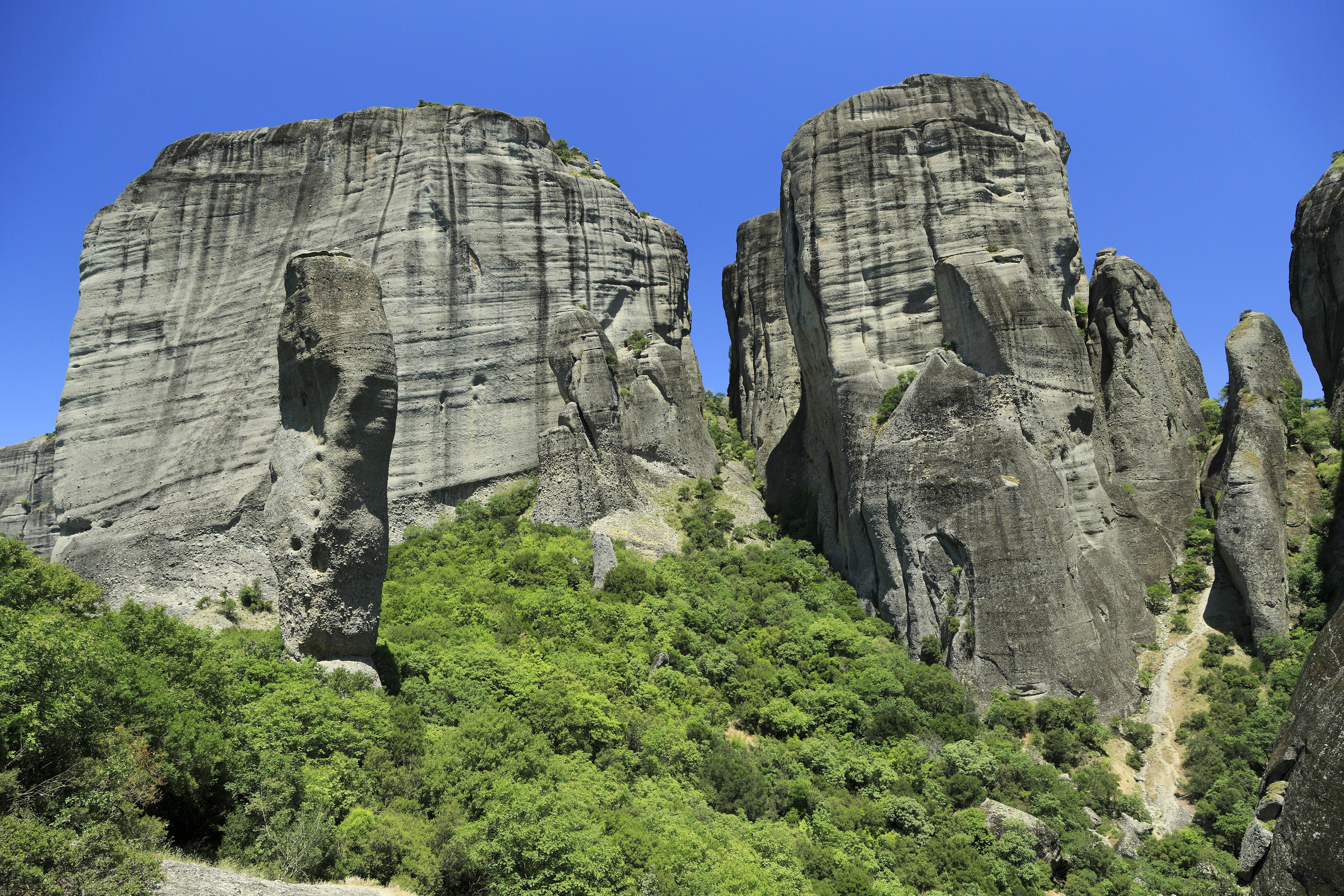
- Modi or Modestos Rock (right half of the photo). Surloti Rock is on the left.

Highest point
- Elevation: 584.5 m (1,918 ft)
- Listing: Rock formations of Greece
- Coordinates: 39.7158188°N 21.6296873°E

Geography
- Location within Greece
- Location: Meteora
- Country: Greece
- Administrative region: Thessaly
- Regional unit: Trikala
- Settlement: Kalabaka

Modi (Greek: Μόδι), also known as Modestos or Agiou Modestou (Greek: Αγίου Μοδέστου), is a rock in the Meteora rock formation complex of Thessaly, Greece.

== Monastery of St. Modestus ==
The Monastery of St. Modestus (Agiou Modestou, Αγίου Μοδέστου) was built around the 12th century on Modesto (Modi) Rock. It was first mentioned in a 12th-century letter and was also mentioned in 1614. The monastery ruins (39.714796°N 21.629437°E) can still be found on Modi Rock.
