= Surloti =

Rock in Meteora, Greece

- Σουρλωτή
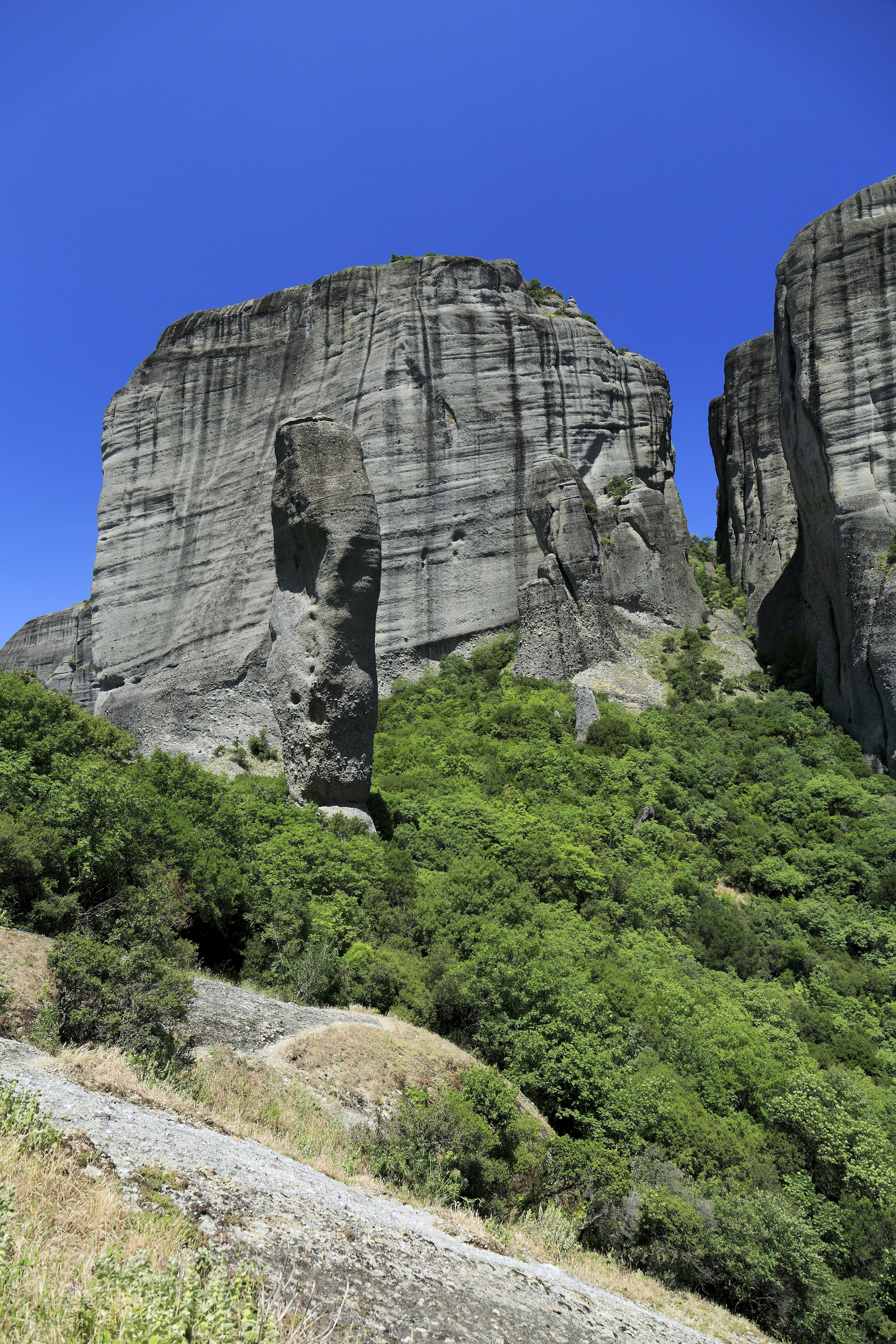

Highest point
- Elevation: 600 m (2,000 ft)
- Coordinates: 39.7150839°N 21.6265123°E

Geography
- Location: Meteora
- Country: Greece
- Administrative region: Thessaly
- Regional unit: Trikala
- Settlement: Kalabaka

Surloti or Sourloti (Greek: Σουρλωτή) is a rock in the Meteora rock formation complex of Thessaly, Greece. It is located on the southern side of the westward-facing valley in which Kastraki, Trikala has been partially settled. Kastraki is a northern suburb of Kalabaka. Opposite Surloti on the northern side of the valley is Holy Spirit Rock. The valley ascends into that part of the Meteora massif containing the highest density of monasteries. Usually from any one monastery one or two others are visible. They all look down into the valley and on Kastraki. Beyond Kastraki can be seen the Pineios River, flowing N-S there.

The Monastery of St. Eustratius (Moni Agios Efstratios, Μονή Αγίου Ευστρατίου) is a little-known monastery on Surloti Rock (βράχου Σουρλωτή).
