= Alysos =

Rock in Meteora, Greece

- Άλυσος
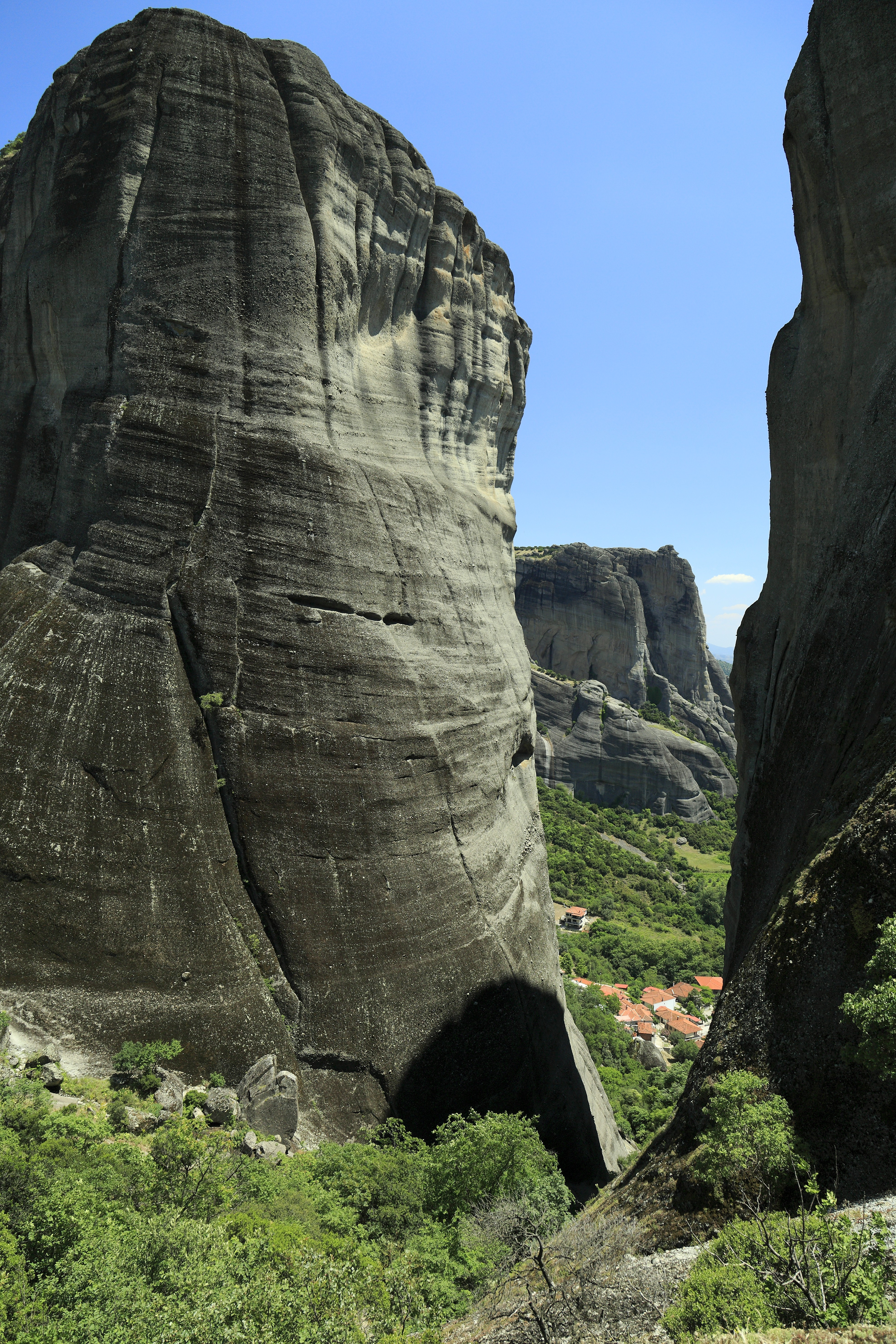

Highest point
- Elevation: 587.8 m (1,928 ft)
- Coordinates: 39°42′49″N 21°37′48″E

Geography
- Location within Greece
- Location: Meteora
- Country: Greece
- Administrative region: Thessaly
- Regional unit: Trikala
- Settlement: Kalabaka

Alysos (Greek: Άλυσος), also known as Altsos (Άλτσος) or Alsos (Άλσος), is a rock in the Meteora rock formation complex of Thessaly, Greece. The rock overlooks the eastern side of the town of Kalabaka.

== Monastery of the Apostle Peter's Chains ==
The Monastery of the Apostle Peter's Chains (Alyseos Apostolou Petrou, Αλύσεως Αποστόλου Πέτρου) on Alysos Rock was probably built around 1400. The ruins (39.712752°N 21.629524°E) can still be found on the rock today. In full, the monastery is known as the Monastery of the Veneration of the Chains of the Apostle Peter (Greek: Μονή προσκυνήσεως της αλύσεως του Αποστόλου Πέτρου, romanized: Moni Proskyniseos tis Alyseos tou Apostolou Petrou).
