= List of Alaska Native inventors and scientists =

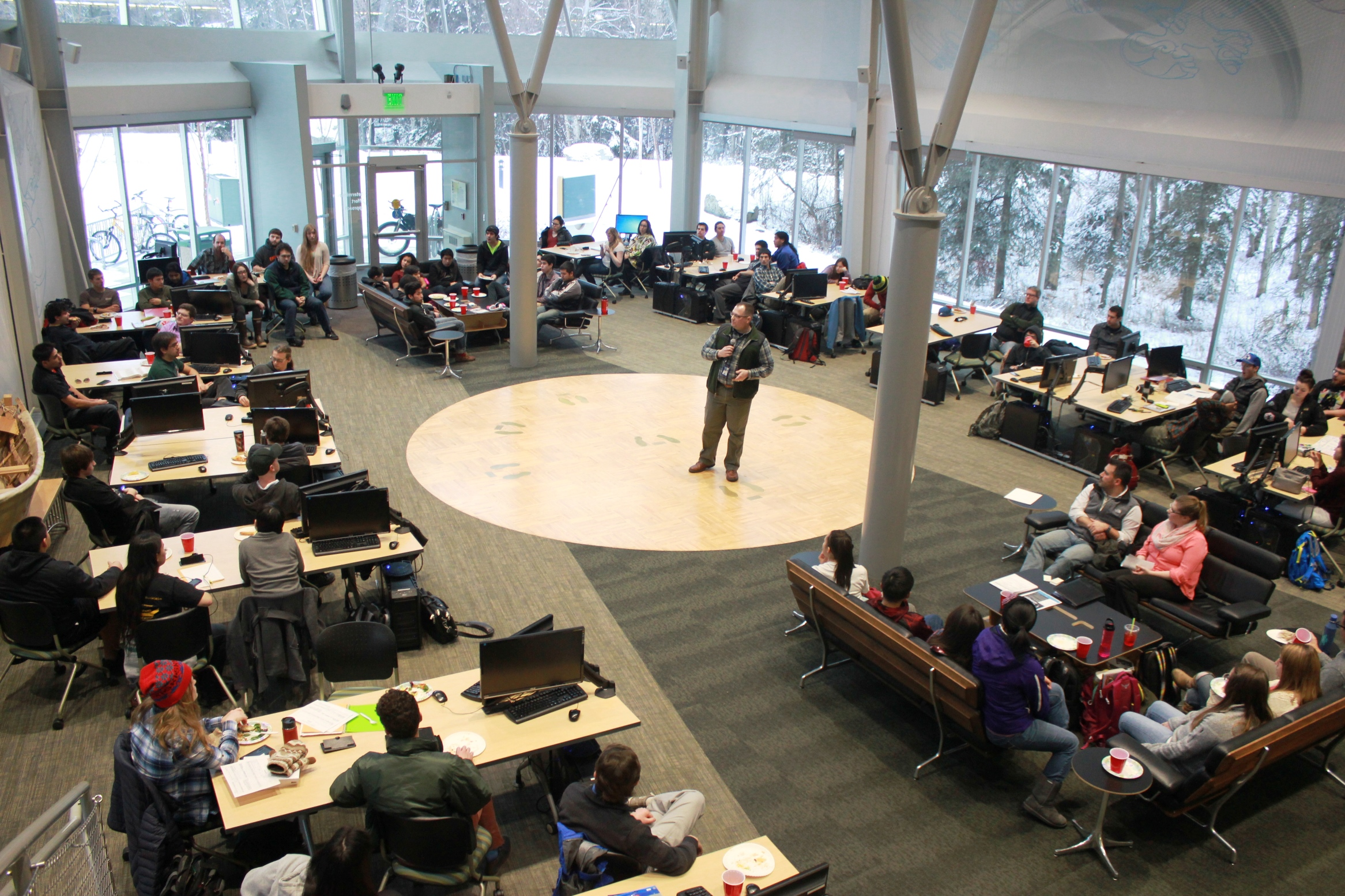
Alaska Native Science and Engineering Program

The following list of Alaska Native inventors and scientists begins to document Alaska Natives with deep historical and ecological knowledge about system-wide health, knowledge that in many cases precedes and exceeds discoveries published in the scientific literature.

For more than century, Alaska Native naturalists have entered into collaborative relationships with scientists working in the field or in their communities (International Polar Year (IPY), Native Contributions to Arctic Science, Barrow Arctic Research Center). Their many contributions extend from indigenous ways of knowing to practical and applied inventions needed to subsist from the land, air, and waters (Sharing Knowledge Smithsonian Exhibit).

As institutions strive to decolonize, indigenous-settler relationships remain contentious and marked by structural inequities. In the history of the New World, Old World explorers and settlers often relied for their survival on the knowledge and wisdom of indigenous peoples.

While this list focuses on individual biographies, there are many other collaborative projects (e.g., Barrow Arctic Research Center). In addition to recognizing community-based participatory research (CBPR), this list credits the organizations that develop and advocate for the education of future indigenous scientists and engineers, young scholars who will increase the number of indigenous scientists and engineers earning degrees. According to a 2019 report from the National Center for Science and Engineering Statistics, fewer than 1% of bachelor's degrees in science and engineering programs go to American Indian, Alaska Native, Native Hawaiian, or other Pacific Islanders. These organizations include American Indian Science and Engineering Society (AISES) and Alaska Native Science and Engineering Program (ANSEP), Recruitment and Retention of American Indians into Nursing (RRAIN), and Recruitment and Retention of Alaska Natives into Nursing (RRANN).

== Inventors and scientists ==
Name	Years	Tribal Affiliation	Degree Knowledge area	Citations
Billy Adams	1965-	Iñupiat	Utqiagvik – NSB Department of Wildlife Management – extensive experience (30+ years) working with scientists, and continues to inform marine mammal and ice scientists	
Harry Brower Sr.	1924–1992	Iñupiat	See The Whales, they give themselves, and Fifty More Year Below Zero: Tributes and Meditations for the Naval Arctic Laboratory's first half century at Barrow, Alaska	
Patricia Longley Cochran		Iñupiat		
Stanley Edwin		Gwich'in	UAF – Atmospheric Sciences, Climatology – PhD	
Sven Haakanson	1967-	Alutiiq		
Al Hopson, Sr. or Eben Hopson		Iñupiat	See Fifty More Year Below Zero: Tributes and Meditations for the Naval Arctic; Laboratory's first half century at Barrow, Alaska	
Orville Huntington		Athabaskan	B.S. Wildlife Biology, Climate Change, Indigenous Knowledge, Subsistence, Alaska Native Corporations	
Paul John	1929–2015	Yup'ik		book review
Teresa Arevgaq John		Yup'ik		
Oscar Kawagley	1934–2011	Yup'ik	traditional knowledge and science educator	
Della Keats	1907–1996	Iñupiat	Healer, midwife	
Joe Leavitt	1959-	Iñupiat	Utqiagvik – extensive experience (40+ years) working as consultant with ice scientists.	
Ilarion (Larry) Merculieff	circa 1950	Aleut		
Simon Paneak	1900–1975	Iñupiat	See Fifty More Year Below Zero: Tributes and Meditations for the Naval Arctic; Laboratory's first half century at Barrow, Alaska	
Peter Sovalik	1910–1977	Iñupiat	An Original Arctic Naturalist, by Robert E. Henshaw and Max C. Brewer 2001	
Tina Marie Woods		Aleut	PhD in Clinical-Community Psychology with a Rural Indigenous Emphasis from the University of Alaska Anchorage. Worked within the Alaska Tribal Health System for over 15 years, with much time administering the Aleutian Pribilof Islands Association.	

== Native science organizations ==
- Sitka Tribe
- Yukon River Inter-Tribal Watershed Council
- Native American Research Center for Health

== See also ==
- Traditional Alaska Native medicine
- Traditional ecological knowledge
- Traditional knowledge

== Resources ==
- Brower, H., & Brewster, K. (2004). The whales, they give themselves: Conversations with Harry Brower, Sr (No. 4). Univ of Alaska Pr.
- Eben Hopson Memorial Archives: Celebrate the life and leadership of the late Eben Hopson
- Sea Ice Project Jukebox (This project includes oral history recordings of residents of northern Alaska talking about sea ice conditions, observations over time, and changes that are occurring. The collection includes archival interviews recorded from 1978 to 1980 as part of a study related to potential offshore oil development, and from 2008–2009 as part of a Geophysics PhD project about sea ice thickness along spring whaling trails offshore of Utqiaġvik (Barrow)).
- Sturm, M. (2002). Fifty More Years below Zero: Tributes and Meditations for the Naval Arctic Research Laboratory's First Half Century.
