= Alutiiq Tribe of Old Harbor =

Federally recognized Alaska Native tribe

Alutiiq Tribe of Old Harbor Nuniami (Alutiiq)
- Alaska Native village
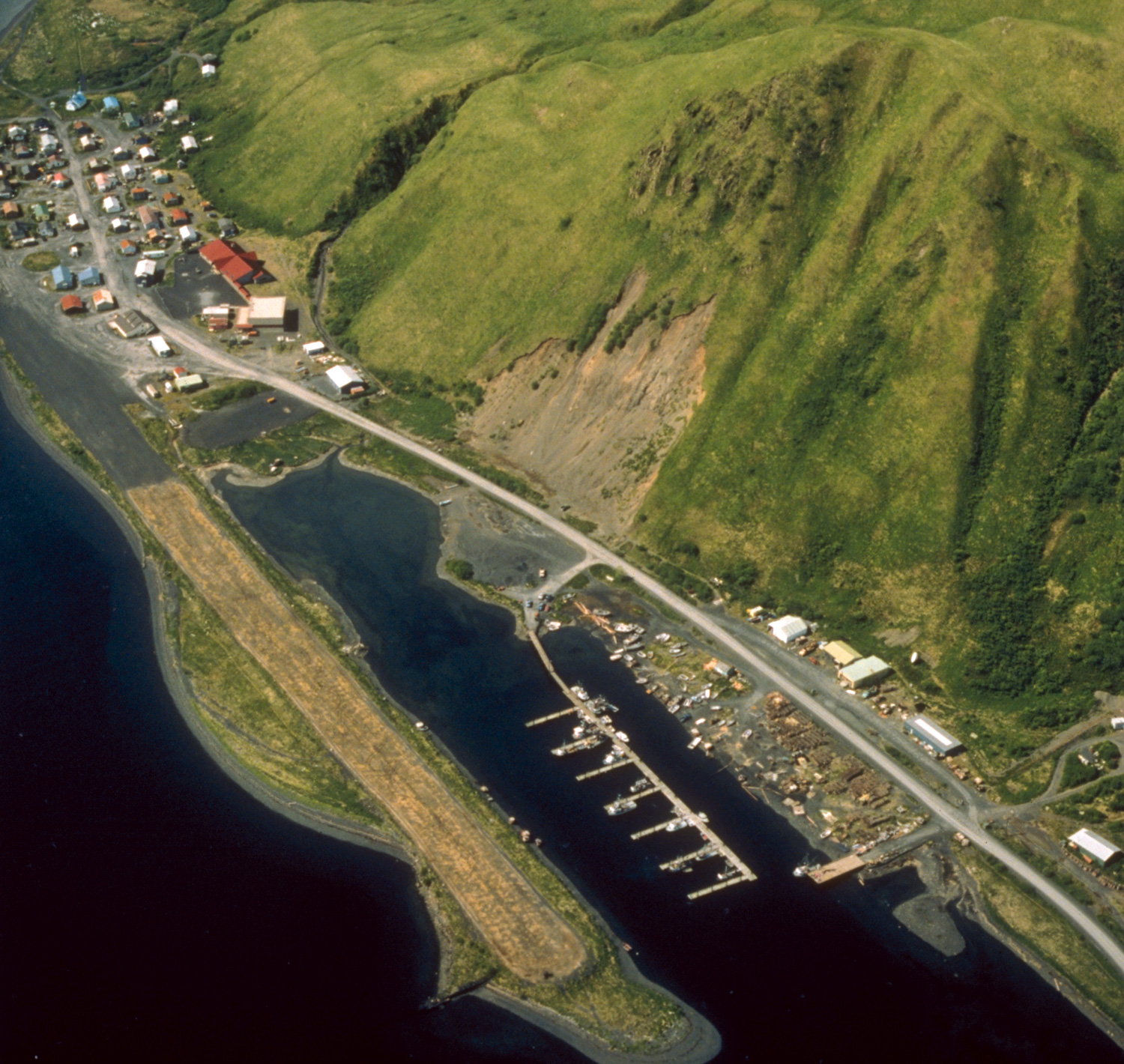
- Aeriel view of Old Harbor

- Location within Alaska
- Coordinates: 57°12′09″N 153°18′20″W
- Established: 1968; 58 years ago
- Capital: Old Harbor, Alaska

Government
  - Type: Representative democracy
  - Body: Old Harbor Tribal Council
  - Chief: Jeffrey Peterson

Population
  - Estimate: 750
- Demonym(s): Old Harbor Alutiiq, Koniag Alutiiq
- Time zone: UTC–09:00 (AKST)
  - Summer (DST): UTC–08:00 (AKDT)
- Website: sites.google.com/alutiiqtribe.org/main/home

The Alutiiq Tribe of Old Harbor is a federally recognized Alaska Native tribe of Koniaq Alutiiq people. This Alaska Native tribe is headquartered in Old Harbor, Alaska, (Alutiiq: Nuniami) and has 750 enrolled citizens.

The tribe was formerly known as the Village of Old Harbor and the Native Village of Old Harbor.

== Government ==
The Alutiiq Tribe of Old Harbor is led by a democratically elected tribal council. Its chief is Jeffrey Peterson. The Alaska Regional Office of the Bureau of Indian Affairs serves the tribe.

== Territory ==
The tribe's headquarters, Old Harbor, is one of six Alutiiq villages on Kodiak Island. Located on the southern coast of the island, Old Harbor is near Three Saints Bay and Sitkalidak Strait and is located about 40 miles southeast of Kodiak, Alaska. The community has the Old Harbor Airport and a boat harbor.

== Economy ==
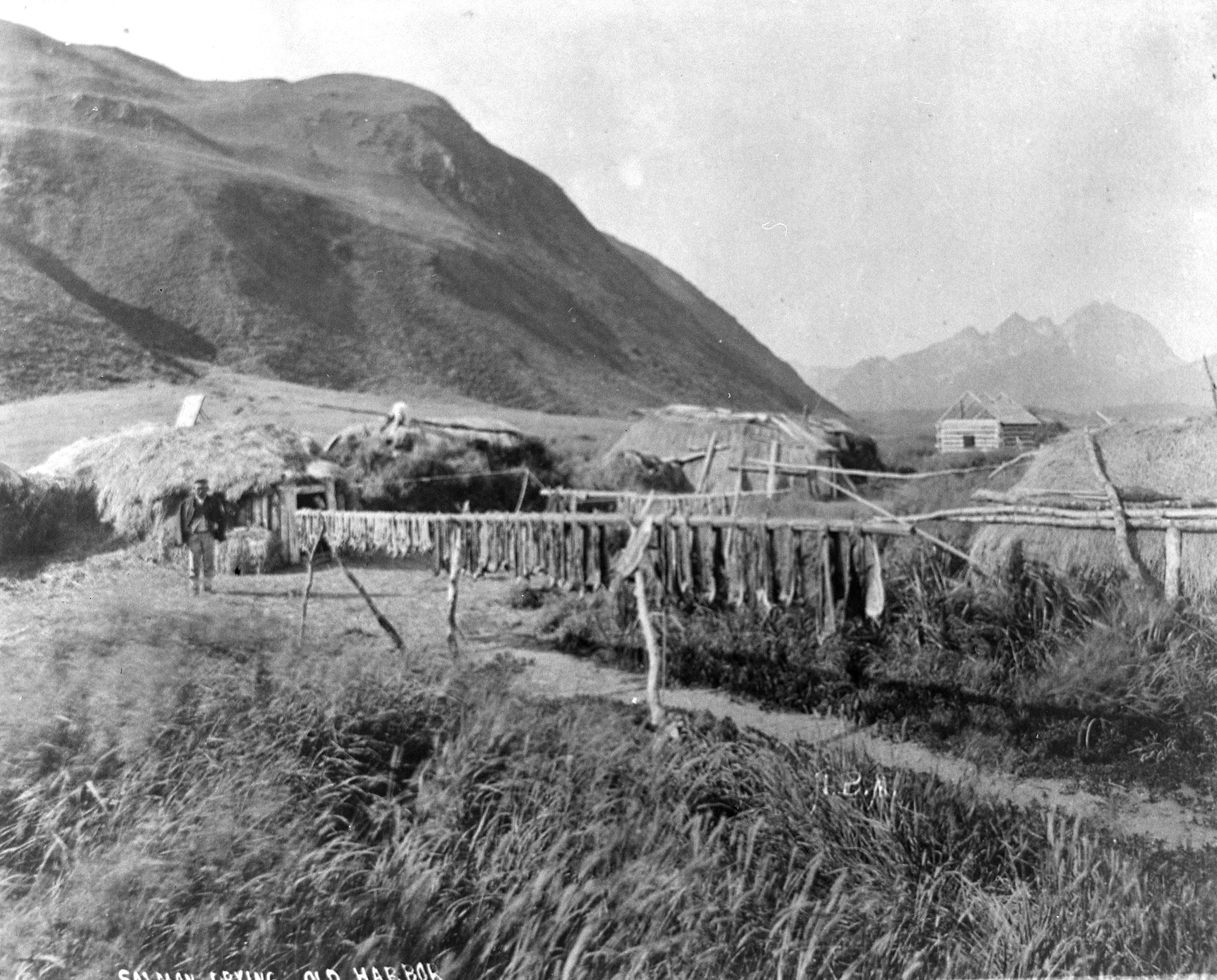
Salmon drying in the Alutiiq village of Old Harbor, 1889

Ecotourism, commercial fishing, and subsistence fishing and hunting are important to the tribe's livelihood. The Alutiiq Tribe of Old Harbor is affiliated with Koniag, Incorporated, an Alaska Native corporation, and Old Harbor Native Corporation, an ANCSA Village Corporation. Old Harbor has three hotels and a few bed and breakfasts to accommodate visitors.

The town has one convenience store, and commercial food is estimated to be two to three times more expensive than in the Lower 48 states. The USDA has proposed providing bison from Old Harbor Alliance and salmon from Kodiak Island WildSource to community members relying on the Supplemental Nutrition Assistance Program.

== Communications ==
The tribe received a $500,000 grant to develop broadband internet through the Broadband Infrastructure Deployment project.

== Language and culture ==
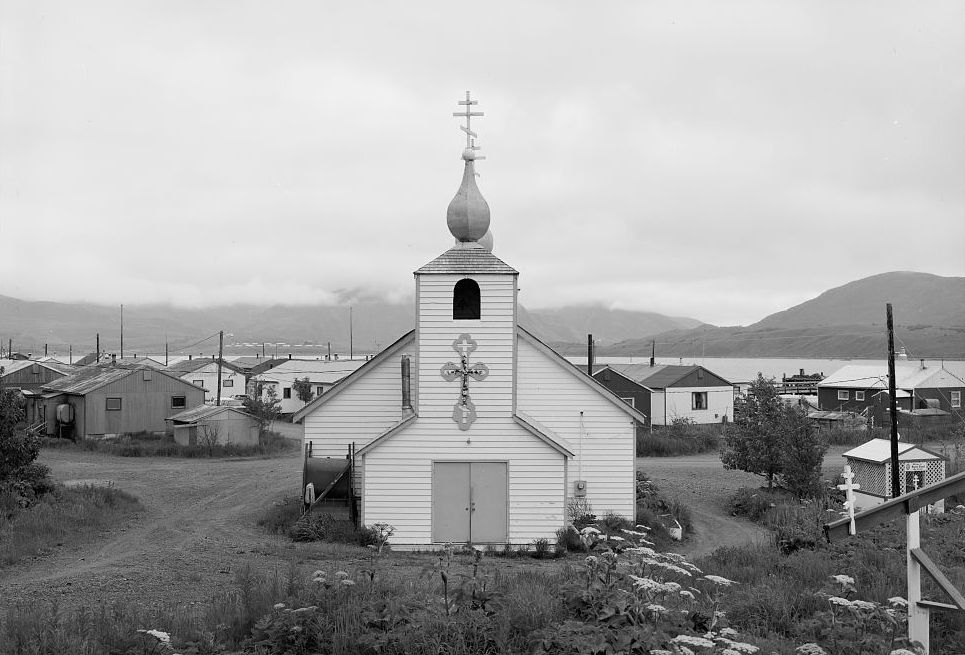
Three Saints Orthodox Church in Old Harbor

The Alutiiq Tribe of Old Harbor speaks English and the Alutiiq language, which is taught at the Alutiiq Museum in nearby Kodiak. Nuniaq Alutiiq Dancers is a prominent dance troupe in the community.

The local public school hosts an annual Alutiiq Week to celebrate culture. Each summer the Nuniaq cultural camp teaches students at Sitkalidak Island.

Tribal citizens participate in Sugpiaq religion and the Orthodox Christian religion.

== Climate change ==
Alaska Natives are already feeling the effects of climate change from increased fires, harsher storms, melting permafrost, erosion along the coasts, and weather patterns shifting. To address these threats, in 2006, 162 Alaska Native tribes, including the Alutiiq Tribe of Old Harbor, and corporations working with the Native American Rights Fund, signed a Climate Change resolution calling upon Congress to pass laws to reduce greenhouse gas emissions.

== Notable tribal citizens ==
- Sven Haakanson Jr. (born 1967), Burke Museum curator and professor of anthropology at the University of Washington, Seattle

== See also ==
- Awa'uq Massacre, 1784 attack and massacre of Koniag Alutiiq people near Old Harbor
