= Linda Infante Lyons =

American artist (born 1959)

- Born: Linda Anne Infante Lyons; 1959 (age 66–67)
- Education: Whitman College (BA, biology), Viña del Mar Escuela de Bellas Artes in Chile
- Occupation: Native American visual media artist
- Known for: regionalism, focus on Alaska
- Notable work: St. Katherine of Karluk (2016), The Alutiiq Madonna (2017), Dandelions (2015), Sunset at Pyramid Mountain (2019)
- Spouse: Graham Dane

Linda Anne Infante Lyons (born 1959) is a Native American visual media artist from Anchorage, Alaska. She is Alutiiq, with her mother's family descending from Kodiak Island, and Estonian. The island's natives experienced two waves of colonization, which plays a central role in Lyons' artwork.

== Personal life and education ==
Lyons attended Whitman College in Walla Walla, Washington, where she received a BA in biology. She then studied at Viña del Mar Escuela de Bellas Artes in Chile from 1996 to 1998. Lyons remained in Chile for about eighteen years to focus on her painting and building a community before returning to Alaska, where she shares a studio in Mountain View with her husband Graham Dane.

Aside from working as an independent artist, Lyons also works with the Alaska State Council in the Arts and travels to schools to teach painting to the children.

== Artwork ==
=== Paintings ===
In my portraits, I simplify form to the most essential to describe a realm of spiritual realities. I am consistently lured by the promise of transcendence and the possibility of discovery in each new piece of work. ~ Linda Infante Lyons

Lyons has been described as a magical realist and a regionalist because of her technique and focus on Alaska. She has stated that she views herself as more of an "emotional realist", as her landscapes can be inspired by her experiences and emotions rather than one exact location. Lyons intends for her artwork to evoke emotions in the viewer, as well as create a sense of familiarity and curiosity about the unknown.

In an Artist Talk presentation given at the end of her residency with the Alaska State Museum, Lyons claimed that her art was influenced by "the abstract of sublime", which she states is conveyed through her juxtaposition of land formations such as volcanoes in the background of seemingly serene landscapes. Lyons' landscapes have "hush stillness" because there is no presence of humans. Some prominent features of her work include unidentifiable locations with seemingly never-ending bodies of water, land and ice formations, and plants and animals.

Lyons has also painted a series of portraits, which were inspired by the theme of colonization in art. In the series, she painted portraits of indigenous women in traditional clothing holding animals with halos around their heads. Per the artist, this is meant to represent her spirituality and display Alutiiq and Russian heritage as having equal importance. By re-appropriating the Russian Orthodox iconography and incorporating the Alutiiq masks from the Pinart Collection in France, Lyons is "not dismissing" either culture suggesting that both cultures are equals. The women in her portraits are all based on family and friends and are usually holding an animal, as they are believed to be a link between the physical and spiritual world in many Native American cultures. In all of her portraits, the Alutiiq women are centered on the page and in a "power pose" that was once considered "sacrilegious" and only reserved for men.

Linda Infante Lyons personally believes that all things on this planet have a "spiritual entity" and are all connected. This belief stems from spending summers with her grandparents as a child learning about the Alutiiq's spiritual practices and beliefs from her grandmother. As an artist, she explores the duality and interconnectedness of the world through her "simplified forms" in all of her artworks.

Linda Infante Lyons also painted the cover art for Paul Brynner's book titled "Conception of the Sphinx."

=== Photography ===
Lyons became interested in photography after taking reference photographs to help inspire her in her studio. Her photography has been honorably mentioned by the Anchorage Museum at Rasmuson Center as a part of their annual Rarefied Light Exhibits.

=== Public Art ===
Linda Infante Lyons has created several pieces of public art in locations such as the Hispanic Cultural Center in Mountain View, where she painted a mural of rufous hummingbirds, intended to be symbolic of the diversity in Alaska. Lyons also painted a mural on the 100-foot wall at the Government Hill Commons and Community Orchard in Anchorage and a mural for the Healthy Alaska Natives Foundation as a part of The Water is Life project.

== Themes ==
The theme of Decolonizing Alaska has been dominant in her portrait work. Her ancestors from Kodiak Island were first colonized by Russia and then the United States. Their culture has taken a "devastating" hit as they were to assimilate into two distinct communities while encouraged to forget their own. This art movement emerged as the result of the University of Alaska Museum of the North working with both Native and non-Native artists that "identify with the theme" to dissolve stigma and recognize the effects of colonialism in art. Through this art movement, Linda Infante Lyons has been able to further explore her heritage and attempt to "restore [her] culture" after colonialism. She is interpreting cultural imagery with lost techniques and motifs while presenting her Alutiiq and Russian heritage as equals. By reappropriating the Russian Orthodox iconography and incorporating the Alutiiq masks from the Pinart Collection in France, Lyons is "opening up a conversation" about the "devastating" blow her culture endured during colonialism. This theme has further been explored by the artist in a curated collection titled All Things Sacred for the Bunnell Street Arts Center in 2017.

== Residencies and Exhibits ==
As an artist, Linda has been able to explore the world and become inspired by diversity. Lyons has been the recipient of the Rasmuson Foundation Fellowship Art Residency at the Santa Fe Arts Institute in collaboration with the Institute of American Indian Art, the Denali National Park and Preserve Artist Residency, and went to Germany for residency at the Mayer of Munich Architectural Glass Studio. She spent two months in Santa Fe as a resident and saw various similarities between the "vast endlessness" that Santa Fe and Alaska share. The land formations and warmer colors found their way into her artworks and photography. At Denali, Lyons stayed in a cabin by herself for ten days and immersed herself in the wilderness. She made sketches and took pictures of her sources of inspiration and at the end of her residency, she donated the painting titled "Denali, the Source" to the park. Lyons went to Germany with the intent to learn how to translate her oil paintings into glass mosaics.

Linda Infante Lyons has had painting collections featured in Alaskan museums and galleries such as Open Space/ Open Mind and All Things Sacred at the Bunnell Street Art Center, Ebb and Flow at the Alaska State Museum, and Sites Unseen as a joint exhibition with her husband at the Alaska Humanities Forum.

== Selected Exhibits ==
=== Permanent Collections ===
- Alaska Contemporary Art Bank
- Alaska State Museum
- Alutiiq Museum and archeological Repository
- Anchorage Museum at Rasmuson Center

=== Painting ===
- Alaska State Museum
- Alaska Contemporary Art Bank
- Alaska Native Arts Foundation
- Alaska Humanities Forum
- Alutiiq Museum and Archaeological Repository
- Anchorage Museum at Rasmuson Center
- Artique Gallery in Anchorage Alaska
- Bunnell Street Arts Gallery
- Museum of the North at the University of Alaska Fairbanks

=== Photography ===
- International Gallery of Contemporary Art
- Out North Gallery
- Ratified Light, Anchorage Museum at Rasmuson Center

== Awards and Fellowships ==
- Rasmuson Individual Project Award (2013)
- Denali National Park and Preserve Artist Residency (2014)
- Rasmuson Foundation Fellowship Art Residency Santa Fe Arts Institute/ Institute of American Indian Art Residency (2015)
- Rasmuson Foundation Individual Artist Award (2016)
- Native Arts & Cultures Foundation National Artist Fellowship (2018)
- Atwood Foundation Artist Grant (2018)
- Mayer of Munich Architectural Glass Studio

== Paintings ==
=== St. Katherine of Karluk (2016) ===
In St. Katherine of Karluk, Linda Infante Lyons painted an Alaskan shaman holding a sacred seal. It is part of the permanent collection of the Museum of the North. The shaman is wearing red and gold traditional Native American clothing, with her chin decorated, and both figures have halos. The halo that is around the woman is adorned with sacred Alutiiq symbols that come from Kodiak masks discovered in a French museum as part of the Pinart Collection. The seal is an important part of Kodiak culture so the shaman is carrying it as a Christian Madonna would hold baby Jesus Christ. The plant that the seal is holding is pushiki, a local Kodiak plant. In this particular painting, the woman in the portrait is her great-grandmother. She is not rejecting Christianity and instead pays homage to her family's Native roots with this interpretation of the Madonna and her Child.

=== The Alutiiq Madonna (2017) ===
In The Alutiiq Madonna, Linda Infante Lyons has taken a commonly painted Christian icon and incorporated Alutiiq iconography. The Alutiiq woman is holding a European child and demonstrates the impact of colonialism as this Madonna has been influential to both Native and non-Native people. The masks in the halo represent the sacred Kodiak masks that were at the Alutiiq Museum owned by Château Musée Boulogne-sur-Mer. The child is holding a wooden, for lack of a better word, doll. This painting follows the same composition that her portraits in her All Things Sacred collection.

=== Dandelions (2015) ===
Dandelions was one of the landscape paintings featured in Linda Infante Lyons' solo exhibition entitled Ebb and Flow at the Alaska State Museum and is part of the permanent collection at the Museum of the North. This landscape features the prominent dandelions blooming and stretching towards the sky in front of an unidentifiable land formation. Much like many of her other paintings, the sublime is present in how she painted the sky meant to evoke emotion and a sense of wonder in the viewer. The green and yellow color palette and softly defined background allow the flowers to be the central focus piece of the landscape.

=== Serenity Bay ===
Serenity Bay is a landscape that was exhibited at the Alaska State Museum. The scene depicts a calm bay in between rock formations with a fuming volcano in the distance. There are circular and coned trees on the shore. This artwork demonstrate sublime as the calm before a storm. The water is still and the sunset is painted with a lighter color palette. The volcano creates contrast in the land formations featured in the scene and has smoke surrounding the top of it. The color palette is not dark and features lighter shades of purple with darker shades of blue that create the shadows and create contrast between the land formation and sky.

=== Sunset at Pyramid Mountain (2019) ===
Sunset at Pyramid Mountain was part of the "Nunat–Lands" exhibit at the Alutiiq Museum and Archaeological Repository. This oil painting depicts Chiniak Bay that is in the Kodiak Island Borough. The landscape depicts an orange sky with gray clouds, a mountain range beyond the Kodiak body of water and has vegetation in the foreground of the canvas. It was one of two paintings created by the artist to be acquired by the museum in 2019. April Counceller, the museum's executive director, has noted that although the artworks are "non-traditional" when compared to the graphic art style of the Alutiiq, one is still able to look at Lyons' work and "know it's Alutiiq."

== Photography ==
=== Going Nowhere, Wales, Alaska (2014) ===
Going Nowhere, Wales, Ak is a photograph by Linda Infante Lyons and part of the Rarified Light Art Exhibit by the Anchorage Museum at Rasmuson Center. This honorable mention captures a red construction vehicle covered in snow with the Alaskan mountains of the Bering Sea behind it. There is also a shed in the background of the heavily contrasted photograph. Overall, this image conveys the vast environment that is characteristic of Alaska with only one residence or business in sight.

== Public Art ==
=== Los Picaflores (2015) ===
Lyons painted two picaflores, or hummingbirds, are surrounding a centralized red flower with hills and a body of water behind it. The rufous hummingbird depicted was chosen to symbolize diversity in Alaska because it migrates between Mexico and southern Alaska. This mural resides on the side of the Mountain View Hispanic Cultural Center in Anchorage, Alaska.

=== A River Flows Through Us (2016) ===
This landscape mural shows an aerial view of a body of water and was done for the Water is Life project which "promotes pride and ownership in Tribal drinking water and water systems." This mural was composed to reflect the idea of "connectivity and continuity" in nature and this community.

=== Capitol Hills Commons Mural (2018) ===
The mural features silhouetted weeds on a 100-foot wall on the side of the Praise Temple that is the backdrop for the community orchard. The stenciled on design was inspired by the weeds that were on the previously abandoned lot. The mural was funded by the Atwood Foundation grant she received.
