= Sven Haakanson =

Native American anthropologist

Sven Haakanson, Jr. (born 1967, Alutiiq) is a Native American anthropologist who specializes in documenting and preserving the language and culture of the Alutiiq. From 2000 to 2013, he served as Executive Director of the Alutiiq Museum in Kodiak, Alaska. He is a Professor of Anthropology at the University of Washington, Seattle, and Curator of North American Anthropology at the Burke Museum. In 2007 he was named as a MacArthur Fellow for being a leader in the effort to rekindle Alutiiq language, customs, and culture.

== Early life and education ==
Sven Haakanson Jr. was born in Old Harbor, Alaska, a small, remote island village, into the Alutiiq Village of Old Harbor.^{a} His father, Sven Haakanson Sr., was a community leader serving as the mayor of Old Harbor and president of the Old Harbor Tribal Council. As a child, Haakanson never heard about the history of the Alutiiq in school. When he tried to ask the tribal elders about how their ancestors lived in the past, only one told him about the traditions. That single elder taught Haakanson the Alutiiq language and the culture of the Alutiiq people.

Haakanson attended the University of Alaska Fairbanks and graduated with a bachelor's in English in 1992. While in college, Haakanson was invited to attend the Inuit Studies Conference in Copenhagen, Denmark. At the conference, he attended a lecture on Alutiiq culture. Looking back on the experience, he remarked, "I wondered why I had traveled to the other side of the world to learn about Alutiiq history and culture when I could be doing the same thing at home." Haakanson spent a year in Russia while a UAF undergraduate in 1991. He taught English in the port town of Magadan on Russia’s northeast coast. While in Magadan he became interested in the Nenet people of the Yamal Peninsula. Parts of their history are the content of his 2000 doctoral dissertation at Harvard University.

Haakanson continued his studies as a graduate student in anthropology at Harvard University in 1992, receiving his MA in 1996 and PhD in 2000. The title of his doctoral dissertation was Ethnoarchaeology of the Yamal Nenets: utilizing emic and etic evidence in the interpretation of archaeological residues.

== Research ==
Haakanson's research centers around documenting and preserving the language and culture of the Alutiit. In the early 21st century, there are only 24 fluent speakers of the Alutiiq language. Because of this, there is a focus on recording everyday speech.

Haakanson was the executive director of the Alutiiq Museum and adjunct professor at Kodiak College from 2000 to 2013. Since 2009, he has served as a board member of the Native Arts and Cultures Foundation.

In 2013 he became associate professor at the University of Washington Department of Anthropology in Seattle. He also served as curator of Native American collections at the University's Burke Museum. Haakanson gained tenure in early 2016.

In 2015 he led the Angyaaq project, to restore and practice skills for making native, traditional transport vessels. Russian explorers destroyed these native transport vessels for their practical and cultural value. Until Haakanson began this project, Angyaaqs had not been built on Kodiak Island for more than 150 years.

== Awards ==
- 2007 MacArthur Fellows Program
- In 2007 People Magazine staff named Sven “sexiest anthropologist”, he was touted as low maintenance and high energy. When interviewed he said “The thing I can’t live without is my family. Everything else I can do without”

== In popular culture ==
Haakanson was interviewed in the Werner Herzog documentary film Grizzly Man (2005).

== Bibliography ==
- Haakanson, Sven David (2000). Ethnoarchaeology of the Yamal Nenets: Utilizing Emic and Etic Evidence in the Interpretation of Archaeological Residues. Ethnoarchaeology (PhD). Harvard University. pp. 472 pages.
- (editor) Giinaquq: Like a Face: Suqpiaq Masks of the Kodiak Archipelago (University of Alaska Press, 2009) ISBN 9781602230491
- (editor) Kal'unek-from Karluk: Kodiak Alutiiq History and the Archaeology of the Karluk One Village Site (University of Alaska Press, 2015) ISBN 9781602232440

== See also ==
- Awa'uq Massacre
- List of Alaska Native inventors and scientists

== Notes ==
- ^a The Alutiiq People are known by many names, including the Pacific Yupik and the Sugpiaq. Alutiiq is used throughout for consistency reasons due to the lack of another preferred name.

== Sources ==
- Braun, David (2011). "For Alaska's Alutiiq, the Future May Be Found in the Past". National Geographic Society. Archived from the original on August 13, 2011.
- Fitzhugh, Ben (2003). The Evolution of Complex Hunter-Gatherers: Archaeological Evidence from the North Pacific. New York: Springer. ISBN 978-0-306-47853-6.
- Nicholas, George (2010). Being and Becoming Indigenous Archaeologists. Walnut Creek, CA: Left Coast Press. ISBN 978-1-59874-497-2.
- Rostkowski, Joėlle (2012). Conversations With Remarkable Native Americans. Albany: SUNY Press. ISBN 978-1-4384-4175-7.
- "Sven Haakanson". MacArthur Foundation. 2007.
- "Sven Haakanson - New Board Member". Native Arts & Cultures Foundation. 2009.
- "Sven Haakanson, Sr". National Museum of Natural History, Smithsonian Institution. 2012.
