= List of museums in Alaska =

This list of museums in Alaska is a list of museums, defined for this context as institutions (including nonprofit organizations, government entities, and private businesses) that collect and care for objects of cultural, artistic, scientific, or historical interest and make their collections or related exhibits available for public viewing. Museums that exist only in cyberspace (i.e., virtual museums) are not included.

== Museums ==
Name	Town/City	Borough/Census Area	Region	type	Summary
Alaska Aviation Museum	Anchorage	Anchorage	Southcentral	Aviation	Historic aircraft and aviation history of Alaska
Alaska Jewish Museum	Anchorage	Anchorage	Southcentral	Religious	Alaska Jewish Culture
Alaska Museum of Science and Nature	Anchorage	Anchorage	Southcentral	Natural history	Website, dinosaur skeletons, fossils, rocks, geology, wildlife
Alaska Native Heritage Center	Anchorage	Anchorage	Southcentral	Alaskan Native	Showcases the indigenous culture of the Alaska Natives, including tools, watercraft, clothing, art, drums and more
Alaska SeaLife Center	Seward	Kenai Peninsula	Southcentral	Aquarium	https://www.alaskasealife.org/
Alaska State Museum	Juneau	Juneau	Southeast	Multiple	Alaska Natives, history, natural history & art
Alaska State Troopers Museum	Anchorage	Anchorage	Southcentral	Law enforcement	Commemorates Alaska State Troopers & features a variety of historical memorabilia, including a restored 1952 Hudson Hornet patrol car.
Alaska Veterans Museum	Anchorage	Anchorage	Southcentral	Alaska's Military History	Commemorates Alaska's Military History, Honor our veterans, educate our visitors. Features large collection of Oral Histories, Exhibits on The Forgotten War, Eskimo Scouts (ATG), Muktuk Marston, The Last Shot, Cold War, Nike Site, Vietnam, Korean War, Modern Conflicts. Website
Alfred Starr Cultural Center and Museum	Nenana	Yukon-Koyukuk	Interior	Alaskan Native	Website
Alutiiq Museum	Kodiak	Kodiak Island	Southwest	Alaskan Native	Koniag Alutiiq heritage and culture
American Bald Eagle Foundation Museum	Haines	Haines	Southeast	Natural history	Website, natural history of bald eagles and other animals in its environment
Anchorage Alaska Center	Anchorage	Anchorage	Southcentral	Multiple	Visitor center, exhibits on natural, historical, and cultural features throughout the state
Anchorage Museum at Rasmuson Center	Anchorage	Anchorage	Southcentral	Multiple	Art, history & culture of Alaska; largest museum in Alaska.
Anvik Historical Society and Museum	Anvik	Yukon-Koyukuk	Interior	Local history	
Baranov Museum	Kodiak	Kodiak Island	Southwest	Local history	Operated by the Kodiak Historical Society
Big Delta State Historical Park	Big Delta	Southeast Fairbanks	Interior	Local history	Includes historic roadhouse, museum of local history artifacts
Carrie M. McLain Memorial Museum	Nome	Nome	Arctic Alaska	Local history	Website
Clausen Memorial Museum	Petersburg	Petersburg	Southeast	Local history	Website, exhibits include fishing, merchants, businesses, Tlingit
Cordova Museum	Cordova	Unorganized	Southcentral	Local history	Website, operated by the Cordova Historical Society
Dorothy Page Museum	Wasilla	Matanuska-Susitna	Southcentral	Local history	City history
Duncan Cottage Museum	Metlakatla	Unorganized	Southeast	Historic house	Facebook site
Eagle Historical Society & Museums	Eagle	Southeast Fairbanks	Interior	Local history	Website
Elmendorf Wildlife Museum	Anchorage	Anchorage	Southcentral	Natural history	Small museum located at Elmendorf Air Force Base, Information, look for listing
Fairbanks Community Museum	Fairbanks	Fairbanks North Star	Interior	Local history	Located in the former city hall
Fairbanks Ice Museum	Fairbanks	Fairbanks North Star	Interior	Art	Ice sculptures
Fort Egbert	Eagle	Southeast Fairbanks	Interior	Military	Early 20th-century Army base buildings
Gold Dredge 8	Fairbanks	Fairbanks North Star	Interior	Mining	Includes Tanana Valley Railroad ride to historic gold panning dredge
Hammer Museum	Haines	Haines	Southeast	Technology	Features over 1,700 hammers and related tools, ranging from an ancient Roman battle axe to modern novelty hammers
Hope & Sunrise Historical and Mining Museum	Hope	Kenai Peninsula	Southcentral	Local history	Website
Ilanka Cultural Center	Cordova	Unorganized	Southcentral	Alaskan Native	Website
Inupiat Heritage Center	Utqiaġvik	North Slope	Arctic Alaska	Alaskan Native	Recognizes contributions of Alaska Natives to the history of whaling. Contains exhibits, artifact collections, library & room where traditional crafts are demonstrated & taught.
Juneau-Douglas City Museum	Juneau	Juneau	Southeast	Local history	Exhibits include gold mining, hydropower, skiing, outdoor recreation, fishing, politics and city history
Kenai Visitors & Cultural Center	Kenai	Kenai Peninsula	Southcentral	Multiple	Website, operated by Arts Kenai, Alaskan Native, natural history, history, art
Klondike Gold Rush National Historical Park	Skagway	Skagway	Southeast	Military	Includes Mascot Saloon museum, historic Moore House
Knik Museum	Wasilla	Matanuska-Susitna	Southcentral	Local history	Operated by the Wasilla-Knik Historical Society
Kodiak Maritime Museum	Kodiak	Kodiak Island	Southwest	Maritime	Website, located in Fort Abercrombie State Historical Park
Kodiak Military History Museum	Kodiak	Kodiak Island	Southwest	Military	WWII-era bunker and artifacts, history of Fort Abercrombie
Last Chance Mining Museum	Juneau	Juneau	Southeast	Mining	Former gold mining camp
Maxine & Jesse Whitney Museum	Valdez	Unorganized	Southcentral	Multiple	Natural history, Alaskan Native artifacts, formerly the Alaska Cultural Center, operated by Prince William Sound College
Mendenhall Glacier Visitor Center	Juneau	Juneau	Southeast	Natural history	Exhibits about the Mendenhall Glacier
Morris Thompson Cultural & Visitors Center	Fairbanks	Fairbanks North Star	Interior	Multiple	Website, Alaskan Native culture, history and natural history of Interior Alaska
Museum of Alaska Transportation & Industry	Wasilla	Matanuska-Susitna	Southcentral	Multiple	Website, transportation & industrial artifacts
Museum of the Aleutians	Unalaska	Aleutians West	Southwest	Local history	Website, local history and culture
Museum of the North	Fairbanks	Fairbanks North Star	Interior	Multiple	Part of University of Alaska, art, history, culture, natural history
Northwest Arctic Heritage Center	Kotzebue	Northwest Arctic	Arctic Alaska	Multiple	Natural and cultural history of the Western Arctic National Parklands
Oscar Anderson House Museum	Anchorage	Anchorage	Southcentral	Historic house	Built in 1915 by early Anchorage resident Oscar Anderson & became the first wood-frame house in Anchorage. Completely restored to 1915 appearance.
Palmer Museum of History & Art	Palmer	Matanuska-Susitna	Southcentral	Multiple	website, local history, culture, art
Pedro Gold Dredge	Chicken	Southeast Fairbanks	Interior	Mining	Historic mining dredge at Chicken Gold Camp & Outpost
Pioneer Aviation Museum	Fairbanks	Fairbanks North Star	Interior	Aviation	website, history of interior and arctic Alaskan aviation, located in Pioneer Park
Pioneer Park	Fairbanks	Fairbanks North Star	Interior	Multiple	44-acre park, includes the Alaska Native Museum, Pioneer Museum, early 20th-century Kitty Hensley House, Tanana Valley Railroad Museum, SS Nenana, Wickersham House
Pratt Museum	Homer	Kenai Peninsula	Southcentral	Natural history	Local history, natural history, art, culture
Prince William Sound Museum	Whittier	Unorganized	Southcentral	Multiple	Website, WWII and Cold War military history of Alaska, 1964 earthquake
Seward Community Library & Museum	Seward	Kenai Peninsula	Southcentral	Local history	website
Sheldon Museum and Cultural Center	Haines	Haines	Southeast	Multiple	Website, history, art and blending of diverse cultures within the Chilkat Valley region
Sheldon Jackson Museum	Sitka	Sitka	Southeast	Alaskan Native	Alaskan Native artifacts
Simon Paneak Memorial Museum	Anaktuvuk Pass	North Slope	Arctic Alaska	Alaskan Native	website, history and culture of the Nunamiut Inupiat
Sitka Historical Museum	Sitka	Sitka	Southeast	Local history	Formerly the Isabel Miller Museum, focuses on Sitka's history from the Tlingit people, through the European explorations & Russian era & after.
Sitka National Historical Park	Sitka	Sitka	Southeast	Multiple	Includes Tlingit ethnographic items, Tlingit & Haida totem poles, Russian American historical & archaeological collections, 1843 period Russian Bishop's House
Skagway Museum and Archives	Skagway	Skagway	Southeast	Local history	
Southeast Alaska Discovery Center	Ketchikan	Ketchikan Gateway	Southeast	Natural history	Visitor center for the Tongass National Forest, ecology, economy and culture of Southeast Alaska and its temperate rainforest ecosystems
Sullivan Roadhouse Historical Museum	Delta Junction	Southeast Fairbanks	Interior	History	Early 20th-century roadhouse with period exhibits, photos
Talkeetna Historical Society Museum	Talkeetna	Matanuska-Susitna	Southcentral	Local history	Website
Tongass Historical Museum	Ketchikan	Ketchikan Gateway	Southeast	History	Website
Totem Heritage Center	Ketchikan	Ketchikan Gateway	Southeast	Alaskan Native	Traditional arts and crafts of the Tlingit, Haida, and Tsimshian cultures
Trapper Creek Museum	Trapper Creek	Matanuska-Susitna	Southcentral	Local history	Website
Valdez Museum	Valdez	Unorganized	Southcentral	Local history	Website
Wrangell Museum	Wrangell	Wrangell	Southeast	Local history	Website
Yupiit Piciryarait Cultural Center	Bethel	Bethel	Southwest	Alaskan Native	Local history of Yup’ik and Alaskan Athabaskan

== Defunct Museums ==
- Russian Orthodox Museum, Anchorage, closed in 2009
- Alaska Heritage Museum by Wells Fargo, Anchorage

== See also ==
- Aquaria in Alaska
- Botanical gardens in Alaska
- Historic landmarks in Alaska
- List of historical societies in Alaska
- Houses in Alaska
- Forts in Alaska
- Museum list
- Nature Centers in Alaska
- Observatories in Alaska
- Registered Historic Places in Alaska
