= Mary Peterson (midwife) =

Alaska Native midwife (1927–2020)

- Born: September 19, 1927 (age 98); Akhiok, Alaska
- Died: December 5, 2020 (aged 93); Akhiok, Alaska
- Citizenship: Native Village of Akhiok and United States
- Occupations: midwife, traditionalist
- Years active: mid to late 20th century
- Known for: Healing, sustaining Alutiiq culture

Mary Peterson (September 18, 1927 – December 5, 2020) was an Alutiiq midwife and healer in the Native Village of Akhiok who was known for her integration of Alutiiq Indigenous and Russian Orthodox traditions into her practice.

== Early life ==
Mary Peterson was born on September 18, 1927, in Akhiok, Kodiak Island, Alaska. As a young girl, Peterson picked berries, fished, and gained knowledge of ancestral traditions of the region such as basket weaving and drying and smoking fish.

== Career and culture ==
Peterson was apprenticed within an Alutiiq tradition under the teaching of local midwives including Irene Agnot. She was elected as the midwife of Akhiok after delivering 25 babies in the region.

Peterson has described her cultural affiliation with the Alutiiq people simply as "Aleut", a name given to the Indigenous community by the first Russian traders to Kodiak in the 18th century. Since 1970, the Aleut culture has been officially renamed as "Alutiiq", replacing its other terms such as Sugpiaq Eskimo, Pacific Eskimo, or Koniag. As Mulchay writes in her biography of Peterson, which explores her life as well as the complexity and situational fluidity of her ethnic identity: "Kodiak Alutiiqs may identify to varying degrees with the Russian, Swedish, or other European components of their heritage, welcoming rather than explaining away that ancestry." The complexities of Alutiiq cultural life after 18th- and 19th-century Russian colonization are illustrated in an account of how Peterson commonly sang "Orthodox Christmas songs in Alutiiq and Slavonic".

Peterson integrated traditional Alutiiq practices such as "keeping mothers warm and relaxed" with contemporary community nursing approaches. In Alaskan Alutiiq culture, midwives are also recognized as healers who are connected to the spiritual realm. As with Athabascans and other Alaskan Indigenous communities, birth is viewed as transcending the boundaries of human society, requiring the ceremonial attendance of a midwife who has an intimate understanding of the land and the teachings of its elders – guarded knowledges which define her expertise as a healer. Like many midwives of her time, Peterson worked within this tradition while also observing Russian Orthodoxy.

== Death and legacy ==
Mary Peterson died at the age of 93 on December 5, 2020, at the Chiniak Bay Elder House of Kodiak, Alaska. Her obituary states, "She has many grand children and great-grandchildren, too numerous to list, but loved by her equally." A biographical book about Peterson's life and legacy, Birth and Rebirth on an Alaskan Island: The Life of an Alutiiq Healer by Joann B. Mulcahy, was published in 2001 by University of Georgia Press.
