= Native Village of Akhiok =

Federally recognized Alaska Native tribe

Native Village of Akhiok Kasukuak (Alutiiq)
- Alaska Native village
- Location within Alaska
- Coordinates: 56°56′38″N 154°12′39″W
- Capital: Akhiok, Alaska

Government
  - Type: Representative democracy
  - Body: Akhiok Tribal Council
  - President: Donene Amodo

Population (2005)
  - Estimate: 100
- Demonym: Akhiok Alutiiq
- Time zone: UTC–09:00 (AKST)
  - Summer (DST): UTC–08:00 (AKDT)

The Native Village of Akhiok is a federally recognized Alaska Native tribe of Alutiiq people. This Alaska Native tribe is headquartered in Akhiok, Alaska, as is Kaguyak Village.

== Government ==
The Native Village of Akhiok is led by a democratically elected tribal council. Its president is Donene Amodo. The Alaska Regional Office of the Bureau of Indian Affairs serves the tribe. As of 2005, the tribe had 100 enrolled citizens.

The Native Village of Akhiok is a member of the National Congress of American Indians.

== Territory ==
Historically from Humpy Cove, the community moved to Akhiok in 1881. Akhiok is in the southern coast of Kodiak Island near the Shelikof Strait. The land is part of the Kodiak Island Borough.

== Economy ==
The tribe is affiliated with Koniag, Incorporated, an Alaska Native corporation.

== Language and culture ==
The Native Village of Akhiok speaks English and the Alutiiq language.

== Climate change ==
Alaska Natives are already feeling the effects of climate change from increased fires, harsher storms, melting permafrost, erosion along the coasts, and weather patterns shifting. To address these threats, in 2006, 162 Alaska Native tribes, including the Native Village of Akhiok, and corporations working with the Native American Rights Fund, signed a Climate Change resolution calling upon Congress to pass laws to reduce greenhouse gas emissions.

== Notable tribal citizens ==
- Mary Peterson (1927–2020), midwife and traditionalist

== See also ==
- List of Alaska Native tribal entities
