= Tina Marie Woods =

Tina Marie Woods is an American psychologist and Alaska Native community advocate.

== Early life and education ==
Woods is the daughter of the late Maria Shaishnikoff and the late Juan Duenas Leon-Guerrero. Woods is half Aleut, originally from St. Paul, Alaska, and half Chamorro from the Island of Guam.

Woods dropped out of high school in the 10th grade, but went on to graduate from Bartlett High School in Anchorage, Alaska in 1993. In 1999 she graduated from University of Alaska Anchorage with her Bachelors in Psychology primarily focusing on Alaska Native people and Alaska Native youth In 2005 she completed Executive Leadership training through Indian Health Services. In 2007 Woods began her training for her Ph.D. and completed it in 2013, in Clinical Community Psychology with Rural Indigenous Emphasis.

== Career ==
A licensed clinical psychologist in Alaska, Woods has been the wellness program director and administrator for the Aleutian Pribilof Islands Association for over fifteen years, supporting the Aleut people of the Aleutians and Pribilof Islands. She is involved in the Alaska Juvenile Justice Advisory Committee, appointed by the Governor in 2002. She served as an alternate member of the Substance Abuse and Mental Health Services Administration tribal advisory committee on behalf of Alaska. With training from Tlingit teachers, Harold and Phil Gatensby of Carcross, Canada she was able to conduct peacemaking or healing circles. She was invited in 2007 to use these healing circles at Camp Coho, a day camp sponsored by the Alaska Native Tribal Health Council for Alaska Native children who have lost a loved one to cancer. Also in 2007, she served as the Alaska Natives into Psychology Coordinator on the University of Alaska Anchorage campus, encouraging Native students to pursue psychology and other behavioral health programs. She serves on the Data Safety Monitoring board for the HEALTHH Study (Healing and Empowering Alaskan Lives Toward Healthy Hearts Project). She is also a member of the University of Alaska Anchorage Psychology Department Community Advisory Board, the Alaska Public Health Association, the Alaska Psychological Association, and the American Psychological Association. Woods is a committee member of the Criminal Justice Commission workshop on Behavioral Health and for the Alaska Opioid Policy Task Force. She was co-chair for the writing of the 1115 Behavioral Health Waiver Demonstration Project, which allows patients greater access to behavioral health treatment. She has served the Alaskan Tribal Health System for over fifteen years and currently serves as the Alaska Native Tribal Health Consortium's Senior Director of Community Health Services.

== Personal life ==
Woods is married to Daniel Wood, an Athabascan from Rampart, Alaska. They share a daughter, Jasmine Nicole Woods. Woods resides currently in Anchorage, Alaska where she presides as the Senior Director of Community Health Services for Alaska Native Tribal Health Consortium.

== See also ==
- List of Alaska Native inventors and scientists
