= Kaguyak Village =

Alaska Native village

- People: Alutiiq
- Headquarters: Akhiok, Alaska, US

Government
- Chief: Phyllis Amodo

Tribal Council
- Kaguyak Tribal Council

The Kaguyak Village is a federally recognized Alutiiq Alaska Native tribal entity.

== About ==
Kaguyak Village is headquartered in the city of Akhiok in the Kodiak Island Borough of Alaska. As of 2005, the tribe had 9 enrolled citizens.

== History ==
In the 21st century, the remains of five Native American bodies have been repatriated to Kaguyak Village; three from Oregon State University and one each from the Anchorage Museum at Rasmuson Center, the Field Museum, and Michigan State University. Five remains of interest to Kayugak Village have not been repatriated; two at Harvard University and three at the Alaska Office of History and Archeology.

== See also ==
- List of Alaska Native tribal entities
- Native Village of Akhiok, another Alutiiq tribe headquartered in Akhiok, Alaska
- Kaguyak Village site, abandoned precontact Alutiiq village
