= Chiniak, Alaska =

Chiniak Cing’iyak
- Census-designated place
- Location in Alaska
- Coordinates: 57°36′38″N 152°11′59″W
- Country: United States
- State: Alaska
- Borough: Kodiak Island

Government
  - Borough mayor: Jerrol Friend
  - State senator: Gary Stevens (R)
  - State rep.: Louise Stutes (R)

Area
  - Total: 38.80 sq mi (100.48 km^{2})
  - Land: 38.73 sq mi (100.30 km^{2})
  - Water: 0.069 sq mi (0.18 km^{2})
- Elevation: 0 ft (0 m)

Population (2020)
  - Total: 61
  - Density: 1.6/sq mi (0.61/km^{2})
- Time zone: UTC-9 (Alaska (AKST))
  - Summer (DST): UTC-8 (AKDT)
- Area code: 907
- FIPS code: 02-13860
- GNIS feature ID: 2418827

Chiniak (Cing’iyak in Alutiiq) is a census-designated place (CDP) in Kodiak Island Borough, Alaska, United States. As of the 2020 census, Chiniak had a population of 61.

== Geography ==
Chiniak is located at 57°36′38″N 152°11′59″W (57.610603, -152.199817).

According to the United States Census Bureau, the CDP has a total area of 38.8 square miles (100.4 km^{2}), of which 38.7 square miles (100.2 km^{2}) is land and 0.077 square miles (0.2 km^{2}), or 0.18%, is water.

=== Climate ===
Climate data for Chiniak, Alaska
Month	Jan	Feb	Mar	Apr	May	Jun	Jul	Aug	Sep	Oct	Nov	Dec	Year
Record high °F (°C)	43 (6)	49 (9)	55 (13)	63 (17)	77 (25)	85 (29)	80 (27)	86 (30)	73 (23)	62 (17)	51 (11)	43 (6)	86 (30)
Mean daily maximum °F (°C)	34.3 (1.3)	35.2 (1.8)	40.2 (4.6)	45.0 (7.2)	54.0 (12.2)	59.6 (15.3)	62.7 (17.1)	65.0 (18.3)	57.7 (14.3)	47.1 (8.4)	39.1 (3.9)	34.9 (1.6)	47.9 (8.8)
Daily mean °F (°C)	30.5 (−0.8)	30.4 (−0.9)	33.8 (1.0)	39.0 (3.9)	45.8 (7.7)	51.6 (10.9)	55.3 (12.9)	56.7 (13.7)	50.7 (10.4)	40.9 (4.9)	34.5 (1.4)	30.0 (−1.1)	41.6 (5.3)
Mean daily minimum °F (°C)	26.6 (−3.0)	25.6 (−3.6)	27.4 (−2.6)	33.0 (0.6)	37.6 (3.1)	43.6 (6.4)	47.9 (8.8)	48.3 (9.1)	43.6 (6.4)	34.7 (1.5)	29.8 (−1.2)	25.0 (−3.9)	35.3 (1.8)
Record low °F (°C)	3 (−16)	4 (−16)	−2 (−19)	18 (−8)	24 (−4)	32 (0)	35 (2)	35 (2)	26 (−3)	20 (−7)	13 (−11)	2 (−17)	−2 (−19)
Average precipitation inches (mm)	8.18 (208)	6.36 (162)	6.98 (177)	7.21 (183)	6.92 (176)	5.06 (129)	6.07 (154)	5.09 (129)	11.81 (300)	10.08 (256)	8.20 (208)	10.81 (275)	92.77 (2,357)
Average snowfall inches (cm)	6.7 (17)	4.7 (12)	4.3 (11)	1.1 (2.8)	0.1 (0.25)	0.0 (0.0)	0.0 (0.0)	0.0 (0.0)	0.0 (0.0)	0.2 (0.51)	1.3 (3.3)	11.7 (30)	30.1 (76.86)
Source: WRCC

== Demographics ==
Historical population
Census	Pop.	Note	%±
1880	24		—
1990	69		—
2000	50		−27.5%
2010	47		−6.0%
2020	61		29.8%
U.S. Decennial Census

Chiniak first appeared on the 1880 U.S. Census as an unincorporated Inuit Village of 24 persons (all Inuit). It was likely abandoned some point soon after, as it did not appear on the 1890 census or until 100 years later in 1990, after the area was resettled by non-natives and made a census-designated place.

As of the census of 2000, there were 50 people, 24 households, and 13 families residing in the CDP. The population density was 1.2 inhabitants per square mile (0.46/km^{2}). There were 32 housing units at an average density of 0.8 per square mile (0.31/km^{2}). The racial makeup of the CDP was 88.00% White, 2.00% Native American, 2.00% Asian, 6.00% from other races, and 2.00% from two or more races. 8.00% of the population were Hispanic or Latino of any race.

There were 24 households, out of which 25.0% had children under the age of 18 living with them, 45.8% were married couples living together, and 41.7% were non-families. 37.5% of all households were made up of individuals, and 8.3% had someone living alone who was 65 years of age or older. The average household size was 2.08 and the average family size was 2.71.

In the CDP, the population was spread out, with 18.0% under the age of 18, 6.0% from 18 to 24, 14.0% from 25 to 44, 56.0% from 45 to 64, and 6.0% who were 65 years of age or older. The median age was 49 years. For every 100 females, there were 194.1 males. For every 100 females age 18 and over, there were 173.3 males.

The median income for a household in the CDP was $14,167, and the median income for a family was $75,067. Males had a median income of $51,250 versus $0 for females. The per capita income for the CDP was $22,211. There were no families and 20.0% of the population living below the poverty line, including no under eighteens and none of those over 64.

== Community ==
Electricity, telephones, running water are available, as well as a paved highway most of the way to the village. The town has a school, post office, and library. The Chiniak Post Office is home to Chiniak Art Works, a non profit under the umbrella of the Kodiak Arts Council.

The Chiniak School, a K-12 rural school, is operated by the Kodiak Island Borough School District. Elaine Griffin, a kindergarten through 10th grade teacher at Chiniak School, received the 1995 Milken Educator Award for National Teacher of the Year.

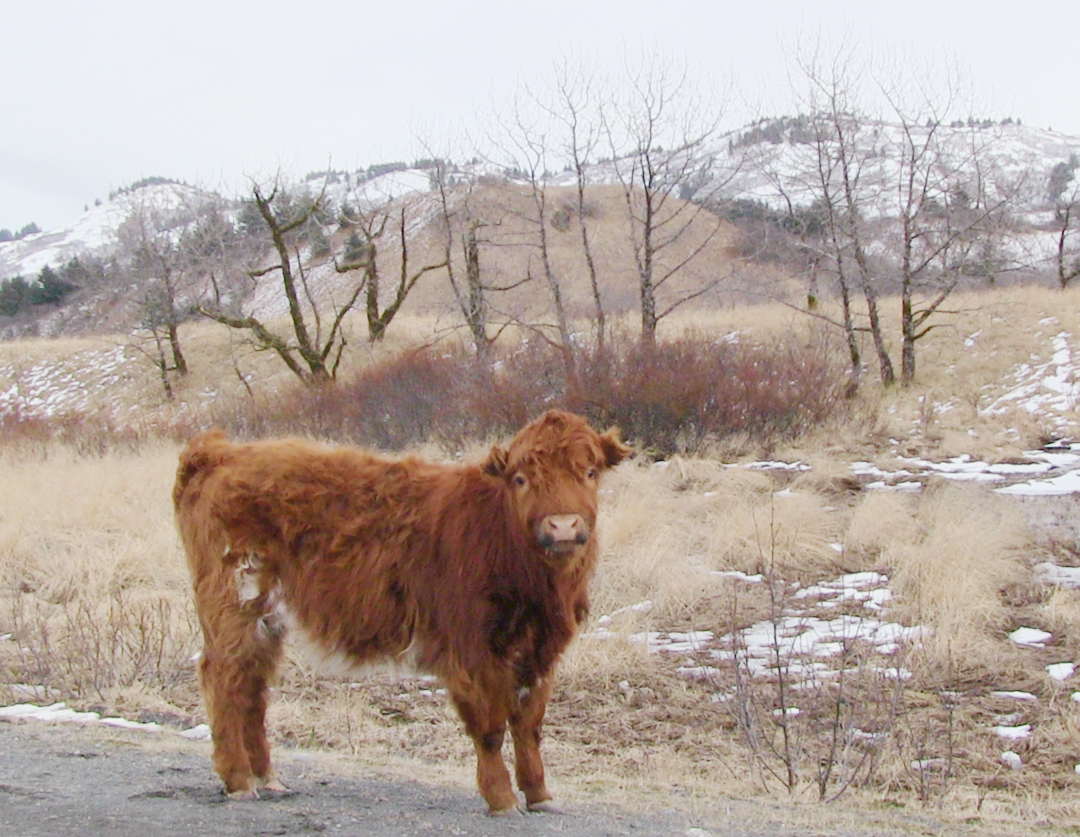
On the road to Chiniak, winter

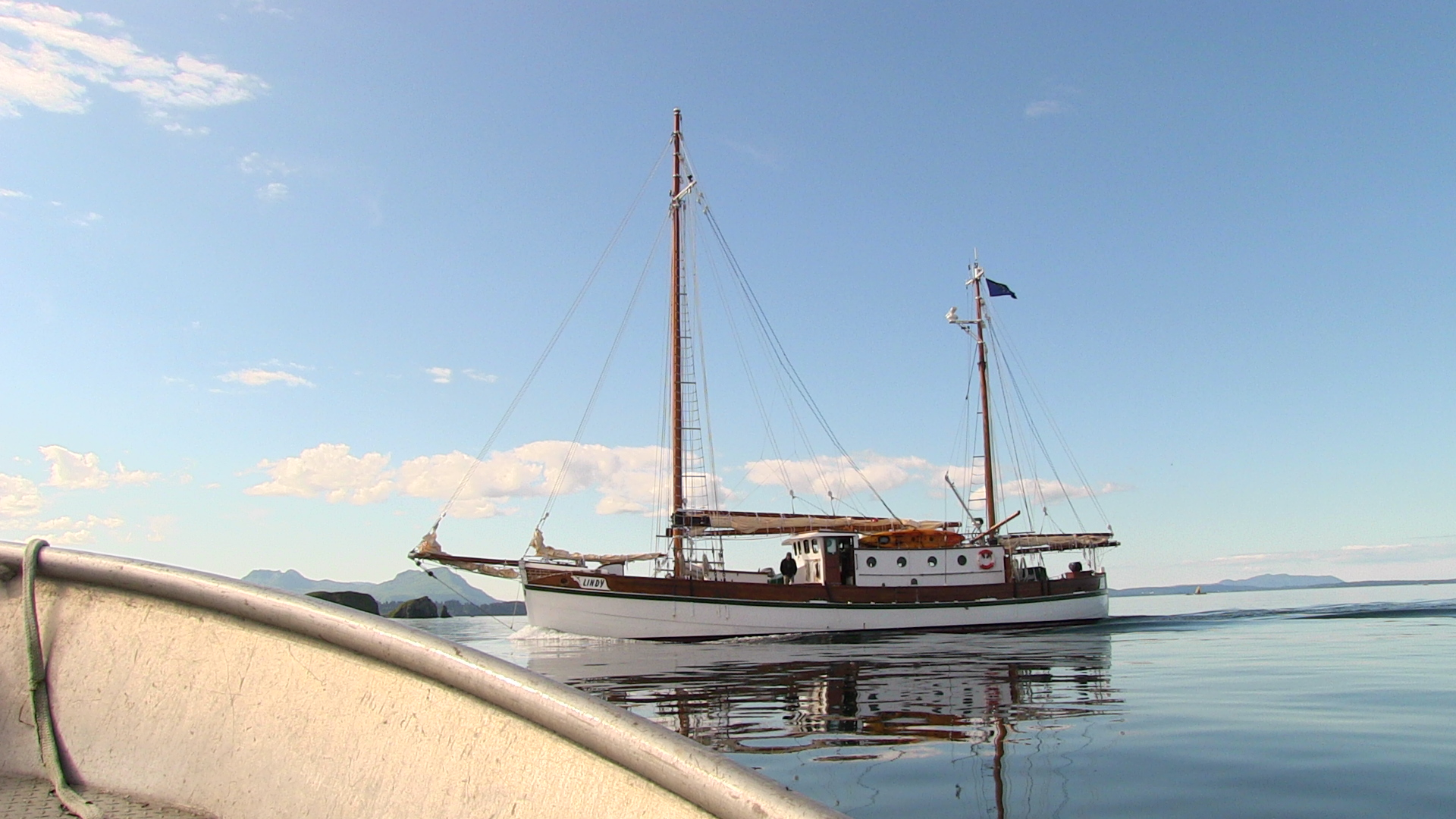
Journey to the Aleutian Chain passes through Chiniak

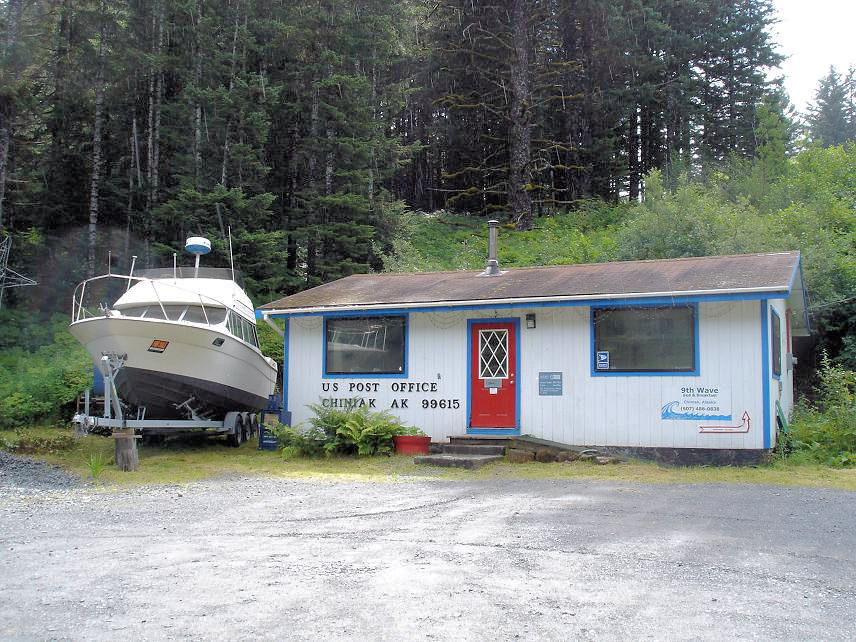
Chiniak's post office

== See also ==
- List of census-designated places in Alaska
