= Akhiok, Alaska =

City in Alaska, United States

Akhiok, Alaska Kasukuak (Alutiiq)
- City
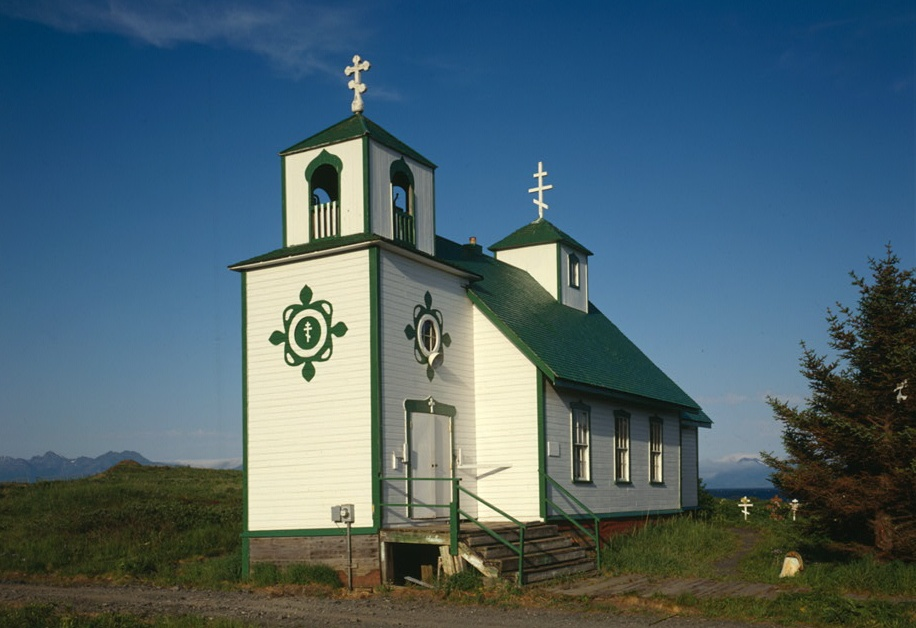
- Protection of the Theotokos Chapel (1990)

- Location within Alaska Location within the United States
- Coordinates: 56°56′44″N 154°10′25″W
- Country: United States
- State: Alaska
- Borough: Kodiak Island
- Incorporated: November 20, 1972

Government
  - Mayor: Dan McCoy
  - State senator: Gary Stevens (R)
  - State rep.: Louise Stutes (R)

Area
  - Total: 9.61 sq mi (24.89 km^{2})
  - Land: 7.40 sq mi (19.17 km^{2})
  - Water: 2.21 sq mi (5.72 km^{2})
- Elevation: 30 ft (9 m)

Population (2020)
  - Total: 63
  - Density: 8.5/sq mi (3.29/km^{2})
- Time zone: UTC-9 (Alaska (AKST))
  - Summer (DST): UTC-8 (AKDT)
- ZIP code: 99615
- Area code: 907
- FIPS code: 02-00650
- GNIS feature ID: 1398007

Akhiok (Russian: Акхиок, romanized: Akxiok; Alutiiq: Kasukuak) is a second-class city in Kodiak Island Borough, Alaska, United States. As of 2020 census, its population was 63. Akhiok is Kodiak's southernmost village and is accessible only by air and water.

Akhiok is the headquarters of the Native Village of Akhiok and Kaguyak Village, both federally recognized Alaska Native tribes of Alutiiq people.

== History ==
Akhiok is an Alutiiq village dependent upon fishing and subsistence activities. The original village of Kashukugniut was occupied by Russians in the early 19th century. The community was originally a sea otter hunting settlement, located at Humpy Cove. The name Akhiok was reported in the 1880 census. In 1881, residents relocated to the present site at Alitak Bay. The relocation was, in part, based on the switch to a fishing economy. Most families gain their livelihood from fishing, either directly by fishing for salmon and halibut or by working in a nearby cannery.

The community's Russian Orthodox church, Protection of the Theotokos Chapel, was built around 1900 at the site of an earlier structure.

A post office was established in 1933. Akhiok, which does have a post office, is a rural location in postal code 99615 that belongs to Kodiak. The village is sometimes called Alitak, after a nearby bay.

Residents of nearby Kaguyak relocated to Akhiok after the 1964 earthquake and tsunami destroyed their village. The city was incorporated in 1972.

== Geography ==
Akhiok is located at 56.945560° North, 154.17028° West (Sec. 28, T037S, R031W, Seward Meridian). Akhiok is in the Kodiak Recording District, and the 3rd Judicial District.

According to the United States Census Bureau, the city has a total area of 10.2 square miles (26.4 km^{2}), of which 7.8 square miles (20.1 km^{2}) is land and 2.4 square miles (6.3 km^{2}), or 23.92%, is water.

Akhiok is located at the southern end of Kodiak Island at Alitak Bay. It lies 80 miles (130 km) southwest of the city of Kodiak, and 340 miles (550 km) southwest of Anchorage.

=== Climate ===
The climate of the Kodiak Islands is dominated by a strong marine influence. There is little or no freezing weather, moderate precipitation, and frequent cloud cover and fog. Severe storms are common from December through February. Annual precipitation is 35 inches (890 mm). Temperatures remain within a narrow range, from 25 to 54 °F (−4 to 12 °C).

== Demographics ==
Historical population
Census	Pop.	Note	%±
1880	114		—
1890	420		268.4%
1910	106		—
1920	94		−11.3%
1930	86		−8.5%
1940	82		−4.7%
1950	72		−12.2%
1960	84		16.7%
1970	115		36.9%
1980	105		−8.7%
1990	77		−26.7%
2000	80		3.9%
2010	71		−11.2%
2020	63		−11.3%
2022 (est.)	65	▲	3.2%
U.S. Decennial Census

Akhiok first appeared on the 1880 U.S. Census as an unincorporated native village, all 114 residents were Native Alaskans. It was returned as Alitak in 1890 (accounting for the dramatic increase in population, it included the village of Akhiok and those working in the cannery at Olga Bay). It did not appear on the 1900 census. It appeared as Akhiok (or alternatively as Achiok) on the 1910 and 1920 census. In 1930, it was returned as "Alltak" (likely an erroneous spelling). In 1940, it reported as Alitak again. From 1950 to date (2010), it has returned as Akhiok, incorporating in 1972.

=== 2020 census ===
As of the 2020 census, Akhiok had a population of 63. The median age was 40.3 years. 28.6% of residents were under the age of 18 and 19.0% of residents were 65 years of age or older. For every 100 females there were 110.0 males, and for every 100 females age 18 and over there were 114.3 males age 18 and over.

0.0% of residents lived in urban areas, while 100.0% lived in rural areas.

There were 30 households in Akhiok, of which 33.3% had children under the age of 18 living in them. Of all households, 30.0% were married-couple households, 23.3% were households with a male householder and no spouse or partner present, and 20.0% were households with a female householder and no spouse or partner present. About 20.0% of all households were made up of individuals and 10.0% had someone living alone who was 65 years of age or older.

There were 36 housing units, of which 16.7% were vacant. The homeowner vacancy rate was 0.0% and the rental vacancy rate was 40.0%.

Racial composition as of the 2020 census
Race	Number	Percent
White	4	6.3%
Black or African American	1	1.6%
American Indian and Alaska Native	55	87.3%
Asian	0	0.0%
Native Hawaiian and Other Pacific Islander	0	0.0%
Some other race	0	0.0%
Two or more races	3	4.8%
Hispanic or Latino (of any race)	0	0.0%

=== 2000 census ===
As of the census of 2000, there were 80 people, 25 households, and 17 families residing in the city. The population density was 10.1 people per square mile (3.9/km^{2}). There were 34 housing units at an average density of 4.3 per square mile (1.7/km^{2}). The racial makeup of the city was 2.50% White, 86.25% Native American, 3.75% Asian, and 7.50% from two or more races. 1.25% of the population were Hispanic or Latino of any race.

There were 25 households, out of which 36.0% had children under the age of 18 living with them, 36.0% were married couples living together, 20.0% had a female householder with no husband present, and 32.0% were non-families. 28.0% of all households were made up of individuals, and 4.0% had someone living alone who was 65 years of age or older. The average household size was 3.20 and the average family size was 3.94.

In the city, the age distribution of the population shows 35.0% under the age of 18, 17.5% from 18 to 24, 26.3% from 25 to 44, 16.3% from 45 to 64, and 5.0% who were 65 years of age or older. The median age was 24 years. For every 100 females, there were 122.2 males. For every 100 females age 18 and over, there were 108.0 males.

The median income for a household in the city was $33,438, and the median income for a family was $37,813. Males had a median income of $25,417 versus $6,250 for females. The per capita income for the city was $8,473. There were 5.3% of families and 9.9% of the population living below the poverty line, including 12.5% of under eighteens and none of those over 64.

== Economy ==
Public sector employment and seasonal work provide cash flow in the community. Five residents hold commercial fishing permits. Almost all of Akhiok's residents depend heavily on subsistence fishing and hunting. Salmon, crab, shrimp, clams, ducks, seal, deer, rabbit and bear are utilized. The community is interested in developing a fish smokery and cold storage facility.

Since January 2003, each Akhiok shareholder received $200,000 from sales of a $36 million trust fund provided in the Exxon Valdez oil spill settlement.

Taxes: Sales: None, Property: 9.25 mills (Borough), Special: 5% Accommodations Tax (Borough); 0.925% Severance Tax (Borough)

== Education ==
There is one school in the community, Akhiok School of the Kodiak Island Borough School District.

== Infrastructure ==
Water is derived from a dam and reservoir on a small stream, is treated and stored. Akhiok provides a piped gravity water and sewer system that serves all 25 homes in the community. A new water source is needed. A new landfill site is under development. Electricity is provided by City of Akhiok.

Local hospitals or health clinics include Akhiok Medical Clinic. Akhiok Medical Clinic is a Primary Health Care Facility. Akhiok is classified as an isolated village. It is found in EMS Region 2G in the Kodiak Region. Emergency Services have coastal and air access. Emergency service is provided by volunteers and a health aide. Auxiliary health care is provided by Akhiok Village Response Team (Clinic); flight to Kodiak or Anchorage.

== Transportation ==
The city is accessible only by air and water. Island Air Service offers regular passenger service. In addition, Regular and charter flights are available from the city of Kodiak. There is a state-owned gravel runway (Akhiok Airport; AKK) 3,320 feet (1,010 m) long by 60 feet (18 m) wide, and a seaplane base at Moser Bay, owned by Columbia Ward Fisheries. Barge services are sporadic. A breakwater and boat launch are available, but the existing dock is a temporary structure.
