= Denise Wallace =

American jeweler and member of the Sugpiaq tribe

- Born: 1957 (age 68–69); Seattle, Washington
- Known for: Jewelry

Denise Wallace (born 1957) is a Native American jeweler and member of the Sugpiaq tribe.

== Early life and education ==
Wallace, of Alutiiq descent (also called Sugpiaq Eskimo) was born in 1957 in Seattle. After high school she spent time in Alaska where her grandmother lived. She studied lapidary work and silversmithing in Seattle, and at age 19 began to study at Institute of American Indian Arts (IAIA) in Santa Fe. She received her AA in fine arts from IAIA in 1981. Wallace lived in Santa Fe for twenty years before moving to the Big Island of Hawaii in 1999.

== Career ==
A notable jeweler, Wallace's work exhibits the "major motif of transformation", with movable components including doors, latches, removable parts and hidden compartments. She has stated that the doors are based on traditional masks which sometimes include a face which opens to reveal another face, and described this motif as "a way to show the transformation of the inner spirit of an animal, person, or object". She creates pieces from gold, silver, fossil ivory, coral and semiprecious stones. Wallace also uses fossilized mammoth and mastodon ivory and walrus tusk in her work. The jewelry sometimes includes depictions of figures dressed with Native American textiles and embroidery. She has been called "among the finest jewelry designers of the twentieth century".

== Personal life ==
Wallace married Samuel Wallace from Virginia, with whom she has two children.

== Exhibitions ==
- Arctic Transformations: The Jewelry of Denise and Samuel Wallace, March 2, 2006 – July 23, 2006. National Museum of the American Indian, New York, New York.
