= Kodiak Island Borough School District =

School district in Alaska, United States

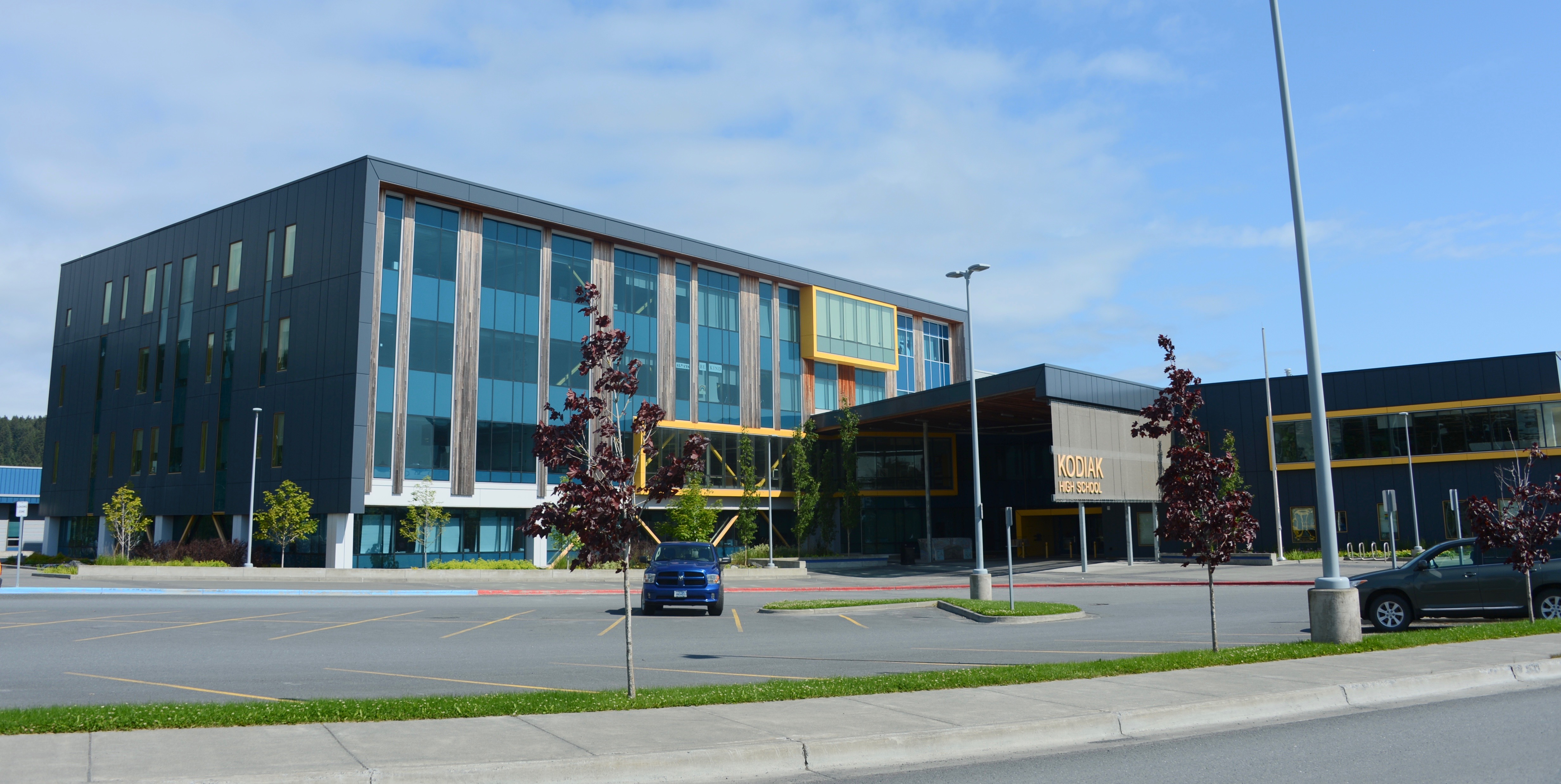
- Kodiak High School

Address
- 722 Mill Bay Road Kodiak, Alaska, 99615; United States

District information
- Type: Public
- Grades: PreK–12
- NCES District ID: 0200480

Students and staff
- Students: 2,122
- Teachers: 149.30
- Staff: 225.66
- Student–teacher ratio: 14.21

Other information
- Website: www.kibsd.org

Kodiak Island Borough School District (KIBSD) is a school district headquartered in Kodiak, Alaska and serving Kodiak Island.

== Schools ==
Kodiak elementary schools:

- East Elementary School
- Main Elementary School
- North Star Elementary School
- Peterson Elementary School

Kodiak secondary schools:

- Kodiak Middle School
- Kodiak High School

Rural schools (all K-12):

- Akhiok School
- Chiniak School
- Karluk School
- Larsen Bay School
- Old Harbor School
- Ouzinkie School
- Port Lions School

Other:

- AKTeach (correspondence school)

== 2025 Consolidation ==
On January 22, 2025, the KIBSD Board of Education voted to consolidate the elementary schools that were part of the district (excluding Peterson), due to a decrease in revenue. Elementary students will now attend the following schools based on grade level:

- East Elementary: K-3
- Main Elementary: 4-5
- Peterson Elementary: K-5
