= Chugach =

Indigenous Alaskan people

Chugach Sugpiaq
- Chugach man in traditional dress

Regions with significant populations
- United States (Alaska): 12,113

Languages
- Alutiiq (Also known as Sugt'stun) (Chugach dialect), English

Related ethnic groups
- Koniag Alutiiq, Yup'ik

Chugach (/ˈtʃuːɡætʃ/ CHEW-gatch), also known as Chugach Sugpiaq or Chugachigmiut, is the name of an Alaska Native people in the region of the Kenai Peninsula and Prince William Sound on the southern coast of Alaska. The Chugach people are an Alutiiq (Pacific Native) people who speak the Chugach dialect of the Alutiiq language.

== Name ==
Their autonym Sugpiaq derives from suk, meaning "person" and -piaq, meaning "real". The term Alutiiq derives from the Russian term for the Aleut people. According to Ethnologue, earlier terms for the Chugach such as Chugach Eskimo, South Alaska Eskimo, Sugpiak Eskimo, and Sugpiaq Eskimo, are pejorative.

== Settlements ==
Chugach villages include Chenega Bay, Eyak, Nanwalek (English Bay), Port Graham, and Tatitlek.

== History ==
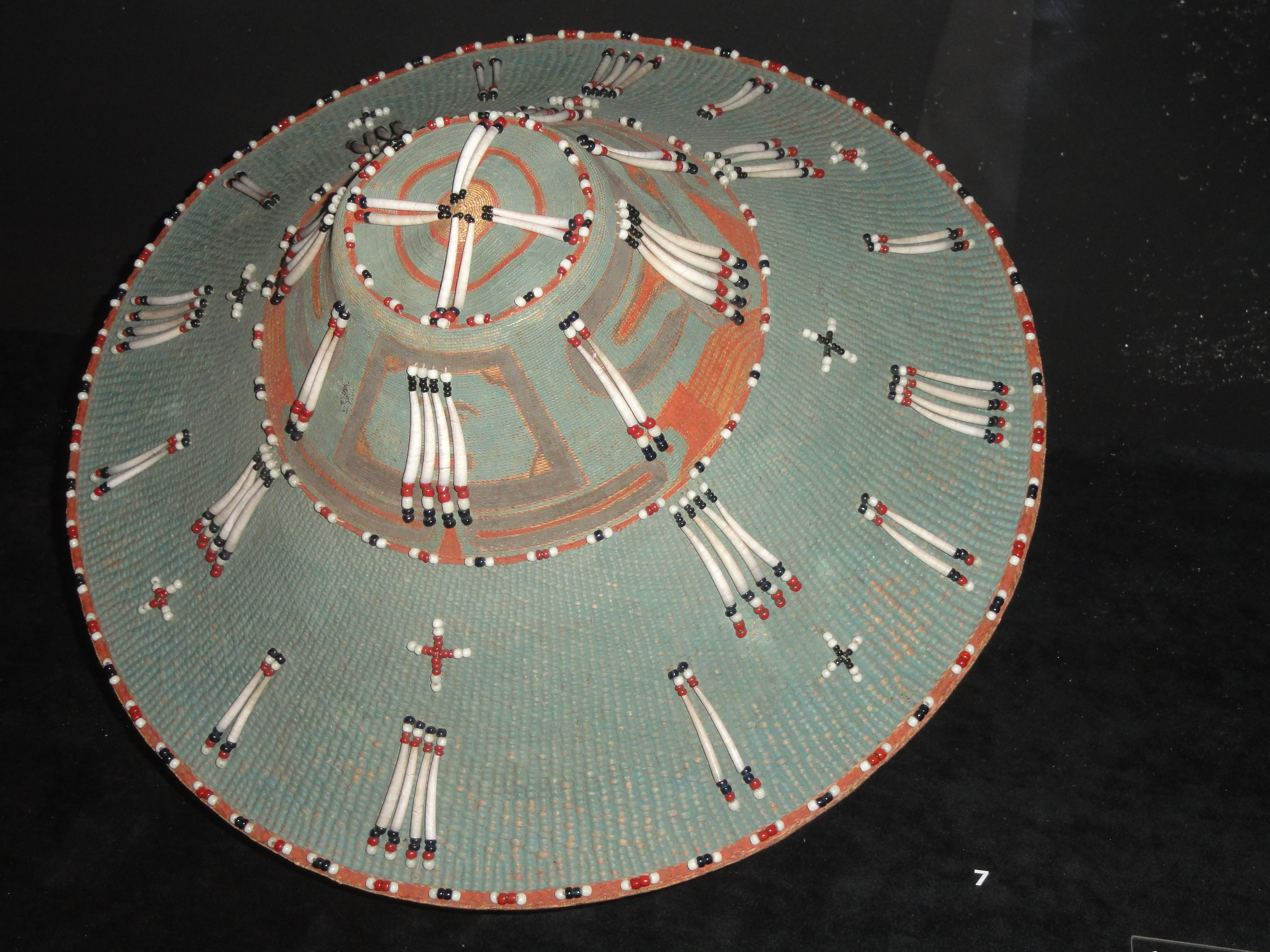
Chugach woven spruce-root hat with dentalium shells and trade beads, Museum of Cultures, Helsinki

The Chugach people have lived in the region around Prince William Sound for millennia, according to archaeological finds. They were the first indigenous Alaskans to encounter the Russian explorer Vitus Bering in 1741. The Russians were followed by Spanish, English, and American explorers. The Chugach have at times traded with or fought against neighboring groups, the Eyak, Ahtna, and the Tlingit.

In 1964, a tsunami generated by the Good Friday earthquake destroyed the Chugach village of Chenega, Alaska. The fishing-based Chugach economy was badly affected by the environmental damage caused by the Exxon Valdez oil spill in 1989.

== Language ==
Chugach people speak one of two dialects of the Pacific Gulf Yupik language; the other being Koniag. These Central Yupik languages belong to the Alaskan Yupik language family. Once written in Cyrillic script, the language is now written in the Latin script.

== Social structures and gender ==
There are historical accounts of some androgynous third gender or two spirit individuals among the Chugach, known as aranu'tiq. According to anthropologists writing in the 1950s, these individuals were considered to be male on one side of their bodies and female on the other. Some had descriptive names like "Tyakutyik" ("What Kind Of People Are These Two?"), but this description was given to many types of people in the community, and was not related to gender expression.

== Namesakes ==
The Chugach people gave their name to Chugach National Forest, the Chugach Mountains, and Alaska's Chugach State Park, all located in or near the traditional range of the Chugach people in southcentral Alaska. Chugach Alaska Corporation, an Alaska Native regional corporation created under the Alaska Native Claims Settlement Act of 1971, also derives its name from the Chugach people, many of whom are shareholders of the corporation.

== See also ==
- Alutiiq Museum
