= Protection of the Theotokos Chapel =

Historic church in Alaska, United States

- U.S. National Register of Historic Places
- Alaska Heritage Resources Survey
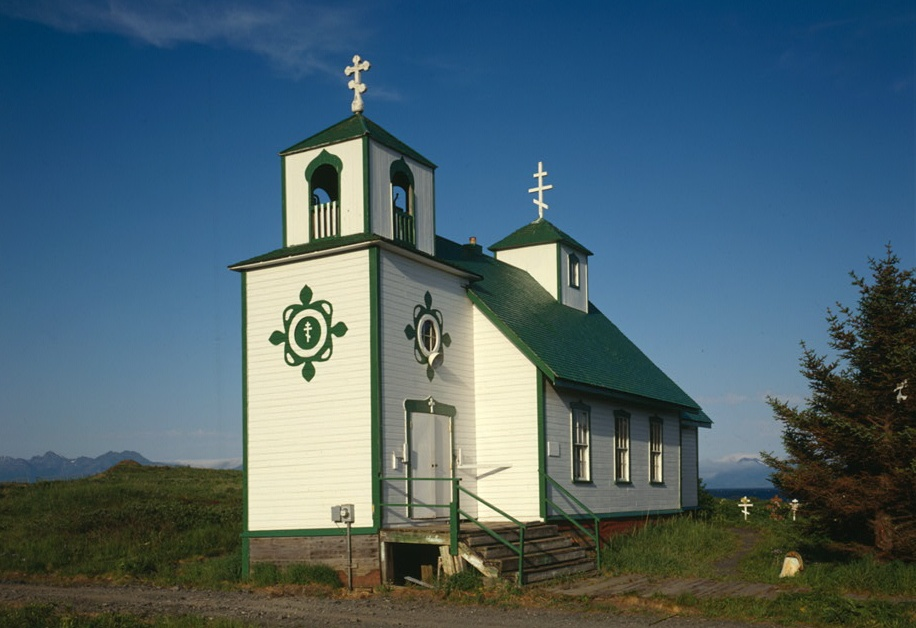
- HABS photograph, 1990

- Location within Alaska
- Location: E Street, Akhiok, Alaska
- Coordinates: 56°56′42″N 154°10′5″W
- Area: less than one acre
- MPS: Russian Orthodox Church Buildings and Sites TR
- NRHP reference No.: 80004590
- AHRS No.: XTI-021

Significant dates
- Added to NRHP: June 6, 1980
- Designated AHRS: May 18, 1973

The Protection of the Theotokos Chapel is a historic Russian Orthodox chapel on Kodiak Island, along E Street in Akhiok, Alaska. It is now under the Diocese of Alaska of the Orthodox Church in America.

The church was built early in the 20th century, exact date not known but soon after 1900. It is not the first church on the site. It has a unique design, one that is simple, but with "details reminiscent of the more ambitious churches built ten to twenty years earlier at Belkofsky and Karluk". It has an approximately 30-by-20-foot (9.1 m × 6.1 m) nave and a 16-by-14-foot (4.9 m × 4.3 m) altar chamber.

It was added to the National Register of Historic Places in 1980. The Ascension of Our Lord Chapel at Karluk and the Holy Resurrection Church at Belkofski were also listed on the National Register on the same date.

== See also ==
- National Register of Historic Places listings in Kodiak Island Borough, Alaska
