= Orville Huntington =

Scientist

- Citizenship: American

Orville Huntington is an American researcher and educator of Native Alaskan Athabaskans descent.

Huntington studies how subsistence lifestyles directly impacts the fish, animals, and plants of Northern ecosystems.

== Background ==
Born in Huslia, Alaska, Huntington received his Bachelor of Science in Wildlife Biology from the University of Alaska, Fairbanks.

Huntington currently works as the Chair of the Interior Athabascan Tribal College, as a Refuge Information Technician at the Koyukuk/Nowitna National Wildlife Refuge, a Vice Chairperson for the Alaska Native Science Committee (since 2000), and the Interior Villages Representative on the board of the Alaska Federation of Natives for the 43 villages in the Doyon area.

Huntington tries to promote Native American traditional ecological knowledge by integrating local and traditional knowledge with western science.

== Research contributions ==
Huntington has been the lead or contributing author on several publications that focus on the relationships between traditional or indigenous knowledge and Western science. The focus of several articles is climate change adaptations and the ways that indigenous expertise and spiritual, ethical practices contribute to an understanding of ecosystems. In addition, his research offers an interdisciplinary perspective that speaks to the intersections of tribal knowledge, spiritual traditions, and wildlife management and regulations.
