= Old Harbor, Alaska =

City in Alaska, United States

Old Harbor, Alaska Nuniaq
- City
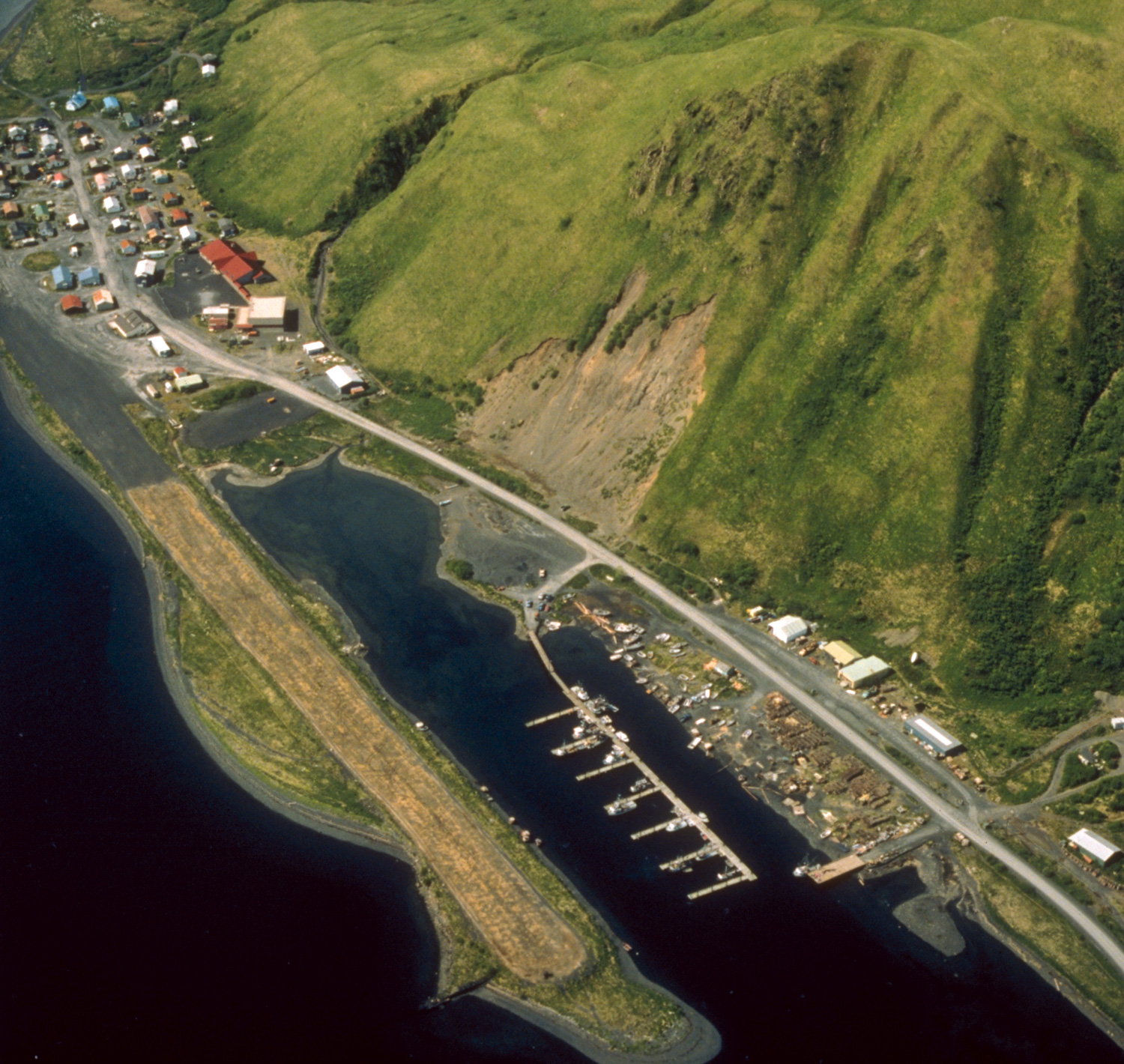
- Aerial view of Old Harbor

- Location in Alaska
- Coordinates: 57°11′50″N 153°18′28″W
- Country: United States
- State: Alaska
- Borough: Kodiak Island
- Incorporated: June 3, 1966

Government
  - Mayor: Jeffrey Peterson (2022)
  - State senator: Gary Stevens (R)
  - State rep.: Louise Stutes (R)

Area
  - Total: 22.59 sq mi (58.50 km^{2})
  - Land: 16.19 sq mi (41.93 km^{2})
  - Water: 6.40 sq mi (16.57 km^{2})
- Elevation: 3.3 ft (1 m)

Population (2020)
  - Total: 216
  - Density: 13.3/sq mi (5.15/km^{2})
- Time zone: UTC-9 (Alaska (AKST))
  - Summer (DST): UTC-8 (AKDT)
- ZIP code: 99643
- Area code: 907
- FIPS code: 02-57340
- GNIS feature ID: 1407483

Old Harbor (Alutiiq: Nuniaq; Russian: Старая Гавань) is a city in Kodiak Island Borough, Alaska, United States. As of the 2020 census, Old Harbor had a population of 216.

The Alutiiq Tribe of Old Harbor, a federally recognized Alaska Native tribe of Koniaq Alutiiq people, is headquartered in Old Harbor, Alaska.

== Geography ==
According to the United States Census Bureau, the city has a total area of 26.5 square miles (68.7 km^{2}), of which 20.5 square miles (53.2 km^{2}) is land and 6.0 square miles (15.5 km^{2}), or 22.59%, is water.

== History ==
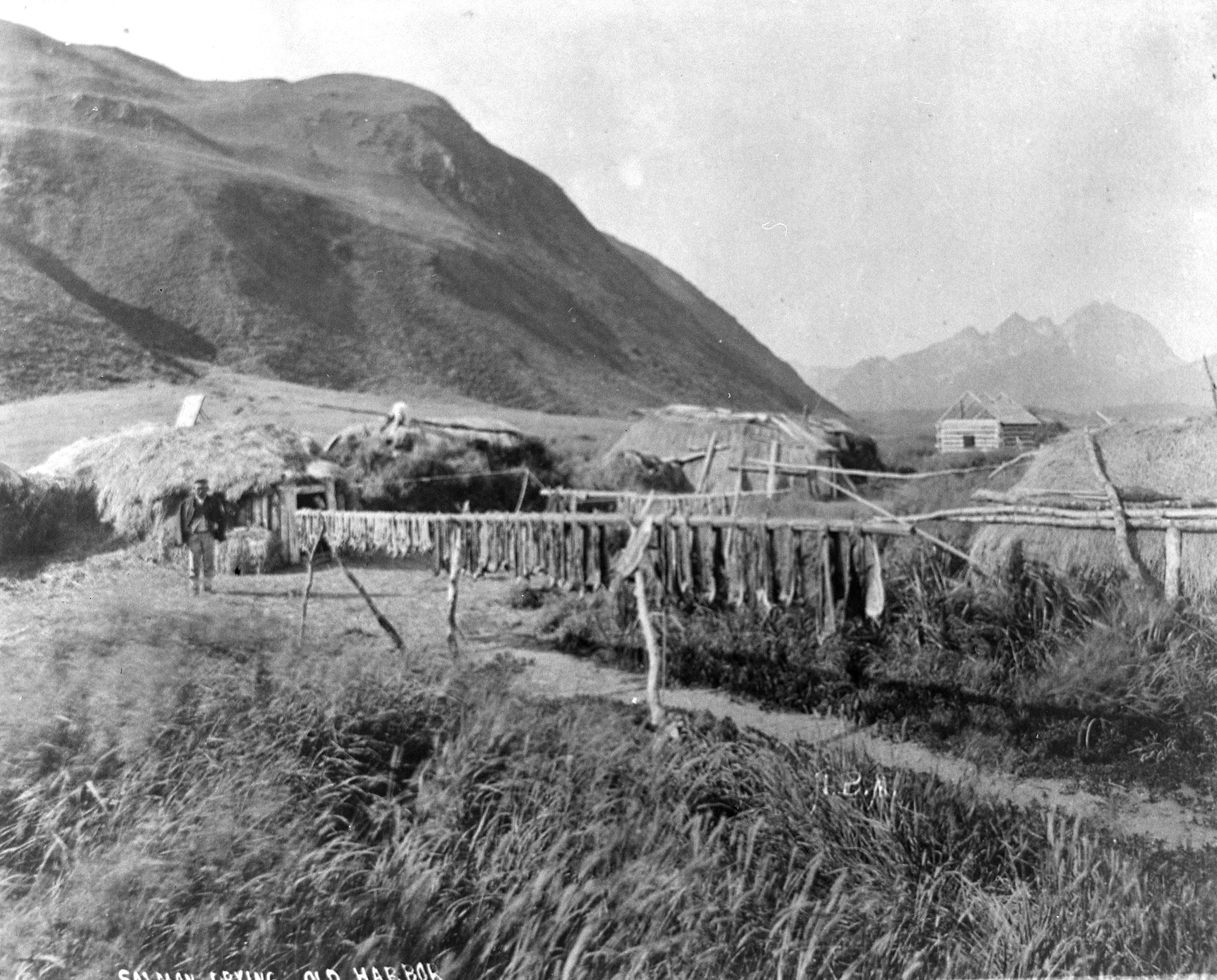
Salmon drying. Alutiiq (Sugpiaq) village, Old Harbor (Nuniaq). Photographed by N. B. Miller, 1889.

The community of Old Harbor has its origins in the era of Russian conquest. On August 14, 1784, Grigory Shelikhov with 130 Russian fur traders massacred (see Awa'uq Massacre) several hundred Qik’rtarmiut Sugpiat tribe of Alutiiq men, women and children at Refuge Rock, a tiny stack island off the eastern coast of Sitkalidak Island. In Alutiiq, this sacred place is known as Awa'uq ("to become numb").

== Demographics ==
Historical population
Census	Pop.	Note	%±
1880	160		—
1890	86		−46.2%
1920	54		—
1930	84		55.6%
1940	109		29.8%
1950	121		11.0%
1960	193		59.5%
1970	290		50.3%
1980	340		17.2%
1990	284		−16.5%
2000	237		−16.5%
2010	218		−8.0%
2020	216		−0.9%
U.S. Decennial Census

Old Harbor first appeared on the 1880 U.S. Census as an unincorporated village with 160 residents: 155 Inuit and 5 Creole (Mixed Russian and Native). It returned with 86 residents in 1890, all Native. It did not return again until 1920. It formally incorporated in 1966.

=== 2020 census ===
As of the 2020 census, Old Harbor had a population of 216. The median age was 38.0 years. 23.6% of residents were under the age of 18 and 15.7% of residents were 65 years of age or older. For every 100 females there were 122.7 males, and for every 100 females age 18 and over there were 132.4 males age 18 and over.

0.0% of residents lived in urban areas, while 100.0% lived in rural areas.

There were 95 households in Old Harbor, of which 32.6% had children under the age of 18 living in them. Of all households, 22.1% were married-couple households, 43.2% were households with a male householder and no spouse or partner present, and 22.1% were households with a female householder and no spouse or partner present. About 34.8% of all households were made up of individuals and 15.8% had someone living alone who was 65 years of age or older.

There were 134 housing units, of which 29.1% were vacant. The homeowner vacancy rate was 0.0% and the rental vacancy rate was 7.9%.

Racial composition as of the 2020 census
Race	Number	Percent
White	22	10.2%
Black or African American	0	0.0%
American Indian and Alaska Native	178	82.4%
Asian	2	0.9%
Native Hawaiian and Other Pacific Islander	2	0.9%
Some other race	0	0.0%
Two or more races	12	5.6%
Hispanic or Latino (of any race)	6	2.8%

=== 2000 census ===
As of the census of 2000, there were 237 people, 79 households, and 51 families residing in the city. The population density was 11.3 people per square mile (4.4 people/km^{2}). There were 111 housing units at an average density of 5.3 per square mile (2.0/km^{2}). The racial makeup of the city was 13.08% White, 73.00% Native American, and 13.92% from two or more races.

There were 79 households, out of which 44.3% had children under the age of 18 living with them, 32.9% were married couples living together, 13.9% had a female householder with no husband present, and 34.2% were non-families. 26.6% of all households were made up of individuals, and 3.8% had someone living alone who was 65 years of age or older. The average household size was 3.00 and the average family size was 3.60.

In the city, the age distribution of the population showed 39.7% under the age of 18, 7.6% from 18 to 24, 29.5% from 25 to 44, 19.0% from 45 to 64, and 4.2% who were 65 years of age or older. The median age was 27 years. For every 100 females, there were 127.9 males. For every 100 females of age 18 and over, there were 142.4 males.

The median income for a household in the city was $32,500, and the median income for a family was $26,000. Males had a median income of $33,750 versus $23,750 for females. The per capita income for the city was $14,265. About 30.8% of families and 29.5% of the population were below the poverty line, including 32.5% of those under the age of eighteen and none of those 65 or over.

== Economy ==
The Old Harbor Alliance has an economic plan for the community.

== Education ==
The Old Harbor School, a K-12 rural school, is operated by the Kodiak Island Borough School District.
