= Alaska Museum of Science and Nature =

Museum in Alaska

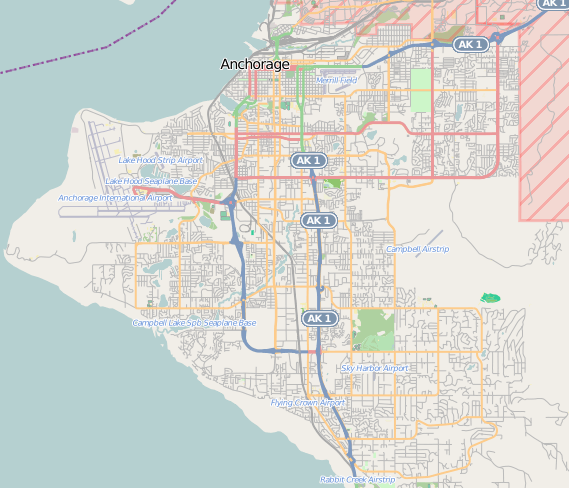
- Location within Anchorage Location within Alaska
- Established: 1994
- Location: 201 N Bragaw St, Anchorage, AK 99508
- Coordinates: 61.2251°N 149.8078°W
- Type: Natural history museum
- President: Dr. Kristine Crossen
- Website: alaskamuseum.org

The Alaska Museum of Science and Nature (AKSCI) is a natural history museum in Anchorage, Alaska. It is known for its collection of fossils.

== History ==
The museum initially opened in 1994, in a shopping mall in the Eagle River community of Anchorage. By 2015, it had moved to its own building in the Mountain View neighborhood.

== Exhibits ==
The museum has six main exhibits: Dinosaurs of Darkness, Alaska Marine Life, Birds of a Feather, Bare Bones, Ice Age Alaska, and Rocks & Minerals. The Dinosaurs exhibit contains skeletons and reproductions of dinosaurs such as Hadrosaurs, Ceratopsians, Albertosaurus, and raptors. The Marine Life exhibit shows off whalebones and skulls and a full skeleton of a beluga whale. The birds exhibit contains a rookery with a variety of bird species, and the bones exhibit contains replicas of human bones and compares them to animal ones. The Ice Age exhibit displays models of animals from the Pleistocene, such as American lions and saber-toothed tigers. The rocks exhibit shows off fluorescent and multi-colored minerals, meteorites, and fossils from the prehistoric forest in Sutton.

The museum contains several life-sized dinosaur paintings by local artist James Haven.
