= Alutiiq Museum =

- Interactive map of the Alutiiq Museum area

General information
- Type: Museum
- Location: Kodiak, Alaska, United States
- Coordinates: 57.7890°N 152.4021°W
- Completed: 1995
- Opened: 1995
- Client: Kodiak Area Native Association
- Owner: Kodiak Area Native Association

Website
- alutiiqmuseum.org

The Alutiiq Museum or Alutiiq Museum and Archaeological Repository is a non-profit museum and cultural center dedicated to preserving and sharing the cultural traditions of the Koniag Alutiiq branch of Sugpiaq ~ Alutiiq of the Alaska Native people.

== Museum and cultural center ==
The museum is located on the first floor of the Alutiiq Center of Kodiak, Alaska. Alutiiq Museum is one of four museums in Kodiak. The museum is the seventh museum in Alaska and the second tribal museum in the United States to be accredited. The museum provides tours of its exhibits, laboratory and collections storage facilities to educational groups. The museum will accept materials relevant to the prehistoric, historic, and contemporary cultural history of the Native peoples who settled the Koniag Alutiiq Nation. Such materials include, but are not limited to, archaeological, ethnological, photographic, film, audio, archival, and natural history specimens. This cultural center features a gallery, storage for more than 190,000 local artifacts, including faunal materials, ethnobotanical samples, sediment samples, field notes, photographs, and maps and a research laboratory. The Alutiiq Museum is a small repository, but we care for a very large collection with nearly 250,000 items. As a newly founded institution, the Alutiiq Museum sought to develop its policies and practices in professional ways. The Alutiiq Museum also uses its collections for community-building among the Alutiiq. The Alutiiq Museum is supported and governed by the Alutiiq Heritage Foundation and is dedicated to preserving and sharing Alutiiq heritage.

The Sugpiaq ~ Alutiiq Nation encompasses the islands and mainland shores of the central Gulf of Alaska, including Prince William Sound, the outer Kenai Peninsula, Kachemak Bay of the Chugach Sugpiaq, and the Kodiak Archipelago and the Alaska Peninsula of the Koniag Alutiiq.

== History ==
The Alutiiq Museum is an outgrowth of the Kodiak Area Native Association's (KANA) culture and heritage division. Founded in 1987, the division was designed to foster island-wide archaeological research, develop educational programs on Sugpiaq ~ Alutiiq culture, and promote workshops on Sugpiaq ~ Alutiiq language and arts. In 1990, the division became the Alutiiq Culture Center and moved to its own building. Large archaeological assemblages from local excavations were returned to Kodiak for curation at the center and public exhibits assembled from these materials.

In 1993, KANA received a grant from the Exxon Valdez Oil Spill Trustee Council to develop a state-of-the-art archaeological repository and regional research facility. The museum opened in April 1995 and opened to the public in May 1995. All archaeological, ethnographic, archival, photographic, and natural history collections from the Alutiiq Culture Center were transferred to the Alutiiq Museum at this time.

The KANA is an ANCSA native association. It was formed in 1966 as a 501 (c)(3) non-profit corporation providing health and social services for the Alaska Natives of the Koniag region. The KANA service area includes the City of Kodiak (Sun'aq) and six Alutiiq villages: Akhiok (Kasukuak), Karluk (Kal'uq), Old Harbor (Nuniaq), Ouzinkie (Uusenkaaq), Port Lions (Masiqsirraq), and Larsen Bay (Uyaqsaq). KANA is governed by a ten-member Board of Directors.

== See also ==
- Yupiit Piciryarait Cultural Center
- List of museums in Alaska
- Sven Haakanson Jr. (former executive director of the Alutiiq Museum)
- Awa'uq Massacre
- Koniag, Incorporated
