= Alutiiq =

Indigenous Alaska Natives

Alutiiq Sugpiat (pl) Sugpiaq (sg) Sugpiak (dual)
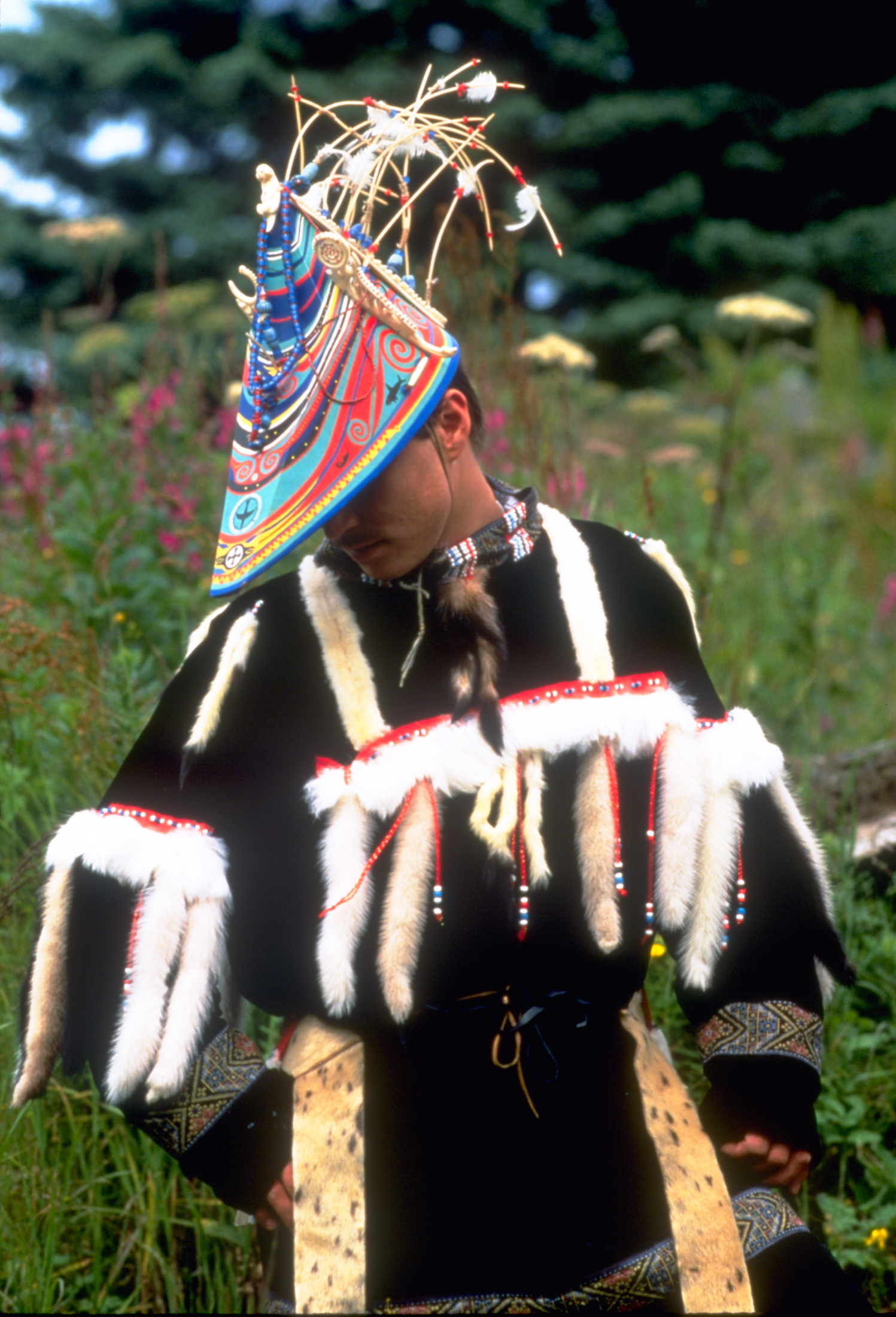
- A Sugpiaq dancer

Total population
- 4,000-12,000

Regions with significant populations
- United States (Alaska): >4,000

Languages
- Sugcestun, English

Religion
- Orthodox Church in America, traditional religion

Related ethnic groups
- Yup'ik, Aleuts

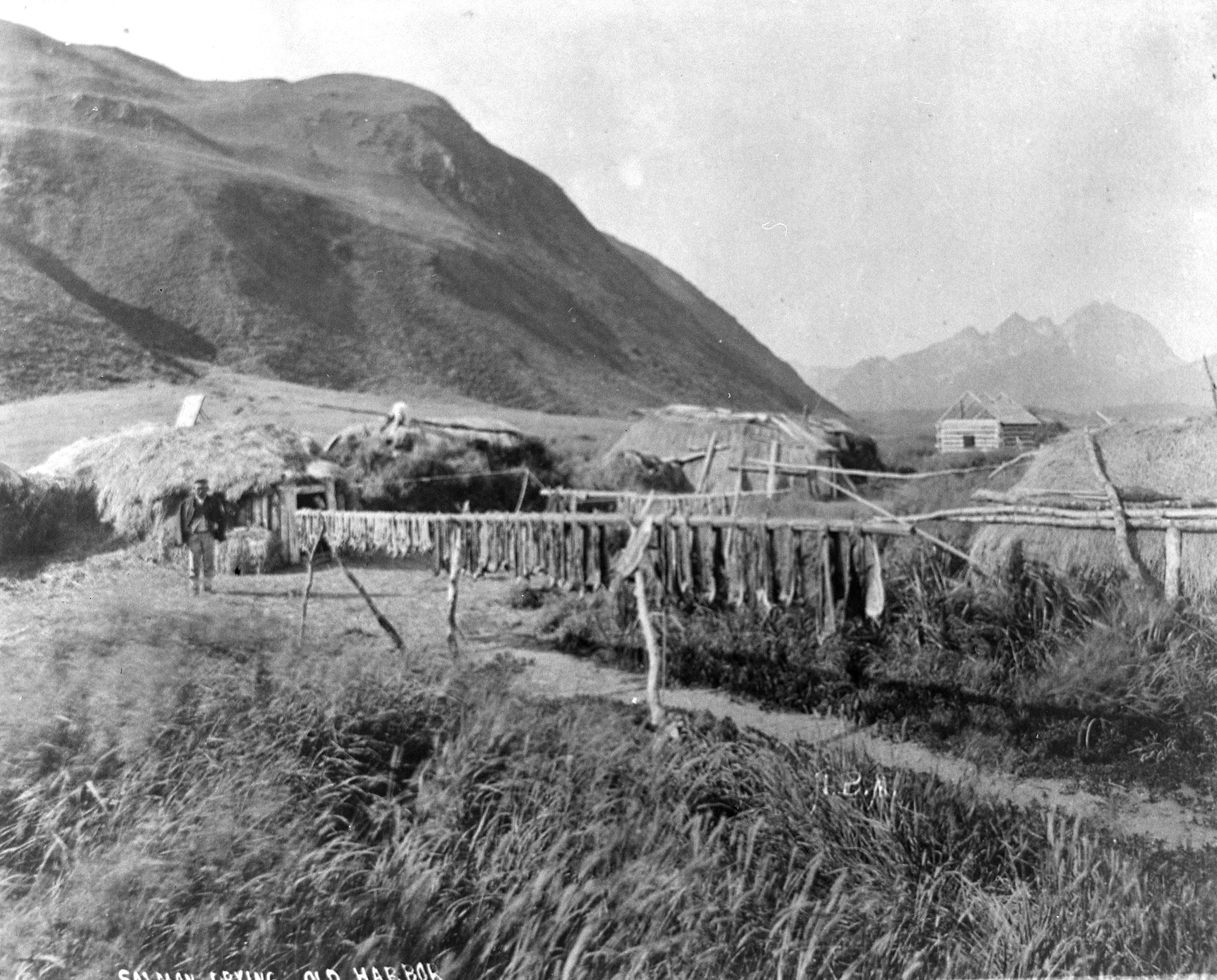
Salmon drying. Alutiiq village, Old Harbor, Kodiak Island. Photographed by N. B. Miller, 1889

The Alutiiq (pronounced /əˈluːtɪk/ ə-LOO-tik in English; from Promyshlenniki Russian Алеутъ, "Aleut"; plural often "Alutiit"), also called by their ancestral name Sugpiaq (/ˈsʊɡˌbjɑːk/ SUUG-byahk or /ˈsʊɡpiˌæk/ SUUG-pee-AK; plural often "Sugpiat"), as well as Pacific Eskimo or Pacific Yupik, are a Yupik peoples, one of eight groups of Alaska Natives that inhabit the southern-central coast of the region.

Their traditional homelands date back to over 7,500 years ago, and include areas such as Prince William Sound and outer Kenai Peninsula (Chugach Sugpiaq), the Kodiak Archipelago and the Alaska Peninsula (Koniag Alutiiq). In the early 1800s there were more than 60 Alutiiq villages in the Kodiak archipelago, with an estimated population of 13,000 people. Today more than 4,000 Alutiiq live in Alaska.

== Terminology ==
At present, the most commonly used title is Alutiiq (singular), Alutiik (dual), Alutiit (plural). These terms derive from the names (Алеутъ, Aleut) that the promyshlenniki (indigenous Siberian and Russian fur traders and settlers) gave to the native people in the region. Russian occupation began in 1784, following the Awa'uq Massacre by Grigory Shelikhov, a fur trader, of hundreds of Sugpiat at Refuge Rock (Awa'uq) just off the coast of Sitkalidak Island near the present-day village of Old Harbor (Nuniaq).

Given the violence underlying the colonial period, and confusion because the Sugpiaq term for Aleut is Alutiiq, some Alaska Natives from the region have advocated use of the terms that the people themselves use to describe their people and language: Sugpiaq (singular), Sugpiak (dual), Sugpiat (plural) — to identify the people (meaning "the real people"), and Sugstun, Sugcestun, Sugt'stun, or Sugtestun to refer to the language. All three names (Alutiiq, Aleut, and Sugpiaq) are used now, according to personal preference. Over time, many other ethnonyms were used to refer to this people.

== Contemporary nations ==
Federally recognized tribes of Alutiiq include:

- Alutiiq Tribe of Old Harbor
- Kaguyak Village
- Native Village of Afognak
- Native Village of Akhiok
- Native Village of Karluk
- Native Village of Larsen Bay
- Native Village of Ouzinkie
- Native Village of Port Lions
- Sun'aq Tribe of Kodiak
- Tangirnaq Native Village

== Culture ==
=== Fishing and subsistence ===
The people traditionally lived a coastal lifestyle, subsisting primarily on ocean resources that were supplemented with rich land resources, such as berries and land mammals. The exact methods of subsistence would change throughout the seasons. Ugnerkaq, or spring, was often regarded as the most difficult season to survive in due to the winter's limiting of resources. During this time, the Alutiiq would turn to the shore, collecting shellfish, hunting octopuses, and picking greens during low tide. As the season furthered, fish and sea mammals would gradually move closer to shore to feed. Alutiiq would then hook cod and halibut, collect herring eggs, and hunt for seals. As Kiak, or summer, approached, activity increased out on the open ocean. Fishing for halibut and cod would continue to remain prevalent, along with the hunting and harvest at seal and sea lion haulouts, and bird rookeries even common feeding grounds for humpback whales. Trees and shrubs such as cedar (Qar’usiq; Qasrulek, Thuja plicata, Callitropsis nootkatensis), Kenai birch, Sitka spruce (Napaq), and other were harvested for their medical and nutritional value. During this time trade would emerge with the natives of mainland Alaska for materials such as antler, ivory, caribou pelts, and glassy stone, not available on Kodiak. During Uksuaq, or fall, much of the work that was done was in preparation for winter. They pick berries sweetened by the first frosts; harvest large quantities of salmon spawning in local streams; hunt fat bears headed for hibernation, and shoot ducks migrating south for the winter. Much of their harvest would be preserved for winter. This was done a variety of ways: from drying, smoking, storing in oil, or freezing foods. During the harsh storms of Uksuq, or winter, most of the season would be spent insides, with occasional breaks in the storms allowing for the trapping of foxes and ermine, hunting ducks, or fishing through lake or river ice. While inside, celebrations and festivals would be held in honor of the harvest, and ancestors

=== Housing ===
Before contact with Russian fur traders, they lived in semi-subterranean homes called ciqlluaq. Today, in the 21st century, the Alutiiq live in coastal fishing communities in more modern housing. They work in all aspects of the modern economy, while also maintaining the cultural value of subsistence.

=== Cultural arts ===
Traditional Alutiiq art are sources of pride for many as they typically highlight the importance of ancestors, the endurance and preservation of tradition, and the beauty of the natural world that sustain Alutiiq life. Physical medians of expression include pinguat–beads (made from shell, bone, ivory, amber, coal, shale, slate and fish vertebrae), woodcarvings in relation to Alutiiq religion, skin sown articles of clothing for celebratory and traditional use, and grass weaving of both artistic expression and functional application. During festivals, story telling, singing and dancing were all important means of passing down history through generations as Alutiiq lacked a formal system of writing.

=== Language ===
In 2010 the high school in Kodiak responded to requests from Alutiiq students and agreed to teach the Alutiiq language. It is one of the Eskaleut languages, belonging to the Yup'ik branch of these languages. The Kodiak dialect of the language was being spoken by only about 50 persons, all of them elderly, and the dialect was in danger of being lost entirely.

== Notable people ==
- Alvin Eli Amason, painter and sculptor
- Deenaalee Chase-Hodgdon, commercial fisher, collective founder, and storyteller
- Sven Haakanson, executive director of the Alutiiq Museum, and winner of a 2007 MacArthur Fellowship.
- Jerry Laktonen, artist / artisan
- Loren Leman, Lieutenant-governor of Alaska, 2002-2006
- Tanya Lukin Linklater, an artist-choreographer
- Linda Infante Lyons, painter and muralist
- Peter the Aleut (Cungagnaq), an Eastern Orthodox saint, reportedly from Kodiak Island
- Mary Peterson, an Alutiiq midwife and healer
- Denise Wallace, a jeweler

== See also ==
- Chugach
