= Alutiiq language =

Eskimo–Aleut language

Alutiiq
- Pacific Gulf Yupik
- Sugt’stun, Alutiit’stun
- Native to: United States
- Region: coastal Alaska (Alaska Peninsula to Prince William Sound)
- Ethnicity: 3,500 Alutiiq people (2010)
- Native speakers: 80 (2020)
- Language family: Eskaleut: Eskimo; Yupik; Alutiiq
- Early forms: Proto-Eskimo–Aleut: Proto-Eskimo; Proto-Yupik
- Writing system: Latin

Official status
- Official language in: Alaska

Language codes
- ISO 639-3: ems
- Glottolog: paci1278
- ELP: Alutiiq
- Pacific Gulf Yupik is classified as Critically Endangered by the UNESCO Atlas of the World's Languages in Danger.

The Alutiiq language (also called Sugpiak, Sugpiaq, Sugcestun, Suk, Supik, Pacific Gulf Yupik, Gulf Yupik, Koniag-Chugach) is a close relative to the Central Alaskan Yup'ik language spoken in the western and southwestern Alaska, but is considered a distinct language.

The ethnonyms of the Sugpiaq-Alutiiq are a predicament. Aleut, Alutiiq, Sugpiaq, Russian, Pacific Eskimo, Unegkuhmiut, and Chugach Eskimo are among the terms that have been used to identify this group of Native people living on the Lower Kenai Peninsula of Alaska.

About 400 of the Alutiiq population of 3,000 still speak the Alutiiq language. Alutiiq communities are currently in the process of revitalizing their language. In 2010 the high school in Kodiak responded to requests from students and agreed to teach the Alutiiq language. The Kodiak dialect of the language was spoken by only about 50 persons, all of them elderly, and the dialect was in danger of being lost entirely. As of 2014, Alaska Pacific University in Anchorage is offering classes using the "Where Are Your Keys?" technique.

== Dialects ==
It has two major dialects:

- Koniag Alutiiq: spoken on the upper part of the Alaska Peninsula and on Kodiak Island; it was also spoken on Afognak Island before that was deserted by the people in the wake of the 1964 Good Friday earthquake
- Chugach Alutiiq: spoken on the Kenai Peninsula and in Prince William Sound

== Phonology ==
=== Consonants ===
		Labial	Alveolar	Palatal	Velar		Uvular	
		Labial	Alveolar	Palatal	plain	lab.	plain	lab.
Nasal	voiceless	m̥	n̥		ŋ̊			
Nasal	voiced	m	n		ŋ			
Stop/Affricate		p	t	t͡ʃ	k	kʷ	q	
Fricative	voiceless	f	s		x	xʷ	χ	χʷ (Note: A /χʷ/ sound sometimes occurs, and is either written as ur, or occurs as a sound of a syllable-final rw; /ʁʷ/, and occurs as an allophone of /ʁʷ/ after consonants like /q/.)
Fricative	voiced				ɣ	ɣʷ	ʁ	ʁʷ
Fricative	lateral		ɬ					
Approximant			l	j		w (Note: [w] is an allophone of /ɣʷ/ syllable-finally and elsewhere.)		

Consonants may be geminated (e.g. kk; [kː]). Two consecutive identical consonants are pronounced either separately or as a geminate depending on dialect. More consonants /ɾ~r, lʲ, rʲ/ are found in loanwords.

=== Vowels ===
	Front	Central	Back
Close	i		u
Mid		ə	
Open		a	

All vowels except /ə/ are considered full vowels and can be either short or long. /ə/ does not lengthen and does not occur in vowel clusters but may tend to be devoiced as [ə̥] next to other consonants.

== Orthography ==
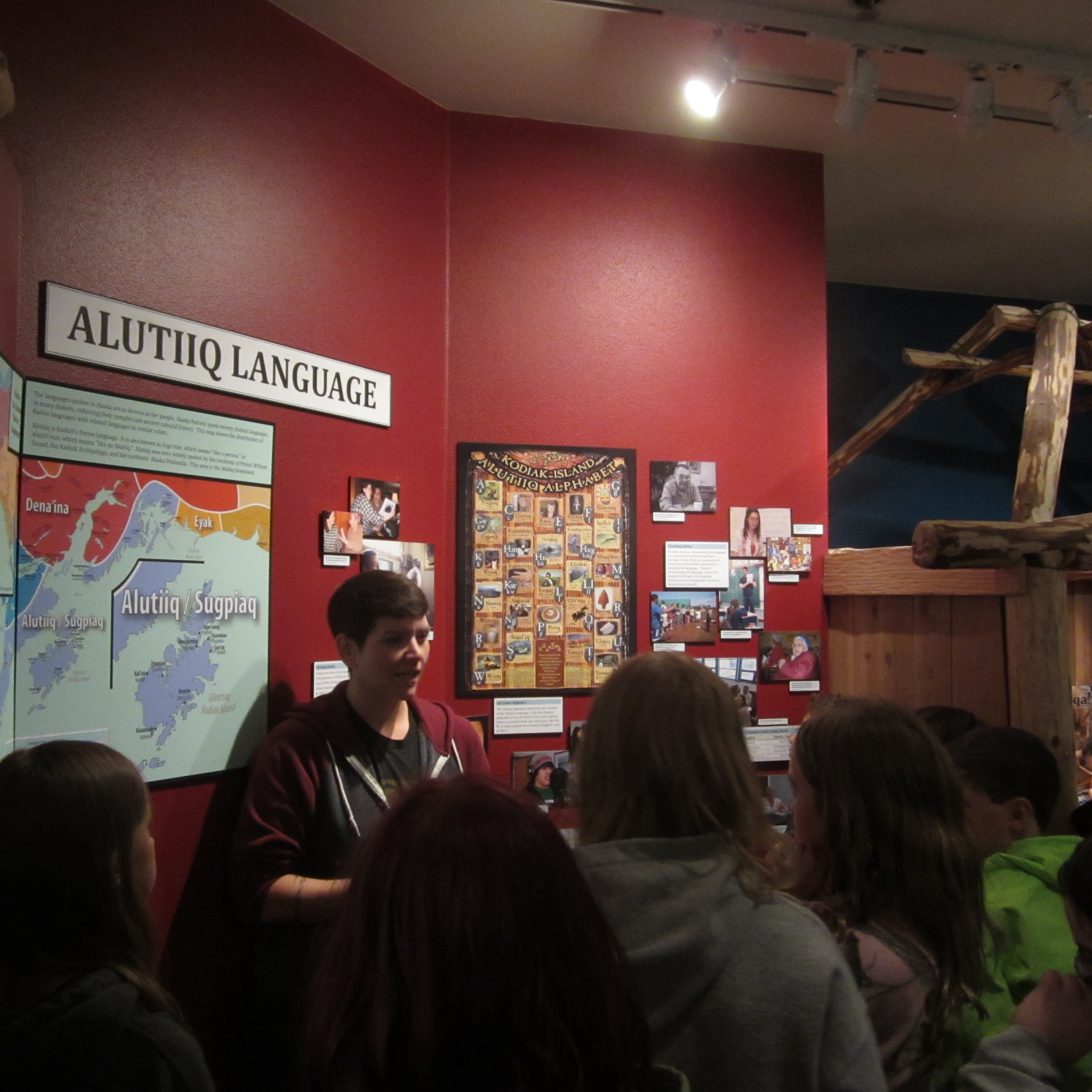
The Alutiiq Museum in Kodiak, Alaska, educates youth about the Alutiiq language

- a – [ä]
- c – [t͡ʃ]
- e – [ə]
- f – [f]
- g – [x]
- gw – [xʷ]
- hm – [m̥]
- hn – [n̥]
- hng – [ŋ̊]
- i – [i]
- k – [k]
- kw – [kʷ]
- l – [l]
- ll – [ɬ]
- m – [m]
- n – [n]
- ng – [ŋ]
- p – [p]
- q – [q]
- r – [χ]
- ʀ – [r]
- s – [s]
- t – [t]
- u – [u]
- w – [w]
- y – [j]

After voiceless consonants, the voiceless nasals are written without h-.

=== Other letters ===
- aa – [aː]
- ai – [ai]
- au – [au]
- ia – [ia]
- ii – [iː]
- iu – [iu]
- ua – [ua]
- ui – [ui]
- uu – [uː]

== Vocabulary comparison ==
The comparison of number terms and month names in the two dialects:

English	Koniag Alutiiq	Chugach Alutiiq	
English	Koniag Alutiiq	Nanwalek & Port Graham	Chenega
1	allringuq / allriluq	allringuq	all'inguq
2	mal'uk	malruk / mall'uk	atel'ek
3	pingayun		pinga'an
4	staaman		
5	talliman		
6	arwilgen		arwinlen
7	mallrungin	mallruungin	maquungwin
8	inglulgen	inglulen	
9	qulnguyan	qulnguan	
10	qulen		
English	Koniag Alutiiq	Chugach Alutiiq	
January	Cuqllirpaaq Iraluq		
February	Nanicqaaq Iraluq	Yaʼalungia'aq	
March	Kaignasqaq Iraluq	Ya'alullraaq	
April	Uqna'isurt'sqaaq Iraluq	Saqulegciq	
May	Nikllit Iraluat	Maniit Ya'allua	
June	Naut'staat Iraluat	Iqallugciq	
July	Amartut Iraluat	.	.
August	Alaganat Iraluat	Uksuam Ya'allua	
September	Qakiiyat Iraluat	Alusastuam Ya'allua	
October	Kakegllum Iralua	.	
November	Quyawim Iralua	Kapkaanam Ya'allua	
December	Qanim Iralua	.	
English	Koniag Alutiiq	Chugach Alutiiq	
