= List of places in Alaska (A) =

This list of cities, towns, unincorporated communities, counties, and other recognized places in the U.S. state of Alaska also includes information on the number and names of counties in which the place lies, and its lower and upper zip code bounds, if applicable.

Name of place	Number of counties	Principal county	Lower zip code	Upper zip code
Abyss Lake	1	Skagway-Hoonah-Angoon Census Area		
Adak	1	Aleutians West Census Area		
Adak Island	1	Aleutians West Census Area		
Adak Naval Security Group	1	Aleutians West Census Area	98777	
Adak Naval Station/Mitchell Field	1	Aleutians West Census Area	98791	
Afognak	1	Kodiak Island Borough		
Agaligamute	1	Bethel Census Area		
Agivavik	1	Dillingham Census Area		
Agowik	1	Nome Census Area		
Aguikchuk	1	Bethel Census Area		
Aguliagamiut	1	Bethel Census Area		
Ahtna	3	Matanuska-Susitna Borough		
Ahtna	3	Valdez-Cordova Census Area		
Ahtna	3	Yukon-Koyukuk Census Area		
Akhiok	1	Kodiak Island Borough	99615	
Akiachak	1	Bethel Census Area	99551	
Akiak	1	Bethel Census Area	99552	
Akolmiut	1	Bethel Census Area	99640	
Akulurak	1	Bethel Census Area		
Akumsuk	1	Kusilvak Census Area		
Akutan	1	Aleutians East Borough	99553	
Alaganik	1	Valdez-Cordova Census Area		
Alakanuk	1	Kusilvak Census Area	99554	
Alaska Gateway Regional Educational Attendance Area	3	Southeast Fairbanks Census Area		
Alaska Gateway Regional Educational Attendance Area	3	Valdez-Cordova Census Area		
Alaska Gateway Regional Educational Attendance Area	3	Yukon-Koyukuk Census Area		
Alatna	1	Yukon-Koyukuk Census Area	99720	
Alcan	1	Southeast Fairbanks Census Area		
Alcan Border	1	Southeast Fairbanks Census Area		
Aleknagik	1	Dillingham Census Area	99555	
Aleknagik Mission	1	Dillingham Census Area		
Aleksashkina	1	Kodiak Island Borough		
Aleneva	1	Kodiak Island Borough		
Aleut	2	Aleutians East Borough		
Aleut	2	Aleutians West Census Area		
Aleutian Islands	1	undetermined borough/census area		
Aleutian Region Regional Educational Attendance Area	1	Aleutians West Census Area		
Aleutians East	1	Aleutians East Borough		
Aleutians East Borough School District	1	Aleutians East Borough		
Aleutians West	1	Aleutians West Census Area		
Alexander	1	Matanuska-Susitna Borough	99501	
Alexanders Village	1	Yukon-Koyukuk Census Area		
Algaacig	1	Kusilvak Census Area		
Alitak	1	Kodiak Island Borough		
Allakaket	1	Yukon-Koyukuk Census Area	99720	
Alpine	1	North Slope Borough		
Alyeska	1	Municipality of Anchorage		
Ambler	1	Northwest Arctic Borough	99786	
Amchitka	1	Aleutians West Census Area		
Anaktuvuk Pass	1	North Slope Borough	99721	
Anchorage	1	Municipality of Anchorage	99501	40
Anchorage International Airport	1	Municipality of Anchorage	99502	
Anchorage School District	1	Municipality of Anchorage		
Anchor Point	1	Kenai Peninsula Borough	99556	
Anderson	1	Denali Borough	99744	
Andreafsky	1	Kusilvak Census Area	99658	
Angoon	1	Skagway-Hoonah-Angoon Census Area	99820	
Aniak	1	Bethel Census Area	99557	
Aniak Airport	1	Bethel Census Area	99557	
Aniakchak National Monument and Preserve	1	Dillingham Census Area		
Annette	1	Prince of Wales-Outer Census Area	99926	
Annette Coast Guard Air Station	1	Prince of Wales-Outer Census Area	99920	
Annette Island	1	Prince of Wales-Outer Census Area		
Annette Island Regional Educational Attendance Area	1	Prince of Wales-Outer Census Area		
Annette Islands Reserve	1	Prince of Wales-Outer Census Area		
Anogok	1	Bethel Census Area		
Anvik	1	Yukon-Koyukuk Census Area	99558	
Arctic Slope	1	North Slope Borough		
Arctic Village	1	Yukon-Koyukuk Census Area	99722	
Arolik	1	Bethel Census Area		
Artesian Village	1	Municipality of Anchorage		
Atka	1	Aleutians West Census Area	99547	
Atka	1	Aleutians West Census Area	99502	
Atkasook	1	North Slope Borough		
Atmautluak	1	Bethel Census Area	99559	
Atqasuk	1	North Slope Borough	99791	
Attu	1	Aleutians West Census Area		
Attu Island	1	Aleutians West Census Area		
Attu Station	1	Aleutians West Census Area		
Auke Bay	1	City and Borough of Juneau	99821	
Aurora	1	Fairbanks North Star Borough	99709	
Aurora Lodge	1	Fairbanks North Star Borough	99714	
