= National Register of Historic Places listings in Kodiak Island Borough, Alaska =

Location of the Kodiak Island Borough in Alaska

This is a list of the National Register of Historic Places listings in Kodiak Island Borough, Alaska.

This is intended to be a complete list of the properties and districts on the National Register of Historic Places in Kodiak Island Borough, Alaska, United States. The locations of National Register properties and districts for which the latitude and longitude coordinates are included below, may be seen in a Google map.

There are 27 properties and districts listed on the National Register in the borough, including four National Historic Landmarks.

This National Park Service list is complete through NPS recent listings posted August 7, 2026.

== Current listings ==
	Name on the Register	Image	Date listed	Location	City or town	Description
1	Agricultural Experiment Station Barn		July 21, 2004 (#04000716)	614 Egan Way; 57°47′32″N 152°23′51″W	Kodiak	
2	AHRS Site KOD-207		December 1, 1978 (#78003428)	Address restricted	Kodiak	
3	Amalik Bay Archeological District	Amalik Bay Archeological District	April 5, 2005 (#05000460)	Katmai National Park and Preserve; 58°03′41″N 154°29′40″W	King Salmon	
4	American Cemetery	American Cemetery	April 10, 1980 (#80004570)	Upper Mill Bay Road; 57°47′28″N 152°24′05″W	Kodiak	
5	Archeological Site 49 AF 3		February 17, 1978 (#78000276)	Address restricted	Katmai National Park and Preserve	Originally listed as being in Dillingham Census Area.
6	Archeological Site 49 MK 10		June 23, 1978 (#78000425)	near Dakavak Bay	Katmai National Park and Preserve	Originally listed as being in Bristol Bay Borough.
7	Ascension of Our Lord Chapel	Ascension of Our Lord Chapel	June 6, 1980 (#80004580)	In Karluk; 57°34′09″N 154°27′30″W	Karluk	
8	Cape Alitak Petroglyphs District		April 9, 2013 (#13000139)	Address restricted	Akhiok	
9	Fort Abercrombie State Historic Site	Fort Abercrombie State Historic Site	October 27, 1970 (#70000917)	Miller Point, about 5 miles (8.0 km) northeast of Kodiak; 57°49′52″N 152°21′21″W	Kodiak Island	Also part of the Kodiak Naval Operating Base and Forts Greely and Abercrombie National Historic Landmark.
10	Holy Resurrection Church	Holy Resurrection Church	December 12, 1977 (#77001574)	Corner of Mission Road and Kashevaroff Avenue; 57°47′19″N 152°24′09″W	Kodiak	
11	Kad'yak		July 14, 2004 (#04000678)	Address restricted	Kodiak	Wreck of a Russian-era ship.
12	Kaguyak Village Site		June 23, 1978 (#78000274)	Address restricted	Katmai National Park and Preserve	Originally listed as being in Dillingham Census Area.
13	KOD-171 Site		August 13, 1981 (#81000707)	Address restricted	Larsen Bay	
14	KOD-233 Site		August 13, 1981 (#81000708)	Address restricted	Larsen Bay	
15	Kodiak 011 Site		July 21, 1980 (#80004571)	Address restricted	Kodiak	
16	Kodiak Naval Operating Base and Forts Greely and Abercrombie	Kodiak Naval Operating Base and Forts Greely and Abercrombie	February 4, 1985 (#85002731)	Vicinity of Kodiak; 57°44′19″N 152°30′17″W	Kodiak	Surviving World War II military infrastructures on Kodiak Island, comprising several areas. Kodiak Naval Base is about 6 miles (9.7 km) southwest of Kodiak. Fort Greely is about 3 miles (4.8 km) southwest of Kodiak. Fort Abercrombie is about 5 miles (8.0 km) northeast of Kodiak.
17	Kukak Cannery Archeological Historic District	Kukak Cannery Archeological Historic District	April 7, 2003 (#03000192)	In Kukak Bay; 58°19′01″N 154°11′19″W	Katmai National Park and Preserve	Site of a 1920s–30s razor clam cannery, burned in 1936. Originally listed as being in Lake and Peninsula Borough.
18	Kukak Village Site	Kukak Village Site	July 20, 1978 (#78000343)	At the entrance to Kukak Bay; 58°20′51″N 154°12′28″W	Kanatak	Originally listed as being in the Dillingham Census Area.
19	Church of the Nativity of the Theotokos	Church of the Nativity of the Theotokos	June 6, 1980 (#80004577)	In Afognak; 58°00′38″N 152°45′52″W	Afognak	
20	Nativity of Our Lord Chapel	Nativity of Our Lord Chapel	June 6, 1980 (#80004582)	Church Street; 57°55′23″N 152°30′01″W	Ouzinkie	
21	Protection of the Theotokos Chapel	Protection of the Theotokos Chapel	June 6, 1980 (#80004590)	E Street; 56°56′42″N 154°10′05″W	Akhiok	
22	Russian-American Company Magazin	Russian-American Company Magazin	October 15, 1966 (#66000954)	101 East Marine Way; 57°47′16″N 152°24′12″W	Kodiak	Also known as the "Erskine House and Baranof Museum".
23	SS Aleutian (Shipwreck)	SS Aleutian (Shipwreck)	June 18, 2004 (#04000593)	Southern tip of Amook Island; 57°29′N 153°50′W	Larsen Bay	
24	Sts. Sergius and Herman of Valaam Chapel	Sts. Sergius and Herman of Valaam Chapel	June 6, 1980 (#80004581) (Note: There's an error in NRHP listing for this building. Listing 80004581 attached form and pictures refer to Sts. Sergius and Herman of Valaam Church in Nanwalek. The correct form and pictures for this building are attached to listing 80004587 (form and pictures))	Spruce Island, Monk's Lagoon; 57°54′22″N 152°21′10″W	Ouzinkie	
25	Takli Island Archeological District	Takli Island Archeological District	May 23, 1978 (#78000275)	Katmai National Park and Preserve; 58°03′50″N 154°30′25″W	Kanatak	This district is entirely within the Amalik Bay Archeological District; Takli Island is in Amalik Bay. Originally listed as being in the Dillingham Census Area.
26	Three Saints Site	Three Saints Site	February 23, 1972 (#72001541)	Address restricted	Old Harbor	
27	Woody Island Historic Archeological District		January 27, 2015 (#14001196)	Address restricted	Kodiak	

== See also ==
- List of National Historic Landmarks in Alaska
- National Register of Historic Places listings in Alaska
