= Afognak =

Afognak can refer to:

- Afognak Island, an island in the U.S. state of Alaska
- Afognak, Alaska, the former village located on the island of Afognak
- Native Village of Afognak, the federally recognized tribe of Alutiiqs descended from the inhabitants of the island
