= USFS Blue Wing =

American fishery patrol vessel

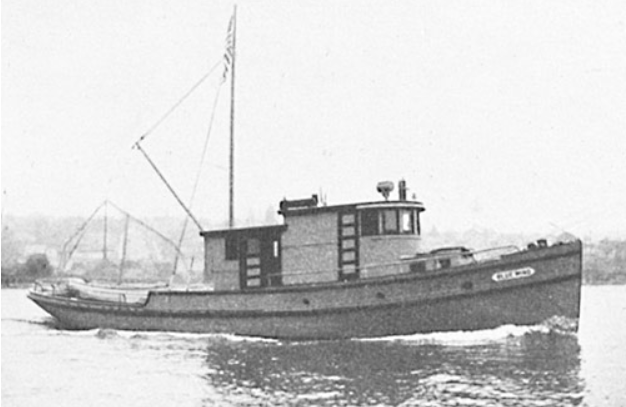
- USFS Blue Wing in 1925

United States
- Name: August
- Owner: Private ownership
- Completed: 1918
- Fate: Sold to U.S. Bureau of Fisheries 1924

U.S. Bureau of Fisheries
- Name: USFS Blue Wing
- Namesake: Blue-winged teal (Spatula discors), a dabbling duck in the family Anatidae
- Acquired: 1924
- Commissioned: 1924
- Identification: WTDK
- Fate: Transferred to United States Fish and Wildlife Service 30 June 1940

U.S. Fish and Wildlife Service
- Name: US FWS Blue Wing
- Namesake: Previous name retained
- Acquired: 30 June 1940
- Fate: Sold during or after 1951
- Status: Extant as of 1951
- Notes: Renamed El Don after sale

General characteristics (as BOF fishery patrol vessel)
- Type: Fishery patrol vessel
- Tonnage: 22 GRT; 18 NRT
- Length: 49.6 ft (15.1 m)
- Beam: 12.5 ft (3.8 m)
- Draft: 5.7 ft (1.7 m)
- Propulsion: As built: 1 × 50 hp (37 kW) Union engine; Winter 1929–1930 or winter 1930–1931 (see text): 1 x 50 hp (37 kW) three-cylinder Standard gasoline engine

USFS Blue Wing was an American fishery patrol vessel that operated in the waters of the Territory of Alaska. She was part of the United States Bureau of Fisheries (BOF) fleet from 1924 to 1940. She then served as US FWS Blue Wing in the fleet of the Fish and Wildlife Service from 1940 until at least 1951. Before her United States Government service, she was the commercial purse seiner August. In private ownership after the conclusion of her U.S. Government career she was renamed El Don.

== Bureau of Fisheries ==
=== Construction and acquisition ===
The vessel was constructed in 1918 as the commercial purse seiner August. The United States Bureau of Fisheries (BOF) purchased her in 1924 and renamed her USFS Blue Wing.

=== Operational history ===
On 29 July 1924, Blue Wing departed Seattle, Washington, to head north to the Territory of Alaska to begin her first season of fishery patrol work. She patrolled in Southeast Alaska until early September 1924, then moved to Cook Inlet on the coast of Southcentral Alaska to patrol there.

In 1925, Blue Wing was reassigned to summer patrol duties in the Kodiak Archipelago. Based at the BOF fish hatchery at Afognak Lake (also known as Litnik Lake) on Afognak Island, for the next ten years she served as tender to the hatchery and conducted fishery protection patrols around Kodiak Island and Afognak Island each summer. Each autumn, she usually moved to Southeast Alaska to patrol there for the remainder of the season.

During either the winter of 1929–1930 or the winter of 1930–1931 (sources disagree), Blue Wing underwent a significant renovation during which her original 50-horsepower (37 kW) Union engine was replaced by a 50-horsepower (37 kW) three-cylinder Standard gasoline engine taken from the BOF fishery patrol vessel USFS Scoter when Scoter received a new engine. Scoter's original engine was rebored before being installed on Blue Wing.

During the mid-1930s, Blue Wing added Bristol Bay to her patrol areas. In June 1936, her service in the Kodiak Archipelago came to an end and her summer patrol responsibilities shifted to Prince William Sound in Southcentral Alaska. During the spring of 1937, she assisted in the replacement of stream markers in the Ketchikan district in Southeast Alaska.

== Fish and Wildlife Service ==
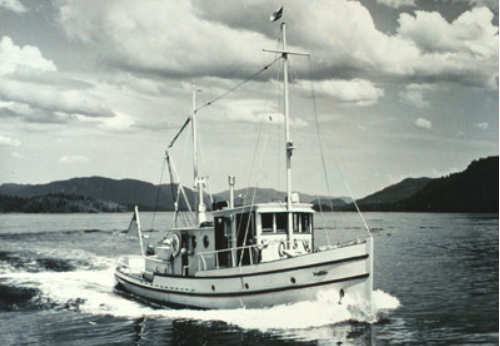
US FWS Blue Wing in 1947 after a major renovation.

In 1939, the BOF was transferred from the United States Department of Commerce to the United States Department of the Interior, and on 30 June 1940, it was merged with the Interior Department's Division of Biological Survey to form the new Fish and Wildlife Service (FWS), an element of the Interior Department that was destined to become the United States Fish and Wildlife Service in 1956. The vessel thus became part of the FWS fleet as US FWS Blue Wing.

In 1941, Blue Wing suffered engine damage during a severe gale off British Columbia, Canada, and narrowly avoided running ground. A search for her began when she was reported missing. After several days, Canadian police found her at anchor on the British Columbia coast while her crew attempted to repair her engine.

In February 1951, Blue Wing was still in FWS service, based at Craig in Southeast Alaska. At some point thereafter she was sold into private ownership, and later had the name El Don.
