= USS Surveyor =

US navy steamer

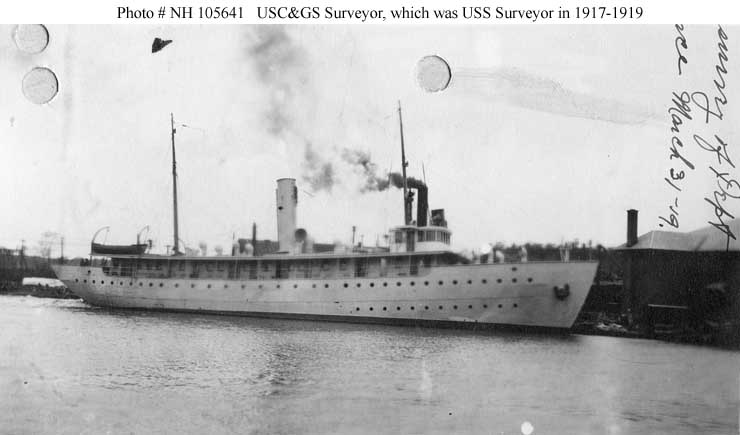
- Surveyor, possibly at the time of her completion in 1917 as a survey ship for the U.S. Coast and Geodetic Survey

History

United States
- Name: USC&GS Surveyor
- Namesake: A surveyor is a member of the profession of surveying, which determines positions on the Earth's surface
- Operator: United States Coast and Geodetic Survey
- Builder: Manitowoc Shipbuilding and Drydock Company, Manitowoc, Wisconsin
- Cost: $236,000 USD
- Completed: 1917
- Fate: Transferred to U.S. Navy 24 September 1917

History

United States Navy
- Name: USS Surveyor
- Namesake: Previous name retained
- Operator: U.S. Navy
- Acquired: 24 September 1917
- Commissioned: 22 October 1917
- Stricken: 31 March 1919
- Fate: Transferred to U.S. Coast and Geodetic Survey 31 March 1919

History

United States
- Name: Surveyor
- Namesake: A surveyor is a member of the profession of surveying, which determines positions on the earth's surface
- Operator: United States Coast and Geodetic Survey
- Acquired: 31 March 1919
- Commissioned: 1919
- Decommissioned: 1956

General characteristics (as U.S. Navy vessel)
- Type: Armed steamer
- Displacement: 1,143 tons
- Length: 186 ft (57 m)
- Beam: 34 ft (10 m)
- Draft: 12 ft (3.7 m)
- Propulsion: Steam engine
- Speed: 13.3 knots
- Complement: 85
- Armament: 2 × 3-inch) 76.2-millimeter) guns; 2 × machine guns; Armament removed January 1919

General characteristics (as U.S. Coast and Geodetic Survey vessel)
- Type: Survey ship
- Displacement: 1,143 tons
- Length: 186 ft (57 m)
- Beam: 34 ft 3 in (10.44 m)
- Draft: 12 ft (3.7 m)
- Propulsion: Steam engine
- Speed: 13.3 knots

USS Surveyor was an armed steamer that served in the United States Navy from 1917 to 1919. Prior to her U.S. Navy service, she operated as the survey ship USC&GS Surveyor for the United States Coast and Geodetic Survey in 1917, and she returned to that role after her U.S. Navy decommissioning, remaining in Coast and Geodetic Survey service until 1956.

== Construction and commissioning ==
Surveyor was built at a cost of US$236,000 as the survey ship USC&GS Surveyor in 1917 by Manitowoc Shipbuilding and Drydock Company at Manitowoc, Wisconsin, for the United States Coast and Geodetic Survey, and was commissioned into service with the Coast and Geodetic Survey that year.

== Operational history ==
=== U.S. Navy service ===
The Coast and Geodetic Survey transferred Surveyor to the U.S. Navy on 24 September 1917 for service in World War I. The Navy commissioned her as USS Surveyor on 22 October 1917.

On 9 November 1917, Surveyor was ordered to report to Squadron Two, Patrol Force, based at Gibraltar to provide convoy escort services. She served overseas from 5 February 1918 through the end of World War I. After the Armistice with Germany of 11 November 1918, she returned to the United States. Her armament was removed in January 1919.

Surveyor was struck from the Navy List and returned to the United States Department of Commerce on 31 March 1919.

=== U.S. Coast and Geodetic Survey service ===
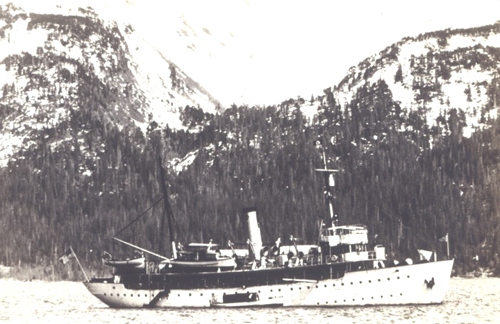
Surveyor in Prince William Sound on the south-central coast of the Territory of Alaska while in service with the United States Coast and Geodetic Survey.

The U.S. Department of Commerce assigned Surveyor to the U.S. Coast and Geodetic Survey so that she could resume service as a survey ship. Once again USC&GS Surveyor, she departed the United States East Coast and proceeded to the United States West Coast via the Panama Canal in 1919. For the next 36 years, Surveyor operated almost exclusively in the waters of the Territory of Alaska, working in the North Pacific Ocean and Bering Sea.

During her Coast and Geodetic Survey career, Surveyor had occasion to assist mariners in distress. After the 153 survivors of the passenger steamer Aleutian – which had struck a rock and sunk with the loss of one crewman off the south end of Amook Island (57°25′30″N 153°50′30″W) in Uyak Bay (57.8000°N 154.0667°W) on the coast of Kodiak Island in the Kodiak Archipelago on 26 May 1929 – reached Larsen Bay on Kodiak Island aboard a small motorboat and a cannery tender, Surveyor picked them up at Larsen Bay and transported them to Seward in Southcentral Alaska. On 7 September 1929, she rendered assistance to survivors of the steamer Golden Forest, which was wrecked on Cape Ilktugitak; she located the wreck using radio compass bearings and took aboard two men from Golden Forest for medical treatment. On 31 July 1934, she assisted the steamer SS Otsego, which had grounded off Cape Mordvinof, Alaska.

Tragedy struck Surveyor's crew more than once during her operations. On 4 October 1927, two men from her crew — Roy V. Beverly and George Slavin — drowned at Resurrection Bay off Seward; another crewman, Seaman W. H. Bowen, drowned in a heroic attempt to save his two shipmates, and posthumously received the Department of Commerce Gold Medal. In 1936, she lost members of her crew on three occasions: John Martin, her ship's cook, died in a shipboard accident in January 1936; two members of a shore party – Lieutenant, junior grade, Marshall R. Reese of the United States Coast and Geodetic Survey Corps and Quartermaster Max McLees — drowned on 26 September 1936 when their boat overturned on the north shore of Unalaska Island in the Aleutian Islands; and Seaman Robert F. Stryker died in October 1936 when he fell off a cliff during survey operations on Unimak Island in the Aleutians.

During World War II in the Pacific (1941–1945), Surveyor conducted surveys in support of Allied military operations against Japanese forces in the Aleutian Islands during the Aleutian Islands Campaign.

Surveyor was retired from Coast and Geodetic Survey service in 1956.

== Commemoration ==
Surveyor Bay on the coast of Unalaska Island in the Aleutian Islands is named for Surveyor.
