= Native Village of Port Lions =

Federally recognized Alaska Native tribe

Native Village of Port Lions Masiqsirraq (Alutiiq)
- Alaska Native village
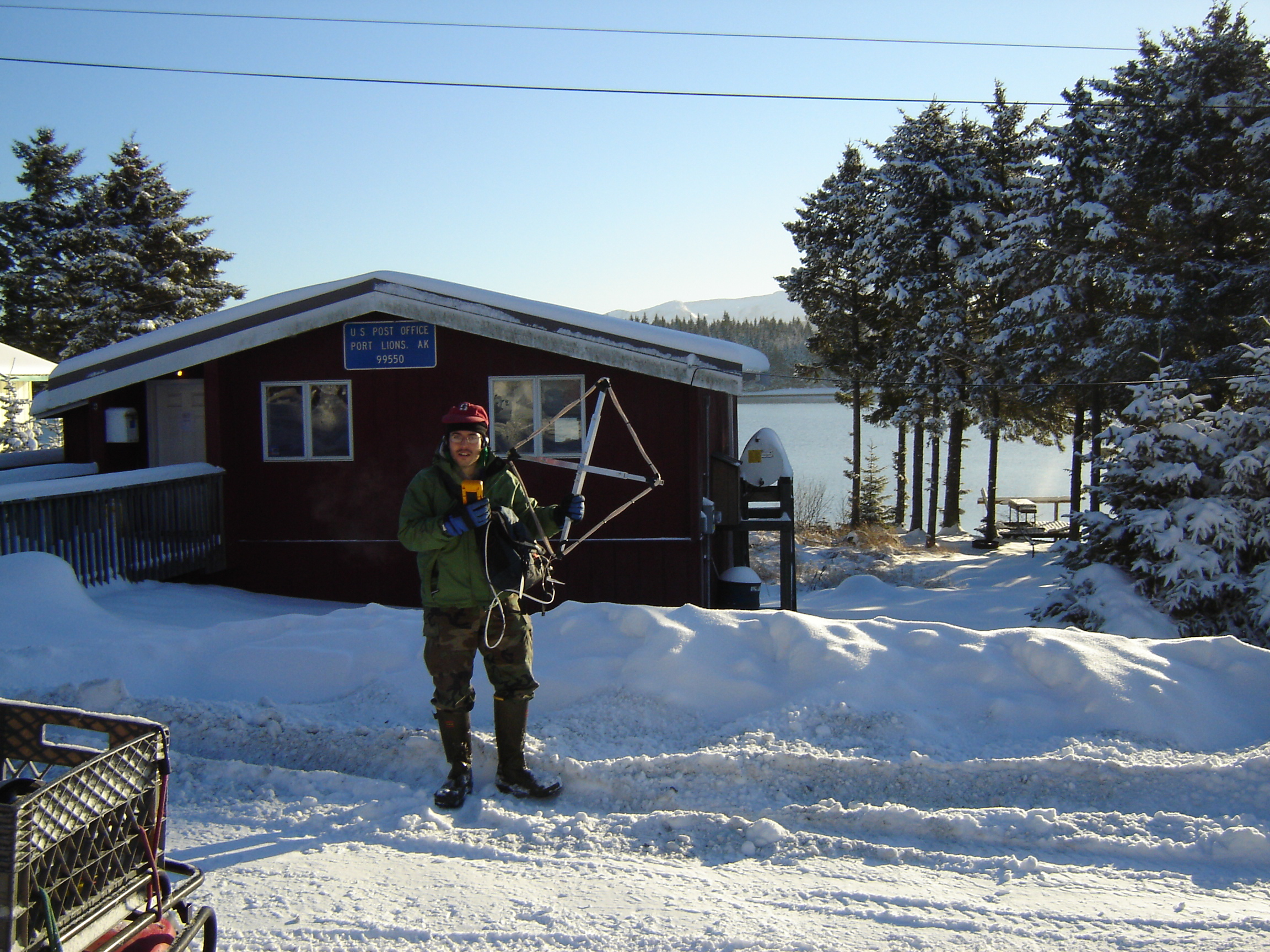
- Post office in Port Lions

- Location within Alaska
- Coordinates: 57°52′07″N 152°52′49″W
- Established: 1964; 62 years ago
- Capital: Port Lions, Alaska

Government
  - Type: Representative democracy
  - Body: Port Lions Tribal Council
  - President: Charlea Kewan-Bartleson

Population
  - Estimate: 161
- Demonym: Koniag Alutiiq
- Time zone: UTC–09:00 (AKST)
  - Summer (DST): UTC–08:00 (AKDT)
- Website: portlionstribe.net

The Native Village of Port Lions is a federally recognized Alaska Native tribe of Koniag Alutiiq. This Alaska Native tribe is headquartered in Port Lions, Alaska.

== Government ==
The Native Village of Port Lions is led by a democratically elected tribal council. Its president is Charlea Kewan-Bartleson. The Alaska Regional Office of the Bureau of Indian Affairs serves the tribe. The tribe ratified its constitution in 2000.

The tribe is a member of the National Congress of American Indians.

== Territory ==
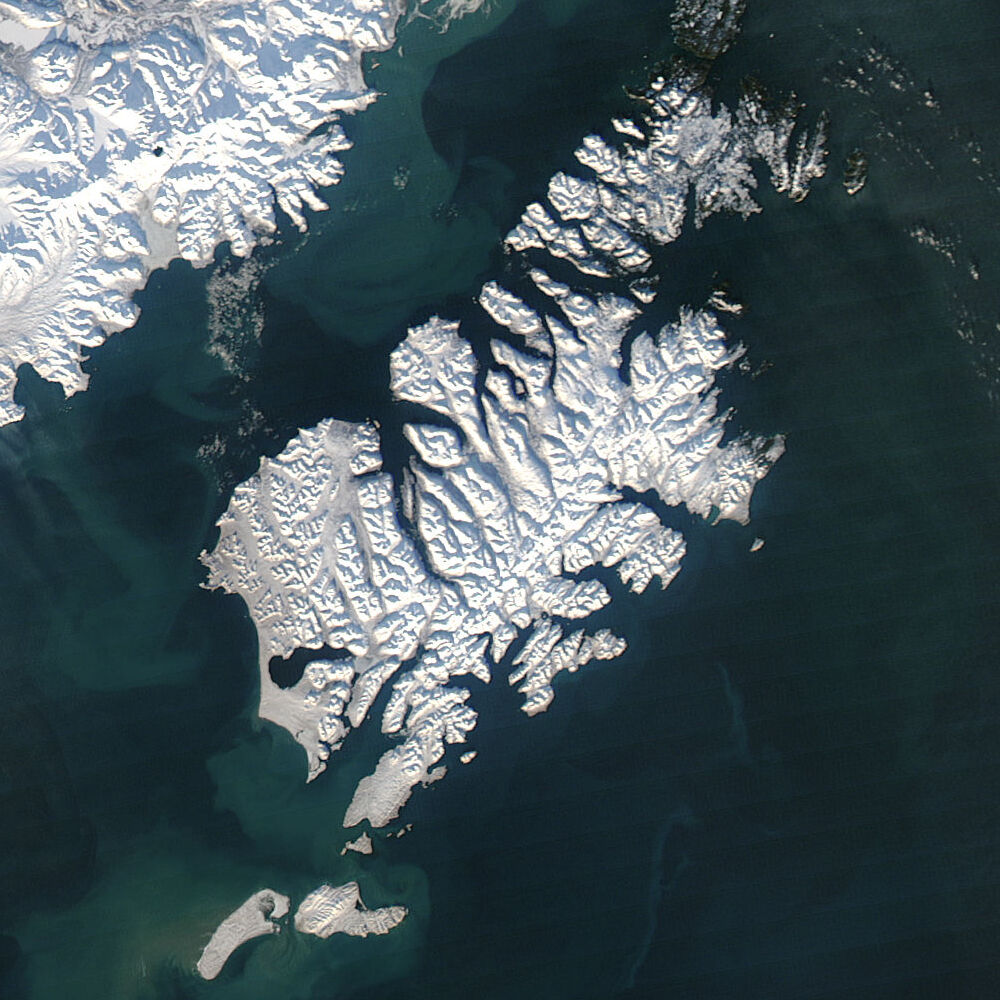
Satellite image of Kodiak Island

The Good Friday earthquake of 1964 resulted in the relocation of surviving residents of the village of Ag’waneq on the island of Afognak. A new village, Port Lions (named for the Lions Club who helped construct it), was constructed to house the tribe, but many moved on to Kodiak and are now citizens of the Native Village of Afognak.

The tribe is headquartered in Port Lions, Alaska, which is near Settler Cove on Kodiak Island close to the Gulf of Alaska and the Kodiak National Wildlife Refuge. The island is accessible by boat and plane.

== Economy ==
Commercial fishing, substitence hunting, and working in hunting lodges are important to the Port Lions economy.

The Native Village of Port Lions is affiliated with Koniag, Incorporated, an Alaska Native corporation, and Kodiak Area Native Association, an ANCSA Village Corporation. The tribe partnered with the Kodiak Archipelago Leadership Institute in 2015 to develop the Port Lions Farm with hydroponic farms to provide food for the community. They are researching mariculture (marine farming), especially kelp farming to provide sustainable economical development and food sovereignty.

== Language ==
The Native Village of Port Lions speaks English and the Alutiiq language.

== Climate change ==
Alaska Natives are already feeling the effects of climate change from increased fires, harsher storms, melting permafrost, erosion along the coasts, and weather patterns shifting. To address these threats, in 2006, 162 Alaska Native tribes, including the Alutiiq Tribe of Old Harbor, and corporations working with the Native American Rights Fund, signed a Climate Change resolution calling upon Congress to pass laws to reduce greenhouse gas emissions.
