= KOD-171 Site =

Archaeological site in Alaska, United States

- U.S. National Register of Historic Places
- Alaska Heritage Resources Survey
- Location: Address restricted
- Nearest city: Larsen Bay, Alaska
- Area: 3.4 acres (1.4 ha)
- NRHP reference No.: 81000707
- AHRS No.: KOD-171
- Added to NRHP: August 13, 1981

KOD-171 is a prehistoric and historic archaeological site in the vicinity of Larsen Bay, a city on the north side of Kodiak Island in southern Alaska. The site was discovered by Smithsonian Institution archaeologist Aleš Hrdlička and described in 1944 as containing both historical Russian artifacts as well as prehistoric Kachemak Bay tradition artifacts. A 1978 survey team reported the site to include 22 house pits and an eroding shell midden. The site, listed on the National Register of Historic Places in 1981, is subject to erosion and vandalism by pot hunters.

== See also ==
- National Register of Historic Places listings in Kodiak Island Borough, Alaska
