= Church of the Nativity of the Theotokos (Afognak, Alaska) =

Historic Russian Orthodox church in Afognak, Alaska

- Nativity of Holy Theotokos Church
- U.S. National Register of Historic Places
- Alaska Heritage Resources Survey
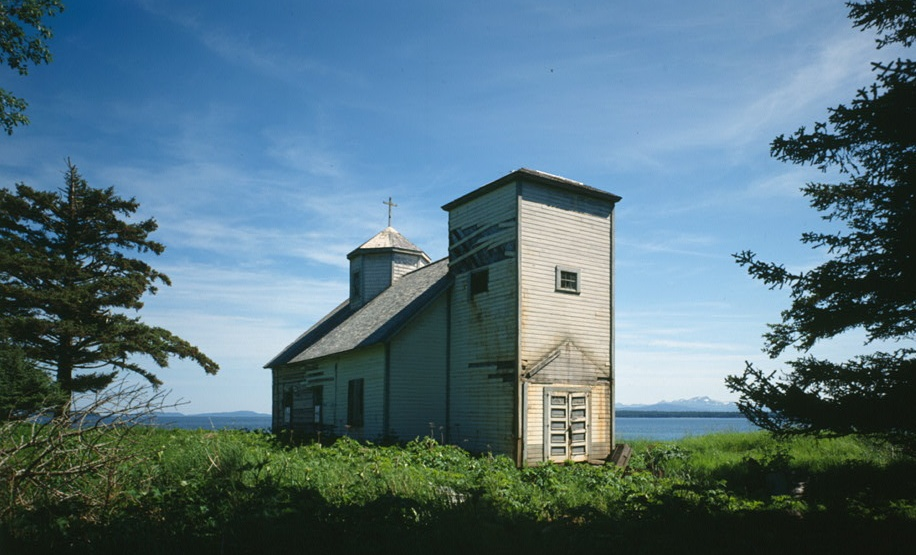
- HABS photo, 1990

- Location within Alaska
- Location: Afognak, Alaska
- Coordinates: 58°0′38″N 152°45′52″W
- Area: less than one acre
- Built: 1905
- MPS: Russian Orthodox Church Buildings and Sites TR
- NRHP reference No.: 80004577
- AHRS No.: AFG-080

Significant dates
- Added to NRHP: June 6, 1980
- Designated AHRS: April 10, 1979

The Nativity of Holy Theotokos Church is a historic Russian Orthodox church in Afognak, Alaska. The present church is the third Russian Orthodox church built in Afognak, and replaced the second which had been built in the late 1800s. Its construction began in 1901, and was completed in 1905. The community was mostly "washed out" by a 1964 tsunami, and moved to Port Lions, but the church building remained.

In 1979, it was believed that the community would return and that the church would be used again, although it would be necessary to move the church further away from the water's edge.

The church was added to the National Register of Historic Places in 1980.

== See also ==
- National Register of Historic Places listings in Kodiak Island Borough, Alaska
