= SS Aleutian =

Passenger liner

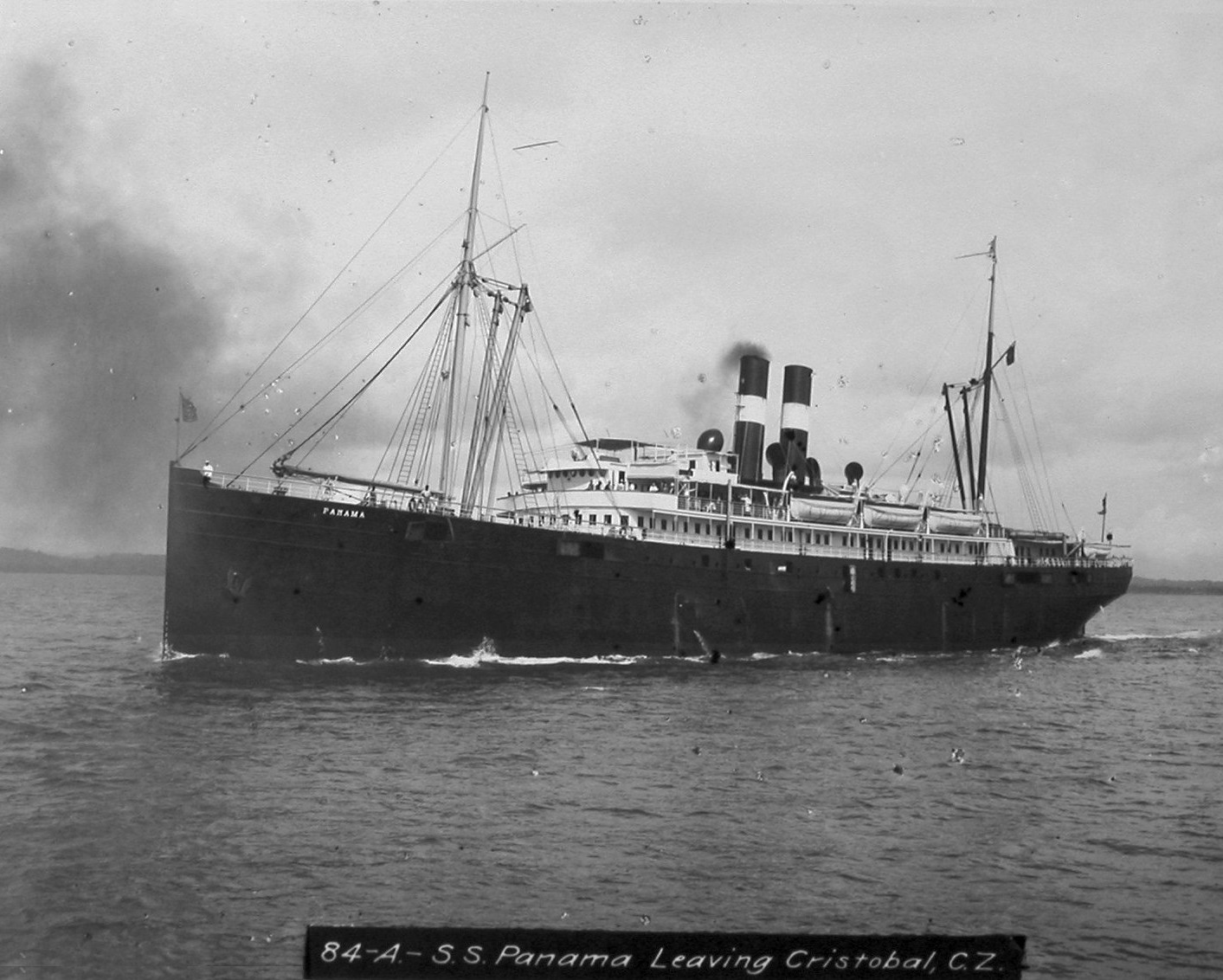
- SS Panama, later Aleutian, leaving Cristobal, Canal Zone, date unknown

History

- Name: SS Havana
- Operator: Ward Line (1899–1905)
- Builder: William Cramp & Sons, Philadelphia
- Yard number: 294
- Completed: January 1899
- Identification: U.S. O/N:96435
- Fate: Sold 1905

- Name: SS Panama
- Operator: Panama Railroad Steamship Company
- Acquired: 1905
- Fate: Sold 1926

- Name: SS Aleutian
- Operator: Alaska Steamship Company
- Acquired: 1926
- Fate: Wrecked 26 May 1929

General characteristics
- Type: Passenger liner
- Tonnage: 5,708
- Length: 360 ft (110 m)
- Beam: 50 ft (15 m)
- Installed power: 2 x triple expansion engines
- Propulsion: Twin screw
- Speed: 15 knots (28 km/h; 17 mph)
- SS Aleutian (Shipwreck)
- U.S. National Register of Historic Places
- Location: 57.4250°N 153.8450°W
- Nearest city: Larsen Bay, Alaska
- NRHP reference No.: 04000593
- Added to NRHP: June 18, 2004

SS Aleutian was a passenger ship in North American coastal service. Built in 1899 for the Ward Line as SS Havana, she would later serve the building of the Panama Canal as SS Panama and ultimately enter Alaskan service as SS Aleutian.

== Ward Line service ==
In 1898 the Ward Line ordered two ships from William Cramp & Sons Shipbuilding Company in Philadelphia as part of a modernization plan in response to increased passenger and freight demand. The new passenger ship SS Havana was delivered in 1899 and briefly saw military transport service (Official Number 96435) during the Spanish–American War moving two infantry units from Havana, Cuba to Savannah, Georgia. She soon joined the company's steamers linking New York with Nassau, Havana, and Mexican Gulf ports.

== Panama Railroad Steamship Company service ==
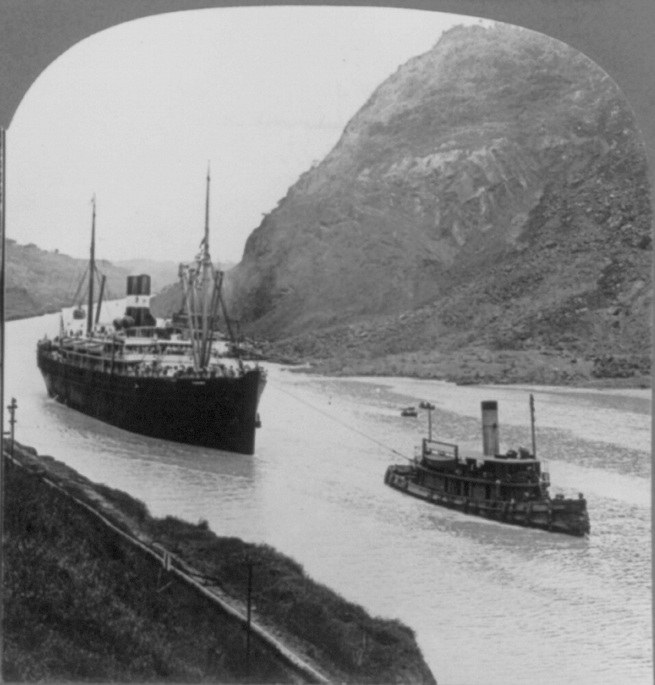
SS Panama in the Culebra Cut on 7 February 1915 – the first excursion to go through the Panama Canal.

Havana was sold to the Panama Railroad Steamship Company on behalf of the Isthmian Canal Commission in 1905. She was renamed SS Panama and would serve a crucial role in the construction of the Panama Canal. The steamship company was already running connecting service with New York and San Francisco. It also ran a Central American line of steamships linking Nicaragua, Costa Rica, San Salvador, and Guatemala to Panama City. The shipping service was greatly expanded as canal construction began. The line's heyday was during the construction period; once the canal was finished in 1914 the service shifted to the business of supporting the maintenance and operation of the canal and its supporting infrastructure, including the railroad.

== Alaska Steamship Company service ==
In February 1927 Panama was sold to the Alaska Steamship Company and transferred to Pacific coastal service. Renamed SS Aleutian after the volcanic Aleutian Islands that stretch westward from the Alaska Peninsula, the vessel received a complete overhaul and refit in Seattle. At this time she likely would have been converted from a coal- to an oil-fired vessel. Contemporary reports described her as palatial and she became the steamship company's flagship. She entered the company's Alaska service carrying freight, passengers and mail service from Seattle.

On 26 May 1929 Aleutian was steaming into Uyak Bay (57.8000°N 154.0667°W) on the coast of Kodiak Island in clear weather with good visibility when she suddenly shook throughout her hull. She had struck a submerged pinnacle rock off the south end of Amook Island (57°25′30″N 153°50′30″W) that had torn into her. She sank just seven minutes after impact. 153 people on board – 39 passengers and 114 crewmen – made it off and survived, but one crew member, Manuel Dorras, was lost, reported to have gone below to retrieve his lucky horseshoe. A small motorboat took a few of the passengers to Larsen Bay, from which a cannery tender known as the Raven was dispatched to pick up the rest of the survivors and bring them to Larsen Bay as well. After all the survivors had reached Larsen Bay, the United States Coast and Geodetic Survey survey ship USC&GS Surveyor met them there and transported them all to Seward in Southcentral Alaska.

== Wreck discovery and conservation ==
Aleutian was thought to have sunk in very deep water and no salvage had been attempted. In 1998 shipwreck historian Steve Lloyd researched the testimony from the Marine Board of Inquiry hearing that had been conducted after the sinking of Aleutian. Reconstructing testimony given by Aleutian's officers he estimated the course of the ship just before the pinnacle rock had inflicted its mortal blow. In 2002 he began a side-scan sonar and a magnetometer search of the sea floor beginning at the rock that had sunk the ship. (The rock was later marked with a navigation aid and named Aleutian Rock to honor the deceased crew member.) On 14 August 2002 the searchers found a metallic target on the seabed. The discovery was confirmed when a diver descended for an inspection. On the bottom, still upright, lay Aleutian. Her wreck is located just off the southern tip of Amook Island, about midway down the length of Uyak Bay at Kodiak Island.

In 2003 Lloyd sought salvage rights to the wreck. "The cargo's still in the hold. The furniture is still in the stateroom ... spittoons still in the gentlemen's smoking room…Portions of the superstructure have collapsed, and almost all the wood is gone. But sections of the deck were steel and are still there." In 2004 the wreck site was placed on the National Register of Historic Places. In December 2005 the state of Alaska and the discoverer's exploration company reached a settlement that would allow artifact recovery in compliance with state's Office of History and Archeology and environmental regulations. Aleutian is slowly deteriorating from the effects of saltwater corrosion and time. Despite the ship's rapid sinking and time underwater she is nonetheless remarkably intact. The depth, current, and low visibility of her resting place makes her accessible only to experienced deep-wreck divers with advanced training and certification.

== See also ==
- National Register of Historic Places listings in Kodiak Island Borough, Alaska
