= Surveyor Bay =

Surveyor Bay may refer to:

- Surveyor Bay (Alaska), a bay on the coast of Unalaska Island in the Aleutian Islands in Alaska in the United States
- Surveyors Bay, Tasmania, a locality and bay on the coast of Tasmania in Australia
