= Native Village of Afognak =

Federally recognized Native American tribe in the United States

- Alaska Native village
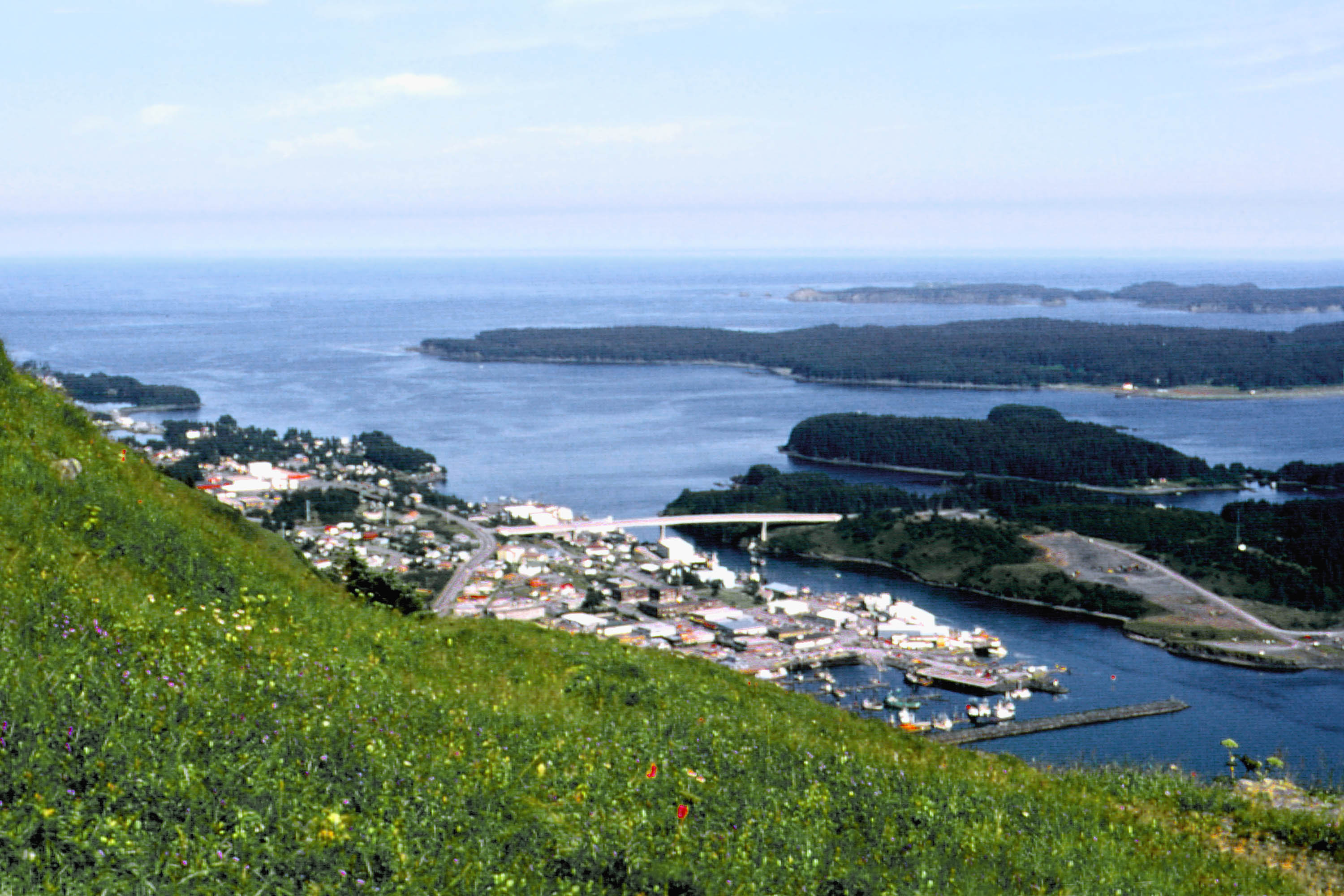
- Aerial view of Kodiak, Alaska

- Native Village of Afognak
- Coordinates: 57°47′21″N 152°24′16″W
- Capital: Kodiak, Alaska

Government
  - Type: Representative democracy
  - Body: Afognak Tribal Council
  - Chairman: Meagan Christiansen

Population
  - Total: Over 800
- Demonym: Afognak Alutiiq
- Time zone: UTC– 09:00 (AKST)
  - Summer (DST): UTC– 08:00 (AKDT)
- Website: afognak.org

The Native Village of Afognak is a federally recognized Alutiiq Alaska Native tribal entity, historically from the island of Afognak. The tribe is headquartered in Kodiak, Alaska, and has over 800 enrolled citizens, who are known as the Afognak Alutiiq or Sugpiat.

== History ==
The history of the Alutiiq goes back more than 7,500 years in the Kodiak Archipelago,. During the late 18th century, the Russian-American Company pressed many of the men of the islands in the area into service hunting otter. This mistreatment and a smallpox epidemic in 1837 led to increased protections from Russia and the imposition of a system of legislated villages, one of which was Afognak.

The village of Afognak was actually a combination of two former villages known simply as Russian Town and Aleut Town, formed through continual contact between the two groups.

=== Alaska Purchase and statehood ===
The United States purchased Alaska in 1867. From that time to Alaska statehood in 1959 and until the earthquake in 1964, the quality of life was much lower for the Village of Afognak. Commercial fishing interfered with local sustenance and employment conditions were often far less than ideal.

=== Earthquake and relocation ===
The Good Friday earthquake of 1964 resulted in the relocation of surviving residents of the village of Ag’waneq on the island of Afognak. A new village, Port Lions (named for the Lions Club who helped construct it), was constructed to house the tribe, but many moved on to Kodiak or elsewhere in the United States or Canada. Those who moved to Port Lions became the Native Village of Port Lions.

== Government ==
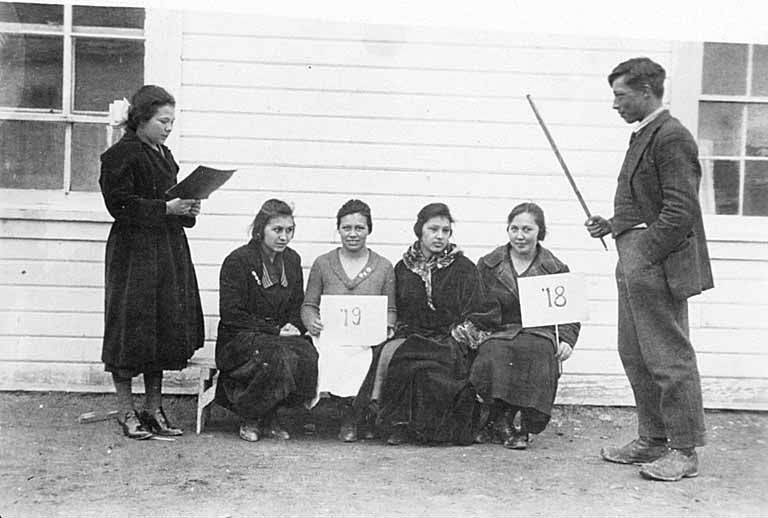
Afognak graduating class sitting outside the school building, Afognak, Alaska, 1918

The Organized Village of Afognak is led by a democratically elected tribal council. Its chairman is Meagan Christiansen. The Alaska Regional Office of the Bureau of Indian Affairs serves the tribe. The tribe is a member of the National Congress of American Indians.

=== Federal recognition ===
In 1971, the Alaska Native Claims Settlement Act resulted in the formation of 13 regional corporations and a number of Native Village Corporations which were recognized by the Bureau of Indian Affairs as tribal entities. The Native Village of Afognak is one such officially designated tribe. The regional Alaska Native Corporation is Koniag, Inc. Many citizens of the Native Village of Afognak also hold shares in one of the region's village corporations, Afognak Native Corporation. Koniag, Inc. and Afognak Native Corporation are distinct legal entities.

=== Tribal council ===
The tribal council of the Native Village of Afognak consists of seven elected members who sit for three-year terms. The council is the official governing body of the tribe as well as managing cultural and land resources and preserving the cultural traditions of the Alutiiq.

== Language and culture ==
The tribe speaks English and Alutiiq, with about 35 fluent speakers. Many tribal elders also speak Alaskan Russian.

== Archeaology ==
In 1993, the Afognak Native Corporation founded Dig Afognak, a hands-on archaeological excavation conducted in the summers. Youth and elders have participated in the excavation of the old Afognak island village of Ag’waneq. In 1998 the Bureau of Indian Affairs issued a grant to fund the collection and preservation of historic and precontact data from the dig and from interviews with Elders of the community.

== Climate change ==
Alaska Natives are already feeling the effects of climate change from increased fires, harsher storms, melting permafrost, erosion along the coasts, and weather patterns shifting. To address these threats, in 2006, 162 Alaska Native tribes, including the Native Village of Afognak, and corporations working with the Native American Rights Fund, signed a Climate Change resolution calling upon Congress to pass laws to reduce greenhouse gas emissions.

== See also ==
- List of Alaska Native Tribal Entities
- Awa'uq Massacre
