= Sts. Sergius and Herman of Valaam Chapel =

Historic church in Alaska, United States

- U.S. National Register of Historic Places
- Alaska Heritage Resources Survey
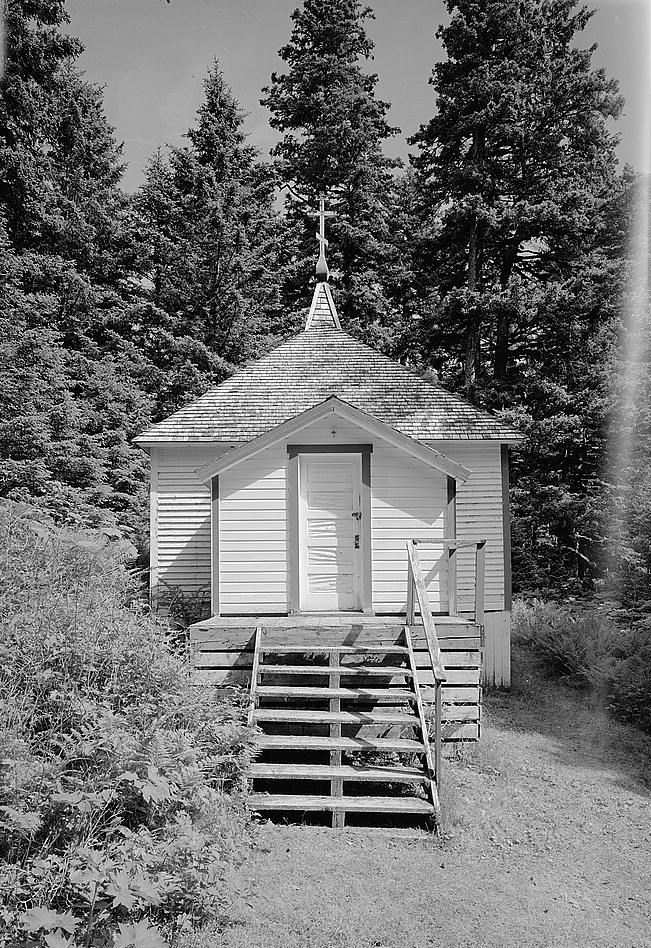
- 1989 HABS photo

- Location within Alaska
- Nearest city: Ouzinkie, Alaska
- Coordinates: 57°54′46.17″N 152°20′34.055″W
- Area: less than one acre
- Built: 1898
- MPS: Russian Orthodox Church Buildings and Sites TR
- NRHP reference No.: 80004581 (Note: There's an error in NRHP listing for this building. Listing 80004581 attached form and pictures refer to Sts. Sergius and Herman of Valaam Church in Nanwalek. The correct form and pictures for this building are attached to listing 80004587.)
- AHRS No.: KOD-196

Significant dates
- Added to NRHP: June 6, 1980
- Designated AHRS: May 18, 1973

Sts. Sergius and Herman of Valaam Chapel (Russian: Св. Сергий и Герман капеллы Валаам) is a historic Russian Orthodox chapel in Ouzinkie, Alaska. The chapel is named for the Saints Sergius and Herman of Valaam. It was built in 1898 by Bishop Tikhon, who located it over the grave of Father Herman, the first Russian Orthodox clergyman to be canonized for service in Alaska, and who has been considered the patron saint of Alaska. It is approximately 22 by 20 feet (6.7 m × 6.1 m) in plan and on its roof has a small, relatively recently added onion-shape supporting a high cross. An altar section and a vestibule section were added later, completing out a customary three-section design of Russian Orthodox churches in Alaska.

The building was added to the National Register of Historic Places in 1980.

== See also ==
- Sts. Sergius and Herman of Valaam Church, in English Bay, Alaska, also NRHP-listed
- National Register of Historic Places listings in Kodiak Island Borough, Alaska
