= Middle Bay Brick Kiln =

Archaeological site in Alaska, United States

- Kodiak 011 Site
- U.S. National Register of Historic Places
- Alaska Heritage Resources Survey
- Location: Address restricted
- Nearest city: Kodiak, Alaska
- Area: less than one acre
- NRHP reference No.: 80004571
- AHRS No.: KOD-011
- Added to NRHP: July 21, 1980

The Middle Bay Brick Kiln is a historical archaeological site on Kodiak Island, Alaska. Located on an eroding bluff face on Middle Bay, the site contains the remains of a brickmaking facility established by the Russian American Company, probably in the early 19th century. The remains include a 4-by-4-meter (13 ft × 13 ft) Roman-style kiln, with a series of arches that supported the kiln floor and provided a space for the fire. At the time of the site's first major excavation in 1979, elements of at least one arch were in danger of being undermined by the eroding bluff face, and were removed for potential reconstruction by the Kodiak Historical Society. Other notable finds at the site include hand cut nails and a brick with Russian writing on it.

The site was listed on the National Register of Historic Places in 1980.

== See also ==
- National Register of Historic Places listings in Kodiak Island Borough, Alaska
