= Fort Abercrombie State Historical Park =

State park in Alaska, United States

- Fort Abercrombie State Historic Site
- U.S. National Register of Historic Places
- U.S. National Historic Landmark
- Alaska Heritage Resources Survey
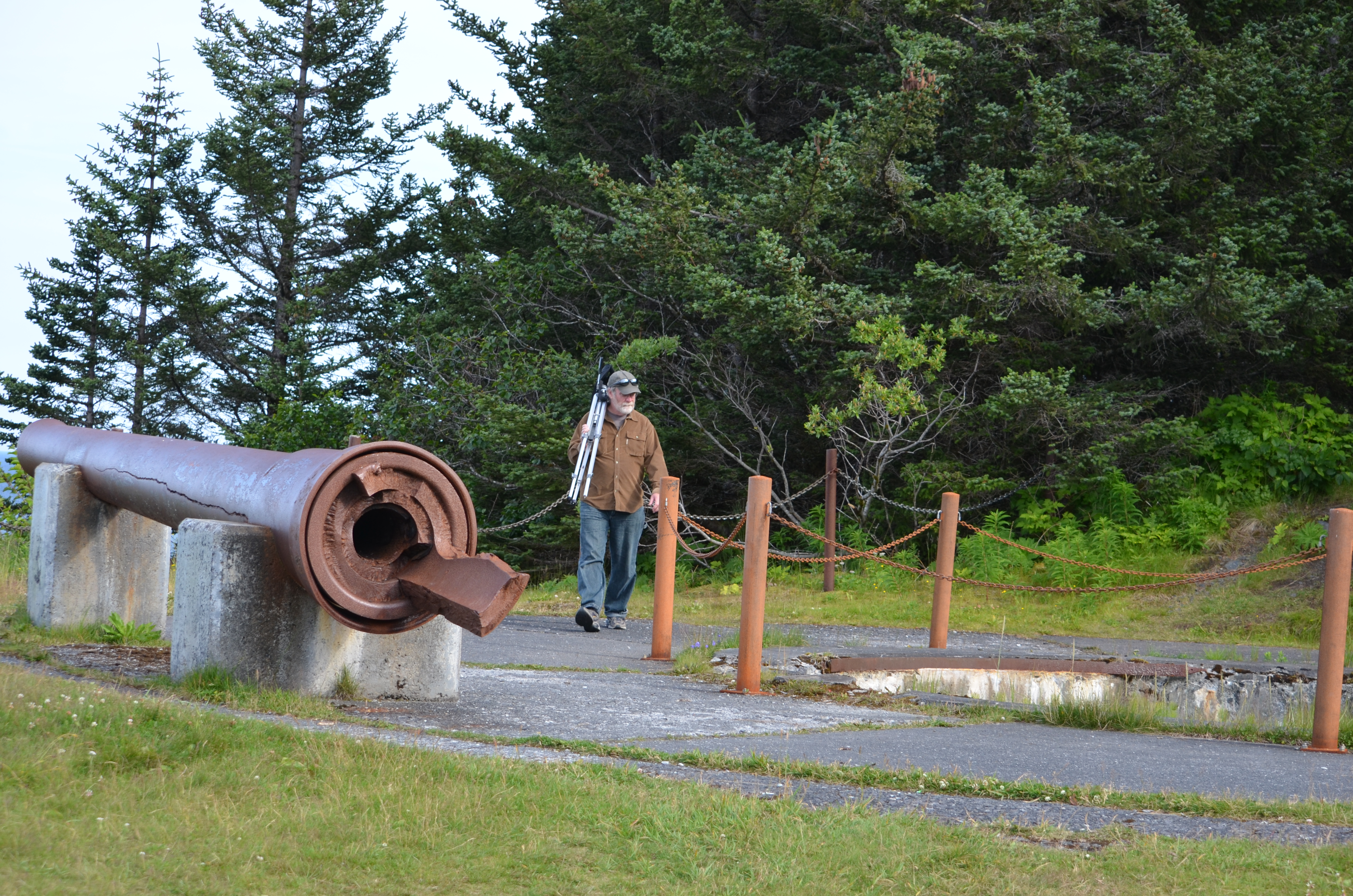
- Miller Point gun emplacement

- Location within Alaska
- Location: Miller Point, about 5 miles (8.0 km) from Kodiak, Alaska
- Coordinates: 57°49′52″N 152°21′21″W
- Built: 1941
- NRHP reference No.: 70000917
- AHRS No.: KOD-137

Significant dates
- Added to NRHP: October 27, 1970
- Designated NHL: February 4, 1985

Fort Abercrombie State Historical Park, also known as the Fort Abercrombie State Historic Site, is an Alaska state park on Kodiak Island, Alaska. It includes 182 acres (74 ha) of land at the end of Miller Point, located on the eastern shore of Kodiak Island northeast of the city of Kodiak. The park, established in 1969, is noted for its historical World War II fortifications and its scenery, which includes bluffs overlooking the ocean, spruce forests, and meadows. The site was named in honor of the early Alaska explorer and United States Army officer Lt. Col. William R. Abercrombie. The fortifications, whose surviving elements include gun emplacements, underground magazines, and foundational remnants of buildings, were built in 1941 and abandoned after the war ended, having seen no action.

The park was listed on the National Register of Historic Places in 1970, and was included in the National Historic Landmark designation of the Kodiak Naval Operating Base and Forts Greely and Abercrombie in 1985.

Park facilities include a campground, a group camping area, a picnic area, and hiking trails.

== Kodiak Military History Museum ==
The Kodiak Military History Museum is a private military museum located in Fort Abercrombie State Historical Park. The museum is located in the restored Ready Ammunition bunker on Miller Point.

== See also ==
- National Register of Historic Places listings in Kodiak Island Borough, Alaska
- List of National Historic Landmarks in Alaska
