= Kad'yak =

- U.S. National Register of Historic Places
- Location: Address restricted
- Nearest city: Kodiak, Alaska
- Area: 2 acres (0.81 ha)
- Built: 1860
- Built by: Hans Jacob Albrecht Meyer
- Architectural style: 19th century Barque
- NRHP reference No.: 04000678
- Added to NRHP: July 14, 2004

The Kad'yak, also known as Kadyak and Kadiak, was a wooden-hulled sailing merchant ship belonging to the Russian-American Company. Purchased by the company in 1851, she was used to transport personnel and supplies among its settlements in Russian Alaska, and to transport trade goods to San Francisco. On April 2, 1860, she struck a rock near the port of Kodiak, Alaska while carrying a load of ice and trade goods destined for San Francisco, and sank near Spruce Island after drifting for three days.

The shipwreck was discovered in 2003, and listed on the National Register of Historic Places in 2004. It was at that time the only known shipwreck associated with the Russian era in Alaska.

== See also ==
- National Register of Historic Places listings in Kodiak Island Borough, Alaska
