= Surveyors Bay =

- Town
- Coordinates: 43°16′47″S 147°05′23″E
- Country: Australia
- State: Tasmania
- Region: South-east
- LGA: Huon Valley
- Location: 43 km (27 mi) S of Huonville

Government
  - State electorate: Franklin
  - Federal division: Franklin

Population
  - Total: 47 (2016 census)
- Postcode: 7116
Localities around Surveyors Bay
| Police Point | Police Point | Huon River |
| Dover | Surveyors Bay | Huon River estuary |
| Dover | Dover | Huon River |

For other places with the same name, see Surveyor Bay (disambiguation)

Surveyors Bay is a rural locality and a bay in the local government area (LGA) of Huon Valley in the South-east LGA region of Tasmania. The locality is about 43 kilometres (27 mi) south of the town of Huonville. The 2016 census recorded a population of 47 for the state suburb of Surveyors Bay.

== History ==
The area was formerly known as Camden, but by 1899 was renamed. Surveyors Bay was gazetted as a locality in 1971.

== Geography ==
The waters of the Huon River estuary form the north-east to south-east boundaries.

== Road infrastructure ==
Route C638 (Esperance Coast Road) enters from the north-east and runs through to the south-east, where it exits.
