= Cape Alitak =

Coordinates: 56°50′36″N 154°18′33″W

- Cape Alitak Petroglyphs District
- U.S. National Register of Historic Places
- U.S. Historic district
- Location within Alaska
- Location: Address restricted
- Nearest city: Akhiok, Alaska
- NRHP reference No.: 13000139
- Added to NRHP: April 9, 2013

Cape Alitak is a finger of land on the south side of Kodiak Island, the major island of the Kodiak Archipelago of southern Alaska. The cape is an extension of Tanner Head, from which it is separated (except for a barrier beach on the west) by Rodman Reach, a saltwater lagoon. The cape is bounded on the east by Alitak Bay, on the west by the southern end of Shelikof Strait, and on the south by Sitkinak Strait, which separates Kodiak Island from the Trinity Islands. The cape has long been known its remarkable collection of prehistoric petroglyphs, which include a wide variety of shapes, some of animals and humans, and others of apparently abstract geometric figures. The cape was surveyed in detail in 2011 by archaeologists from the Alutiiq Museum in Kodiak, at which time thirteen different petroglyph locations were identified, along with evidence of prehistoric habitation of the area. The petroglyph site were listed on the National Register of Historic Places in 2013.

== See also ==
- National Register of Historic Places listings in Kodiak Island Borough, Alaska
