= American Cemetery =

Historic cemetery in Kodiak, Alaska

- U.S. National Register of Historic Places
- Alaska Heritage Resources Survey
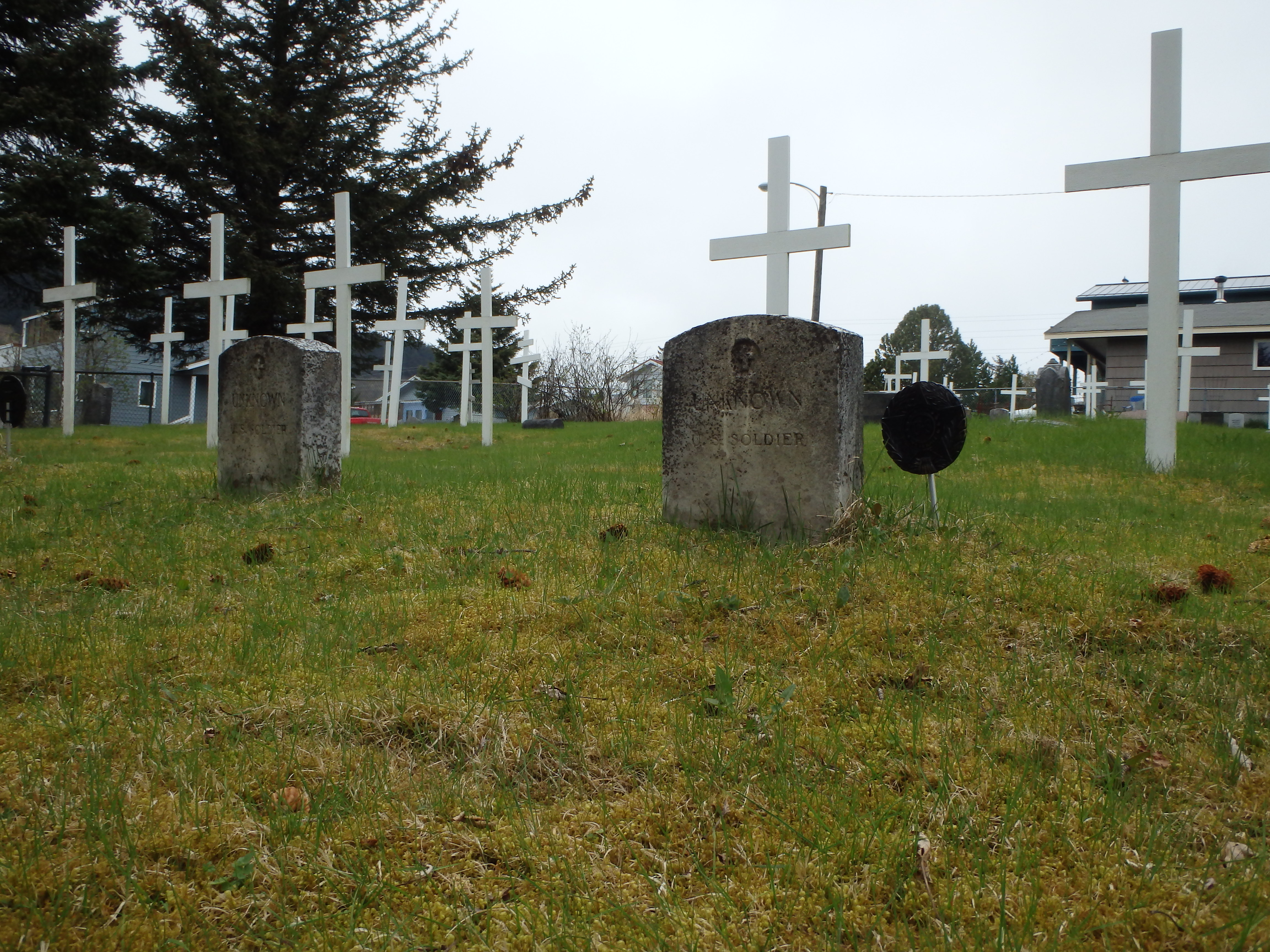

- Location within Alaska
- Location: Upper Mill Bay Road, Kodiak, Alaska
- Coordinates: 57°47′28″N 152°24′5″W
- Area: 0.35 acres (0.14 ha)
- Built: 1868
- Built by: US Army
- NRHP reference No.: 80004570
- AHRS No.: KOD-132

Significant dates
- Added to NRHP: April 10, 1980
- Designated AHRS: June 30, 1974

The American Cemetery, also known as the Old City Cemetery, is a historic cemetery on Upper Mill Bay Road in Kodiak, Alaska. It is a small parcel of land near the intersection with Wilson Avenue, about one third of an acre, now completely surrounded by buildings. It was established in 1868 by the United States Army, not long after occupying the formerly Russian community after the Alaska Purchase, and is the second-oldest cemetery (after the one established by the Russians) in the city. The cemetery was used by the military and later the community until 1940. At least seven soldiers, including five from the original occupation of Fort Kodiak, are known to be buried here.

The cemetery was listed on the National Register of Historic Places in 1980.

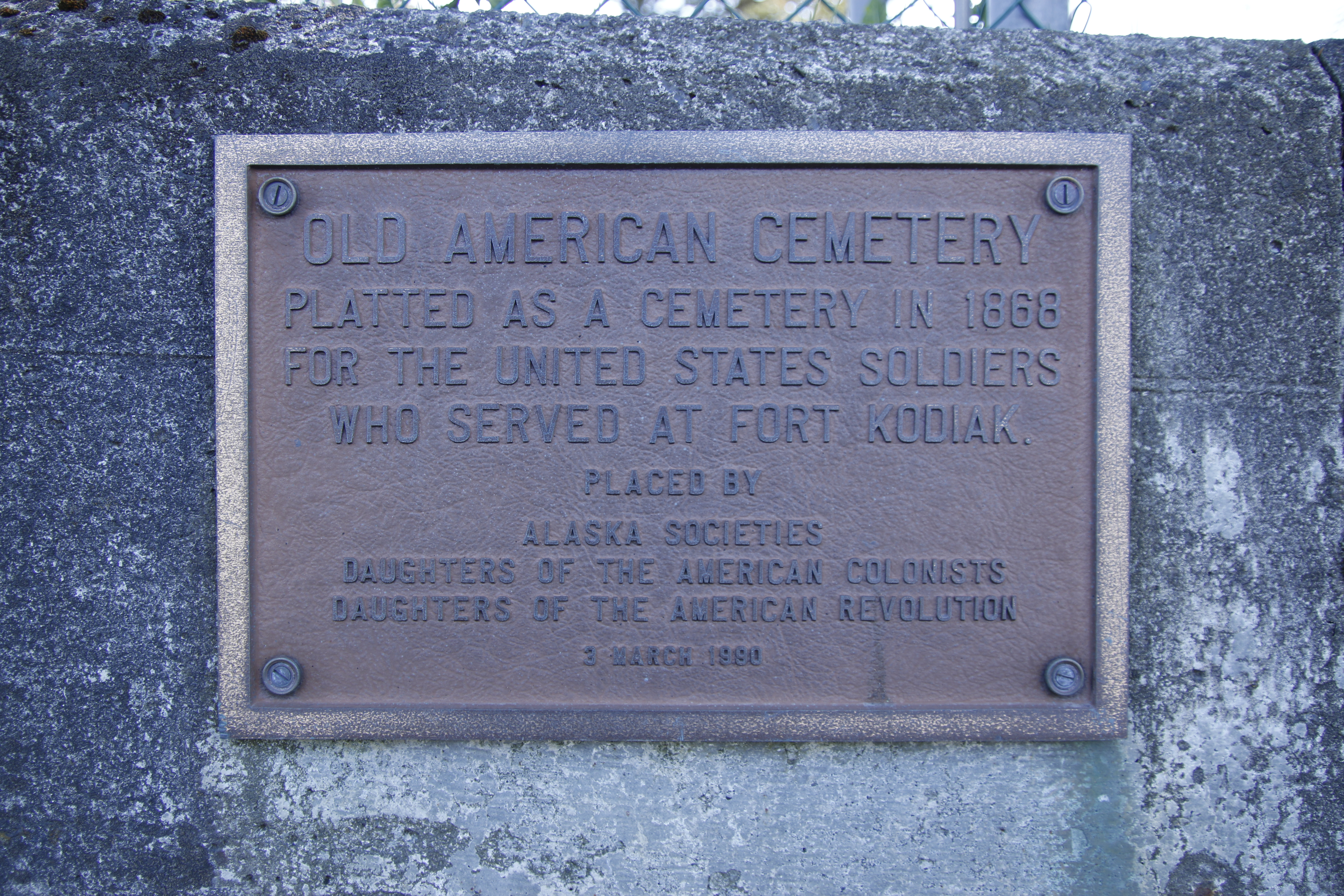
Nameplate for American Cemetery, Kodiak, Alaska

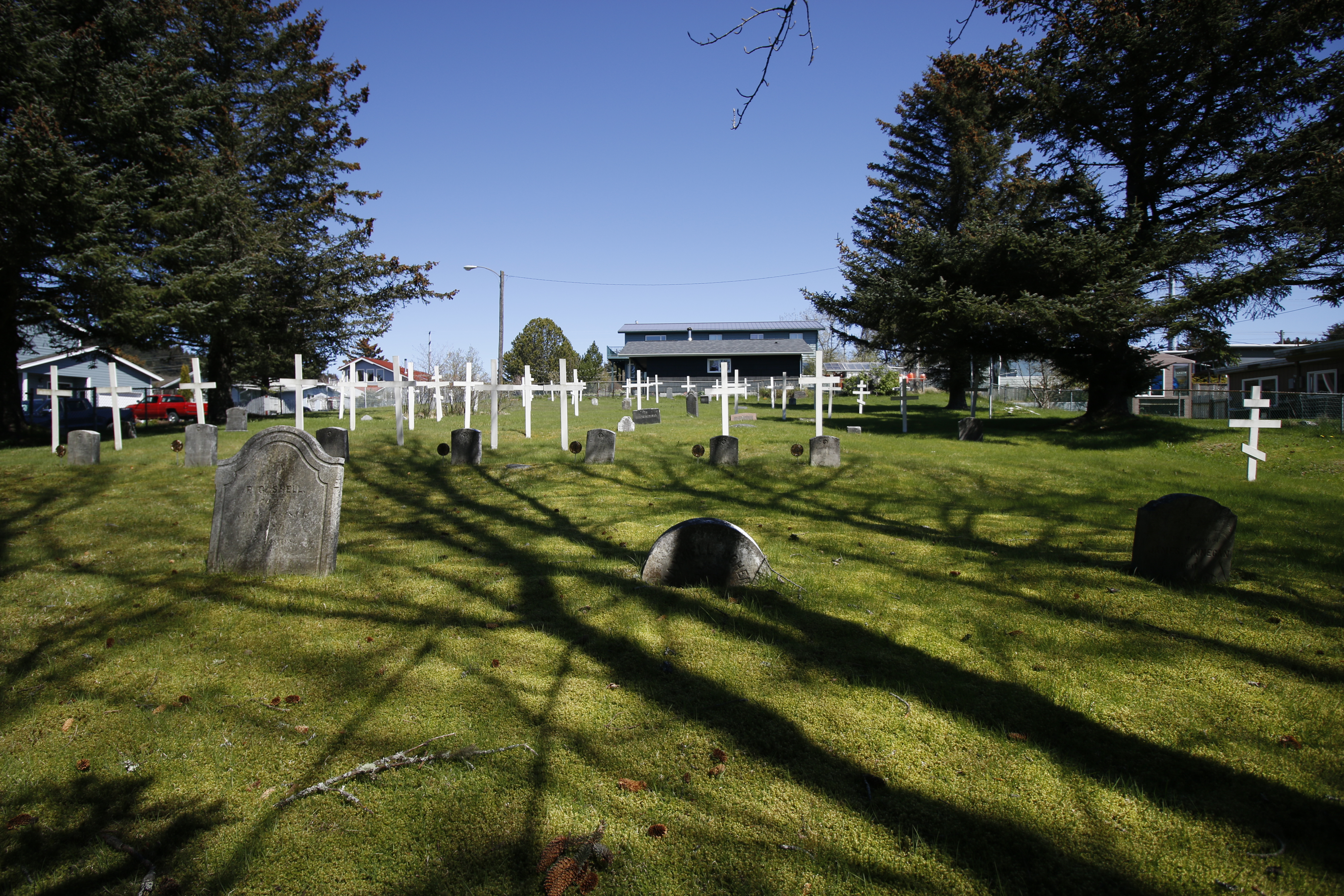
Wide angle view of American Cemetery, Kodiak, Alaska.

== See also ==
- National Register of Historic Places listings in Kodiak Island Borough, Alaska
