= Coast Guard Base Kodiak =

US Coast Guard base in Kodiak, Alaska

- Kodiak Naval Operating Base and Forts Greely and Abercrombie
- U.S. National Register of Historic Places
- U.S. National Historic Landmark
- Alaska Heritage Resources Survey
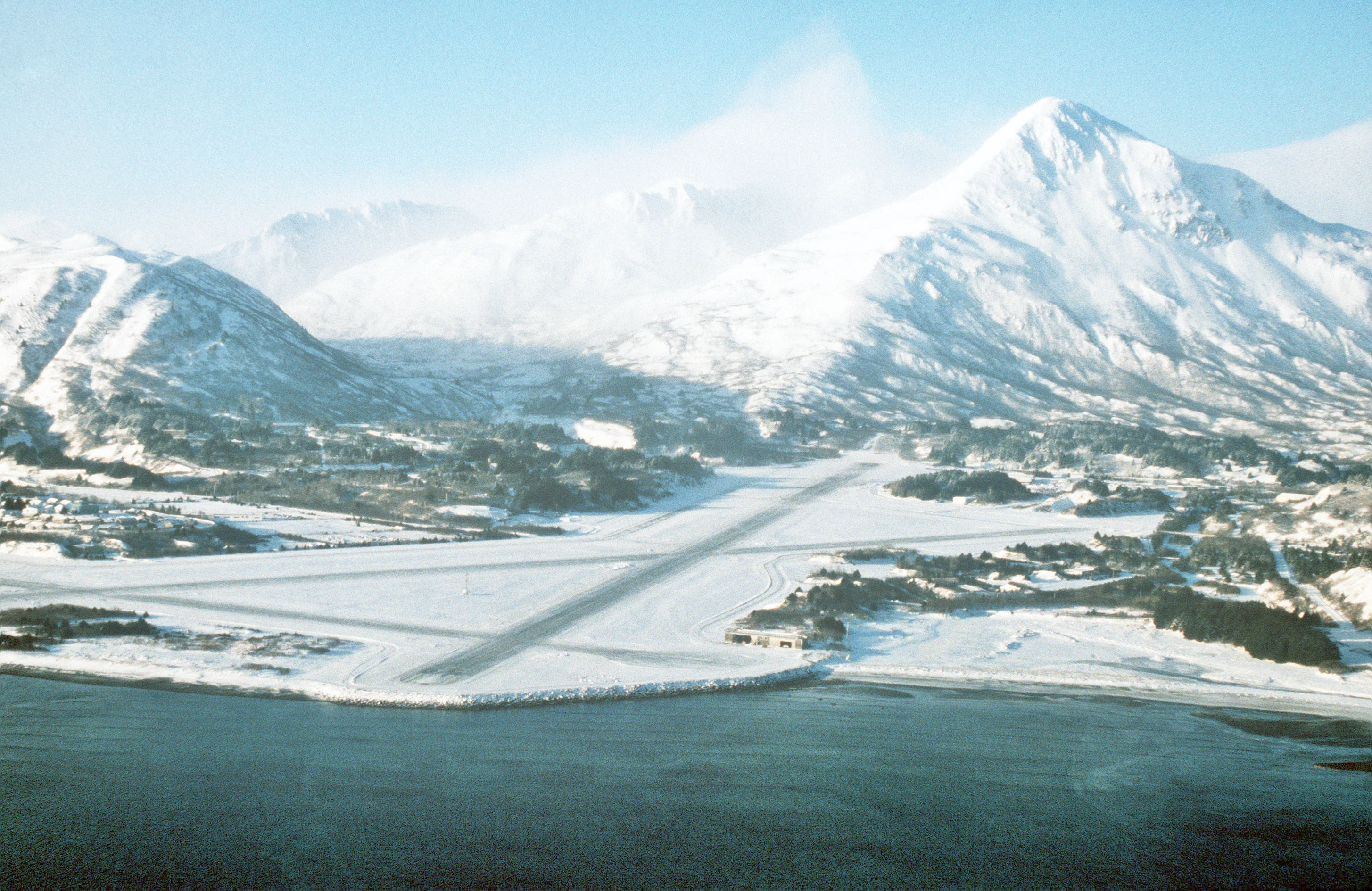
- Kodiak Air Station, January 1989

- Location within Alaska
- Location: Kodiak Station, Kodiak Island Borough, Alaska
- Nearest city: Kodiak, Alaska
- Coordinates: 57°44′19″N 152°30′17″W
- Area: 3,000 acres (1,200 ha)
- Built: 1941
- NRHP reference No.: 85002731
- AHRS No.: KOD-124; KOD-137 (Note: Kodiak Naval Base and Fort Greely were enlisted as a single entry in Alaska Heritage Resources Survey as KOD-124. Fort Abercrombie was enlisted in Alaska Heritage Resources Survey as KOD-137.)

Significant dates
- Added to NRHP: February 4, 1985
- Designated NHL: February 4, 1985

Coast Guard Base Kodiak is a major shore installation of the United States Coast Guard, located in Kodiak, Alaska. The largest tenant unit on the base is Air Station Kodiak. It is also the home port for several cutters. Historic elements that it includes are the Kodiak Naval Operating Base, Fort Greely, and Fort Abercrombie.

The station is the subject of the series Coast Guard Alaska on The Weather Channel and is prominently featured in the 2006 film The Guardian and is frequently referenced in the Discovery Channel series Deadliest Catch.

== History ==
The base began as the United States Navy's Naval Air Station Kodiak on June 15, 1941. Artillery emplacements survive on Buskin Hill, Artillery Hill, and at Fort Abercrombie (now a state park), but little remains of Fort Greely's barracks.

On April 17, 1947 the Coast Guard Air Station was commissioned as an Air Detachment at the navy base with one PBY Catalina aircraft, seven pilots, and thirty crewmen. On April 25, 1972 the order establishing Coast Guard Base Kodiak and CG RADSTA Kodiak was issued by the Commandant of the CG. CG Air Station Kodiak was already operating with three HC-130H airplanes and two HH-52A helicopters. Today, CG Air Station Kodiak operates five HC-130J aircraft, five MH-60T Jayhawk helicopters, and five MH-65C Dolphin helicopters.

Kodiak Naval Operating Base, Fort Greely, and Fort Abercrombie were together listed on the National Register of Historic Places and also declared to be a National Historic Landmark in 1985 for the role the facilities played in World War II.

=== 2012 shooting ===
On April 12, 2012, two Coast Guard members were found fatally shot at their work stations in one of the communications buildings on-base. The event caused panic on the island as residents were urged to stay indoors and report suspect activities, and schools were put on lockdown. After an investigation conducted by the FBI, Coast Guard Investigative Service, and Alaska State Troopers, the prime suspect (James Michael "Jim" Wells) was arrested.

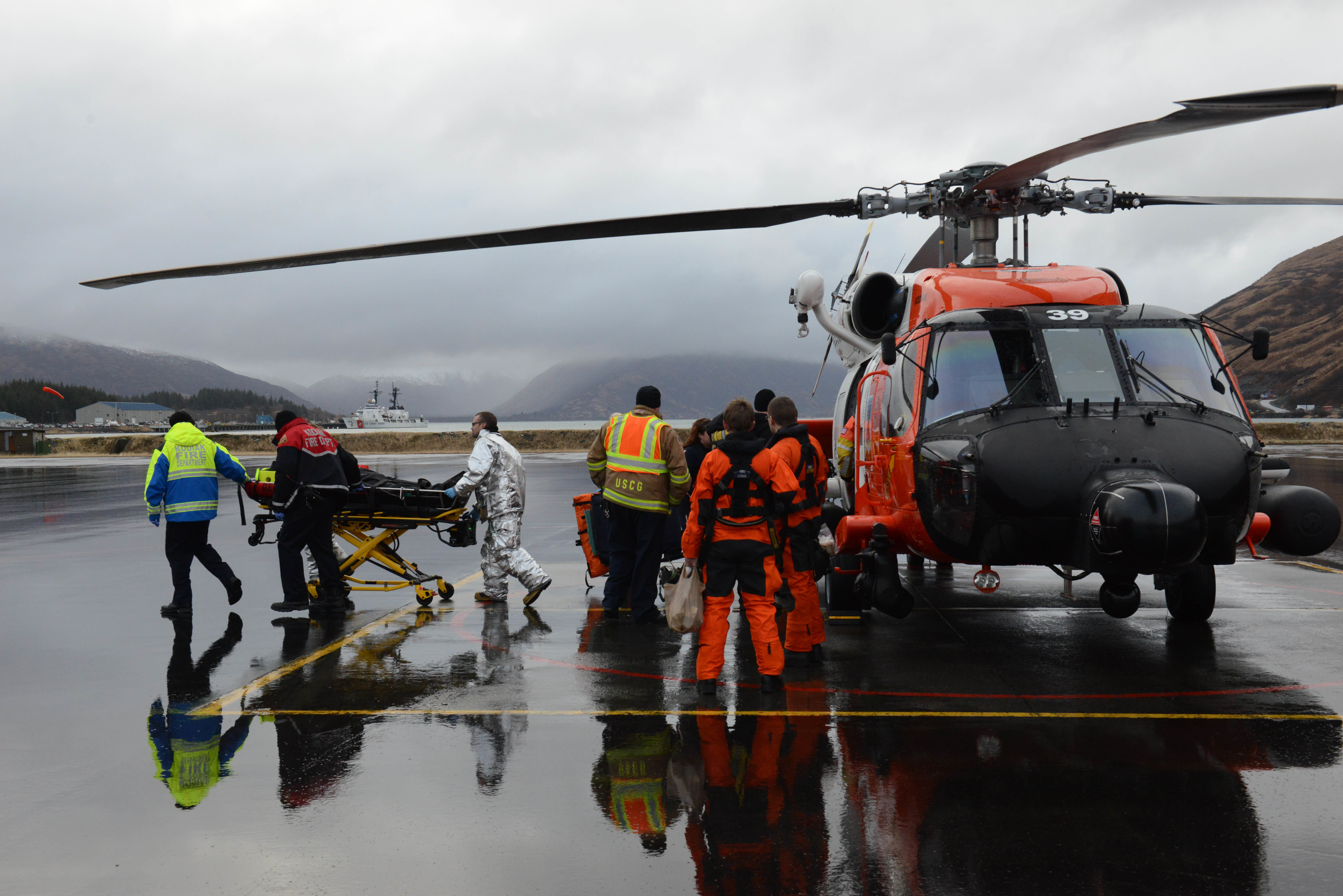
An injured person is transferred to awaiting emergency medical services personnel at Air Station Kodiak

== Homeported cutters ==
- USCGC Alex Haley (WMEC-39)
- USCGC Cypress (WLB-210)
- USCGC John Witherspoon (WPC-1158)
- USCGC Earl Cunningham (WPC-1159)
- USCGC Frederick Mann (WPC-1160) Until accommodations are made for a permanent homeport in Seward, AK

== See also ==
- Fort Abercrombie State Historical Park
- Naval Special Warfare Cold Weather Detachment Kodiak
- List of National Historic Landmarks in Alaska
- National Register of Historic Places listings in Kodiak Island Borough, Alaska
