= Russian Kiln Site =

Archaeological site in Alaska, United States

- AHRS Site KOD-207
- U.S. National Register of Historic Places
- Alaska Heritage Resources Survey
- Location: Address restricted
- Nearest city: Kodiak, Alaska
- Area: less than one acre
- NRHP reference No.: 78003428
- AHRS No.: KOD-207
- Added to NRHP: December 1, 1978

The Russian Kiln Site is a historic archaeological site on Long Island, part of the Kodiak Archipelago of southern Alaska. It is one of the oldest industrial sites in Alaska, established by the Russian American Company for the production of bricks, an otherwise rare commodity in 19th-century Russian America. The kilns on the site were reported to produce between 3000 and 6000 bricks annually. Brick debris is scattered along the shore of Long Island in the area, which subsided after the 1964 Alaska earthquake and is subject to erosion. It is one of several sites in the vicinity of Kodiak Island where the Russians produced bricks.

The site was listed on the National Register of Historic Places in 1978.

== See also ==
- National Register of Historic Places listings in Kodiak Island Borough, Alaska
