= Holy Resurrection Church (Kodiak, Alaska) =

Historic church in Alaska, United States

- U.S. National Register of Historic Places
- Alaska Heritage Resources Survey
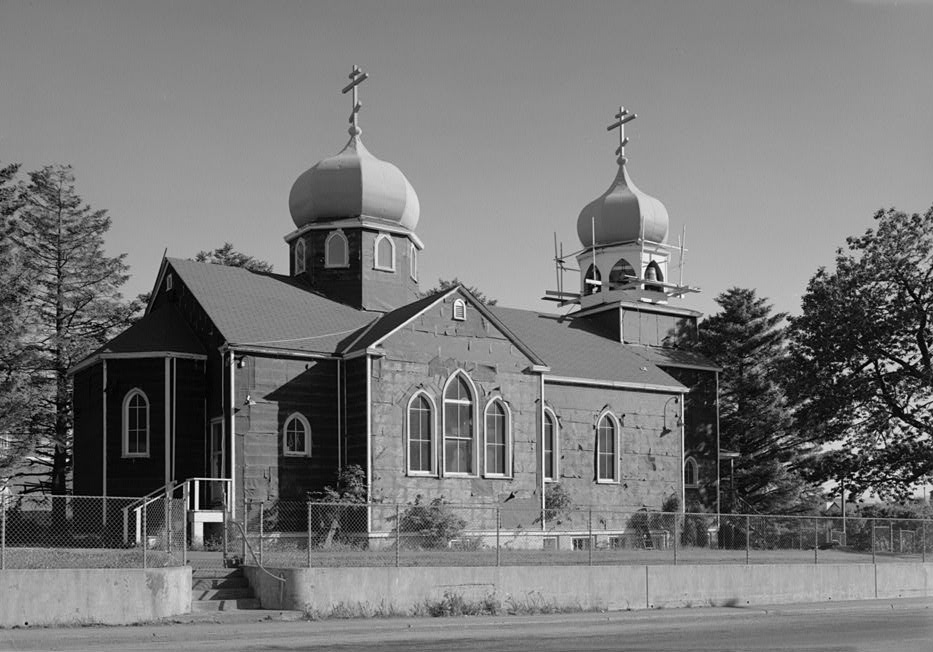

- Location within Alaska
- Location: Corner of Mission Road and Kashevaroff Avenue, Kodiak, Alaska
- Coordinates: 57°47′19″N 152°24′9″W
- Area: less than one acre
- Built: 1945
- Built by: Ralph Shupp
- MPS: Russian Orthodox Church Buildings and Sites TR (AD)
- NRHP reference No.: 77001574
- AHRS No.: KOD-195

Significant dates
- Added to NRHP: December 12, 1977
- Designated AHRS: May 18, 1973

The Holy Resurrection Church (Russian: Свято-Воскресенская Церковь) is a historic Russian Orthodox church located at the corner of Mission Road and Kashevaroff Avenue in Kodiak, Alaska. It is now part of the Diocese of Alaska of the Orthodox Church in America.

It was built in 1945 as a replacement to a previous building that burnt in 1943. The Russian Orthodox presence in Kodiak dates from 1794, not long after the settlement's founding. The current church is about 70 by 30 feet (21.3 m × 9.1 m) in plan dimensions.

The church building was added to the National Register of Historic Places in 1977. The listing also includes a detached bell tower which is believed to be 19th century in construction.

== See also ==
- National Register of Historic Places listings in Kodiak Island Borough, Alaska
