= Agricultural Experiment Station Barn =

Historic barn in Kodiak, Alaska, U.S.

- U.S. National Register of Historic Places
- Alaska Heritage Resources Survey
- Location within Alaska
- Location: 614 Egan Way, Kodiak, Alaska
- Coordinates: 57°47′32″N 152°23′51″W
- Area: less than one acre
- Built: 1922
- NRHP reference No.: 04000716
- AHRS No.: KOD-00459
- Added to NRHP: July 21, 2004

The Agricultural Experiment Station Barn is a historic barn at 614 Egan Way in Kodiak, Alaska. Built in 1922, it is the last remaining structure of an agricultural experiment station established by the United States in 1907 and operated until 1931, determining that the local climate was viable for raising dairy cattle. It is built in the style of a Wisconsin dairy barn, with post and beam framing, vertical siding, and a concrete foundation.

The barn was listed on the National Register of Historic Places in 2004. At that time it was used by a variety of local government agencies as office space and storage.

== See also ==
- National Register of Historic Places listings in Kodiak Island Borough, Alaska
