= Aleneva, Alaska =

- Census-designated place
- Location within the state of Alaska
- Coordinates: 58°3′49″N 152°54′37″W
- Country: United States
- State: Alaska
- Borough: Kodiak Island

Government
  - Borough mayor: Jerrol Friend
  - State senator: Gary Stevens (R)
  - State rep.: Louise Stutes (R)

Area
  - Total: 62.21 sq mi (161.12 km^{2})
  - Land: 62.21 sq mi (161.12 km^{2})
  - Water: 0 sq mi (0.00 km^{2})
- Elevation: 620 ft (189 m)

Population (2020)
  - Total: 5
  - Density: 0.078/sq mi (0.03/km^{2})
- Time zone: UTC-9 (Alaska (AKST))
  - Summer (DST): UTC-8 (AKDT)
- Area code: 907
- FIPS code: 02-01560
- GNIS feature ID: 1865543

Aleneva (Russian: Аленева is a census-designated place in the Kodiak Island Borough in the U.S. state of Alaska. As of the 2020 census, the population was 5, down from 37 in the 2010 census.

== Geography and climate ==
Aleneva is located at 58°00′51″N 152°54′34″W (Sec. 18, T025S, R022W, Seward Meridian) in the Kodiak Recording District.

Aleneva is located on the southern coast of the island of Afognak, north of Kodiak Island. It is on the coast of Raspberry Strait, across from Little Raspberry Island.

The Kodiak Archipelago is warmed by the Japanese current. The climate is similar to Southeast Alaska, with less precipitation. January temperatures range from 14 to 46 °F (−10 to 8 °C). July temperatures range from 39 to 76 °F (4 to 24 °C). Average annual rainfall is 74 inches (187.96 cm).

According to the United States Census Bureau, the CDP has a total area of 62.2 square miles (161.1 km^{2}), all land.

== History ==
Aleneva is a settlement of Russian Old Believers whose ancestors settled in Woodburn, Oregon, after the October Revolution forced them out of Russia.

The population consists of 1.5% Alaska Native or part Native. During the 2000 census, total housing units numbered 14, of which none were vacant. 2000 census data showed 21 residents as employed. The unemployment rate at that time was zero, although half of all adults were not in the work force. The median household income was $10,417 and the per capita income was $3,707, making Aleneva the place in Alaska with the lowest per capita income. 40.66% of residents were living below the poverty level.

== Demographics ==
Historical population
| Census | Pop. | Note | %± |
|---|---|---|---|
| 2000 | 68 | | — |
| 2010 | 37 | | −45.6% |
| 2020 | 5 | | −86.5% |
U.S. Decennial Census

Aleneva first appeared on the 2000 U.S. Census as a census-designated place (CDP). Within its present boundaries is the former historic community of Afognak.

As of the census of 2000, there were 68 people, 14 households, and 13 families residing in the CDP. The population density was 1.1 inhabitants per square mile (0.42/km^{2}). There were 14 housing units at an average density of 0.2 per square mile (0.077/km^{2}). The racial makeup of the CDP was 98.53% White and 1.47% Native American.

There were 14 households, out of which 57.1% had children under the age of 18 living with them, 92.9% were married couples living together, and 7.1% were non-families. No households were made up of individuals, and none had someone living alone who was 65 years of age or older. The average household size was 4.86 and the average family size was 5.08.

In the CDP, the population was spread out, with 52.9% under the age of 18, 14.7% from 18 to 24, 17.6% from 25 to 44, 10.3% from 45 to 64, and 4.4% who were 65 years of age or older. The median age was 17 years. For every 100 females, there were 119.4 males. For every 100 females age 18 and over, there were 88.2 males.

The median income for a household in the CDP was $10,417, and the median income for a family was $10,417. Males had a median income of $0 versus $0 for females. The per capita income for the CDP was $3,707. There were 47.6% of families and 40.7% of the population living below the poverty line, including 30.6% of under 18 and 25.0% of those over 64.

== Facilities, utilities, schools and health care ==
There are no public facilities or services on the island. Electricity is provided by individual generators. There are no state-operated schools in the community.

== Economy and transportation ==
There are a few small logging camps on Afognak Island, but no other source of employment. The economy is based on subsistence activities.

Transportation is provided by float plane from Kodiak.

Taxes: Sales: None, Property: 9.25 mills (Borough), Special: 5% Accommodations Tax (Borough); 0.925% Severance Tax (Borough)

== Regional organizations ==
- Borough - Kodiak Island Borough
- Regional Development - Southwest Alaska Muni. Conf.
