= Agivavik, Alaska =

- Ghost Town
- Location in the U.S. state of Alaska
- Coordinates: 59°22′55″N 157°24′13″W
- Country: United States
- State: Alaska
- Census Area: Bethel
- Elevation: 27 m (89 ft)
- Time zone: UTC-9 (Alaska (AKST))
  - Summer (DST): UTC-8 (AKDT)
- Area code: 907
- GNIS feature ID: 1893191

Agivavik is a former Yupik settlement and ghost town in Dillingham Census Area, Alaska, United States. It was located on the west bank of the Nushagak River. The site is approximately 6 miles southwest of the city of New Stuyahok and 3 miles northeast of the city of Ekwok. It was initially noted by the Nushagak Russian Orthodox Church vital statistics in 1863 and was visited by a missionary. In 1879, it was noted to have 47 residents. A Father Vasili Shishkin visited the settlement in 1882 and noted it was "one of only three" occupied villages along the river. The 1880 census did not mention the number of homes occupied, though the 1890 census stated there were two (surveyed by A.B. Schanz).

Agivavik would not be mentioned again until noted anthropologist Aleš Hrdlička in his survey of Alaska, visited the site in 1931 and was told by his guide that the village had been abandoned around 1900. Reports and maps had erroneously placed the location of the village on the wrong side of the river or in the wrong location entirely. Orth's Dictionary of Alaska Place Names, which was also referenced by the USGS, also was in error in its location, noting it to be along the "right bank of the Ugashik River."

James Vanstone noted in "Historic Settlement Patterns in the Nushagak River Region" that this settlement had also been occupied in prehistoric times.

== Demographics ==
Historical population
Census	Pop.	Note	%±
1880	52		—
1890	30		−42.3%
U.S. Decennial Census

Agivavik first appeared on the 1880 U.S. Census as an unincorporated Yupik village with 52 residents, all Inuit. It appeared again on the 1890 census with 30 residents, 2 homes and 6 families (all native). Owing to its abandonment around 1900, it has not appeared again on the census.
