= Aguikchuk, Alaska =

- Ghost Town
- Location in the U.S. state of Alaska
- Coordinates: 60°28′28″N 164°26′07″W
- Country: United States
- State: Alaska
- Census Area: Bethel
- Elevation: 3 m (9.8 ft)
- Time zone: UTC-9 (Alaska (AKST))
  - Summer (DST): UTC-8 (AKDT)
- Area code: 907
- GNIS feature ID: 1893190

Aguikchuk is a former Yup'ik settlement and ghost town in Bethel Census Area, Alaska, United States. It was located on east bank of Kolavinarak River. The site is approximately 10 miles east of the city of Nightmute. It was visited by E. W. Nelson, U.S. Signal Service in December 1878, its name reported by him was "Agiukchugamute," that is, "people of Agiukchuk." It was last noted on the census of 1940, although the U.S. Coast and Geodetic Survey (USC&GS) reported in 1949 that the village was abandoned and the site, often used for a fish camp, is now called "Monrak" or "Monroke." However, the 1954 USGS topographical map of Aguikchuk (Baird Inlet quadrangle) showed these as two separate places, with the site of "Monrak" being a mile to the north. Present aerial maps show there is nothing left at the site as of 2019, though it is still labeled as Aguikchuk on Google Maps.

== Demographics ==
Historical population
Census	Pop.	Note	%±
1880	35		—
1940	65		—
U.S. Decennial Census

Aguikchuk first appeared on the 1880 U.S. Census as the Yup'ik village of "Agiukchugamute" with 35 residents, all Yup'ik. It did not appear on the census again until 1940, when it reported as Aguikchuk. It has not reported on the census again since.
