= Surveyor Bay (Alaska) =

Bay in Alaska, United States

Coordinates: 53°15′41″N 167°34′02″W

Surveyor Bay is a bay in Alaska in the United States.

Surveyor Bay is located on the southeast coast of Unalaska Island, one of the Aleutian Islands. It lies on the west side of Cape Aiak, and is about four nautical miles (7.4 kilometers) wide and two nautical miles (3.7 km) deep at its head.

Politically, the bay lies in Alaska's Aleutians West Census Area, a part of the Unorganized Borough.

The bay was named for a survey ship of the United States Coast and Geodetic Survey, Surveyor, which spent her career operating almost exclusively in the waters of the Territory of Alaska from 1919 to 1956.
