= Sts. Sergius and Herman of Valaam Church =

Historic church in Alaska, United States

- U.S. National Register of Historic Places
- Alaska Heritage Resources Survey
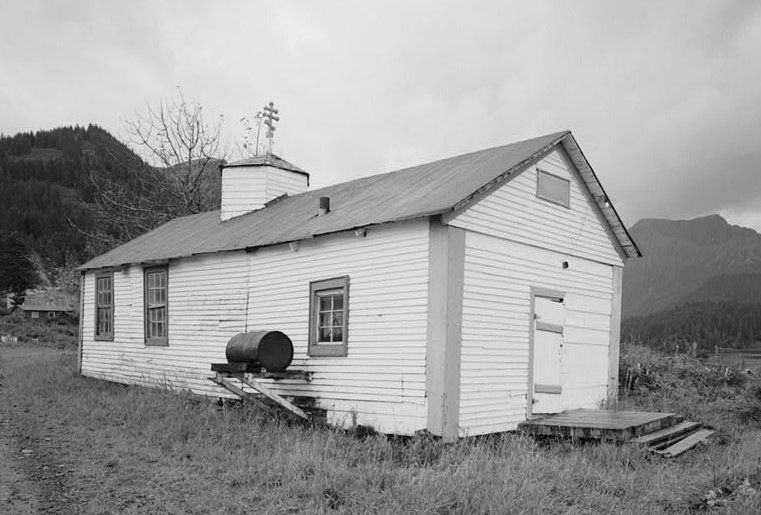

- Location within Alaska
- Location: Nicholas Street, Nanwalek, Alaska
- Coordinates: 59°21′22.8″N 151°55′18″W
- Area: less than one acre
- Built: c. 1930
- MPS: Russian Orthodox Church Buildings and Sites TR
- NRHP reference No.: 80004587 (Note: There's an error in NRHP listing for this building. Listing 80004587 attached form and pictures refer to Sts. Sergius and Herman of Valaam Chapel in Ouzinkie. The correct form and pictures for this building are attached to listing 80004581.)
- AHRS No.: SEL-018

Significant dates
- Added to NRHP: June 6, 1980
- Designated AHRS: May 18, 1973

Sts. Sergius and Herman of Valaam Church is a historic Russian Orthodox church in Nanwalek, Alaska. It is named for the Saints Sergius and Herman of Valaam. It is now under Diocese of Alaska of the Orthodox Church in America.

The settlement (first known as Alexandrovsk, and later as English Bay) was established during 1784–86 but its first church building was not built until about 1870. The current church building was built in about 1930 or before, and has been described as "a study in economical use of existing materials" and as having "no architectural distinction". It consists of two small rectangular buildings joined together; the nave section was possibly once a dance hall and the altar section was possibly once part of a local store. It is argued nonetheless that the building "is an unusual example of adaptive use, and retains the integrity of its use over the past half century as the community R.O. church".

The building was added to the National Register of Historic Places in 1980.

== See also ==
- Sts. Sergius and Herman of Valaam Chapel, in Ouzinkie, Alaska, also NRHP-listed
- National Register of Historic Places listings in Kenai Peninsula Borough, Alaska
