= Arolik, Alaska =

- Ghost Town
- Location in the U.S. state of Alaska
- Coordinates: 59°41′59″N 161°52′35″W
- Country: United States
- State: Alaska
- Census Area: Bethel
- Elevation: 1 m (3.3 ft)
- Time zone: UTC-9 (Alaska (AKST))
  - Summer (DST): UTC-8 (AKDT)
- Area code: 907
- GNIS feature ID: 1398398

Arolik is a former Yup'ik settlement and ghost town in Bethel Census Area, Alaska, United States. It was located at the North mouth of Arolik River adjacent to the shore of Kuskokwim Bay. The site is approximately 4 miles south of the city of Quinhagak. It was first surveyed for the 1880 United States census by Ivan Petroff and reported as "Agaligamute" (alternatively as "Aguliagamute").

In 1913, it was published as "Arolic" (Arolik) by the U.S. Coast and Geodetic Survey (USC&GS) on Chart T-3399. The Inuit name was reported to mean "moon." The place is no longer permanently inhabited. This may be the site of the burnt village reported to be at the north mouth of Arolik River. The Inuit name of the Arolik River is "Aalalik," meaning "ashes," and refers to ashes of the village at its mouth. A 1951 USGS topographical map of Arolik (Goodnews Bay quadrangle) showed a cluster of buildings still extant. However, by 2019, the aerial map of the location indicated no buildings present and the USGS 2017 Goodnews Bay C-8 topographical map omitted the locale entirely.

The site is accessible by gravel road from Quinhagak.

== Demographics ==
Historical population
Census	Pop.	Note	%±
1880	120		—
1890	94		−21.7%
U.S. Decennial Census

Arolik first appeared on the 1880 United States census as the Inuit village of "Agaligamute" with 120 residents, all Inuit. It returned in 1890 as "Aguliagamiut" with an all-native population. This included 15 families living in seven houses. It did not report on the census again after 1890.
