= Port Lions, Alaska =

City in Alaska, United States

Port Lions Masiqsirraq
- City
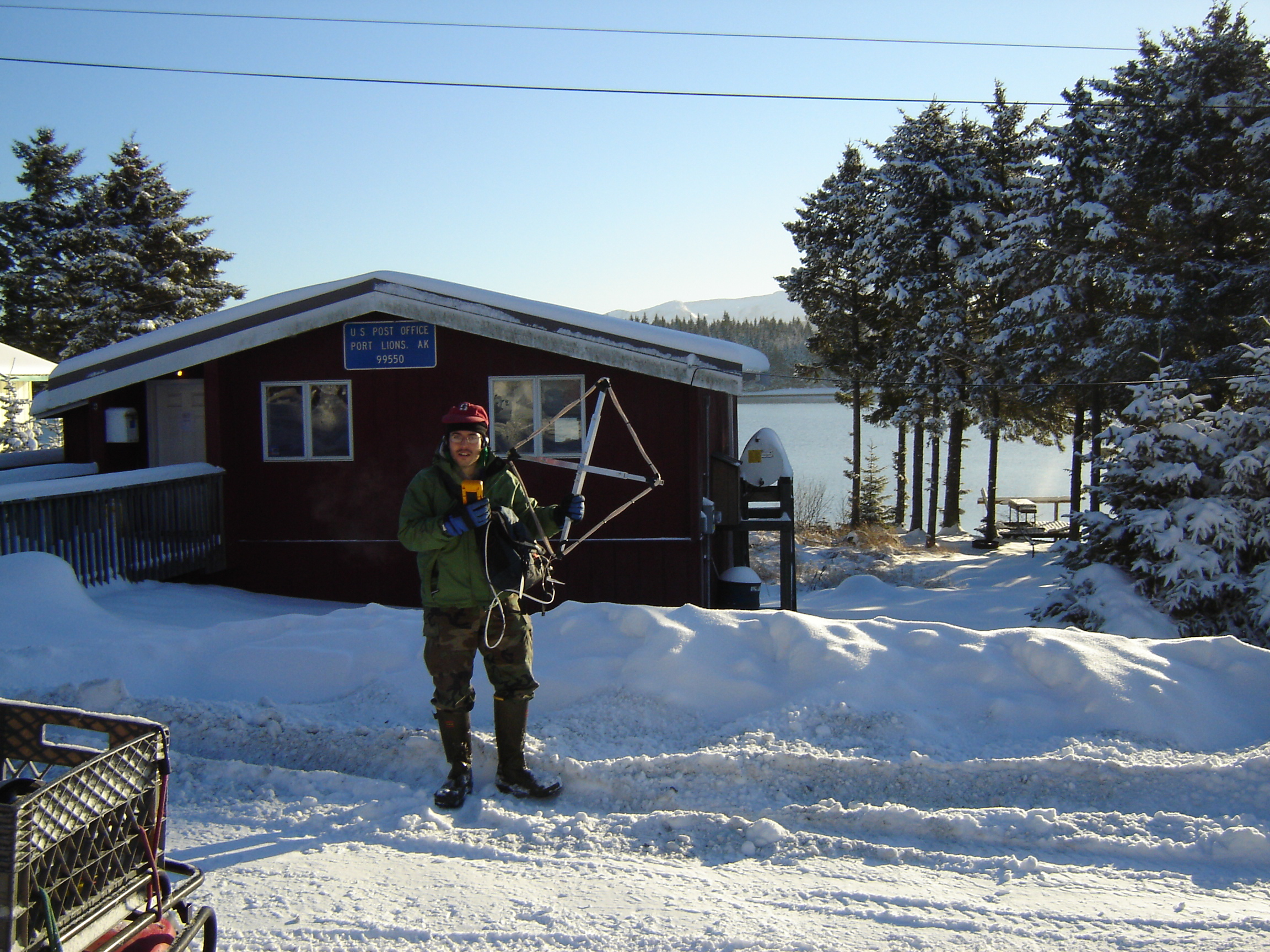
- A radio scientist from Stanford University at the Port Lions post office.

- Location in Alaska
- Coordinates: 57°52′5″N 152°52′48″W
- Country: United States
- State: Alaska
- Borough: Kodiak Island
- Incorporated: January 24, 1966

Government
  - Mayor: Dorinda Kewan
  - State senator: Gary Stevens (R)
  - State rep.: Louise Stutes (R)

Area
  - Total: 8.73 sq mi (22.60 km^{2})
  - Land: 4.98 sq mi (12.91 km^{2})
  - Water: 3.74 sq mi (9.69 km^{2})
- Elevation: 98 ft (30 m)

Population (2020)
  - Total: 170
  - Density: 34.1/sq mi (13.16/km^{2})
- Time zone: UTC-9 (Alaska (AKST))
  - Summer (DST): UTC-8 (AKDT)
- ZIP code: 99550
- Area code: 907
- FIPS code: 02-63610
- GNIS feature ID: 1408218

Port Lions (Masiqsirraq in Alutiiq) is a city located on Kodiak Island in the Kodiak Island Borough of the U.S. state of Alaska. As of the 2020 census, Port Lions had a population of 170.

Port Lions is the headquarters of the Native Village of Port Lions, a federally recognized Alaska Native tribe. The community was built to house the inhabitants of Ag'waneq from the neighboring island of Afognak and Port Wakefield from Raspberry Island, after their villages were destroyed by the Good Friday earthquake in 1964. Port Lions was built with help from the United States government and the Lions Club. It was named in honor of the club.

== Geography ==
Port Lions is located at 57°52′5″N 152°52′48″W (57.868070, -152.880047).

According to the United States Census Bureau, the city has a total area of 10.1 square miles (26 km^{2}), of which, 6.3 square miles (16 km^{2}) of it is land and 3.7 square miles (9.6 km^{2}) of it (36.98%) is water.

== Demographics ==
Historical population
Census	Pop.	Note	%±
1970	227		—
1980	215		−5.3%
1990	222		3.3%
2000	256		15.3%
2010	194		−24.2%
2020	170		−12.4%
U.S. Decennial Census

Port Lions first appeared on the 1970 U.S. Census, having previously incorporated in 1966.

=== 2020 census ===
As of the 2020 census, Port Lions had a population of 170. The median age was 50.3 years. 18.2% of residents were under the age of 18 and 22.4% of residents were 65 years of age or older. For every 100 females there were 107.3 males, and for every 100 females age 18 and over there were 117.2 males age 18 and over.

0.0% of residents lived in urban areas, while 100.0% lived in rural areas.

There were 76 households in Port Lions, of which 28.9% had children under the age of 18 living in them. Of all households, 48.7% were married-couple households, 26.3% were households with a male householder and no spouse or partner present, and 15.8% were households with a female householder and no spouse or partner present. About 23.7% of all households were made up of individuals and 10.6% had someone living alone who was 65 years of age or older.

There were 126 housing units, of which 39.7% were vacant. The homeowner vacancy rate was 4.3% and the rental vacancy rate was 33.3%.

Racial composition as of the 2020 census
Race	Number	Percent
White	55	32.4%
Black or African American	0	0.0%
American Indian and Alaska Native	105	61.8%
Asian	0	0.0%
Native Hawaiian and Other Pacific Islander	3	1.8%
Some other race	0	0.0%
Two or more races	7	4.1%
Hispanic or Latino (of any race)	1	0.6%

=== 2000 census ===
As of the 2000 census, there were 256 people, 89 households, and 76 families residing in the city. The population density was 40.3 inhabitants per square mile (15.6/km^{2}). There were 106 housing units at an average density of 16.7 units per square mile (6.4 units/km^{2}). The racial makeup of the city was 34.77% White, 63.28% Native American, and 1.95% from two or more races. 1.95% of the population were Hispanic or Latino of any race.

There were 89 households, out of which 44.9% had children under the age of 18 living with them, 74.2% were married couples living together, 7.9% had a female householder with no husband present, and 14.6% were non-families. 13.5% of all households were made up of individuals, and 4.5% had someone living alone who was 65 years of age or older. The average household size was 2.88 and the average family size was 3.11.

In the city, the age distribution of the population shows 33.2% under the age of 18, 3.9% from 18 to 24, 29.7% from 25 to 44, 26.2% from 45 to 64, and 7.0% who were 65 years of age or older. The median age was 36 years. For every 100 females, there were 113.3 males. For every 100 females age 18 and over, there were 106.0 males.

The median income for a household in the city was $39,107, and the median income for a family was $42,656. Males had a median income of $41,250 versus $30,625 for females. The per capita income for the city was $17,492. About 12.7% of families and 12.1% of the population were below the poverty line, including 15.0% of those under the age of eighteen and 10.7% of those 65 or over.

== Communications ==
Stanford University operates a remote scientific radio receiver in Port Lions to study very low frequency radio signals.

== Education ==
The Port Lions School, a K-12 rural school, is operated by the Kodiak Island Borough School District.
