= Larsen Bay, Alaska =

City in Alaska, United States

Larsen Bay Uyaqsaq
- City
- Location in Alaska
- Coordinates: 57°32′12″N 153°59′29″W
- Country: United States
- State: Alaska
- Borough: Kodiak Island
- Incorporated: 1974

Government
  - Mayor: Bill Nelson
  - State senator: Gary Stevens (R)
  - State rep.: Louise Stutes (R)

Area
  - Total: 6.31 sq mi (16.34 km^{2})
  - Land: 4.03 sq mi (10.44 km^{2})
  - Water: 2.27 sq mi (5.89 km^{2})
- Elevation: 3.3 ft (1 m)

Population (2020)
  - Total: 34
  - Density: 8.4/sq mi (3.26/km^{2})
- Time zone: UTC-9 (Alaska (AKST))
  - Summer (DST): UTC-8 (AKDT)
- ZIP code: 99624
- Area code: 907
- FIPS code: 02-43040
- GNIS feature ID: 1405216

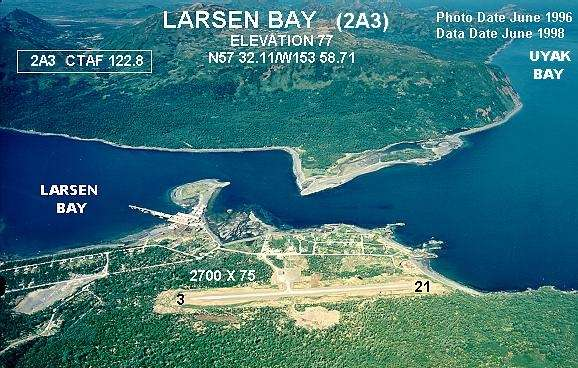
Larsen Bay Airport (2A3) in Larsen Bay, Alaska

Larsen Bay (Alutiiq: Uyaqsaq) is a city in Kodiak Island Borough, Alaska, United States. As of the 2020 census, Larsen Bay had a population of 34.

== Geography ==
Larsen Bay is located at 57°32′12″N 153°59′29″W (57.536651, -153.991440).

According to the United States Census Bureau, the city has a total area of 7.6 square miles (20 km^{2}), of which, 5.4 square miles (14 km^{2}) of it is land and 2.2 square miles (5.7 km^{2}) of it (28.7%) is water.

=== Climate ===
Climate data for Larsen Bay, Alaska
Month	Jan	Feb	Mar	Apr	May	Jun	Jul	Aug	Sep	Oct	Nov	Dec	Year
Record high °F (°C)	55 (13)	53 (12)	56 (13)	65 (18)	83 (28)	83 (28)	78 (26)	76 (24)	72 (22)	64 (18)	53 (12)	49 (9)	83 (28)
Mean daily maximum °F (°C)	35.1 (1.7)	36.5 (2.5)	38.4 (3.6)	43.3 (6.3)	51.6 (10.9)	60.0 (15.6)	63.1 (17.3)	61.4 (16.3)	57.3 (14.1)	45.7 (7.6)	39.7 (4.3)	33.9 (1.1)	47.2 (8.4)
Daily mean °F (°C)	28.7 (−1.8)	29.7 (−1.3)	31.6 (−0.2)	35.5 (1.9)	42.9 (6.1)	50.9 (10.5)	54.9 (12.7)	54.3 (12.4)	50.0 (10.0)	39.0 (3.9)	33.5 (0.8)	27.6 (−2.4)	39.9 (4.4)
Mean daily minimum °F (°C)	22.2 (−5.4)	22.8 (−5.1)	24.8 (−4.0)	27.7 (−2.4)	34.2 (1.2)	41.7 (5.4)	46.6 (8.1)	47.2 (8.4)	42.6 (5.9)	32.3 (0.2)	27.3 (−2.6)	21.3 (−5.9)	32.6 (0.3)
Record low °F (°C)	−5 (−21)	−15 (−26)	−5 (−21)	2 (−17)	15 (−9)	28 (−2)	34 (1)	35 (2)	24 (−4)	10 (−12)	−1 (−18)	−3 (−19)	−15 (−26)
Average precipitation inches (mm)	2.09 (53)	1.47 (37)	1.54 (39)	1.06 (27)	0.76 (19)	1.10 (28)	1.17 (30)	2.55 (65)	2.88 (73)	2.64 (67)	2.85 (72)	1.95 (50)	22.06 (560)
Average snowfall inches (cm)	3.7 (9.4)	4.4 (11)	3.6 (9.1)	0.7 (1.8)	0.3 (0.76)	0.0 (0.0)	0.0 (0.0)	0.0 (0.0)	0.0 (0.0)	0.4 (1.0)	1.6 (4.1)	4.1 (10)	18.8 (47.16)
Source: WRCC

== History ==
Larsen Bay was named in honor of local hunter and sailor Peter Adolf Larsen, a Danish immigrant.

Larsen Bay first appeared on the 1940 U.S. Census as an unincorporated village. It formally incorporated as a city in 1974.

== Demographics ==
Historical population
Census	Pop.	Note	%±
1940	38		—
1950	53		39.5%
1960	72		35.8%
1970	109		51.4%
1980	168		54.1%
1990	147		−12.5%
2000	115		−21.8%
2010	87		−24.3%
2020	34		−60.9%
U.S. Decennial Census

=== 2020 census ===
As of the 2020 census, Larsen Bay had a population of 34. The median age was 46.5 years. 5.9% of residents were under the age of 18 and 29.4% of residents were 65 years of age or older. For every 100 females there were 78.9 males, and for every 100 females age 18 and over there were 77.8 males age 18 and over.

0.0% of residents lived in urban areas, while 100.0% lived in rural areas.

There were 24 households in Larsen Bay, of which 29.2% had children under the age of 18 living in them. Of all households, 20.8% were married-couple households, 29.2% were households with a male householder and no spouse or partner present, and 29.2% were households with a female householder and no spouse or partner present. About 37.5% of all households were made up of individuals and 16.7% had someone living alone who was 65 years of age or older.

There were 104 housing units, of which 76.9% were vacant. The homeowner vacancy rate was 0.0% and the rental vacancy rate was 0.0%.

Racial composition as of the 2020 census
Race	Number	Percent
White	5	14.7%
Black or African American	0	0.0%
American Indian and Alaska Native	27	79.4%
Asian	0	0.0%
Native Hawaiian and Other Pacific Islander	0	0.0%
Some other race	1	2.9%
Two or more races	1	2.9%
Hispanic or Latino (of any race)	0	0.0%

=== 2000 census ===
As of the census of 2000, there were 115 people, 40 households, and 26 families residing in the city. The population density was 21.1 inhabitants per square mile (8.1/km^{2}). There were 70 housing units at an average density of 12.9 per square mile (5.0/km^{2}). The racial makeup of the city was 20.87% White, 78.26% Native American, and 0.87% from two or more races.

There were 40 households, out of which 42.5% had children under the age of 18 living with them, 45.0% were married couples living together, 12.5% had a female householder with no husband present, and 35.0% were non-families. 27.5% of all households were made up of individuals, and 5.0% had someone living alone who was 65 years of age or older. The average household size was 2.88 and the average family size was 3.54.

In the city, the age distribution of the population shows 38.3% under the age of 18, 4.3% from 18 to 24, 28.7% from 25 to 44, 19.1% from 45 to 64, and 9.6% who were 65 years of age or older. The median age was 29 years. For every 100 females, there were 113.0 males. For every 100 females age 18 and over, there were 102.9 males.

The median income for a household in the city was $40,833, and the median income for a family was $30,000. Males had a median income of $31,250 versus $50,625 for females. The per capita income for the city was $16,227. There were 27.3% of families and 20.5% of the population living below the poverty line, including 22.6% of under eighteen and 33.3% of those over 64.

== Education ==
The Larsen Bay School, a K-12 rural school, is operated by the Kodiak Island Borough School District. The school was closed for the 2018-2019 school year.
