= Afognak, Alaska =

Village in Alaska, United States

Afognak Agw'aneq
- Village
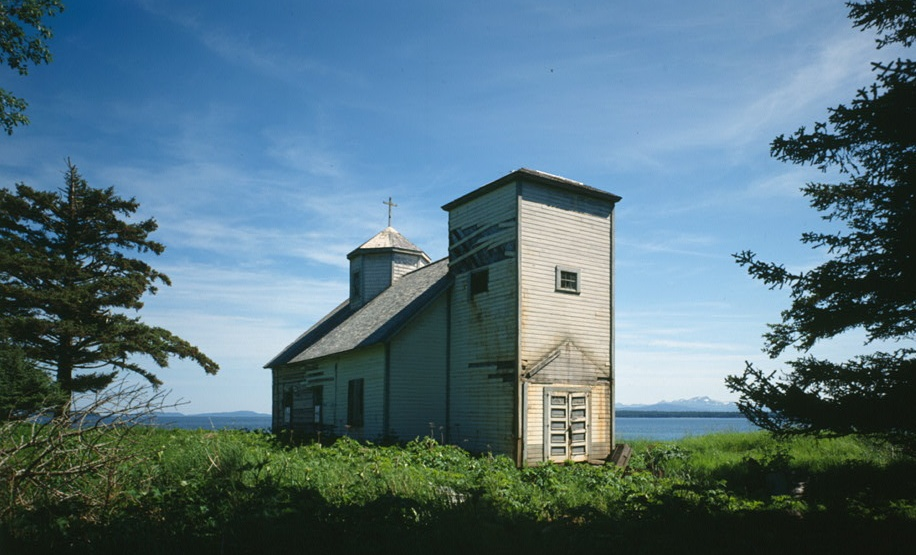
- Nativity of Holy Theotokos Church

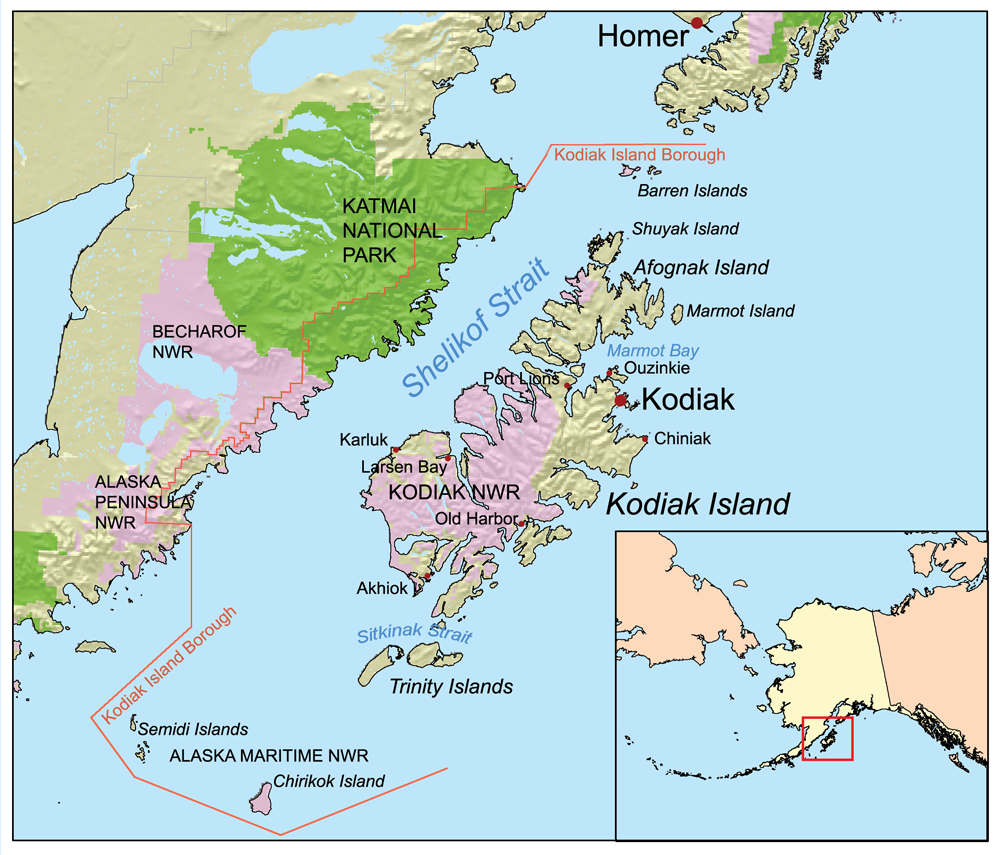

- Location of Afognak in Alaska.
- Coordinates: 58°00′28″N 152°46′05″W
- Country: United States of America
- State: Alaska
- Borough: Kodiak Island Borough
- Island: Afognak Island
- First settled: abt. 5,500 B.C.E.
- Destroyed: March 27, 1964 (Good Friday earthquake)
- Named for: Named by Russian settlers; derived from Afognak Island in 1839.
- Time zone: UTC-9 (AKST)
  - Summer (DST): UTC-8 (AKDT)

Afognak (/əˈfɒɡnæk/; also Agw'aneq in Alutiiq was an Alutiiq village on the island of Afognak in Kodiak Island Borough, Alaska, United States. It was located on Afognak Bay on the southwest coast of the island, three miles north of Kodiak Island. The site is now within the CDP of Aleneva.

== History ==
=== Prehistory ===
For more than 7,500 years, the Alutiiq people lived in hundreds of settlements in the Kodiak Archipelago. Like most other early native Alaskan peoples, the people of Afognak fished and hunted sea mammals from kayaks covered in seal skin. Men and women performed different tasks for the village. The people of Afognak traded services and goods with other settlements in Southeast Alaska and the Aleutian chain.

=== The Russian settlement period ===
The Russian American Company arrived on the island in 1784. The Russians invited and took several men from the village to hunt sea otters for sale in Europe. However, many people died as a result of mistreatment, and the smallpox epidemic of 1837–1840 killed many others in the archipelago. The Alutiiq began to change their lifestyle and governance. The name "Afognak" was derived from Afognak Island and was first reported in 1839 by Russian Sub-Lt. Mikhail Murashev. The natives and Russians on the island continued to fish, hunt, and gather food. Despite tensions between the two groups, many Russians and natives married and started families, and many natives learned Russian and converted to Russian Orthodoxy. The Alutiiq tradition was not abandoned, however, and was just added to. Many Russian workers who had married into the native community settled into the Russian American Company retirement communities upon their retirement. Eventually, the community of Russian Town, located next to Aleut Town, grew into the Afognak village, and the two merged.

=== The American period ===
The U.S. bought the occupation rights in 1867. Schools that only taught in English were established in regions where no one spoke the language, but by 1900, much of the younger community was trilingual, speaking Alutiiq, Russian, and English. In the late 1800s, the U.S. fishing business began to flourish. The business opened many canneries in Kodiak, Alaska, and fishermen from Scandinavia traveled to Alaska. The business in the area raised tension with the Alutiiq, who wanted to keep their fishing lifestyle. A post office was maintained intermittently from 1888 to 1964.

Afognak was covered by one meter (3 ft) of ash when Mount Katmai erupted in 1912. The 1964 Good Friday earthquake generated a tsunami which destroyed the village. With help from the Lions Club and the federal government, a new community was constructed on the northeast coast of Kodiak Island, called Port Lions in honor of the Lions Club who helped relocate the village. The former residents of Afognak moved permanently in December 1964, though 11 residents were still residing there as late as 1980.

== Demographics ==
Historical population
Census	Pop.	Note	%±
1880	339		—
1890	409		20.6%
1900	307		−24.9%
1910	318		3.6%
1920	308		−3.1%
1930	298		−3.2%
1940	197		−33.9%
1950	148		−24.9%
1960	190		28.4%
1980	11		—
U.S. Decennial Census

Afognak first appeared on the 1880 U.S. Census as an unincorporated village of 339 residents with a "Creole" (mixed Russian and native) majority of 195 and 144 Inuit minority. In 1890, the population also included Little Afognak, Cattanee and two Canneries. It continued to report until the 1960 census. With the 1964 Good Friday earthquake, most of the population departed. It did not appear on the 1970 census, but did in 1980 as an Alaskan Native Village designation. It has not reported separately since, but as of 2000, the original area that included Afognak is now mostly within the CDP of Aleneva.

== Geography ==
Afognak was located on the southwestern shore of Afognak Island in Kodiak Island Borough, Alaska, United States. It is located three miles north of Kodiak Island.
