= Southwest Alaska Municipal Conference =

Non-profit regional economic development organization for Southwest Alaska

The Southwest Alaska Municipal Conference (SWAMC) is a non-profit regional economic development organization for Southwest Alaska. SWAMC serves three subregions of Southwest Alaska: the Aleutian/Pribilofs, Bristol Bay, and Kodiak.

SWAMC was formed out of the common interests of the region encompassing the Aleutians East Borough, Alaska, the Aleutians West Census Area, the Bristol Bay Borough, the Dillingham Census Area, the Kodiak Island Borough, and the Lake & Peninsula Borough. In 1988, municipal leaders from the region forged a partnership to advocate for the needs of rural communities and the responsible development of the region's core economic sector - commercial seafood harvesting and processing.

SWAMC is a member of the State of Alaska's ARDOR Program.
