= Shuyak Island State Park =

State park in Alaska, United States

- Location within Alaska
- Location: Kodiak Island Borough, Alaska, United States
- Coordinates: 58°31′31″N 152°30′17″W
- Area: 47,000 acres (19,000 ha)
- Elevation: 249 ft (76 m)
- Administrator: Alaska Department of Natural Resources
- Website: Official website

Shuyak Island State Park is an approximately 47,000 acre Alaska state park on most of Shuyak Island in the Kodiak Archipelago. The park includes a coastal forest of Sitka spruce, coastline, beaches, and waterways.

The park contains four cabins for recreational use and is only accessible via air or water.
