= Devils Prongs =

Mountain in Alaska, United States

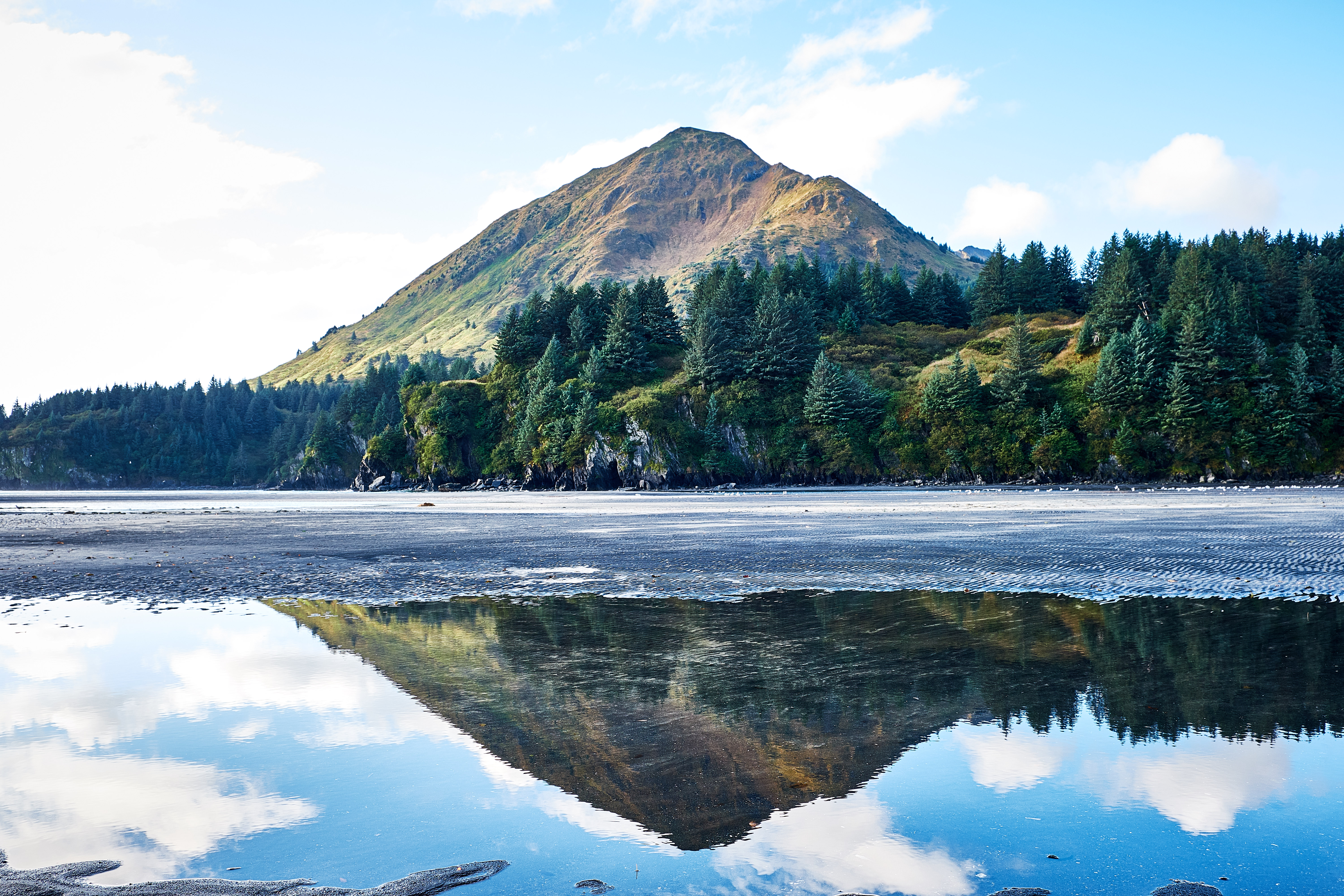
- Northeast aspect

Highest point
- Elevation: 2,175 ft (663 m)
- Prominence: 561 ft (171 m)
- Parent peak: Peak 2329
- Isolation: 1.28 mi (2.06 km)
- Coordinates: 57°48′45″N 152°28′00″W

Geography
- Location within Alaska
- Interactive map of Devils Prongs
- Country: United States
- State: Alaska
- Borough: Kodiak Island Borough
- Parent range: Kodiak Archipelago
- Topo map: USGS Kodiak D-2

Devils Prongs is a 2,175-foot-elevation (663-meter) mountain in Alaska.

== Description ==
Devils Prongs is located two miles (3.2 km) northwest of Kodiak at the head of Monaska Bay on the northeast coast of Kodiak Island. Precipitation runoff from the three peaks of the mountain drains north into Virginia Creek and south into Pillar Creek before each empty into Monaska Bay. Topographic relief is significant as the mountain rises over 2,000 feet (610 meters) above tidewater of Monaska Bay in approximately zero point seven five miles (1.21 km). The mountain's name was applied in 1869 by the United States Coast and Geodetic Survey and the toponym was officially adopted in 1966 by the United States Board on Geographic Names. Russian naval officers in 1808 gave this landform the descriptive name Gory Chyernysheva, meaning "Black Mountains."

== Climate ==
According to the Köppen climate classification system, Devils Prongs is located in a subpolar oceanic climate zone with cold, snowy winters, and cool summers. Weather systems coming off the North Pacific are forced upwards by the mountains (orographic lift), causing heavy precipitation in the form of rainfall and snowfall. Winter temperatures can drop to 0 °F with wind chill factors below −10 °F.

== Gallery ==
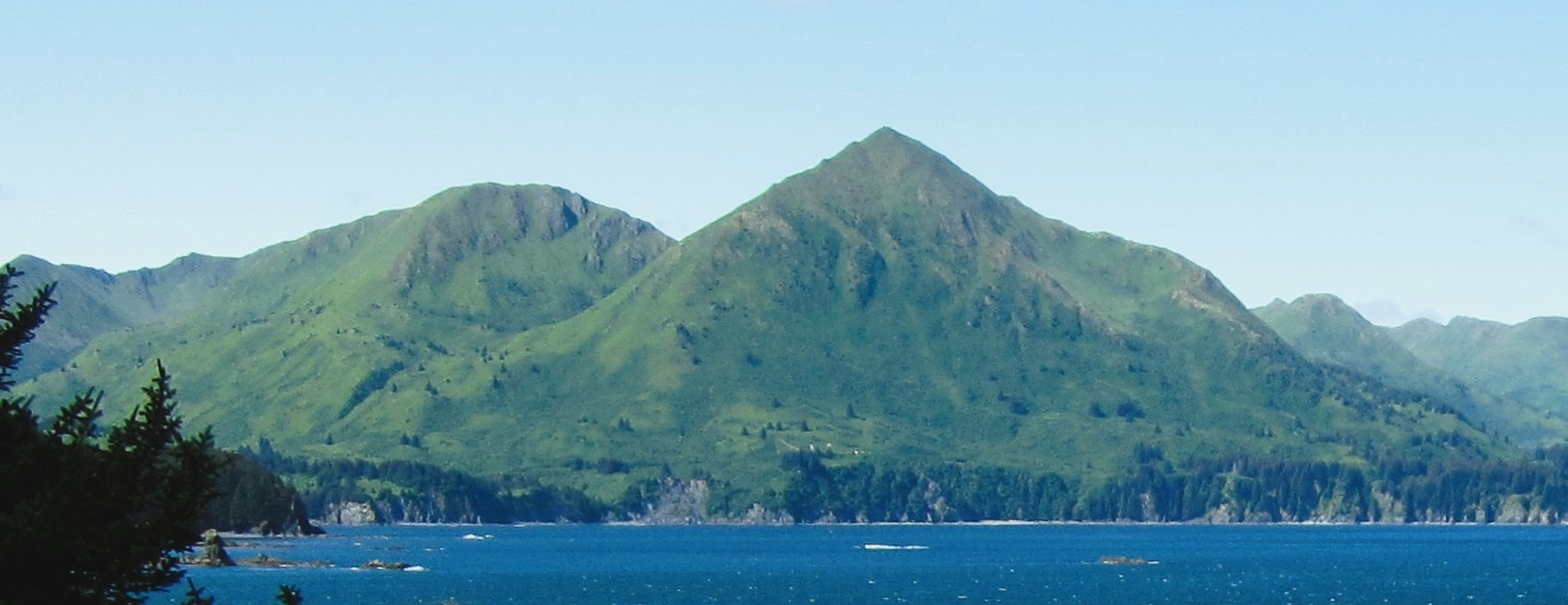
East aspect

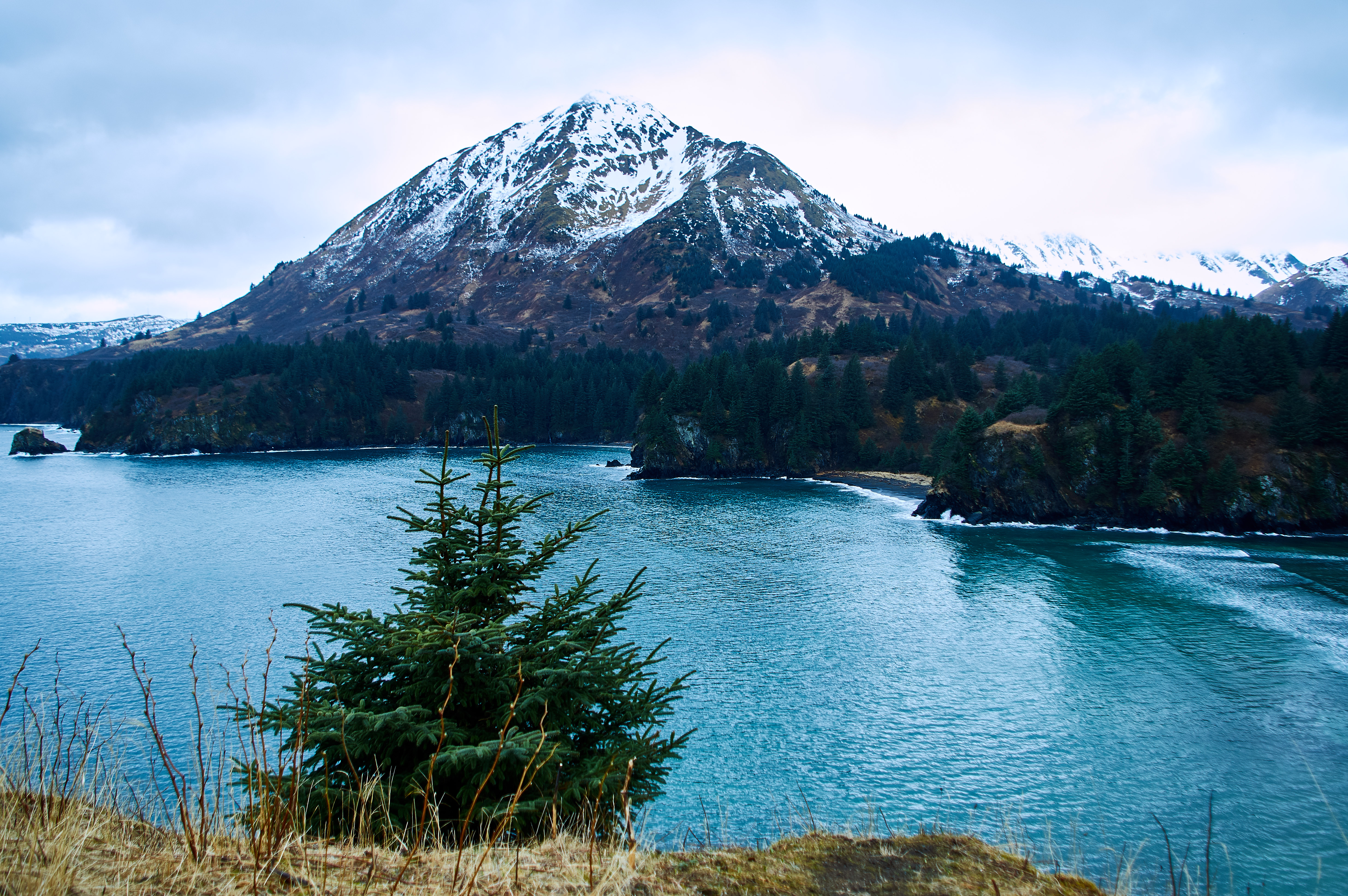
Northernmost of three peaks of Devils Prongs viewed across Monashka Bay

== See also ==
- List of mountain peaks of Alaska
- Geography of Alaska
