= Port Wakefield, Alaska =

Ghost town in Alaska, United States

Coordinates: 58°02′57″N 153°03′09″W

Port Wakefield is a ghost town in the U.S. state of Alaska. It is located on the northeast coast of Raspberry Island in the Kodiak Archipelago, along the western shores of the Gulf of Alaska.

The community was established in the 1930s by Lee Howard Wakefield as a herring reduction plant after he relocated the family's salmon cannery business, Apex Fish Company, from Anacortes, Washington and renamed the company Wakefield Fisheries. Lee's sons Howard, Lavern and Lowell began fishing for and processing experimentally for king crab in 1939.

Lowell Wakefield, who is regarded as the founder of the Alaskan king crab industry, introduced flash frozen cooked king crab, partly because of declining herring stocks in surrounding waters. As well as the processing plant and cold storage, cedar log houses and a schoolhouse were added to the existing village for the workers and their families, with a population of approximately 100.

Port Wakefield suffered badly in the 1964 Alaska earthquake and tsunami, when Raspberry Island subsided by as much as six feet. This was the most powerful recorded earthquake in North American history, and the third most powerful ever measured by seismograph; with a moment magnitude of 9.2 and a maximum Mercalli intensity of XI (Extreme). The town was not destroyed, but the cannery and community were no longer viable. The land was eventually purchased and is now used for tourism, as wilderness lodges.

The crab plant was relocated to Port Lions on Kodiak Island, in a much more accessible location, with a good dock and harbor facilities. The plant was connected to Port Lions by a long causeway and a new road. Some of the cedar log houses were moved on barges from Port Wakefield to Port Lions, where they still stand. However, the plant burnt down and has not been rebuilt.
