= Buskin River =

River in Alaska, the United States of America

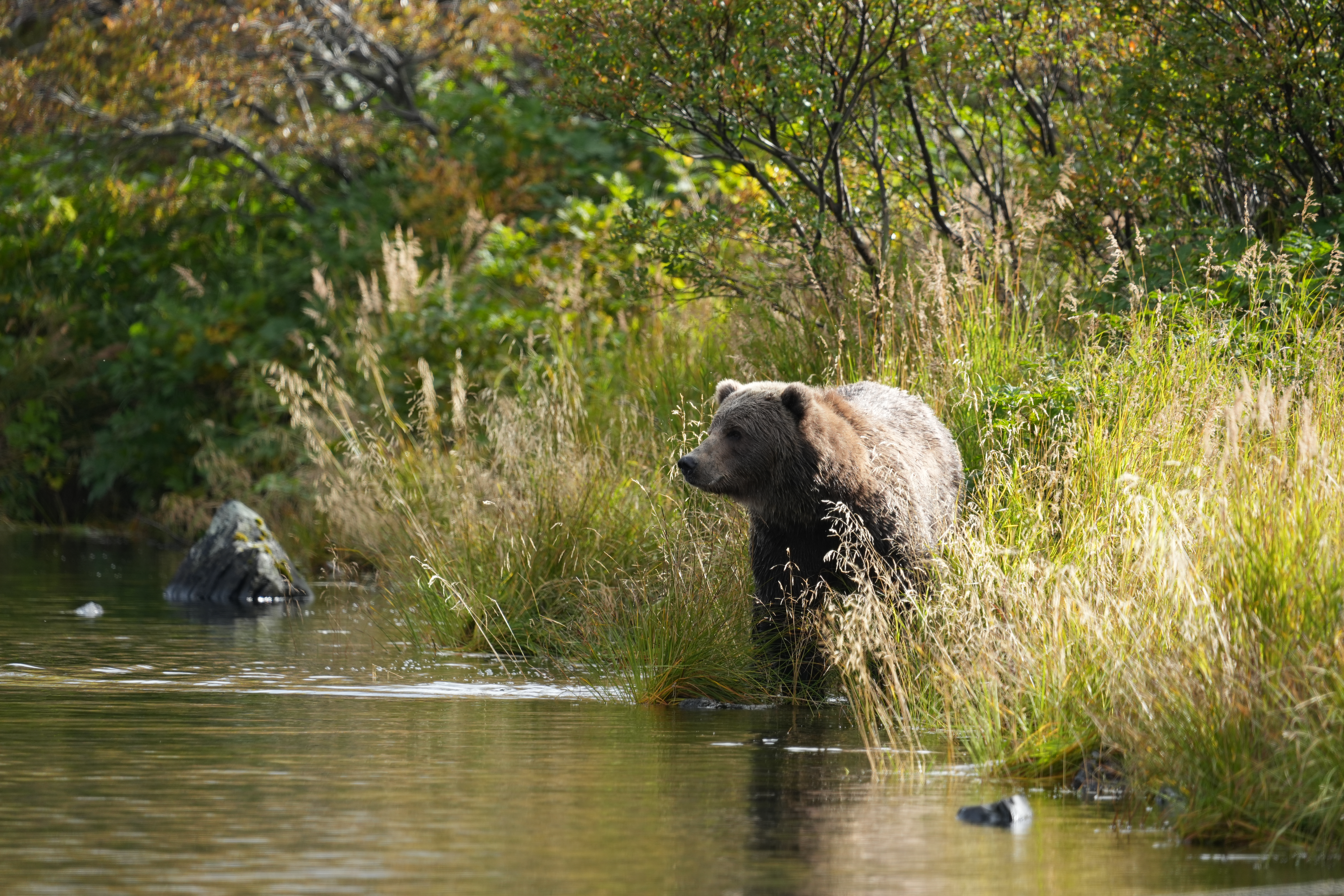

- Location within Alaska

Location
- Country: United States
- State: Alaska
- Borough: Kodiak Island

Physical characteristics
- Source
  - location: Buskin Lake
  - coordinates: 57°46′46″N 157°52′18.7″W
  - elevation: 150 ft (46 m)
- Mouth: Chiniak Bay
  - coordinates: 57°45′24.3″N 152°28′57.2″W
  - elevation: 0 ft (0 m)
- Length: 3.5 mi (5.6 km)

The Buskin River is a river on Kodiak Island in the state of Alaska. It is 3.5 miles (5.6 km) long, and is 3.7 miles (6.0 km) southwest of the island's main city of Kodiak, Alaska. It begins at the outlet of Buskin Lake and flows generally southeast through wilderness. Finally, it turns east to empty into Saint Paul Harbor, a portion of the larger Chiniak Bay on the island's east coast. The lower portion of the river passes through Buskin River State Park. The river also hosts all five species of salmon found in Alaska, which are counted annually by a movable weir.

== See also ==
- List of rivers of Alaska
