= Kodiak Station, Alaska =

- Census-designated place
- Location within the state of Alaska
- Coordinates: 57°45′1″N 152°30′23″W
- Country: United States
- State: Alaska
- Borough: Kodiak Island

Government
  - Borough mayor: Jerrol Friend
  - State senator: Gary Stevens (R)
  - State rep.: Louise Stutes (R)

Area
  - Total: 30.92 sq mi (80.09 km^{2})
  - Land: 23.20 sq mi (60.10 km^{2})
  - Water: 7.72 sq mi (19.99 km^{2})

Population (2020)
  - Total: 1,673
  - Density: 72.1/sq mi (27.84/km^{2})
- Time zone: UTC-9 (Alaska (AKST))
  - Summer (DST): UTC-8 (AKDT)
- ZIP code: 99615
- Area code: 907
- FIPS code: 02-41210

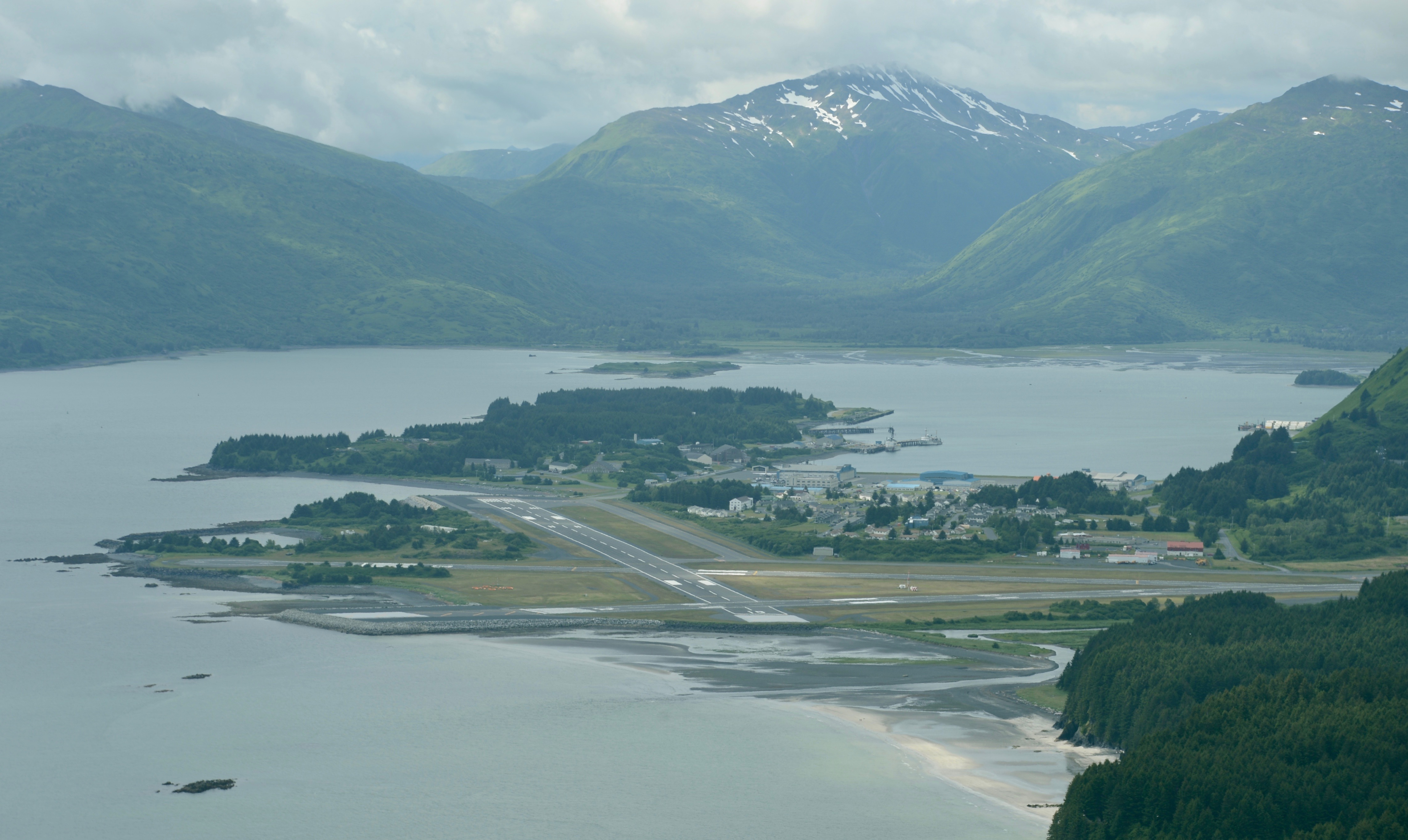

Kodiak Station is a census-designated place (CDP) in Kodiak Island Borough, Alaska, United States. At the 2020 census the population was 1,673, up from 1,301 in 2010.

== Geography ==
Kodiak Station is located at 57°45′1″N 152°30′23″W (57.750215, -152.506441).

According to the United States Census Bureau, the CDP has a total area of 30.9 square miles (80.1 km^{2}), of which 23.2 square miles (60.0 km^{2}) is land and 7.8 square miles (20.1 km^{2}), or 25.06%, is water.

== Demographics ==
Historical population
Census	Pop.	Note	%±
1970	3,052		—
1980	1,370		−55.1%
1990	2,025		47.8%
2000	1,840		−9.1%
2010	1,301		−29.3%
2020	1,673		28.6%
U.S. Decennial Census

Kodiak Station first appeared on the 1970 U.S. Census as an unincorporated military base. In 1980, it was reclassified as a census-designated place (CDP).

=== 2020 census ===
As of the 2020 census, Kodiak Station had a population of 1,673. The median age was 24.2 years. 31.9% of residents were under the age of 18 and 1.2% of residents were 65 years of age or older. For every 100 females there were 166.0 males, and for every 100 females age 18 and over there were 182.2 males age 18 and over.

0.0% of residents lived in urban areas, while 100.0% lived in rural areas.

There were 418 households in Kodiak Station, of which 62.7% had children under the age of 18 living in them. Of all households, 78.7% were married-couple households, 16.3% were households with a male householder and no spouse or partner present, and 4.1% were households with a female householder and no spouse or partner present. About 7.7% of all households were made up of individuals and 0.0% had someone living alone who was 65 years of age or older.

There were 462 housing units, of which 9.5% were vacant. The homeowner vacancy rate was 0.0% and the rental vacancy rate was 0.5%.

Racial composition as of the 2020 census
Race	Number	Percent
White	1,322	79.0%
Black or African American	45	2.7%
American Indian and Alaska Native	33	2.0%
Asian	67	4.0%
Native Hawaiian and Other Pacific Islander	5	0.3%
Some other race	73	4.4%
Two or more races	128	7.7%
Hispanic or Latino (of any race)	181	10.8%

=== 2000 census ===
As of the census of 2000, there were 1,840 people, 492 households, and 481 families residing in the CDP. The population density was 78.5 inhabitants per square mile (30.3/km^{2}). There were 536 housing units at an average density of 22.9 per square mile (8.8/km^{2}). The racial makeup of the CDP was 87.88% White, 3.64% Black or African American, 1.96% Native American, 1.03% Asian, 0.38% Pacific Islander, 2.45% from other races, and 2.66% from two or more races. 5.54% of the population were Hispanic or Latino of any race.

There were 492 households, out of which 76.2% had children under the age of 18 living with them, 93.9% were married couples living together, 1.8% had a female householder with no husband present, and 2.2% were non-families. 2.0% of all households were made up of individuals, and none had someone living alone who was 65 years of age or older. The average household size was 3.55 and the average family size was 3.59.

In the CDP, the population was spread out, with 41.5% under the age of 18, 11.2% from 18 to 24, 45.1% from 25 to 44, and 2.2% from 45 to 64. The median age was 24 years. For every 100 females, there were 107.7 males. For every 100 females age 18 and over, there were 117.8 males.

The median income for a household in the CDP was $46,189, and the median income for a family was $45,762. Males had a median income of $27,383 versus $23,047 for females. The per capita income for the CDP was $14,234. None of the families and none of the population were living below the poverty line, including no under eighteens and none of those over 64.
