= Barren Islands =

Native name: Usu'unaat
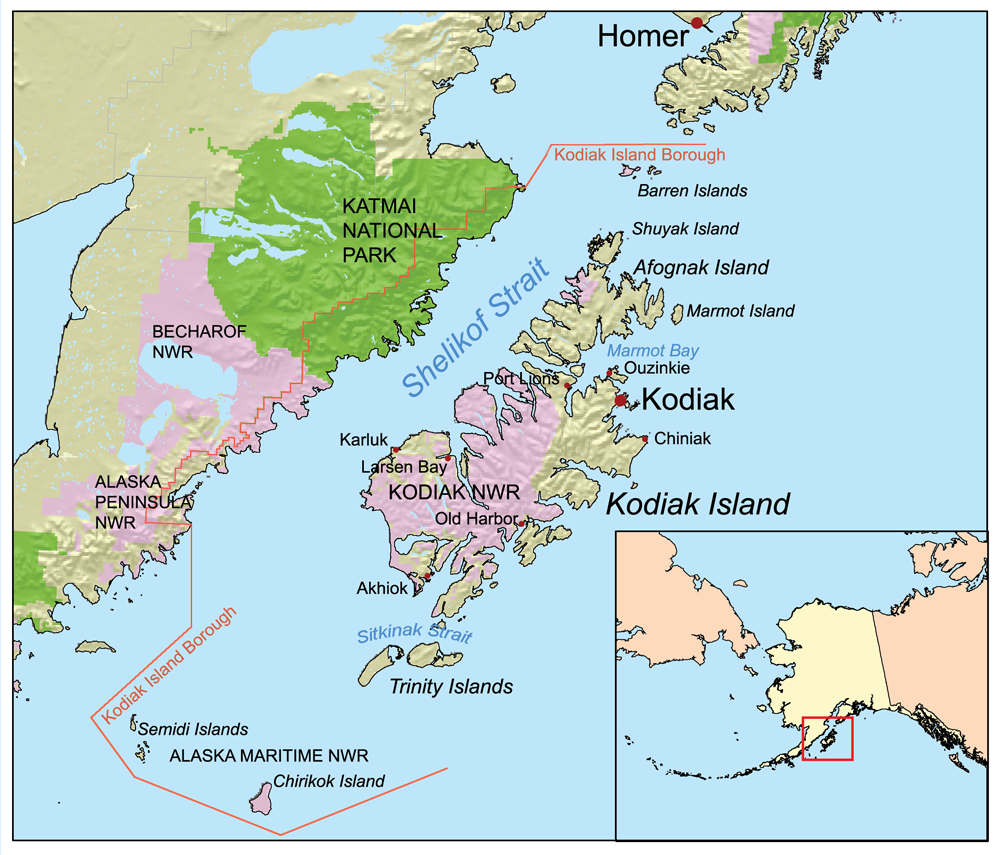
- The Barren Islands are the northernmost islands in the Kodiak Archipelago, and are located northeast of Shuyak Island and southwest of the Kenai Peninsula.
- Interactive map of Barren Islands

Geography
- Location: Gulf of Alaska
- Coordinates: 58°55′N 152°08′W
- Archipelago: Kodiak Archipelago
- Total islands: 6
- Area: 42.03 km^{2} (16.23 sq mi)

Administration
- United States
- State: Alaska
- Borough: Kodiak Island

Demographics
- Population: 0 (2010)

Additional information
- Part of Alaska Maritime National Wildlife Refuge

The Barren Islands (Sugpiaq: Usu'unaat) are an archipelago in Alaska in the United States. They are the northernmost islands of the Kodiak Archipelago. The largest island of the group is Ushagat Island. The islands have a combined land area of 16.23 square miles (42.0 km^{2}) and are uninhabited. The largest breeding grounds of seabirds in Alaska are located in the Barren Islands on East Amatuli Island and Nord Island. The archipelago is part of the Alaska Maritime National Wildlife Refuge.

== Geography ==
The Barren Islands are a group of islands in the Gulf of Alaska that lie off the south-central coast of Alaska in the United States. They are the northernmost islands of the Kodiak Archipelago. They are located between the Kenai Peninsula on the Alaskan mainland to their northeast and Shuyak Island in the Kodiak Archipelago to their southwest. They stretch across 15 miles (24 km) of the Gulf of Alaska, centered around 57°48′N 152°15′W.

The Barren Islands group is made up of six islands:

- East Amatuli Island, the easternmost island, 2.5 miles (4.0 km) long, located 70 miles (110 km) northeast of Afognak, Alaska, at 58°55′N 152°00′W.
- West Amatuli Island, also known as Amatuli Island, 3 miles (4.8 km) long, located between East Amatuli and Ushagat Islands, 70 miles (110 km) northeast of Afognak, at 58°56′N 152°03′W.
- Ushagat Island, the westernmost and largest island, 8 miles (12.9 km) long, located 68 miles (109 km) northeast of Afognak at 58°55′30″N 152°15′00″W.
- Nord Island, 0.5 miles (0.8 km) across, located 1.5 miles (2.4 km) northeast of Ushagat Island and 72 miles (116 km) northeast of Afognak at 58°58′15″N 152°09′00″W.
- Sud Island, 1 mile (1.6 km) long, located 5 miles (8.0 km) northwest of Nord Island at 58.8975°N 152.2094°W.
- Sugarloaf Island, 0.7 miles (1.1 km) across, located 1.3 miles (2.1 km) south of East and West Amatuli Islands and 68 miles (109 km) northeast of Afognak, Alaska, at 58°53′10″N 152°02′15″W.

Prominent landmarks on the islands include:

- Amatuli Cove, a 0.6-mile (1.0 km) wide cove on the northwest coast of East Amatuli Island at 58°55′10″N 152°00′15″W
- Table Mountain (1,350 feet (410 meters) on the northeast end of Ushagat Island at 58°56′35″N 152°10′05″W

== Government ==
The Barren Islands are uninhabited. Administratively, they are part of Alaska's Kodiak Island Borough. They also make up a part of the Gulf of Alaska Unit of the Alaska Maritime National Wildlife Refuge.

== History ==
The Barren Islands were named on 25 May 1778 by the British explorer Captain James Cook of the Royal Navy, who wrote, "They obtained their name of Barren Isles from their very naked appearance."
