= Semidi Islands =

Group of islands of the state of Alaska, United States

Coordinates: 56°03′43″N 156°41′54″W

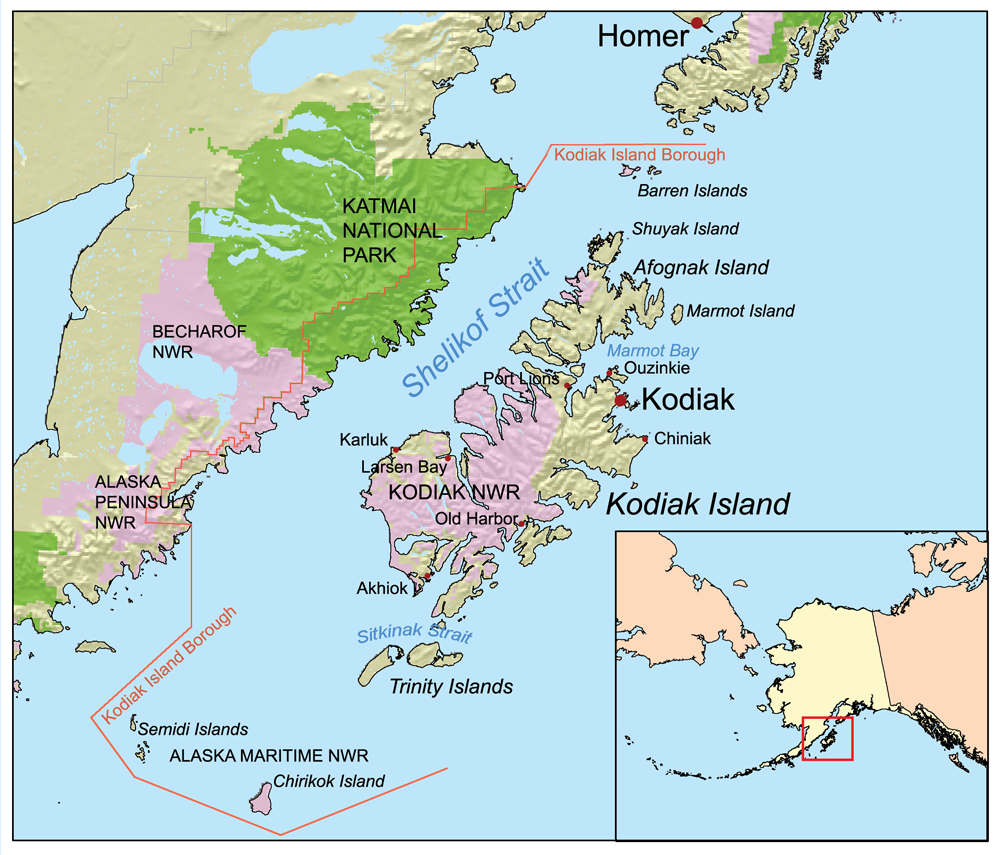
The Semidi Islands are the group in the lower left corner

The Semidi Islands are a group of islands of the state of Alaska, United States, lying offshore in the Gulf of Alaska. The islands are part of Kodiak Island Borough and are located southwest of Kodiak Island, about halfway between the Alaska Peninsula mainland and Chirikof Island. The largest islands of the group are Aghiyuk Island and Chowiet Island. The island group has a total land area of 30.178 km^{2} (11.652 sq mi) and is uninhabited. They are part of the Alaska Peninsula unit of the Alaska Maritime National Wildlife Refuge.

== Wilderness ==
Before being combined with other wilderness areas to form the Alaska Maritime National Wildlife Refuge in 1980, the Semidi Wilderness was known as the Semidi National Wildlife Refuge. The 250,000 acre wilderness area provides habitat for 2.4 million birds, almost half the breeding seabirds of the Alaska Peninsula Unit, including 370,000 horned puffins. The seabed area around the islands provides temporary habitat for populations of sea otters, sea lions, seals, porpoises, and whales.
