= Tugidak Island =

Island of the Kodiak Archipelago, Alaska, U.S.

Coordinates: 56°30′24″N 154°37′42″W

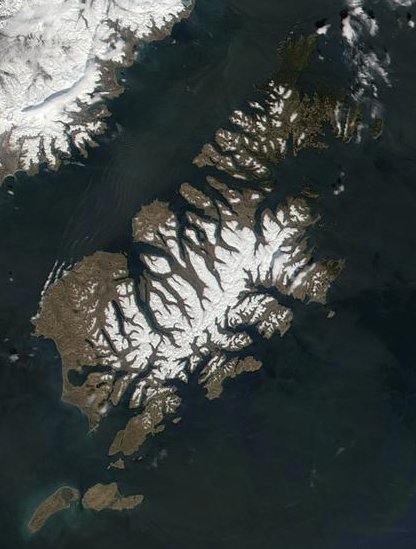
Satellite imagery of Kodiak Archipelago where Tugidak Island belong

Tugidak Island is an island of the Kodiak Archipelago in Kodiak Island Borough, Alaska, United States. It lies southwest of the southern tip of Kodiak Island in the western part of the Gulf of Alaska. Sitkinak Island lies to its east. The two islands are the largest components of the Trinity Islands of Alaska. The Trinity Islands, and thus Tugidak, are part of the Gulf of Alaska unit of Alaska Maritime National Wildlife Refuge. Tugidak Island has a land area of 173.142 km^{2} (66.85 sq mi) and no resident population. The most prominent feature of the island is the large shallow lagoon near its northeastern end. This part of the island was established as the Tugidak Island Critical Habitat Area by the state of Alaska in 1998 as a wildlife conservation area, and is managed by the Alaska Department of Fish and Game. The island has historically been known as a nesting spot for harbor seals as well as many species of marine birds.
