= Marmot Island =

Island in Alaska, United States

Coordinates: 58°12′56″N 151°50′23″W

Marmot Island is an island of the Kodiak Archipelago in the Gulf of Alaska in the U.S. state of Alaska. It is part of Kodiak Island Borough and lies east of Afognak Island. The island has a land area of 45.196 km^{2} (17.45 sq mi) and is unpopulated.

Land Ownership Tonki Peninsula and most of the Seal Bay drainage are state owned and administered by Alaska State Parks. Marmot Island is mostly state land with one small parcel of private land on the west side. The remainder of the unit is owned by Afognak Native Corporation, Ouzinkie Native Corporation.
