= Whale Island (Alaska) =

Coordinates: 57°57′09″N 152°47′31″W

Whale Island is an island in the Kodiak Archipelago of the Gulf of Alaska in Kodiak Island Borough, Alaska, United States, off the northern end of Kodiak Island, south of Afognak Island. It is separated from the former by Whale Pass and the latter by Afognak Strait. Raspberry Island is westward and Spruce Island to the east. It has a land area of 39.235 km^{2} (15.149 sq mi) and is unpopulated.
