= Raspberry Island (Alaska) =

Island in Alaska, United States

Coordinates: 58°04′02″N 153°10′55″W

Location of Raspberry Island

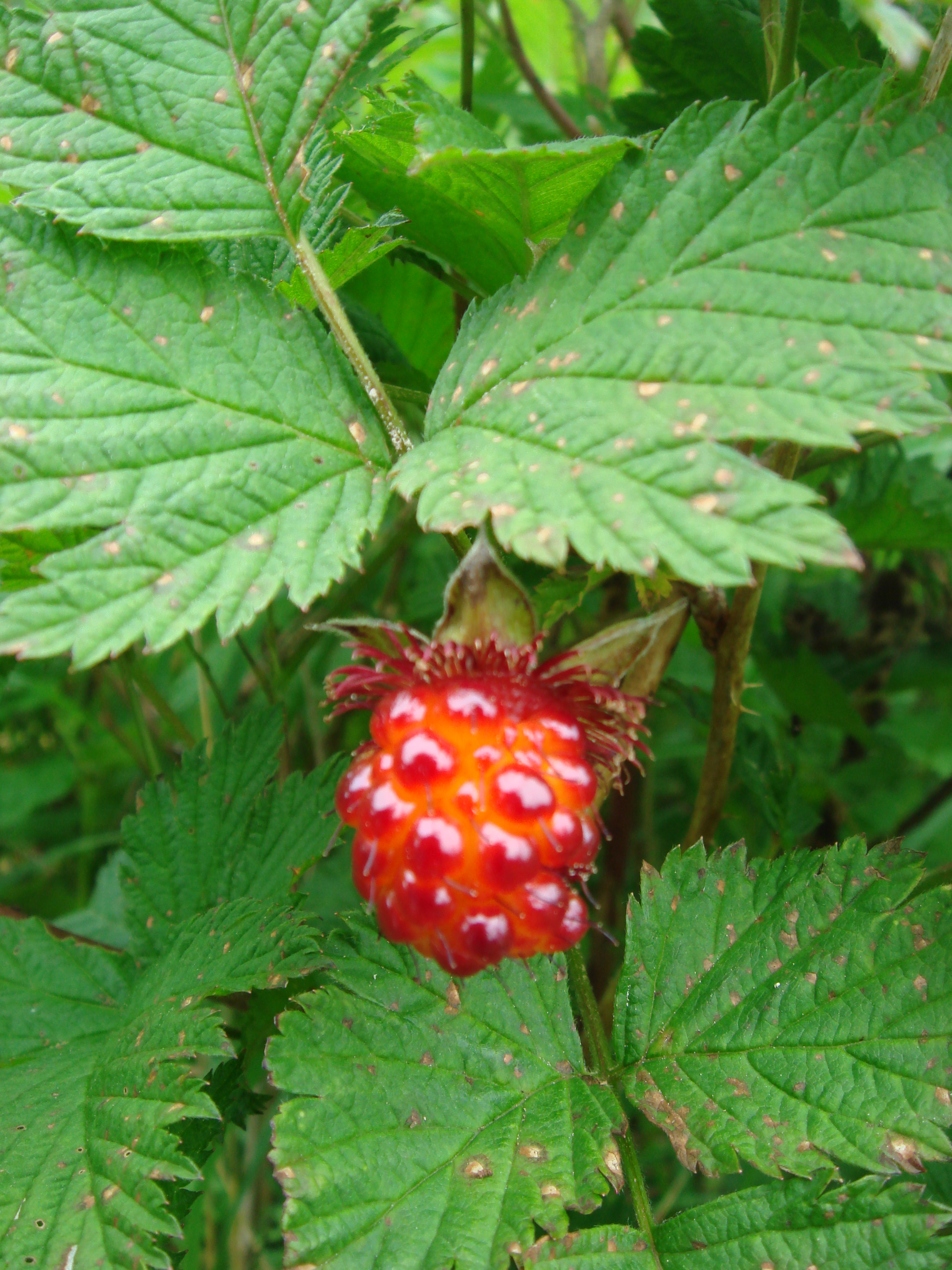
Salmonberries, which look like raspberries, are abundant on the island.

Raspberry Island (Russian: Малиновый) is an island of the Kodiak Archipelago located in the Gulf of Alaska in the U.S. state of Alaska. It is located two miles northwest of Whale Island, and just across the mile-wide Raspberry Strait from the southwestern end of Afognak. The island is separated from Kodiak Island by the Kupreanof Strait, with the Shelikof Strait to the northwest. Raspberry Island is 18 miles (29 km) long with a width that varies from 3 miles (4.8 km) to 8 miles (12.9 km). The highest point on the island is 3,300 ft (1000 m).

The island is considered part of the Aleneva census-designated place in the Kodiak Island Borough. The only permanent residents on Raspberry Island are located at Port Wakefield and Raspberry Island Remote Lodge which operate full service wilderness lodges. Power is provided via hydro power harnessed in nearby creeks. The nearest town is Kodiak, Alaska, an hour-and-a-half boat ride or a thirty-minute float plane ride away.

== Environment and wildlife ==
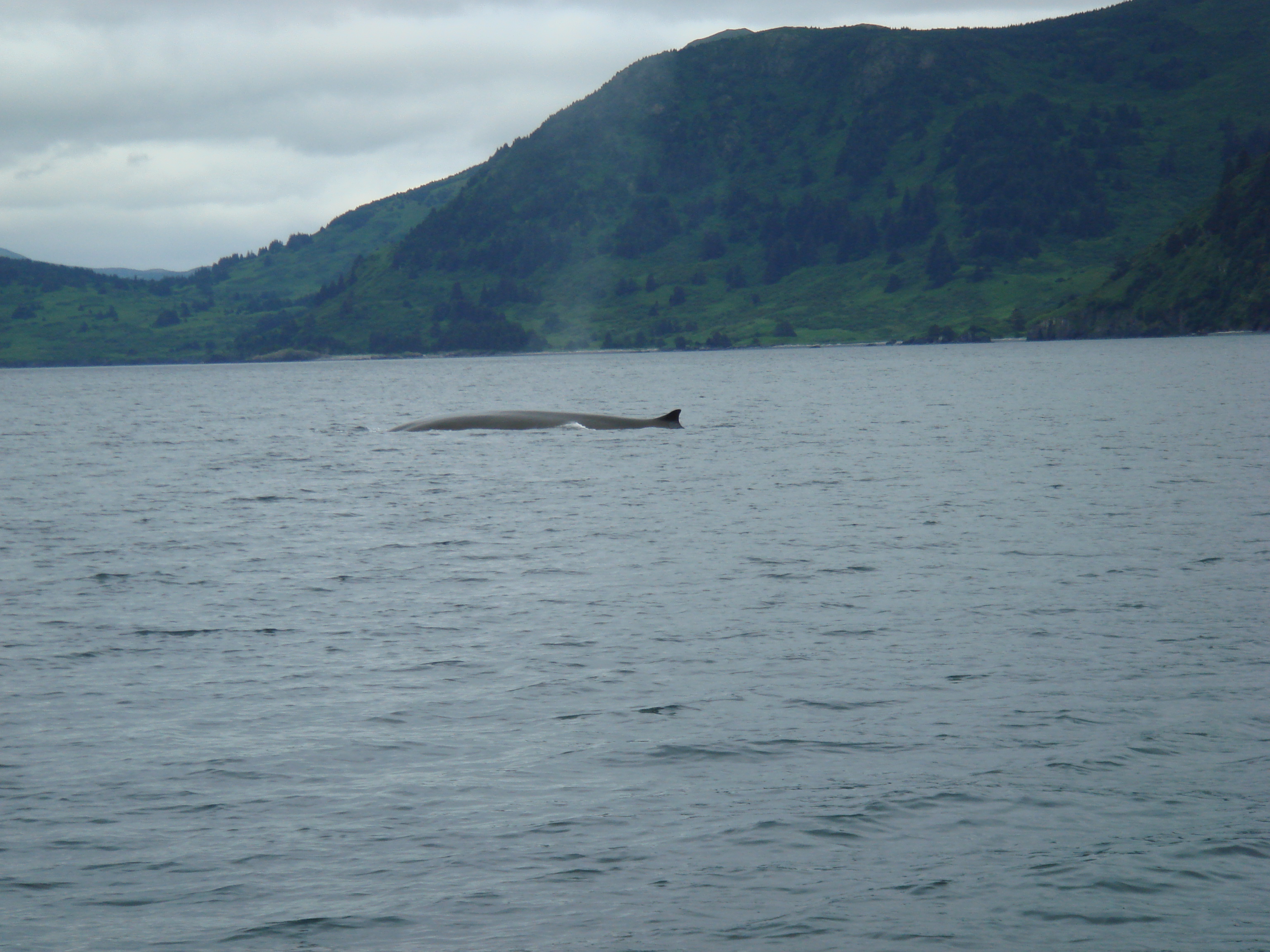
A fin whale surfacing in Raspberry Strait.

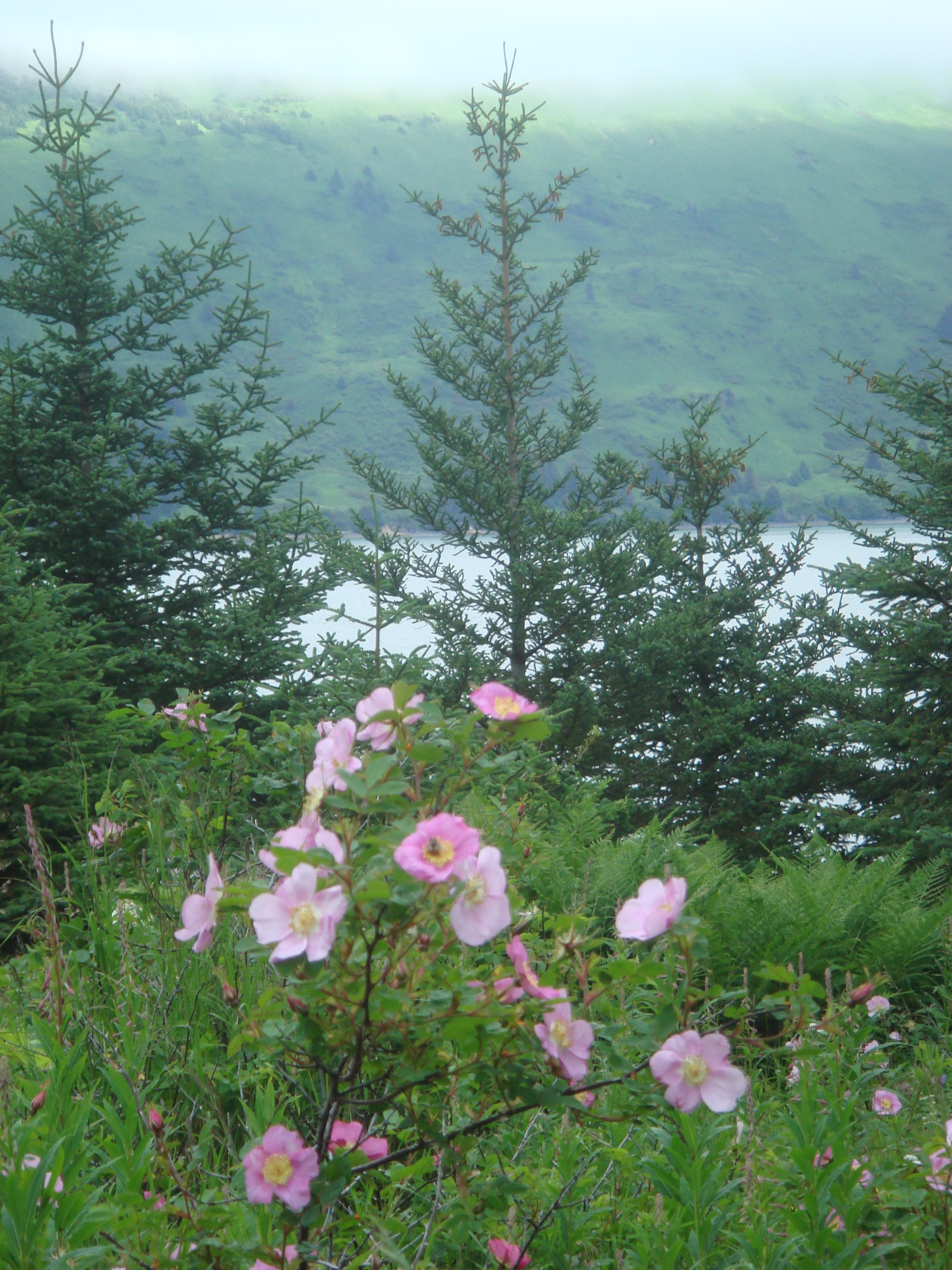
Mountain roses and sitka spruce overlooking Raspberry Strait.

Sitka spruce is one of the dominant trees on Raspberry Island. Spruce forests are interrupted by fields of salmonberry bushes, alders and wildflowers. Higher elevations have wild blueberry and cranberry bushes with more grasses. Wildlife of note on the island includes Sitka deer, red foxes and Kodiak bears, as well as tufted puffins and bald eagles. Afognak and Raspberry islands are the only locations in Alaska with elk populations. The island's Roosevelt Elk developed from eight calves translocated from Washington state's Olympic Peninsula in 1928. The elk have adapted well to the island, with some mature bulls weighing nearly 1,300 pounds (590 kg). The muskrat is another species that was successfully introduced to the island. Whales commonly meander down Raspberry Strait but must turn around because it becomes too shallow for them to pass all the way through. Kayakers take advantage of this phenomenon to wait for them to pass by again on their way back out to deeper water. Bald eagles are abundant.

== History ==
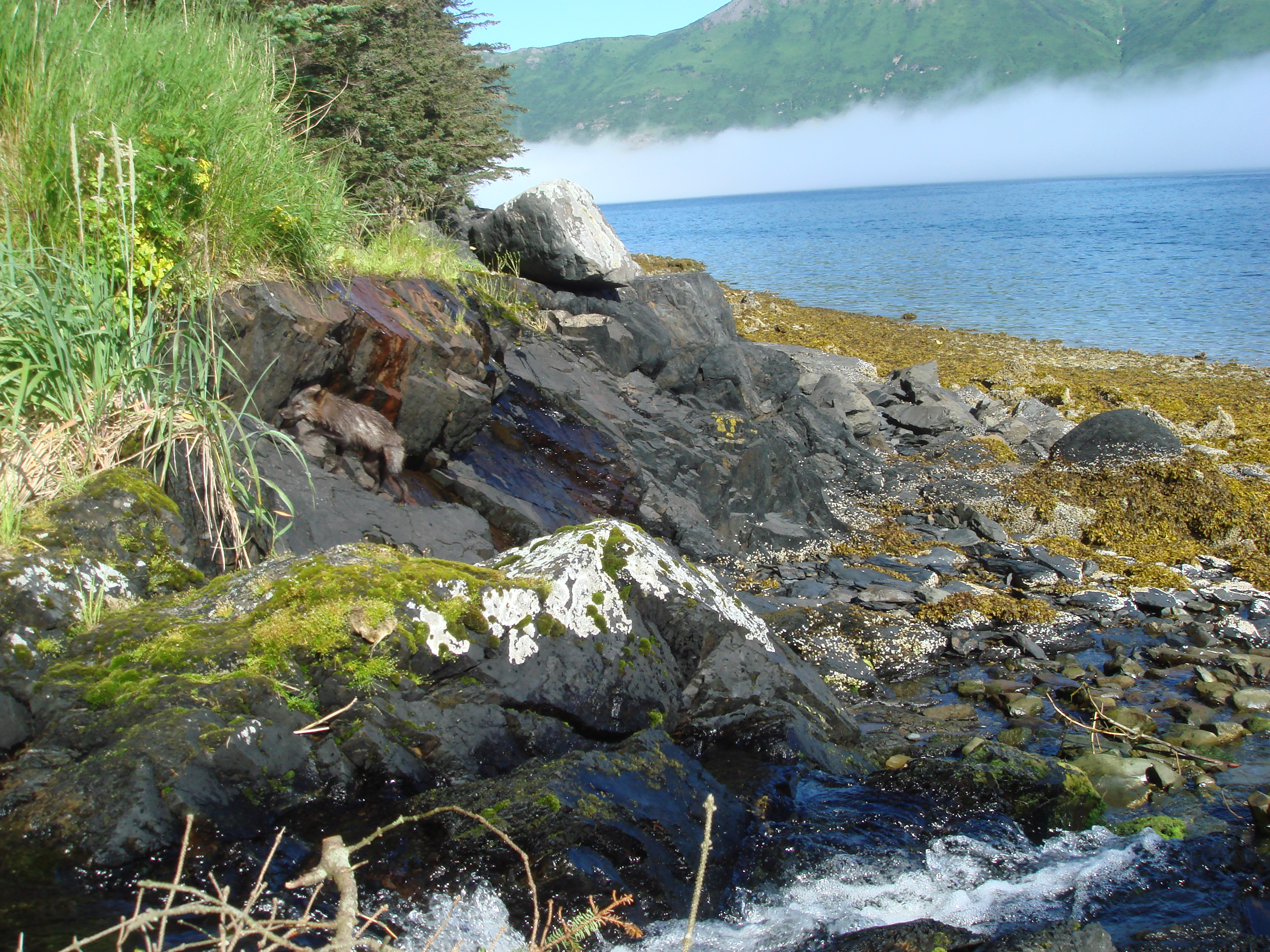
A fox searches for a meal along a rocky shore on Raspberry Island at low tide.

Originally inhabited by Aleut natives for over 7000 years, Russian fur traders took control of the islands in the 18th century and nearly wiped out the now abundant sea otters that can often be seen floating together in the strait. Several fishing canneries existed on the island including Port Wakefield and Northwest Cannery in the early 20th century. These went out of business several decades later and a fox fur farm existed on the Northwest Cannery site for a while. Deposits of placer gold were noted at Raspberry Beach as early as 1915. However, the last recorded mining activity on the beach was in 1935. The half-mile long beach is located on the northwest coast of the island at Drivers Bay. Much of the island is owned by the First Native Corporation and is uninhabited except for the two wilderness lodges that exist on land previously owned by the canneries.

== Economy ==
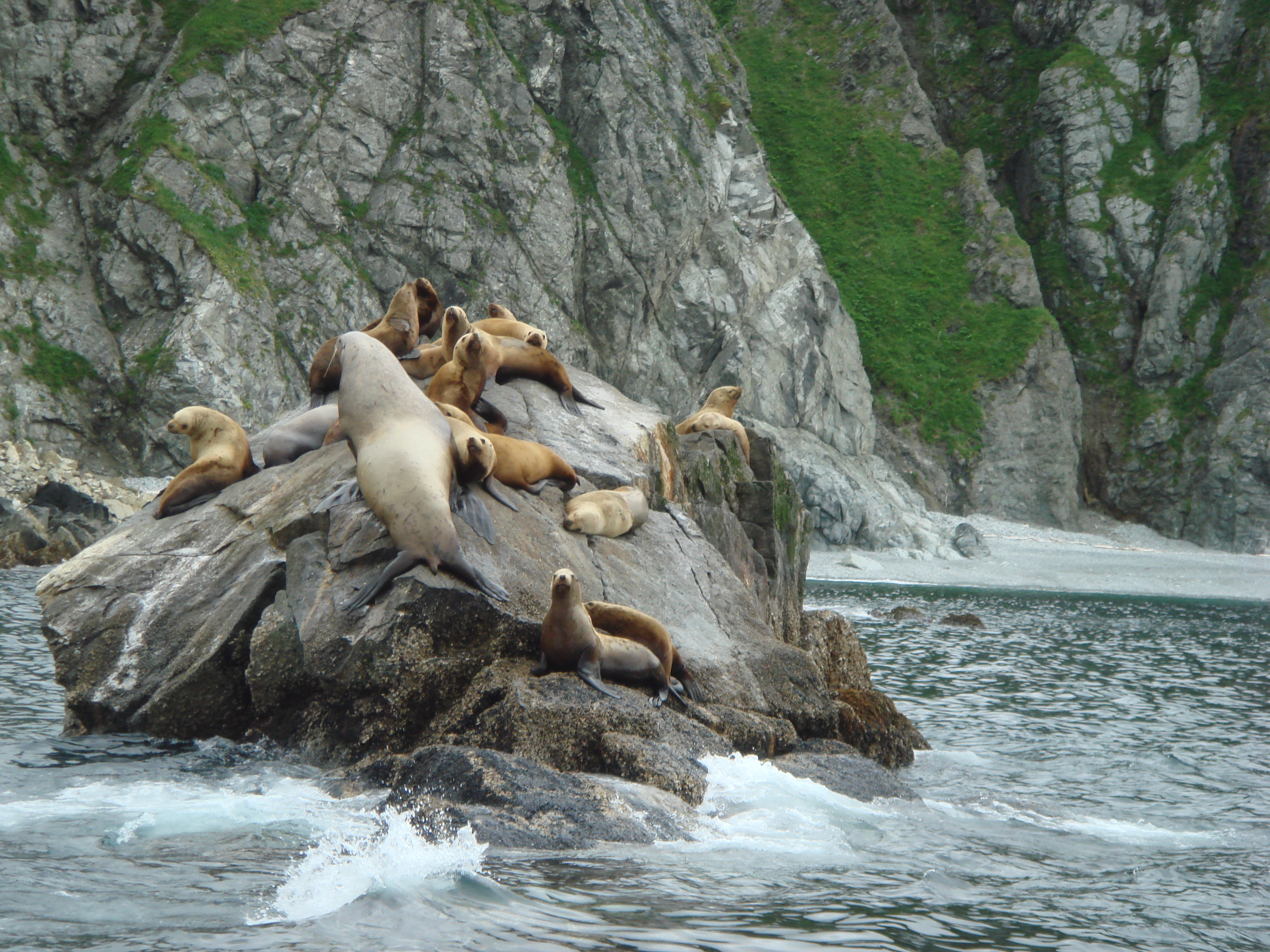
Sea lions gather just outside Raspberry Strait across from Raspberry Island near Afognak.

After the decline of the canneries, their land was eventually purchased and used by the two wilderness lodges as tourist destinations. They are unique because the land surrounding them and on the opposing Afognak Island is owned by the First Native corporation and almost completely uninhabited. Fishing vessels based in the city of Kodiak and Port Lions regularly fish the waters around Raspberry Island for the abundant salmon and halibut. Tourists frequent the two wilderness lodges that provide bear viewing, kayaking, extreme wilderness adventures and backpacking, ocean and fly fishing as well as hunting excursions. National Geographic filmed a true television story about two hunters that had separate bear encounters on Kodiak, one hunter was killed by a bear on nearby Uganik Island, the other stabbed the bear with a knife and then killed it with a gun on Raspberry Island and was able to drag himself out to be rescued by his son and Coast Guard airlift. Silver Salmon is one of the salmon spawning streams on the island available to fishermen and observers.

== Transportation ==
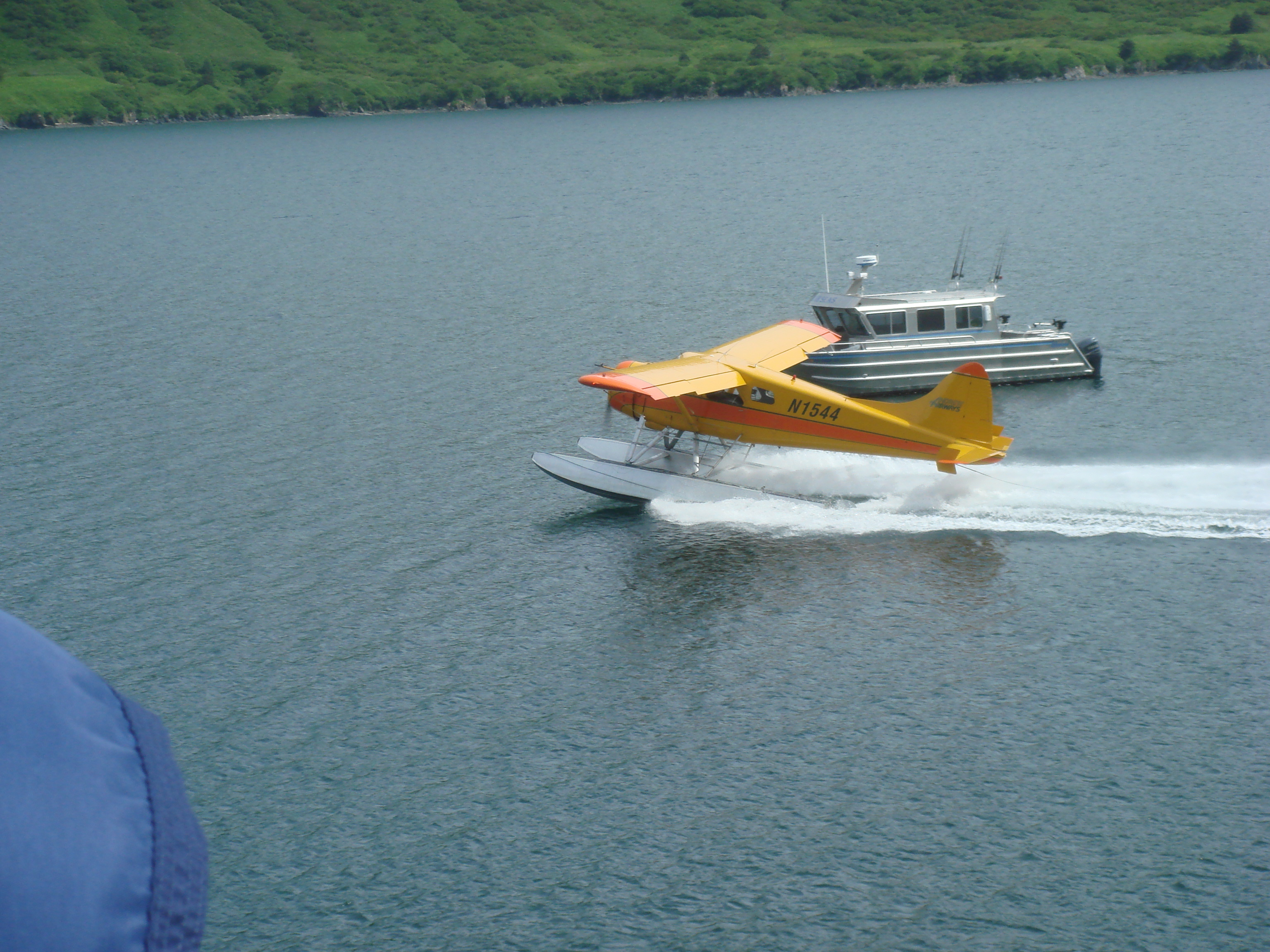
A floatplane takes guests from Raspberry Island Remote Lodge for a day of bear viewing on the Katmai coast.

There are no roads on Raspberry island except between the lodgings at one of the two wilderness lodges. Hiking trails do exist and are used by wildlife as well as the occasional human. Although it has been known to happen that people have arrived at Raspberry via kayak while on an extreme wilderness adventure, most transportation to and from the island is by floatplane or boat. All inhabitants, tourists, and supplies arrive at the island by first going through the city of Kodiak, Alaska, the nearest town, which is an hour-and-a-half boat ride or a thirty-minute float plane ride away.

== Additional images ==
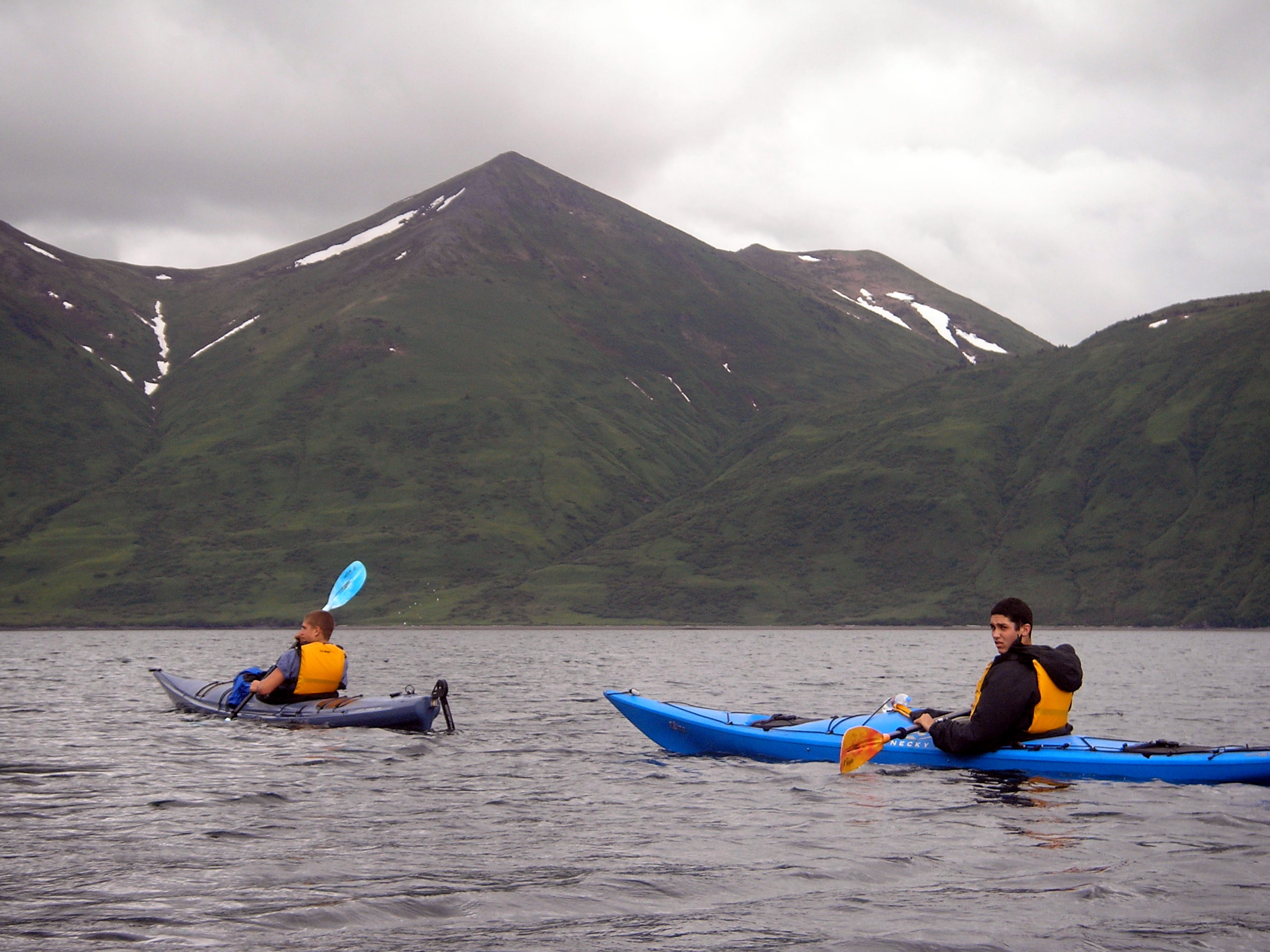
Kayakers off the coast of Raspberry Island.

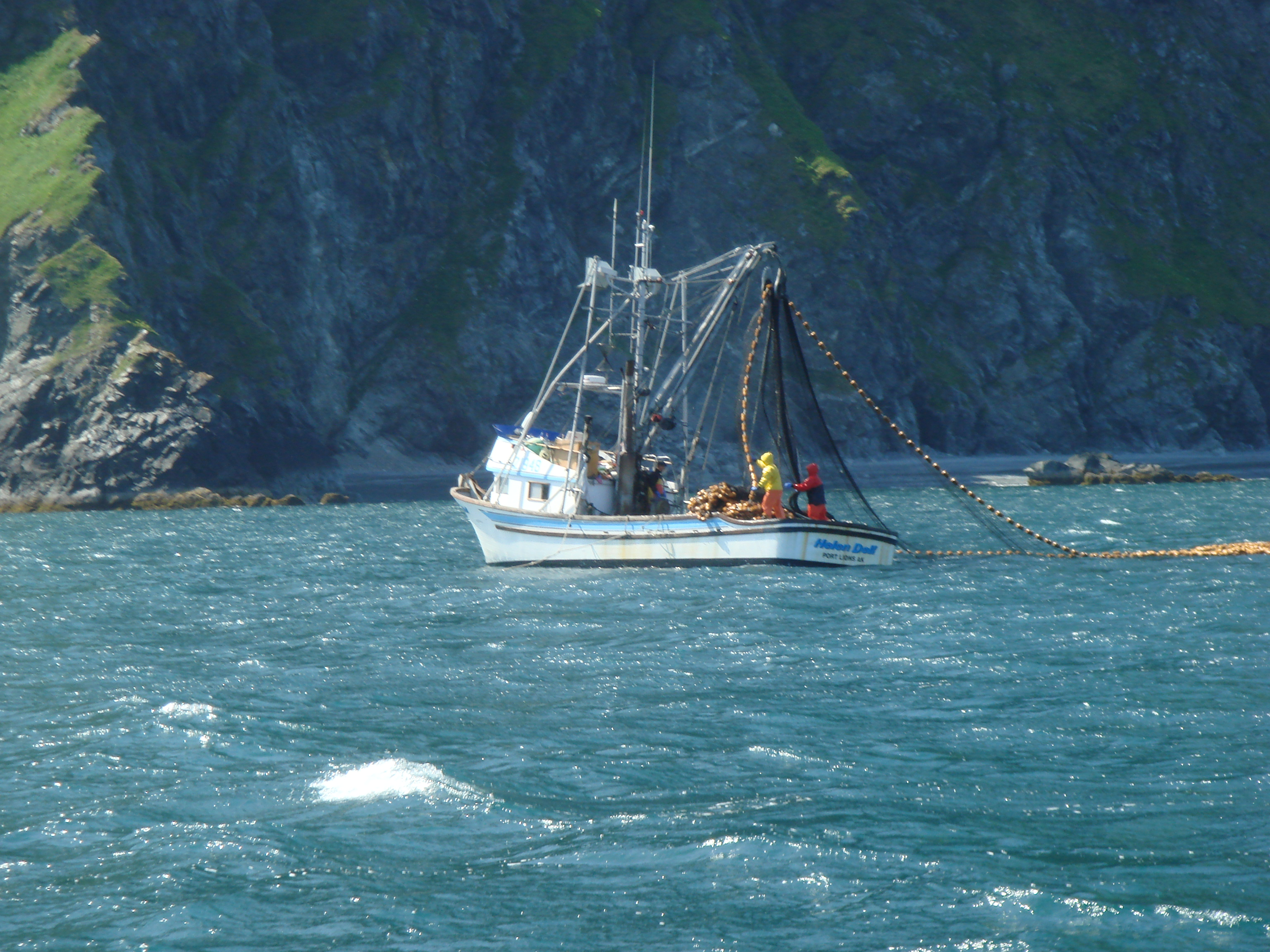
A seiner netting salmon in July off the coast of Raspberry Island, Alaska

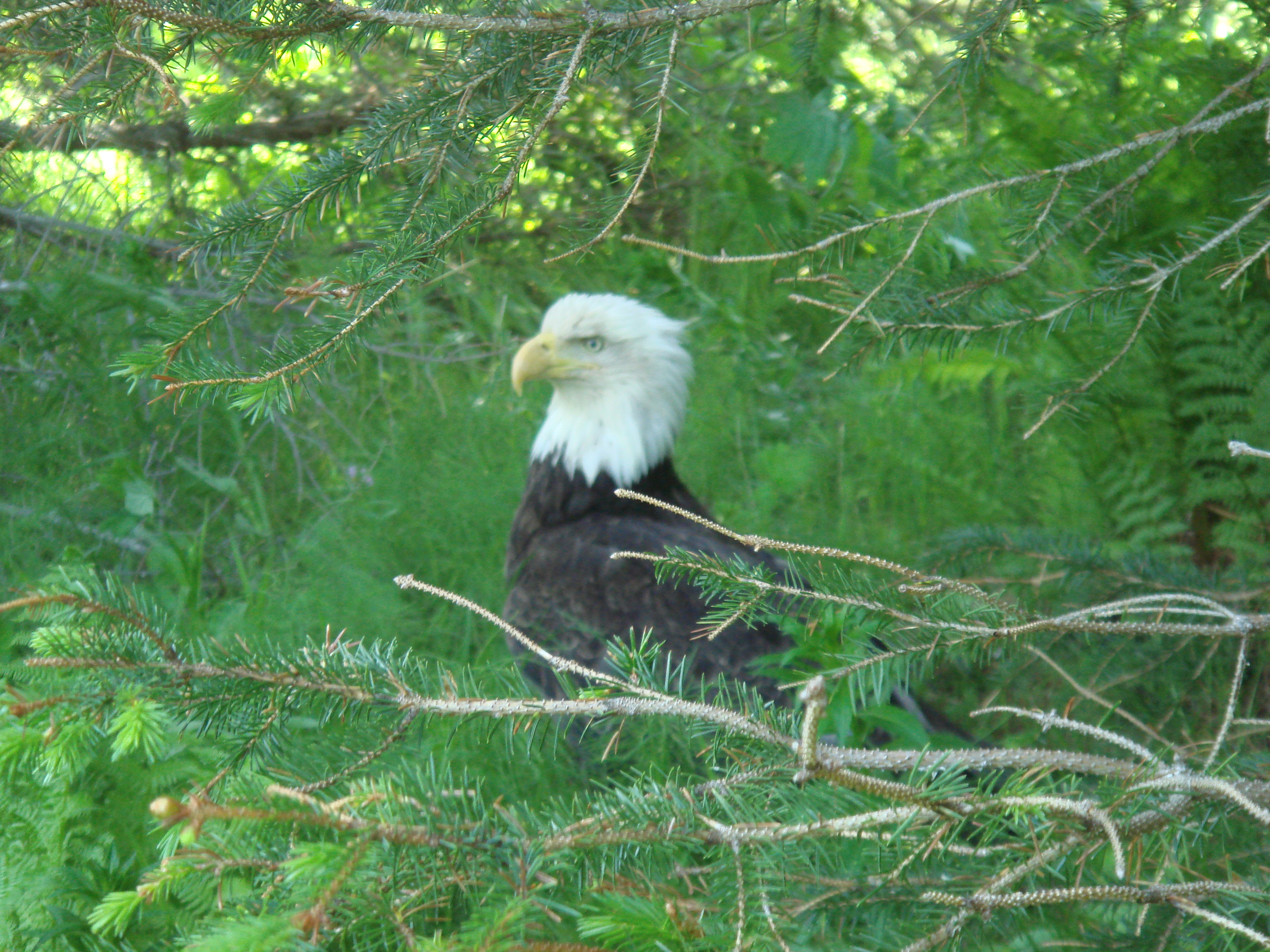
Bald eagles are abundant on Raspberry Island.

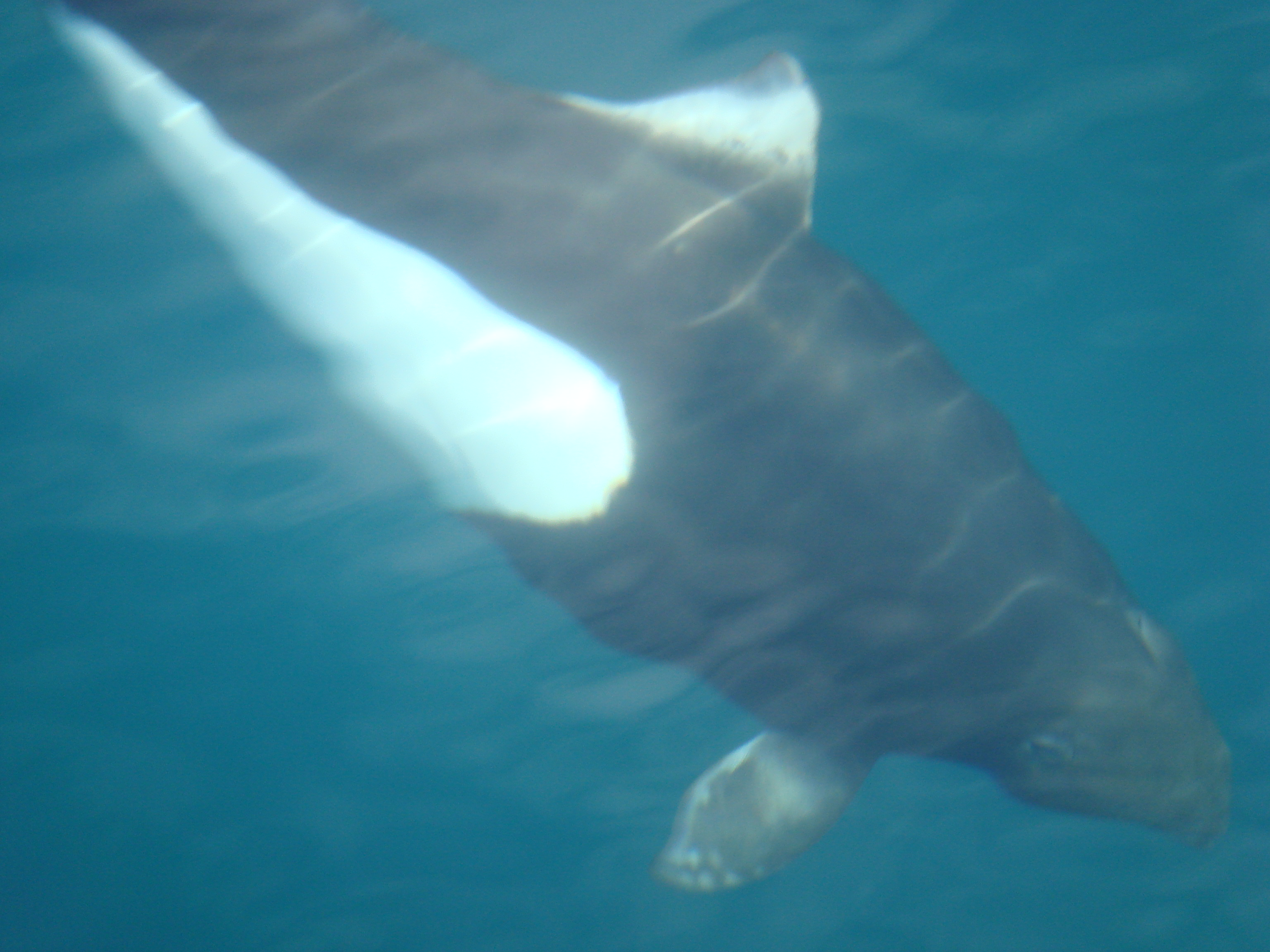
A wild Dall's porpoise on a calm day in the Shelikof Strait off the coast of Raspberry Island

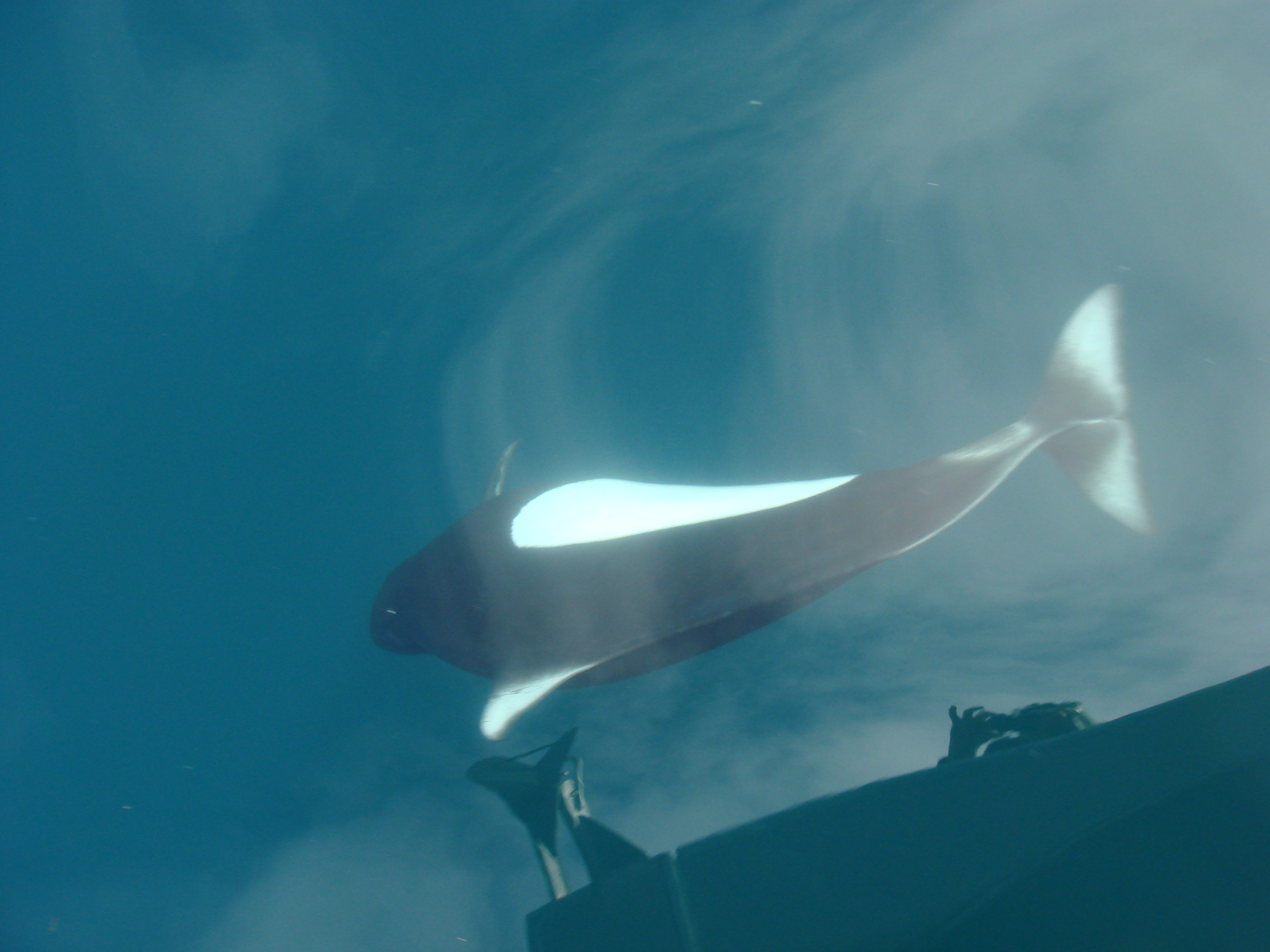
A wild Dall's porpoise plays in the shadow of a boat and photographer in the Shelikof Strait

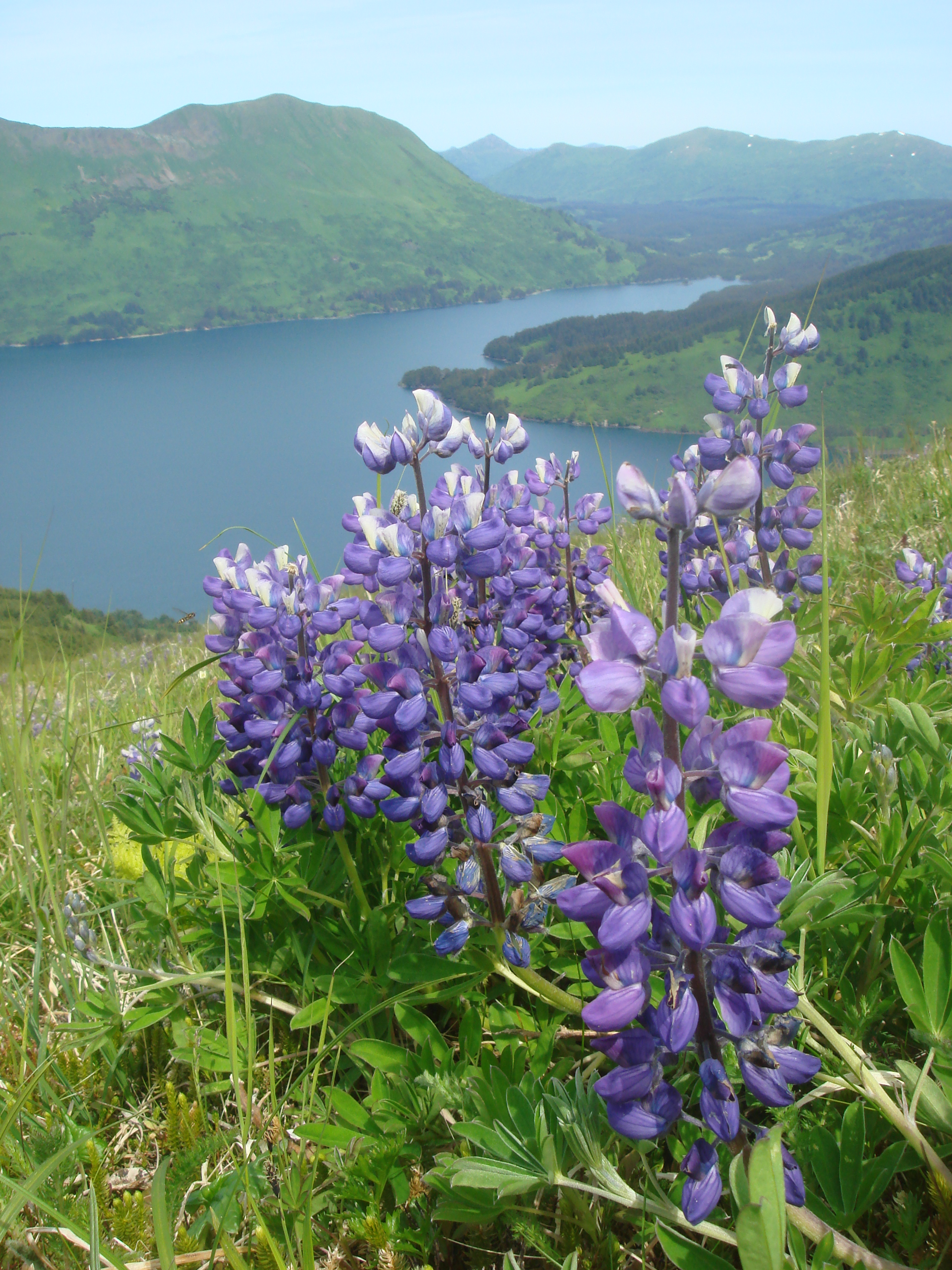
Lupin and other wildflowers cover the mountaintop on Raspberry Island. Cranberries, blueberries, bearberries and salmonberries are also found in abundance.

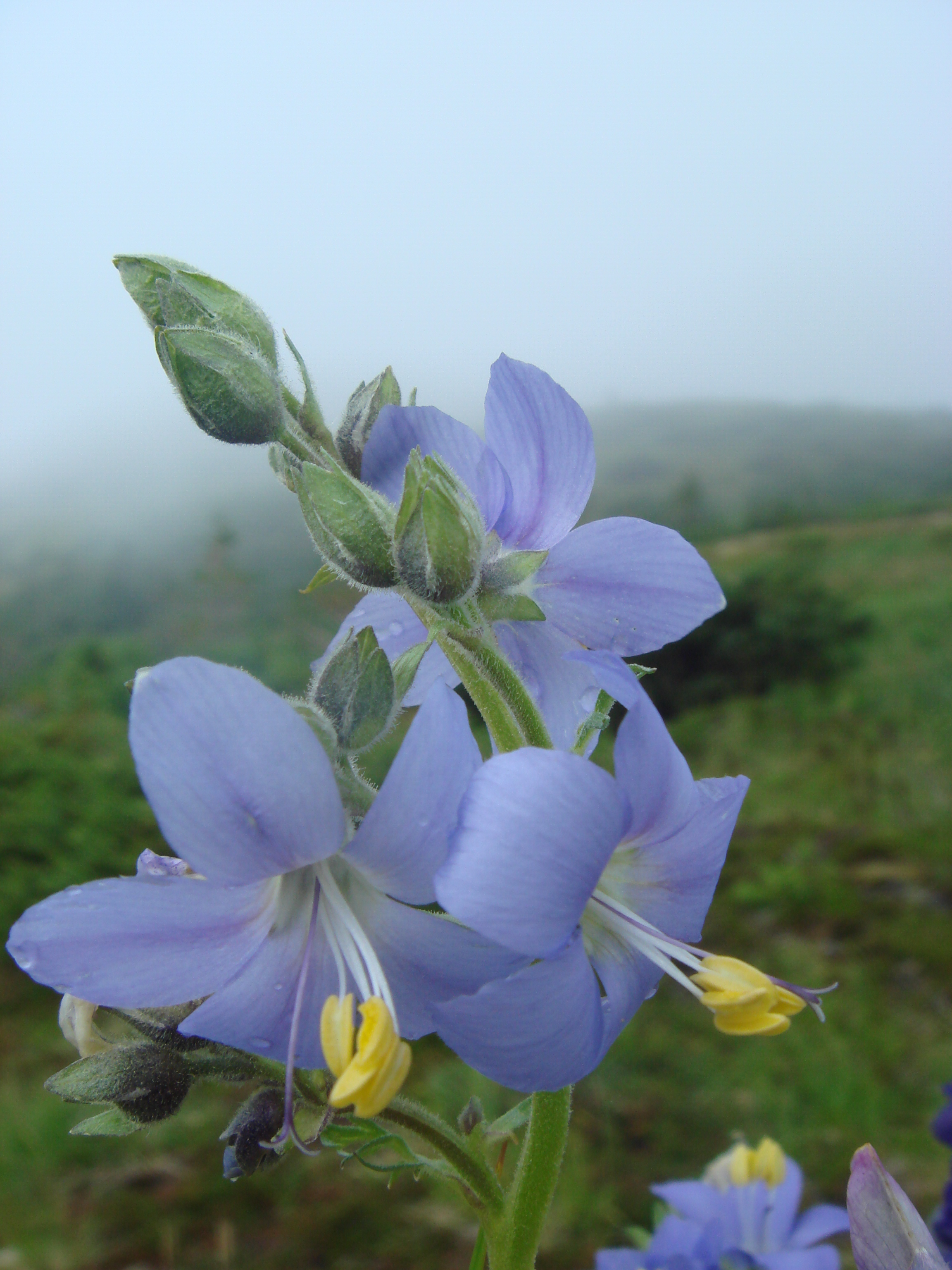
Wildflowers growing on the mountaintop of Raspberry Island

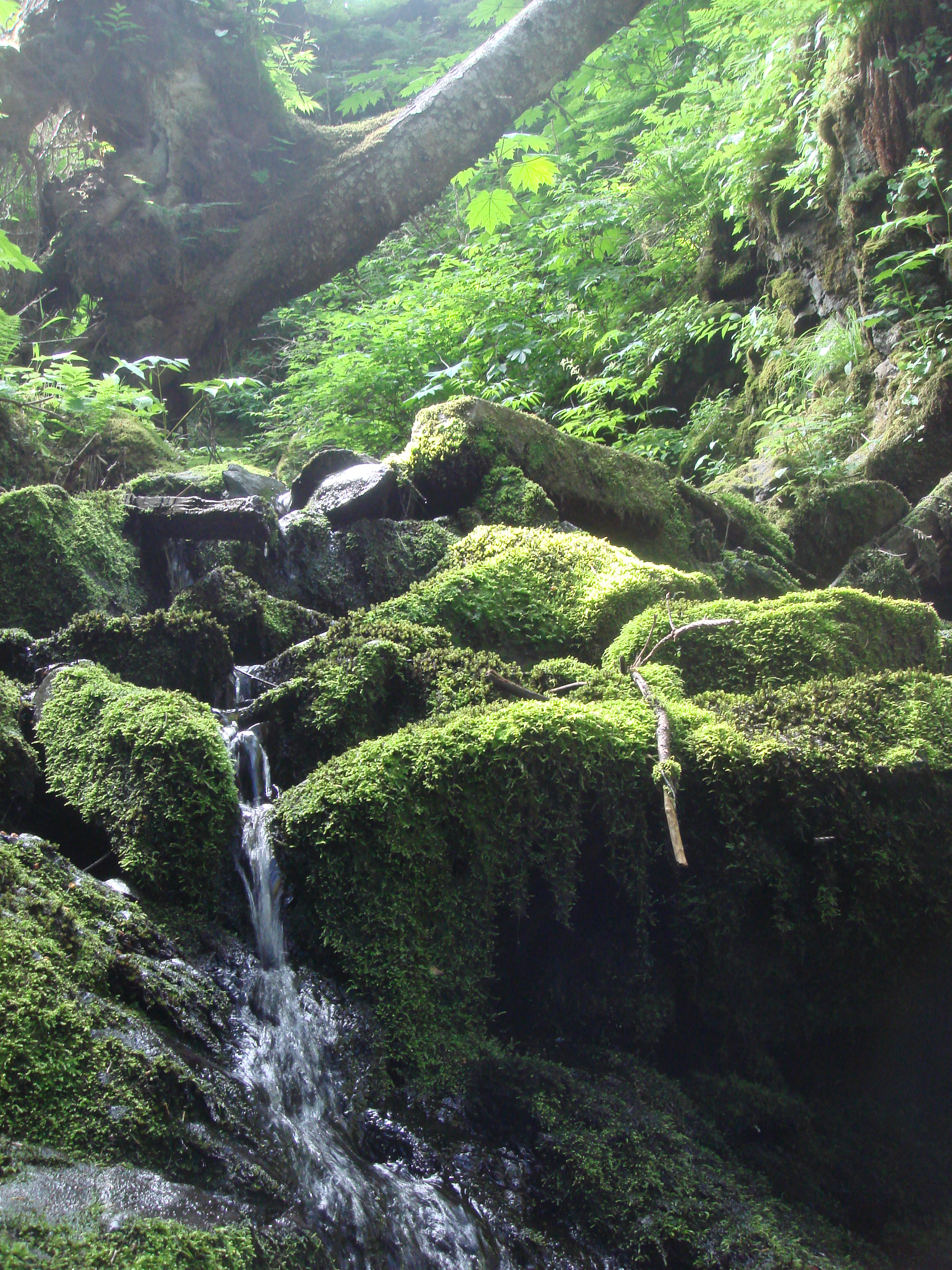
A mountain stream on Raspberry Island

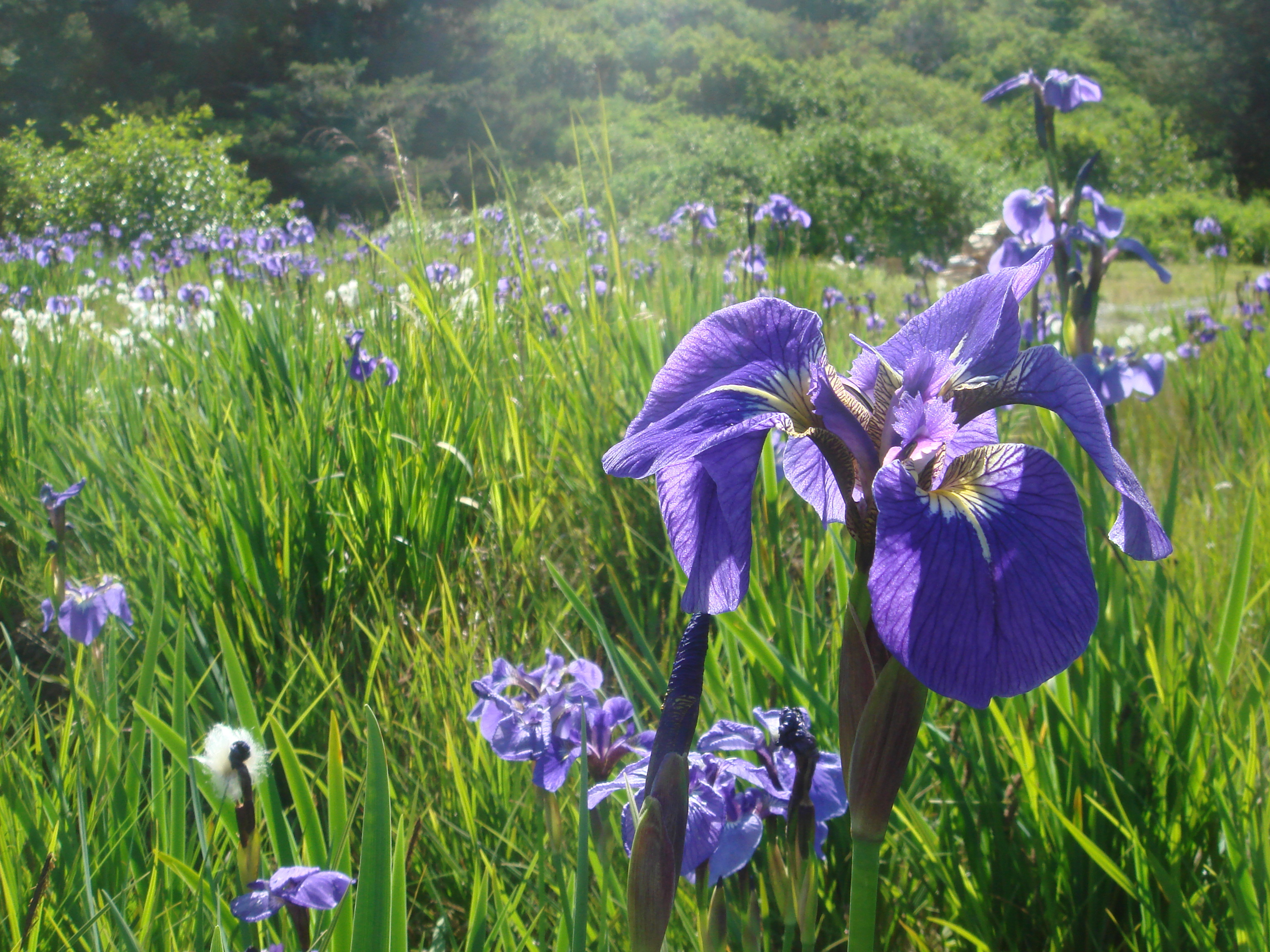
A field of purple iris on Raspberry Island

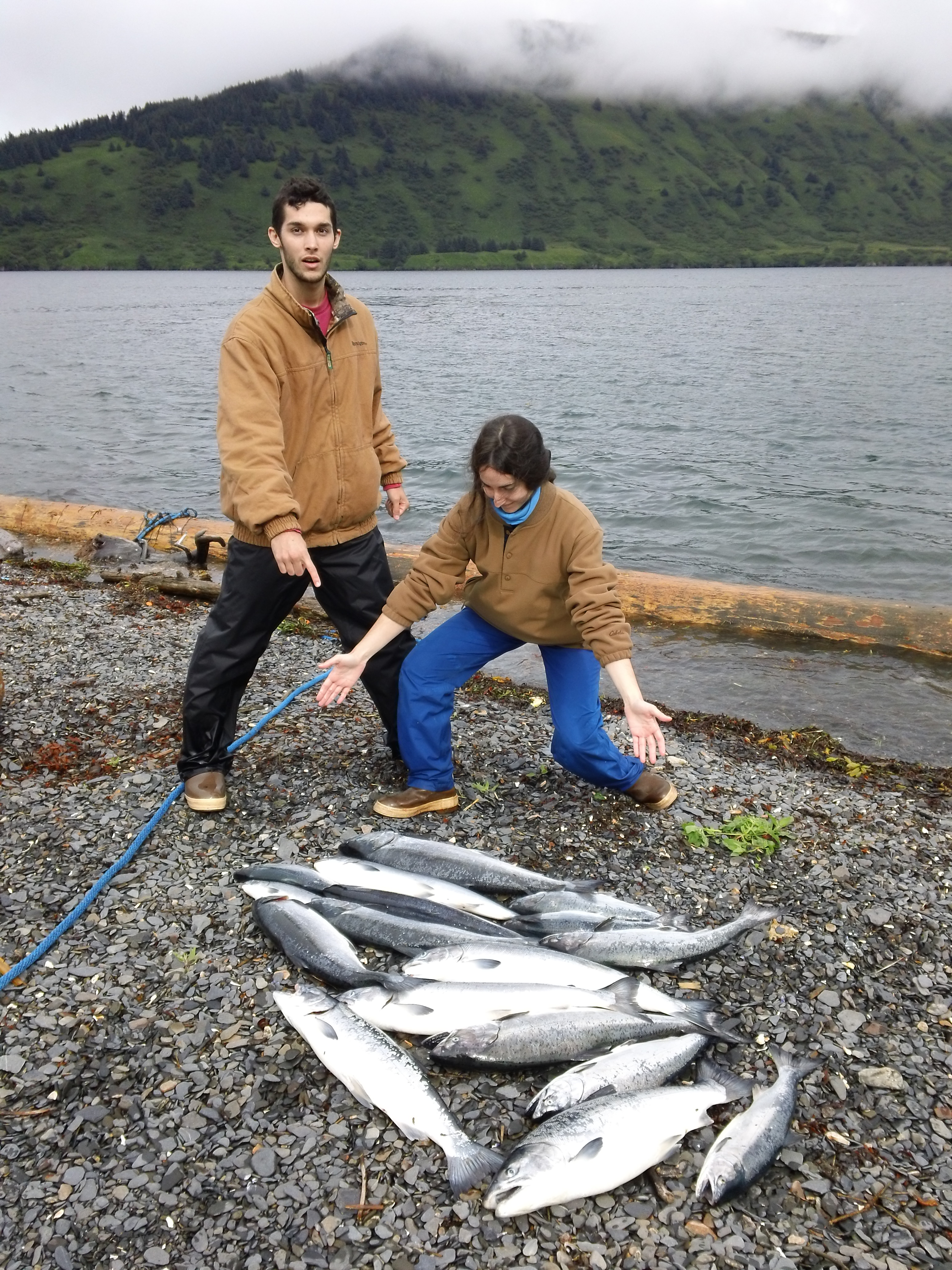
Silver salmon caught in the ocean just off Raspberry Island, Alaska
