= Shuyak Island =

Island in the Kodiak Archipelago, Alaska, U.S.

Coordinates: 58°31′31″N 152°30′17″W

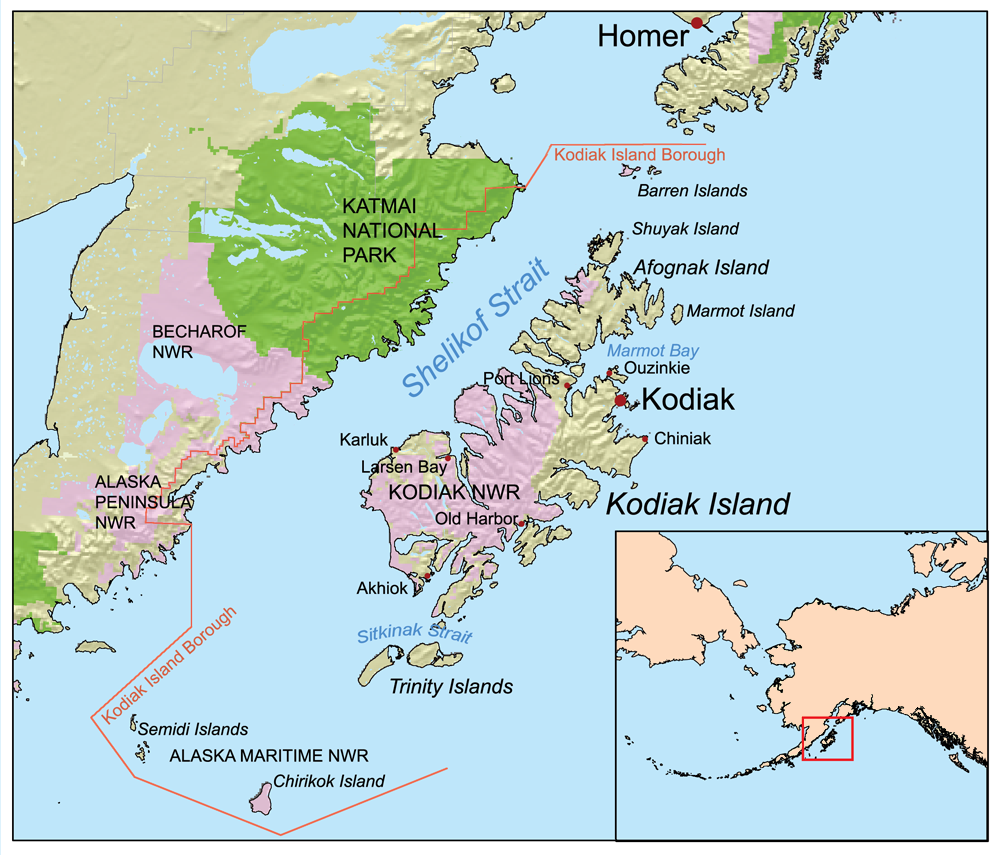
Kodiak Island map showing Shuyak Island

Shuyak Island is an island in the northern part of the Kodiak Archipelago in the state of Alaska, United States. It is located north of Afognak Island, separated from it by the narrow Shuyak Strait. The Stevenson Entrance to Cook Inlet separates it from the Barren Islands further north in the archipelago. The island has an area of 168.3 km^{2} (65 sq mi) and reported an official population of four persons in the 2000 census. Alaska's Shuyak Island State Park comprises most of the island's territory. The island's current major industry is tourism based on camping, recreational fishing, hunting, and kayaking. In the past, the island was home to a large fish processing plant at Port William, but that industry has declined with the advent of factory ships.
