= Kodiak Island Borough, Alaska =

Borough in Alaska, United States

- Borough
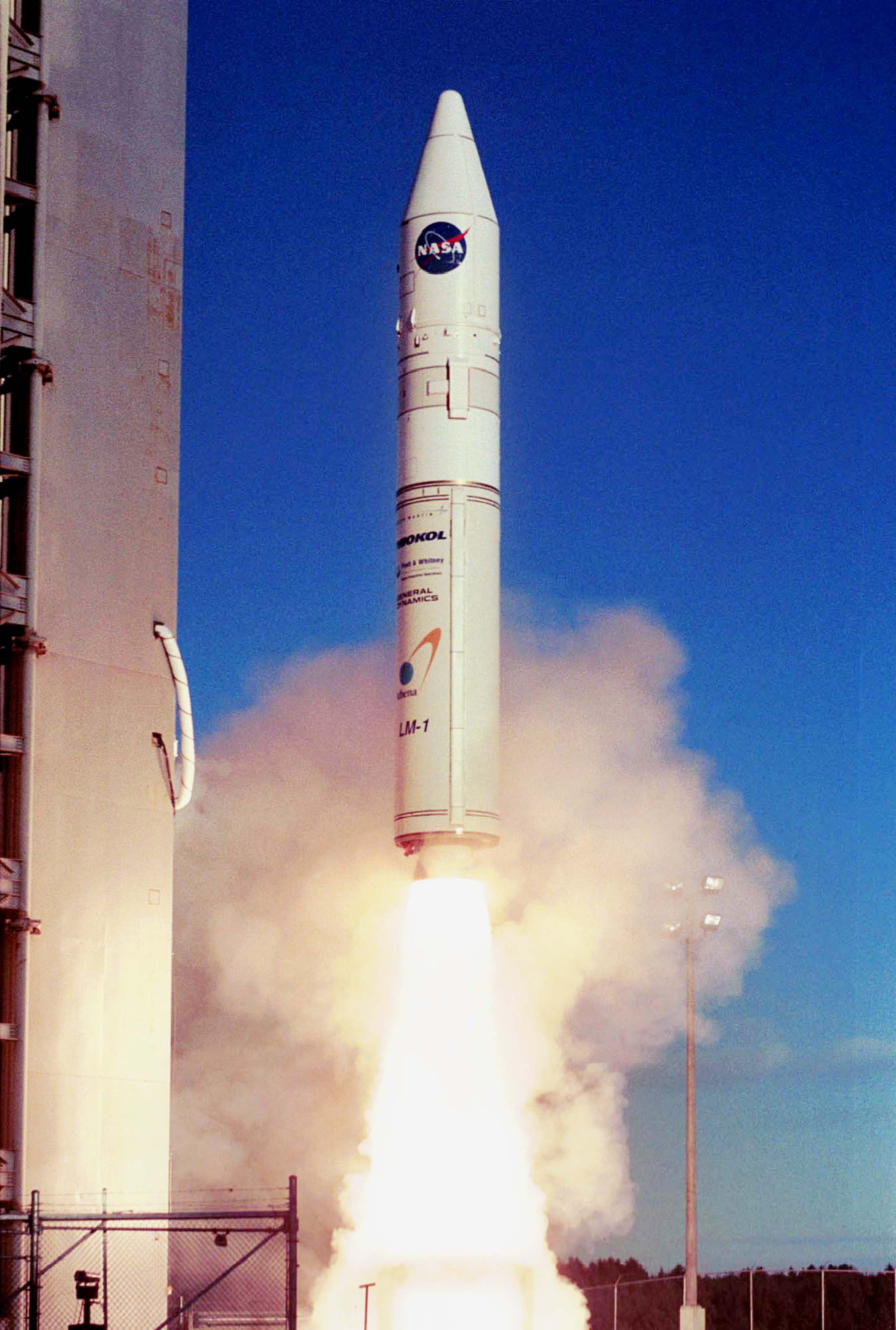
- Athena 1 rocket launching from Kodiak Island

- Seal

- Location within the U.S. state of Alaska
- Coordinates: 57°43′N 153°47′W
- Country: United States
- State: Alaska
- Incorporated: September 24, 1963
- Named for: Kodiak Island
- Seat: Kodiak
- Largest city: Kodiak

Area
  - Total: 12,022 sq mi (31,140 km^{2})
  - Land: 6,550 sq mi (17,000 km^{2})
  - Water: 5,472 sq mi (14,170 km^{2}) 45.5%

Population (2020)
  - Total: 13,101
  - Estimate (2025): 12,387 ▼
  - Density: 2.00/sq mi (0.772/km^{2})
- Time zone: UTC−9 (Alaska)
  - Summer (DST): UTC−8 (ADT)
- Congressional district: At-large
- Website: www.kodiakak.us

Kodiak Island Borough is a borough in the U.S. state of Alaska. At the 2020 census, the population was 13,101, down from 13,592 in 2010. The borough seat is Kodiak.

== Geography ==
The borough has a total area of 12,022 square miles (31,140 km^{2}), of which 6,550 square miles (17,000 km^{2}) is land and 5,472 square miles (14,170 km^{2}) (45.5%) is water. Most of the land area belongs to Kodiak Island, but a thin strip of coastal area on the western part of the Alaska Peninsula and other nearby islands (Afognak Island, Shuyak Island, Marmot Island, Raspberry Island, Little Raspberry Island, Whale Island, Spruce Island, Woody Island, Uganik Island, Sitkalidak Island, Tugidak Island, Sitkinak Island, Chirikof Island, and the Semidi Islands) are also in the borough. The waterway between the island and mainland is known as the Shelikof Strait. South of the island are the open waters of the Pacific Ocean, so the site is considered good for launching certain types of satellites. The Kodiak Launch Complex is ideal for putting satellites in Molniya and polar orbits.

=== Adjacent boroughs ===
- Kenai Peninsula Borough, Alaska - north
- Lake and Peninsula Borough, Alaska - northwest

=== National protected areas ===
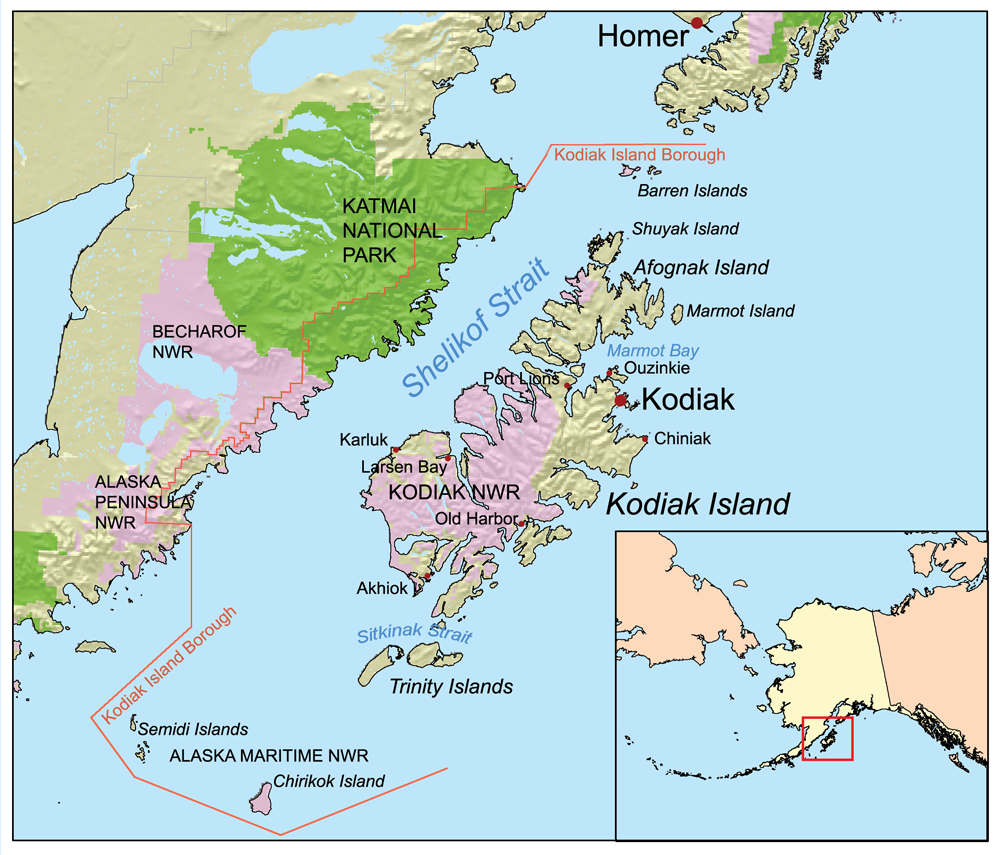
Map of the Kodiak Island Borough and surrounding area.

- Alaska Maritime National Wildlife Refuge (parts of Alaska Peninsula and Gulf of Alaska units)
  - Barren Islands
  - Semidi Wilderness
    - Semidi Islands
  - Trinity Islands
    - Sitkinak Island
    - Tugidak Island
- Alaska Peninsula National Wildlife Refuge (part)
- Becharof National Wildlife Refuge (part)
  - Becharof Wilderness (part)
- Chugach National Forest (part)
- Katmai National Park and Preserve (part)
  - Katmai Wilderness (part)
- Kodiak National Wildlife Refuge

== Demographics ==
Historical population
Census	Pop.	Note	%±
1960	7,174		—
1970	9,409		31.2%
1980	9,939		5.6%
1990	13,309		33.9%
2000	13,913		4.5%
2010	13,592		−2.3%
2020	13,101		−3.6%
2025 (est.)	12,387	▼	−5.4%
U.S. Decennial Census; 1790-1960 1900-1990; 1990-2000 2010-2020

=== 2020 census ===
Kodiak Island Borough, Alaska – Racial and ethnic composition Note: the US Census treats Hispanic/Latino as an ethnic category. This table excludes Latinos from the racial categories and assigns them to a separate category. Hispanics/Latinos may be of any race.
Race / Ethnicity (NH = Non-Hispanic)	Pop 2000	Pop 2010	Pop 2020	% 2000	% 2010	% 2020
White alone (NH)	8,001	7,137	6,291	57.51%	52.51%	48.02%
Black or African American alone (NH)	129	85	85	0.93%	0.63%	0.65%
Native American or Alaska Native alone (NH)	1,997	1,759	1,759	14.35%	12.94%	13.43%
Asian alone (NH)	2,193	2,620	2,781	15.76%	19.28%	21.23%
Native Hawaiian or Pacific Islander alone (NH)	105	86	107	0.75%	0.63%	0.82%
Other race alone (NH)	15	14	74	0.11%	0.10%	0.56%
Mixed race or Multiracial (NH)	625	895	980	4.49%	6.58%	7.48%
Hispanic or Latino (any race)	848	996	1,024	6.10%	7.33%	7.82%
Total	13,913	13,592	13,101	100.00%	100.00%	100.00%

As of the 2020 census, the county had a population of 13,101. The median age was 35.2 years. 24.6% of residents were under the age of 18 and 12.3% of residents were 65 years of age or older. For every 100 females there were 114.3 males, and for every 100 females age 18 and over there were 113.3 males age 18 and over.

The racial makeup of the county was 50.1% White, 0.7% Black or African American, 13.9% American Indian and Alaska Native, 21.4% Asian, 0.9% Native Hawaiian and Pacific Islander, 3.0% from some other race, and 10.0% from two or more races. Hispanic or Latino residents of any race comprised 7.8% of the population.

72.7% of residents lived in urban areas, while 27.3% lived in rural areas.

There were 4,612 households in the county, of which 37.2% had children under the age of 18 living with them and 21.6% had a female householder with no spouse or partner present. About 24.6% of all households were made up of individuals and 7.6% had someone living alone who was 65 years of age or older.

There were 5,825 housing units, of which 20.8% were vacant. Among occupied housing units, 56.4% were owner-occupied and 43.6% were renter-occupied. The homeowner vacancy rate was 1.4% and the rental vacancy rate was 10.8%.

=== 2000 census ===
As of the census of 2000, there were 13,913 people, 4,424 households, and 3,256 families residing in the borough. The population density was 2 people per square mile (0.77 people/km^{2}). There were 5,159 housing units at an average density of 1 per square mile (0.39/km^{2}). The racial makeup of the borough was 59.69% White, 0.96% Black or African American, 14.58% Native American, 16.04% Asian, 0.79% Pacific Islander, 2.78% from other races, and 5.16% from two or more races. 6.10% of the population were Hispanic or Latino of any race. 13.10% reported speaking Tagalog at home, a language of the Philippines, while 5.28% speak Spanish.

There were 4,424 households, out of which 45.90% had children under the age of 18 living with them, 59.70% were married couples living together, 8.80% had a female householder with no husband present, and 26.40% were non-families. 19.90% of all households were made up of individuals, and 3.70% had someone living alone who was 65 years of age or older. The average household size was 3.07 and the average family size was 3.52.

In the borough the population was spread out, with 32.40% under the age of 18, 8.30% from 18 to 24, 34.00% from 25 to 44, 20.40% from 45 to 64, and 4.80% who were 65 years of age or older. The median age was 32 years. For every 100 females, there were 112.40 males. For every 100 females age 18 and over, there were 117.40 males.

== Communities ==
=== Cities ===
- Akhiok
- Kodiak (Borough seat)
- Larsen Bay
- Old Harbor
- Ouzinkie
- Port Lions

=== Census-designated places ===
- Aleneva
- Chiniak
- Karluk
- Kodiak Station
- Mill Bay
- Womens Bay

=== Census Subareas ===
- Kodiak Island

== Government and politics ==
United States presidential election results for Kodiak Island Borough, Alaska
Year	Republican		Democratic		Third party(ies)	
Year	No.	%	No.	%	No.	%
1960	631	42.12%	867	57.88%	0	0.00%
1964	399	25.22%	1,183	74.78%	0	0.00%
1968	987	47.11%	861	41.10%	247	11.79%
1972	1,172	56.10%	859	41.12%	58	2.78%
1976	1,491	56.63%	1,014	38.51%	128	4.86%
1980	1,589	47.83%	1,028	30.95%	705	21.22%
1984	3,212	69.74%	1,237	26.86%	157	3.41%
1988	2,608	64.24%	1,349	33.23%	103	2.54%
1992	2,293	41.80%	1,471	26.82%	1,721	31.38%
1996	2,708	55.95%	1,576	32.56%	556	11.49%
2000	3,861	65.46%	1,543	26.16%	494	8.38%
2004	2,698	65.45%	1,349	32.73%	75	1.82%
2008	3,979	63.40%	2,102	33.49%	195	3.11%
2012	2,969	57.46%	2,056	39.79%	142	2.75%
2016	3,071	56.11%	2,001	36.56%	401	7.33%
2020	3,756	56.84%	2,523	38.18%	329	4.98%
2024	3,547	56.61%	2,469	39.40%	250	3.99%

Kodiak Island Borough is strongly Republican, having last voted for a Democrat in 1964.

== See also ==
- List of airports in the Kodiak Island Borough
