= Uganik Island =

Island in Alaska, United States

Coordinates: 57°53′13″N 153°21′22″W

Uganik Island is an island lying just off the west coast of Kodiak Island in the Kodiak Archipelago of Alaska, United States. The island has a land area of 146.7 km^{2} (56.64 sq mi) and is uninhabited. However, salmon setnetters occupy fish camp sites along the island shore from June–September each year. The island comprises part of the Kodiak National Wildlife Refuge. Hunting and fishing are allowed seasonally, with a proper license.

Uganik Island Archaeology: http://alutiiqmuseum.org/index.php?option=com_content&task=view&id=372&Itemid=136
