= Chirikof Island =

Island in Alaska, United States

Chirikof
Native name: Ukamok, Остров Чирикова
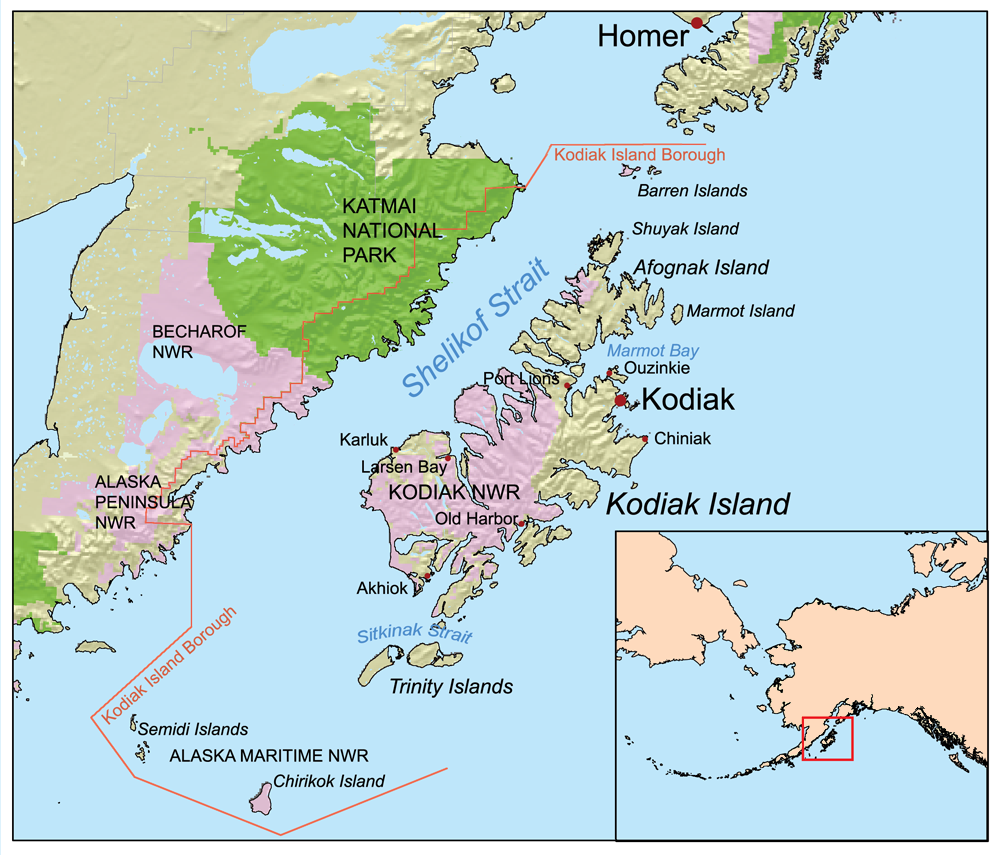
- Kodiak Island map showing Chirikof Island
- Interactive map of Chirikof

Geography
- Location: Pacific Ocean
- Coordinates: 55°49′30″N 155°37′19″W
- Archipelago: Kodiak Archipelago
- Area: 114.787 km^{2} (44.320 sq mi)
- Highest elevation: 300 m (1000 ft)
- Highest point: Highest Point

Administration
- United States
- State: Alaska
- Borough: Kodiak Island

Chirikof Island (Russian: Остров Чирикова, romanized: Ostrov Chirikova) is located in the Gulf of Alaska approximately 80 miles (130 km) southwest of Kodiak Island.

== Terrain ==
Chirikof Island consists of 33,000 acres (13,000 ha) of grasses and sedges. Treeless, it lies west of the western tree line in Alaska. The island is shaped like a webbed duck foot with the heel to the north and the webbing to the south. The seas around Chirikof are treacherous and the island has a history of shipwrecks. The south shore has a wide beach suitable for aircraft landings and cautious watercraft landings. The island is open to general public access. Commercial carriers need a permit to visit; personal planes or boats need no permit.

== Habitation ==
The first human inhabitants of the island were the Old Islanders, 4000-2000 BP (before present, i.e., before 1950.) A subsistence village existed up to the late 19th century, when it was succeeded first by fox farming and then by cattle farming. There has generally been continuous human habitation of Chirikof, relieved by short periods of abandonment. In 1980, the island became part of the Alaska Maritime Wildlife Refuge. The only inhabitants now are a herd of perhaps 700-800 feral cattle. Cattle have been present on the island since the late 19th century. In the 21st century, the herd has become the subject of an ongoing controversy between a small group of Kodiak ranchers and the US Fish and Wildlife Service, which manages the refuge. (See National interest lands below.)

== Names ==
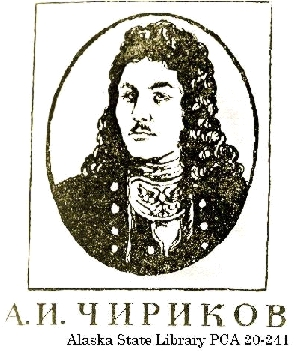
Alexei Chirikov, the namesake of the island.

Vitus Bering, captain of the St. Peter, and Alexei Chirikov, captain of the St. Paul, sailed from Kamchatka in 1741 with charts that called the island Tummenoi, a Russian word meaning foggy. The log of the St. Peter recorded a sighting of the island on August 2, 1741, which was St. Stephen's day. For this reason, Bering renamed the island St. Stephen Island. Bering's ship and Chirikof's had become separated early in the voyage and Chirikof never saw the island. Nonetheless, in 1794, explorer George Vancouver renamed the island Chirikof Island, observing that Capt. Chirikof's "labors in the arduous task of discovery do not appear to have been thus commemorated." Alutiiqs of the area still call the island Ukamok (ooo-KA-mok) for the ground squirrels common there.

== Russian-American Company ==
In 1799 the Russian-American Company was given a charter by Tsar Paul I to govern the territory of Alaska and manage the exploitation of its resources. The company had already established a permanent colony for European settlers on Kodiak Island. Supported at first by the fur trade, the Kodiak colonists later pursued cattle ranching and fox farming. During the Russian period (i.e., 1740s to 1867) a population of 60-100 villagers lived a subsistence life on nearby Chirikof. The villagers were of Alutiiq, Tlingit, Russian, and Western European extraction. They worshiped in a small Russian orthodox church. The village was abandoned soon after the Russian church called the only priest on the island back to Kodiak in 1870.

== Alaska Commercial Company ==
Alaska Commercial Company acquired the assets of the Russian-American Company in 1867 when Russia sold the territory to America. In 1887, an ACC subsidiary was formed to breed blue foxes on Chirikof. Voles were imported to feed the foxes. A small herd of cattle was brought in to provide meat for the American caretakers, who disliked seal meat. From time to time - 1892, 1912 - the company shipped additional cattle to the island. The cattle were not landed; the crew just drove them overboard and they swam to shore. Once on land, the cattle thrived unattended on the nutritious island grasses. They also lost many traits of domestication. They do not herd up; they charge horses and men; when spooked, they flee into the sea and swim around till it is safe to come out.

== Russian penal colony ==
The late Dr. Lydia Black, a leading scholar of the Russian-American period in Alaska, rebutted the legend that there was once a Russian penal colony on Chirikof. Among those who perpetuated that myth was artist, traveler and writer Henry Wood Elliott, who wrote accurately of the fur trade but fictitiously of much else. Few people at the time were knowledgeable enough to refute Elliott's fantasies. One who could was Capt. Arthur Morris, administrator of Alaska in 1877, who once stated, "Don't believe a word Elliott says except about fur seals."

== Beef industry ==
The beef industry on Chirikof began in earnest in 1925 and continued as late as 1983, when a $875,000 loan from the Alaska Agricultural Loan Board brought 600 new head to the island. The original venture was the brain-child of an Iowa farm boy with a law degree named Jack McCord. McCord formed the Chirikof Cattle Company and labored from 1925 to 1950 to build a successful beef industry on the island. The story is a long saga of shipwrecks, plane crashes, unruly feral cattle, unfulfilled contracts, spoiled meat and good money thrown after bad. A succession of hopeful owners since McCord has been unable to profitably market the beef from this remote island. Ranch workers report that the meat is virtually "inedible," tough and hard to digest.

== National interest lands ==
As part of the 1971 Alaska Native Claims Settlement Act (ANCSA), certain state lands reverted to federal ownership. In 1980, Chirikof Island was added to the Alaska Maritime National Wildlife Refuge. The management plan for the refuge entails restoring the island's native species and requires removal of the cattle, which overgraze the land and damage bird habitat. However, the most recent attempt in 2003 to remove a small part of the herd - 37 head, by barge - resulted in injuries to the animals that attracted the attention of the Humane Society of the United States. Additionally, legal issues have delayed plans to remove the herd and restore the island as a bird sanctuary.

== Additional resources ==
- Ford, Corey, Where the Sea Breaks Its Back
- Davidson, The Tracks and Landfalls of Bering and Chirikof
- Golder, Bering's Voyages
- Waxell, The American Expedition
- Steller, Journal of a Voyage with Bering
- Beaglehole, The Life of Captain James Cook
- Alaska Geographic, Vol 4 No 3, 1977, Kodiak, Island of Change
- Alaska Magazine, August 2000, The Wild Cattle of Chirikof Island
- Rivers, Raymond, Chirikof Adventure, 1949, printed 1961 in Mukluk Telegraph
- Kashevaroff, Chirikof Never a Penal Colony, Jan 28, 1929, Daily Alaska Empire
- McCord/Frye letters, Kodiak Historical Society
- Personal communications from Woodworth, Hamilton, Homme, Stavelund and others
