= Sitkinak Island =

Island in Alaska, United States

Coordinates: 56°32′53″N 154°09′33″W

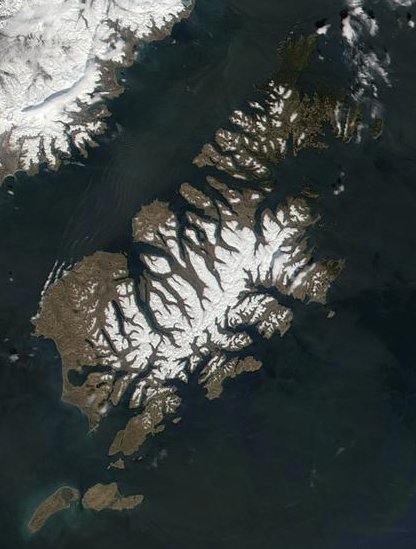
Satellite image of the Kodiak Archipelago including Sitkinak Island

Sitkinak Island is an island of the Kodiak Archipelago of the state of Alaska, United States. It lies south of the southern tip of Kodiak Island in the western part of the Gulf of Alaska. Tugidak Island lies to its west. The two islands are the largest components of the Trinity Islands of Alaska. The Trinity Islands, and thus Sitkinak, are part of the Gulf of Alaska unit of Alaska Maritime National Wildlife Refuge. Sitkinak Island has a land area of 235.506 km^{2} (90.929 sq mi) and no resident population.

From 1960 to 1977 the United States Coast Guard operated a Loran-C station on the island.

Cattle Operation

The Alaska Meat Company runs a free range cattle operation, Sitkinak Ranch on the island. They have about 600 head of cattle which are slaughtered and processed on the island in late fall, having been farmed on the eastern and western islands of Sitkinak since 1937.

Red foxes (Vulpes vulpes) are indigenous to Sitkinak Island.

Geology and paleontology

Marine siltstone beds approximately 210 meters thick belonging to the Narrow Cape Formation crop out on the island. Although terrestrial coal-bearing beds had been known since the 1890s, the marine strata were first discovered in 1962. The formation contains a fossil molluscan fauna of late Oligocene or earliest Miocene age, correlating with the Juanian Stage of the Pacific Northwest.

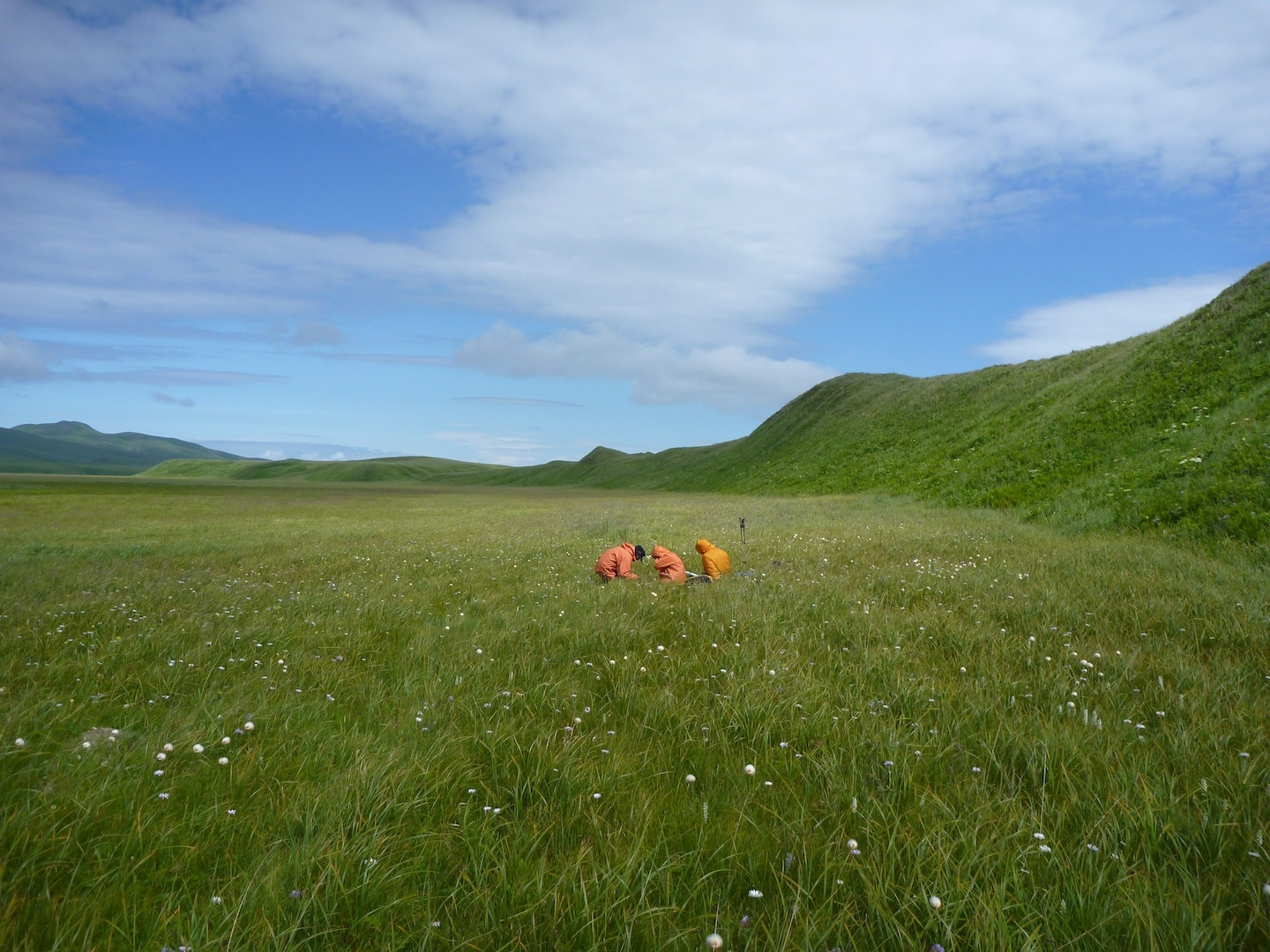
USGS geologists examining geologic cores on the island.

Climate data for Sitkinak Island, Alaska
Month	Jan	Feb	Mar	Apr	May	Jun	Jul	Aug	Sep	Oct	Nov	Dec	Year
Record high °F (°C)	48 (9)	51 (11)	55 (13)	63 (17)	66 (19)	72 (22)	76 (24)	74 (23)	68 (20)	61 (16)	49 (9)	47 (8)	76 (24)
Mean daily maximum °F (°C)	34.1 (1.2)	34.1 (1.2)	35.5 (1.9)	39.7 (4.3)	45.6 (7.6)	51.8 (11.0)	56.4 (13.6)	57.8 (14.3)	53.4 (11.9)	44.8 (7.1)	39.4 (4.1)	35.4 (1.9)	44.0 (6.7)
Daily mean °F (°C)	29.3 (−1.5)	29.2 (−1.6)	31.1 (−0.5)	35.5 (1.9)	41.1 (5.1)	47.3 (8.5)	51.9 (11.1)	53.3 (11.8)	49.5 (9.7)	40.7 (4.8)	35.5 (1.9)	31.6 (−0.2)	39.7 (4.2)
Mean daily minimum °F (°C)	26.4 (−3.1)	26.3 (−3.2)	26.6 (−3.0)	31.2 (−0.4)	36.6 (2.6)	42.8 (6.0)	47.4 (8.6)	48.8 (9.3)	45.5 (7.5)	36.5 (2.5)	31.5 (−0.3)	27.2 (−2.7)	35.6 (2.0)
Record low °F (°C)	−2 (−19)	−1 (−18)	3 (−16)	15 (−9)	24 (−4)	29 (−2)	39 (4)	36 (2)	30 (−1)	18 (−8)	3 (−16)	−5 (−21)	−5 (−21)
Average precipitation inches (mm)	3.35 (85)	2.75 (70)	3.32 (84)	3.08 (78)	3.86 (98)	3.02 (77)	3.23 (82)	5.07 (129)	6.33 (161)	5.49 (139)	5.04 (128)	5.72 (145)	50.26 (1,276)
Average snowfall inches (cm)	5.1 (13)	3.4 (8.6)	1.9 (4.8)	0.7 (1.8)	0.6 (1.5)	0.0 (0.0)	0.0 (0.0)	0.0 (0.0)	0.0 (0.0)	0.7 (1.8)	3.6 (9.1)	11.5 (29)	27.5 (69.6)
Source: WRCC
