= Kodiak Archipelago =

Archipelago south of the state of Alaska, United States

Coordinates: 57°37′N 153°10′W

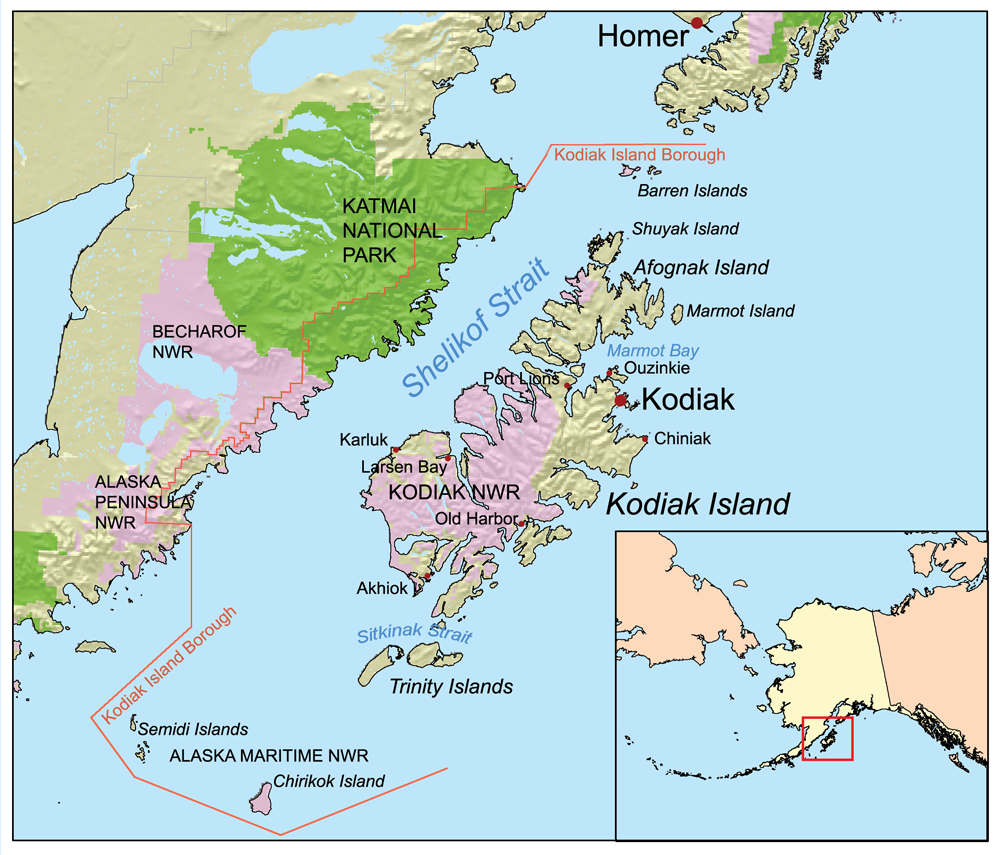

The Kodiak Archipelago (Russian: Кадьякский архипелаг, romanized: Kad'yakskiy arkhipelag) is an archipelago (group of islands) south of the main land-mass of the state of Alaska (United States), about 405 km (252 mi) by air south-west of Anchorage in the Gulf of Alaska. The largest island in the archipelago is Kodiak Island, the second-largest island in the United States. The archipelago has a length of about 285 km (177 mi) and a width of about 108 km (67 mi), from the Barren Islands on the north to Chirikof Island and the Semidi Islands group on the south. The archipelago contains 13,890 km^{2} (5,360 sq mi) of land. The Kodiak Archipelago contains about 40 small glaciers, numerous streams and many species of land and marine animals. Much of its land is forested.

The Kodiak Island Borough includes all of the Kodiak Archipelago and some lands on the mainland. The Kodiak National Wildlife Refuge encompasses a large percentage of the land in the archipelago.

== Islands in the Kodiak Archipelago ==
- Afognak – second largest island
- Aiaktalik Island
- Ban Island
- Barren Islands – most northerly
  - Ushagat Island
  - Nord Island
  - East Amatuli Island
  - West Amatuli Island
- Chirikof Island – most southernly
- Dark Island
- Geese Islands
- Kodiak Island – largest island in the archipelago
- Long Island
- Marmot Island – most easterly
- Near Island
- Raspberry Island
- Semidi Islands – most westerly
  - Aghiyuk Island
  - Anowiki Island
  - Chowiet Island
  - Kateekuk Island
  - Kiliktagik Island
- Shuyak Island
- Sitkalidak Island
- Spruce Island
  - Nelson Island
- Sundstrom Island
- Trinity Islands
  - Tugidak Island
  - Sitkinak Island
- Two-Headed Island
- Uganik Island
- Ugak Island
- Whale Island
- Woody Island

== Holocene archaeology ==
"The archaeological record contains several seemingly abrupt changes suggesting population replacements to some, but the current view, followed here, is that there has been long-term cultural continuity." (Ames et al., p. 61)

The Late Holocene contains four cultural periods: the Early Kachemak, the Late Kachemak, the Koniag, and the Alutiiq. Each period will be broken down by time period, also including the significance of each.

1. Early Kachemak (1850–500 BC) = The period is marked by the shift in mobility patterns: residential foragers to logistical collectors. Dwellings were small in size. Technology and subsistence activities were made more efficient. More efficient ways of processing food were introduced. Material remains include toggling harpoons, netweights, ground slate points, nets, ulus (chopping knife). The Ocean Bay people were the first to inhabit the area. They were considered to be a maritime people, but exploited both marine and terrestrial resources, including mammals and fish. Their only hunting kit included hooks, lines, harpoons, and lances with chipped stone points. By the Middle Holocene, more specialized tool kits were introduced. Originally living in small, dispersed settlements, the small 2-3m tents were replaced by small pit houses around 2000 BC.
2. Late Kachemak (500 BC – AD 1200) = The period is marked by large populations. Logistical patterns of mobility kept increasing, and community sizes increased, having up to ten dwellings. Storage facilities are also introduced. Mortuary practices are considered to be elaborate, and the finding of labrets suggest that social differentiation increased. Craft specialization increased as well.
3. Koniag (AD 1200 – European contact) = The population reached its peak. Houses and settlement sizes continued to increase, suggesting the development of social ranking. Architecture started to become more elaborate and storage features kept increasing in size. Shift in location toward the coast suggests better access to marine resources, specifically to whales. "There is also evidence of intensified salmon fishing, food production and processing specializations, exchange, and investment in carpentry". (Ames et al., p. 62)
4. Alutiiq (Modern) = These islands are the original or traditional homes of the Alutiiqu (previously Koniag) peoples. The coastal environment provided excellent productivity for these people, as the terrestrial environment seemed somewhat low or lacked natural resources.
