= List of shipwrecks in 1994 =

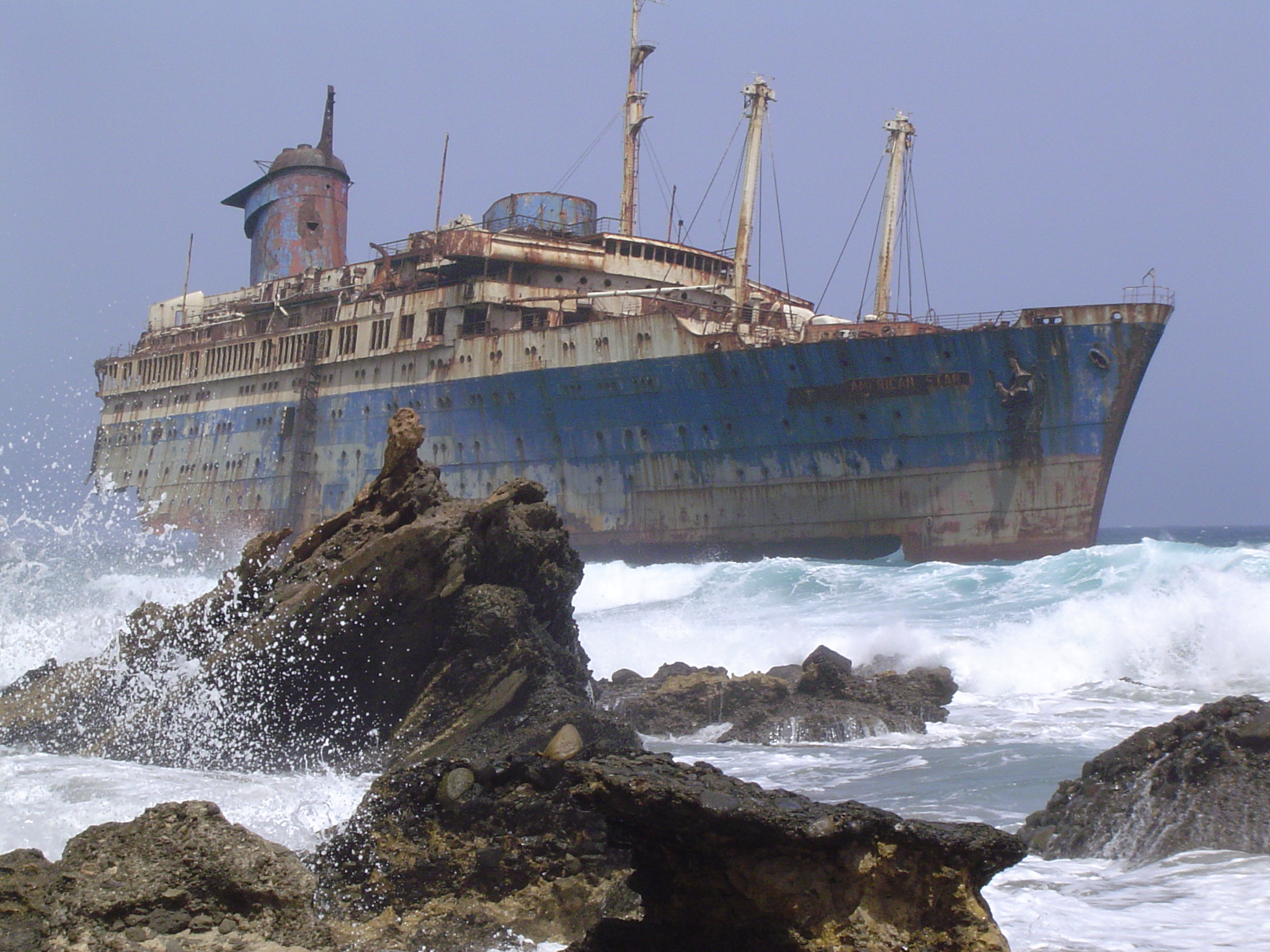
The wreck of American Star in July 2004.

This list of shipwrecks in 1994 includes ships sunk, foundered, grounded, or otherwise lost during 1994.

table of contents
← 1993 / 1994 / 1995 →
Jan	Feb	Mar	Apr
May	Jun	Jul	Aug
Sep	Oct	Nov	Dec
Unknown date

== January ==
=== 2 January ===
List of shipwrecks: 2 January 1994
Ship	State	Description
Arctic Reefer	Cyprus	The cargo ship sank in the Pacific Ocean 310 nautical miles (570 km) south of Shikoku, Japan with the loss of seventeen of her 29 crew.
Marika 7	Liberia	The ore carrier sank in the Atlantic Ocean. There were 36 crew on board.

=== 13 January ===
List of shipwrecks: 13 January 1994
Ship	State	Description
Teano	Norway	The cargo ship was wrecked on the island of Senja, Norway. Wreck delivered for scrapping at Fosen Gjenvinning breaker's yard at Revsnes in Sør-Trøndelag in October 1995.

=== 15 January ===
List of shipwrecks: 15 January 1994
Ship	State	Description
American Star	Greece	The cruise ship ran aground at Fuerteventura, Canary Islands, Spain, after her tow parted in a storm. She broke in two after two days and was declared a total loss in July 1994. The stern section sank in 1996, the bow section in April 2007.

=== 25 January ===
List of shipwrecks: 25 January 1994
Ship	State	Description
HNoMS Oslo	Norway	The Oslo-class frigate ran aground on 24 January off the Marstein Island lighthouse after suffering engine failure. A tow was attempted on 25 January, but as the situation of the ship deteriorated, the tow was let go and the frigate sank.

=== 28 January ===
List of shipwrecks: 28 January 1994
Ship	State	Description
United States lightship Boston	United States Coast Guard	The decommissioned 128-foot (39 m) lightship was scuttled as an artificial reef in 85 feet (26 m) of water in the North Atlantic Ocean east of Ocean City, New Jersey, at 39°15.444′N 074°14.004′W.

== February ==
=== 1 February ===
List of shipwrecks: 1 February 1994
Ship	State	Description
Belair	United States	After her helmsman fell asleep at her wheel, the 91-foot (27.7 m) crab-fishing vessel was wrecked on rocks in a seal rookery on the south coast of St. George Island in the Bering Sea. Her crew of six abandoned ship in a life raft and reached the shore. A United States Coast Guard helicopter from the high endurance cutter USCGC Rush ( United States Coast Guard) hoisted them from the beach and placed them aboard the fish processor Blue Wave (United States), which was moored nearby. The surf pounded Belair to pieces on the rocks, and she was deemed a total loss.

=== 3 February ===
List of shipwrecks: 3 February 1994
Ship	State	Description
Christinaki	Malta	The bulk carrier sank in the Atlantic Ocean 240 nautical miles (440 km) south west of Ireland with the loss of all 27 crew.

=== 6 February ===
List of shipwrecks: 6 February 1994
Ship	State	Description
Lady Selket	United States	The 175-ton, 87-foot (26.5 m) crab-fishing vessel capsized in the Bering Sea approximately 100 nautical miles (190 km; 120 mi) north-northwest of Dutch Harbor, Alaska. Her crew of five abandoned ship in a life raft and was rescued by the fishing vessel Silent Lady (United States). The high endurance cutter USCGC Rush ( United States Coast Guard) sank Lady Selket′s overturned hull with M2 Browning machine gun fire, expending 600 rounds of .50-caliber ammunition.

=== 9 February ===
List of shipwrecks: 9 February 1994
Ship	State	Description
Eagle	United States	The 72-foot (21.9 m) fishing trawler sank in the Gulf of Alaska approximately 17 nautical miles (31 km; 20 mi) southeast of Cape Chiniak (57°37′N 152°10′W) on Alaska′s Kodiak Island. Her entire crew of four survived; a United States Coast Guard helicopter rescued three of them, and the fishing vessel Cap’N Art (United States) picked up the fourth.

=== 13 February ===
List of shipwrecks: 13 February 1994
Ship	State	Description
All Hands	United States	Suffering from icing, the 36-foot (11.0 m) fishing vessel capsized and was lost without loss of life when a wave hit her broadside off Point Retreat (58°24′45″N 134°57′15″W) in Southeast Alaska, 14 nautical miles (26 km; 16 mi) west of Juneau, Alaska. Another fishing vessel rescued her crew of two.

=== 15 February ===
List of shipwrecks: 15 February 1964
Ship	State	Description
Angela Marie	United States	The 49-foot (14.9 m) crab-fishing vessel sank in bad weather in Lisianski Inlet (57°50′N 136°27′W) in Southeast Alaska 7 nautical miles (13 km; 8.1 mi) north of Sitka, Alaska. A United States Coast Guard helicopter rescued her crew of five.
Westerly	United States	The 65-foot (20 m) crab-fishing vessel capsized and sank in 222 feet (68 m) of water in southern Glacier Bay just south of Strawberry Island (57.7389°N 135.1792°W) in Southeast Alaska after her crab pots shifted, causing her to flood by the stern. Another fishing vessel rescued all three people on board.

=== 22 February ===
List of shipwrecks: 22 February 1994
Ship	State	Description
Chevak	United States	The 117.4-foot (35.8 m) crab-fishing vessel ran aground near Reef Point (57°46′N 152°27′W) at the entrance to the harbor at St. Paul on Saint Paul Island in the Pribilof Islands and broke up. A launch from the high endurance cutter USCGC Hamilton ( United States Coast Guard) rescued her crew of seven.
Saint Matthew	United States	The 171-foot (52 m) crab-fishing vessel capsized in the Bering Sea approximately 120 nautical miles (220 km; 140 mi) northwest of Saint Paul Island. One crewman died, but the fishing vessel Gulf Wind (United States) rescued the other seven. Saint Matthew was last seen drifting partially submerged 110 nautical miles (200 km; 130 mi) west of Saint Paul Island.

=== 23 February ===
List of shipwrecks: 23 February 1994
Ship	State	Description
King & Winge	United States	The 143-gross ton, 97.6-foot (29.7 m) crab fishing schooner sank in the Bering Sea approximately 22 nautical miles (41 km; 25 mi) west of Saint Paul Island in the Pribilof Islands. The high endurance cutter USCGC Hamilton ( United States Coast Guard) rescued her crew of four.

=== 24 February ===
List of shipwrecks: 24 February 1994
Ship	State	Description
Boa Force	Norway	The anchor handling tug supply vessel struck a wellhead and sank off Thevenard Island, Western Australia. All eleven crew were rescued. Boa Force was raised on 6 April and subsequently scuttled in deep water.

=== 25 February ===
List of shipwrecks: 25 February 1994
Ship	State	Description
Jody Ann	United States	The 82-foot (25.0 m) crab-fishing vessel sank in the Bering Sea northwest of Saint Paul Island. The fishing vessel Scandies Rose (United States) rescued her crew of five from a life raft.

=== 28 February ===
List of shipwrecks: 25 February 1994
Ship	State	Description
Weisshorn	Cyprus	The cargo ship ran aground near at mouth of Guadalquivir River, Spain, following an anchor chain broke down in a storm and had broken in two. She was on voyage from Bangkok, Thailand to Seville, Spain. She was declared a constructive total loss and used as an artificial tourist wrecksite.

== March ==
=== 4 March ===
List of shipwrecks: 4 March 1994
Ship	State	Description
Jim	United States	The tug was scuttled in deep water near Seward, Alaska, just south of Fourth of July Creek (60°05′45″N 149°22′00″W).
Sally Albatross	Finland	The cruise ship ran aground at Porkkala. All 1,258 people on board were rescued by helicopters and Finnish Coast Guard vessels. She was refloated on 16 April. Later repaired and returned to service.

=== 5 March ===
List of shipwrecks: 5 March 1994
Ship	State	Description
Melisa	Indonesia	The cargo ship capsized and sank at Surabaya. The wreck was scrapped in June 1994.

=== 13 March ===
List of shipwrecks: 13 March 1994
Ship	State	Description
Nassia	Cyprus	The tanker collided with Ship Broker (Cyprus) in the Bosphorus Strait. Both ships caught fire, Nassia was beached with the loss of a crew member.

=== 23 March ===
List of shipwrecks: 23 March 1994
Ship	State	Description
Pallas Athena	Greece	Pallas Athena The cruise ship caught fire and sank at the Port of Piraeus. The wreck was scrapped in 1995.

== April ==
=== 23 April ===
List of shipwrecks: 23 April 1994
Ship	State	Description
Sea Mist	United States	The retired 55-foot (16.8 m) pleasure craft was scuttled as an artificial reef in the North Atlantic Ocean south of Long Island off Shinnecock Inlet, New York.

=== 29 April ===
List of shipwrecks: 29 April 1994
Ship	State	Description
Mtongwe	Kenya	The overloaded ferry capsized in Kilindini Harbour, Kenya, just 40 metres (44 yd) from port during a voyage between Mombasa and Likoni, killing 272 of the 400 people on board.
Provincial Trader	Australia	The prawn trawler, a former tug, capsized and sank at Eden, New South Wales. All crew were rescued by Rubicon (Australia).

== May ==
=== 11 May ===
List of shipwrecks: 11 May 1994
Ship	State	Description
Starcraft	United States	The retired 150-foot (45.7 m) barge was scuttled as an artificial reef in the North Atlantic Ocean 5.1 nautical miles (9.4 km; 5.9 mi) off Spray Beach, New Jersey, at 39°33.528′N 074°06.309′W.

=== 16 May ===
List of shipwrecks: 16 May 1994
Ship	State	Description
Maia D	United States	The 34-foot (10.4 m) salmon troller sank in Stevenson Entrance (58°47′N 152°24′W) on the south-central coast of Alaska. Her crew of two survived and was rescued by the United States Coast Guard.

== June ==
=== 5 June ===
List of shipwrecks: 5 June 1994
Ship	State	Description
Sanjeevani	India	The ship was driven ashore in a hurricane at Mormugao. Scrapped in situ in 1997.

=== 8 June ===
List of shipwrecks: 8 June 1994
Ship	State	Description
Barbara	United States	The 31-foot (9.4 m) halibut longliner sank in the Shelikof Strait approximately 10 nautical miles (19 km; 12 mi) south of Karluk, Alaska, after her engine room flooded through a broken fish bin. The fishing vessel Victoria Ann (United States) rescued her crew of three.
Serenity	United States	While under tow by the fishing vessel Royal Baron (United States), the 36-foot (11 m) halibut longliner capsized and sank in lower Shelikof Strait off the south-central coast of Alaska. Her entire crew of five survived.

=== 10 June ===
List of shipwrecks: 10 June 1994
Ship	State	Description
Blue Crown	United States	The retired 205-foot (62.5 m) cargo ship was scuttled as an artificial reef in 100 feet (30 m) of water in the North Atlantic Ocean east of Ocean City, New Jersey, at 39°14.138′N 074°12.357′W.

=== 11 June ===
List of shipwrecks: 11 June 1994
Ship	State	Description
Black and Blue	United States	The 26-foot (7.9 m) longline fishing vessel was wrecked at Trinity Point (60°48′25″N 148°33′20″W) on the south-central coast of Alaska northeast of Whittier. Her crew of three survived.

=== 21 June ===
List of shipwrecks: 21 June 1994
Ship	State	Description
Advance II	Unknown	The research vessel – a former PCE-842-class patrol craft – was scuttled off Kitty Hawk, North Carolina, to create an artificial reef.

=== 22 June ===
List of shipwrecks: 22 June 1994
Ship	State	Description
Destiny	United States	The 32-foot (9.8 m) gillnet fishing vessel burned and sank at Port Moller (55°59′30″N 160°34′30″W), Alaska. Another fishing vessel rescued her crew of four.
Pankof	United States	The 100-foot (30.5 m) fish tender broke up and sank at Egegik, Alaska, after striking a rock. A fishing vessel rescued her entire crew of five.

=== 26 June ===
List of shipwrecks: 26 June 1994
Ship	State	Description
Apollo Sea	Panama	The Chinese-owned, Panamanian-registered bulk carrier sank near Cape Town, South Africa, with the loss of all 36 of her crew.
BOS 400	France	The wreck of BOS 400 on 5 February 2006. The construction barge ran aground off Duiker Point near Sandy Bay, Cape Town, South Africa, while under tow by the tugboat Tigr (Russia).
Explorer	United States	The 62-foot (19 m) fishing trawler sank in 90 feet (27 m) of water without loss of life 2 nautical miles (3.7 km; 2.3 mi) south of Sheep Point, Newport, Rhode Island, at 41°25.87′N 071°17.99′W after striking a floating object that pierced her hull.

== July ==
=== 6 July ===
List of shipwrecks: 6 July 1994
Ship	State	Description
Captain Etzel	United States	The retired 110-foot (33.5 m) barge was scuttled as an artificial reef in the North Atlantic Ocean 3.6 nautical miles (6.7 km; 4.1 mi) off Sea Girt, New Jersey, at 40°07.910′N 073°56.168′W.

=== 13 July ===
List of shipwrecks: 13 July 1994
Ship	State	Description
13 de Marzo	Cuba	Carrying approximately 70 people attempting to leave Cuba illegally, the tugboat sank 7 nautical miles (13 km; 8.1 mi) northeast of Havana, Cuba, after reportedly being rammed repeatedly by patrol boats of the Cuban Coast Guard. Only 31 people aboard her survived.

=== 23 July ===
List of shipwrecks: 24 July 1994
Ship	State	Description
HDMS Vejrø	Royal Danish Navy	The cutter was severely damaged in a collision with a container ship off Fehmarn.

=== 24 July ===
List of shipwrecks: 24 July 1994
Ship	State	Description
Lady Bea	United States	The 32-foot (9.8 m) salmon seiner was destroyed by fire at Naknek, Alaska. One crew member perished.
Perseverance	United States	The 36-foot (11.0 m) fishing vessel was beached and destroyed by fire at False Pass, Alaska. Her crew of three survived

== August ==
=== 1 August ===
List of shipwrecks: 1 August 1994
Ship	State	Description
Knight Island	United States	The 152-foot (46.3 m) salmon tender capsized and sank in 90 to 120 feet (27 to 37 meters) of water in the Shelikof Strait approximately 1 nautical mile (1.9 km; 1.2 mi) off Cape Ugat on the coast of Kodiak Island in Alaska′s Kodiak Archipelago. The buoy tender USCGC Sedge ( United States Coast Guard) rescued her crew of three.

=== 2 August ===
List of shipwrecks: 2 August 1994
Ship	State	Description
Judy M	United States	The 33-foot (10.1 m) fishing vessel was destroyed by fire near Ouzinkie, Alaska. Her crew of two survived.

=== 3 August ===
List of shipwrecks: 3 August 1994
Ship	State	Description
Teach	United States	The 30-foot (9.1 m) salmon troller was destroyed by fire at False Pass, Alaska. Her two-man crew escaped in a skiff.

=== 4 August ===
List of shipwrecks: 4 August 1994
Ship	State	Description
Dylan’s Dream	United States	The five-member crew of the 50-foot (15.2 m) salmon seiner abandoned her after she caught fire in Izhut Bay (58°11′N 152°15′W) on the coast of Afognak Island in Alaska′s Kodiak Archipelago. The fishing vessel Cape Lookout (United States) rescued the crew from a skiff and took Dylan’s Dream under tow, but Dylan’s Dream burned to the waterline and became a total loss.

=== 8 August ===
List of shipwrecks: 8 August 1994
Ship	State	Description
HMAS Adroit	Royal Australian Navy	The decommissioned Attack-class patrol boat was sunk as a target by Royal New Zealand Air Force A-4 Skyhawks west of Rottnest Island, Western Australia.
Kari	United States	The 28-foot (8.5 m) salmon seiner sank near Sand Point, Alaska. Another fishing vessel rescued her crew of two.

=== 11 August ===
List of shipwrecks: 11 August 1994
Ship	State	Description
Castle Cape	United States	The 135-foot (10.7 m) salmon seiner sank after colliding in fog with the fishing vessel Capelin (United States) off Elrington Island (60°00′N 148°03′W) on the south-central coast of Alaska. The United States Coast Guard rescued her crew of four.

=== 21 August ===
List of shipwrecks: 21 August 1994
Ship	State	Description
Sonar	United States	The 46-foot (14 m) salmon seiner ran aground and sank at Entrance Island (55°06′35″N 133°14′30″W) near Sea Otter Harbor (55°06′45″N 133°12′55″W) in Southeast Alaska. Another fishing vessel rescued her entire crew of five.

=== Unknown date ===
List of shipwrecks: Unknown date August 1994
Ship	State	Description
Brown Bear	United States	The motor vessel sank at San Diego, California, due to neglect. She broke in half in 1995, and was refloated, towed out to sea, and scuttled in the Pacific Ocean in late 1997 or January 1998.

== September ==
=== 3 September ===
List of shipwrecks: 3 September 1994
Ship	State	Description
Iron Antonis	Greece	The ore carrier sank in the Atlantic Ocean 1,700 nautical miles (3,100 km) west of Cape Town, South Africa with the loss of all 24 crew.

=== 9 September ===
List of shipwrecks: 9 September 1994
Ship	State	Description
Mystic Lady	United States	While no one was on board, the 40-foot (12.2 m) fishing vessel burned to the waterline in Kitoi Bay (58°11′30″N 152°21′00″W) on the coast of Kodiak Island near Kodiak, Alaska, after a fire began in her stove.
Pacific Mist	United States	The 54-foot (16.5 m) fishing vessel was wrecked at Granite Cove (58°11′30″N 136°23′30″W) on George Island in Cross Sound in the Alexander Archipelago in Southeast Alaska. Her crew of two survived.

=== 14 September ===
List of shipwrecks: 14 September 1994
Ship	State	Description
Anna Da	United States	The 27-foot (8.2 m) salmon gillnetter sank in bad weather in Nichols Passage (55°05′N 131°42′W) in Southeast Alaska. Another fishing vessel rescued her crew of two.
Rachel K	United States	The 63-foot (19.2 m) longline fishing vessel sank in bad weather in the Gulf of Alaska southeast of Kayak Island off the south-central coast of Alaska. A United States Coast Guard helicopter rescued her entire crew of six.
Spirit	United States	The 54-foot (16.5 m) longline halibut-fishing vessel sank near Perl Island off the south-central coast of Alaska during a storm. The cutter USCGC Roanoke Island ( United States Coast Guard) rescued all five members of her crew.
Ural	United States	The 41-foot (12.5 m) fishing vessel capsized and sank in Kennedy Entrance at the south end of Cook Inlet in Alaska. Another fishing vessel picked up two members of her crew and a United States Coast Guard rescue swimmer rescued a third crew member.
Wesley	United States	The 42-foot (12.8 m) longline halibut fishing vessel flooded, capsized, and sank in Frederick Sound in the Alexander Archipelago 30 nautical miles (56 km; 35 mi) northwest of Petersburg, Alaska. Wesley′s captain put on her survival suit but drowned when she was trapped in the wheelhouse as Wesley capsized and sank. A nearby fishing vessel rescued the only other person on board.

=== 16 September ===
List of shipwrecks: 16 September 1994
Ship	State	Description
Golden Eye	United States	The 34-foot (10.4 m) longline fishing vessel sank near Juneau, Alaska. The United States Coast Guard rescued her crew of two.

=== 18 September ===
List of shipwrecks: 18 September 1994
Ship	State	Description
Roughneck	United States	The 46-foot (14.0 m) crab-fishing vessel sank in the Gulf of Alaska south of the Trinity Islands (56°33′N 154°20′W). A United States Coast Guard helicopter rescued her two crew members from a life raft.

=== 19 September ===
List of shipwrecks: 19 September 1994
Ship	State	Description
Marcilio Dias	Brazilian Navy	The Gearing-class destroyer was sunk as a target during a torpedo exercise.

=== 20 September ===
List of shipwrecks: 20 September 1994
Ship	State	Description
SLNS Sagarawardena	Sri Lanka Navy	Sri Lankan Civil War: The Jayasagara-class patrol craft was sunk off Mannar, Sri Lanka, by two Liberation Tigers of Tamil Eelam suicide boats. 25 crewmen killed, 18 prisoners of war.

=== 23 September ===
List of shipwrecks: 23 September 1994
Ship	State	Description
Algolake	Canada	Algolake ran aground in the St. Lawrence River off Quebec.

=== 28 September ===
List of shipwrecks: 28 September 1994
Ship	State	Description
Estonia	Estonia	The ferry sank in the Baltic Sea (59°23′N 21°42′E) due to the loss of her bow doors in a storm. There were 989 people on the ferry of which 852 were lost.

=== 29 September ===
List of shipwrecks: 29 September 1994
Ship	State	Description
Wagners Point	United States	The retired 97-foot (29.6 m) tug was scuttled as an artificial reef in the North Atlantic Ocean 6.5 nautical miles (12.0 km; 7.5 mi) off Harvey Cedars, New Jersey, in 80 feet (24 m) of water at 39°37.697′N 074°01.113′W.

=== 30 September ===
List of shipwrecks: 30 September 1994
Ship	State	Description
Ocean Spray	United States	The 81-foot (24.7 m) fishing trawler sank in the Bering Sea off Unimak Island in the Aleutian Islands. A United States Coast Guard helicopter rescued her crew of four from a life raft.

== October ==
=== 8 October ===
List of shipwrecks: 8 October 1994
Ship	State	Description
Condor II	Australia	The catamaran ferry ran aground in the Derwent River at Hobart, Tasmania during trials. Damage was put at A$4,000,000 (then £2,700,000).

=== 12 October ===
List of shipwrecks: 8 October 1994
Ship	State	Description
JRM TČ-219 Streljko	Federal Yugoslav Navy	Croatian War of Independence: The torpedo boat, captured by the Croatian Navy in 1991, was sunk as a target by the missile boat RTOP-11 Kralj Petar Krešimir IV (Croatian Navy) with RBS-15B missiles.

=== 25 October ===
List of shipwrecks: 25 October 1994
Ship	State	Description
Holgate I	United States	The retired 65-foot (19.8 m) fishing trawler and clam dredger was scuttled as an artificial reef in the North Atlantic Ocean 5.1 nautical miles (9.4 km; 5.9 mi) off Spray Beach, New Jersey, in 60 feet (18 m) of water at 39°33.404′N 074°06.452′W.

=== 26 October ===
List of shipwrecks: 26 October 1994
Ship	State	Description
Fierce Competitor	United States	The 105-foot (32.0 m) crab-fishing vessel disappeared with the loss of her entire crew of five – four men and a woman – in the Gulf of Alaska. A life raft from Fierce Competitor was sighted 450 nautical miles (830 km; 520 mi) southeast of Kodiak, Alaska, and about 50 nautical miles (93 km; 58 mi) from where Fierce Competitor′s EPIRB had transmitted a distress signal, but there was no sign of life aboard the raft.

== November ==
=== 11 November ===
List of shipwrecks: 11 November 1994
Ship	State	Description
Trade Daring	Liberia	The ore-bulk-oil carrier broke in two during loading at Ponta da Madeira, Brazil. The wreck was later removed and scuttled offshore.

=== 12 November ===
List of shipwrecks: 12 November 1994
Ship	State	Description
SAS Pietermaritzburg	South African Navy	The wreck of SAS Pietermaritzburg in June 2011. The officers′ training ship was scuttled to create an artificial reef at Miller's Point near Simon’s Town, South Africa.

=== 14 November ===
List of shipwrecks: 14 November 1994
Ship	State	Description
Jeano Express	United States	The 175-foot (53 m) coastal freighter became stranded while steaming in ballast 20 miles (32 km) southeast of Long Key, Florida. The entire crew was rescued by US Navy and US Coast Guard (USCG) helicopters. The powerless vessel was eventually shelled and sunk by a USCG cutter while drifting towards the Florida Keys reefs, where the ship would have posed a threat to the environment.

=== 18 November ===
List of shipwrecks: 18 November 1994
Ship	State	Description
Apache	United States	The 85-foot (25.9 m) crab-fishing schooner struck an iceberg and sank 1.5 nautical miles (2.8 km; 1.7 mi) off Bay Point (57°06′30″N 133°19′00″W) in Farragut Bay (57.1103°N 133.2412°W) in Southeast Alaska 25 nautical miles (46 km; 29 mi) north of Petersburg, Alaska. All four people on board survived.

=== 30 November ===
List of shipwrecks: 30 November 1994
Ship	State	Description
Achille Lauro	Italy	The cruise ship caught fire in the Indian Ocean off Somalia. She was abandoned and subsequently sank on 2 December.

== December ==
=== 2 December ===
List of shipwrecks: 2 December 1994
Ship	State	Description
Cebu City	Philippines	The ferry sank in Manila Bay with the loss of 140 lives after colliding with the cargo ship Kota Suria (Singapore).

=== 9 December ===
List of shipwrecks: 9 December 1994
Ship	State	Description
Conquest	United States	The 75-gross ton, 58-foot (17.7 m) fishing vessel burned and sank near the boat harbor at Sand Point, Alaska.
Salvador Allende	Ukraine	The cargo ship sank during a storm in the North Atlantic Ocean with the loss of 29 of her 31 crew.

=== 21 December ===
List of shipwrecks: 21 December 1994
Ship	State	Description
HMAS Derwent	Royal Australian Navy	The decommissioned River-class destroyer escort was scuttled in the Indian Ocean in the Rottnest ship graveyard 12 nautical miles (22 km; 14 mi) west of Rottnest Island, Western Australia, after use as a target.

=== 24 December ===
List of shipwrecks: 24 December 1994
Ship	State	Description
Murmansk	Russian Navy	The wreck of Murmansk on 6 January 2002. The decommissioned Sverdlov-class light cruiser ran aground and was wrecked off Sørvær, Finnmark, Norway, while under tow to be scrapped in India. Her wreck later was scrapped in situ.

== Unknown date ==
List of shipwrecks: Unknown date 1993
Ship	State	Description
Boston Corsair	Spain	The 89.3-foot (27.2 m), 361-ton trawler sank at La Corunna sometime in 1994.
Mr. J	United States	The crab processor – a former PCE-842-class patrol craft and auxiliary minelayer – was towed out into the Pacific Ocean and scuttled sometime in the 1990s.
John H Amos	United Kingdom	John H Amos The paddle tug sank at Chatham, Kent
SLNS P-202, SLNS P-203	Sri Lanka Navy	Sri Lankan Civil War: The patrol boats were sunk by the Liberation Tigers of Tamil Eelam on the same day sometime in 1994.
