= List of shipwrecks in 1997 =

The list of shipwrecks in 1997 includes ships sunk, foundered, grounded, or otherwise lost during 1997.

table of contents
1997
Jan	Feb	Mar	Apr
May	Jun	Jul	Aug
Sep	Oct	Nov	Dec
Unknown date

== January ==
=== 1 January ===
List of shipwrecks: 1 January 1997
Ship	State	Description
Debra D	United States	With no one aboard, the 182-gross ton, 101.6-foot (31.0 m) fishing vessel caught fire while moored at Dutch Harbor, Alaska. The fire destroyed her bridge and accommodation spaces, and she was declared a constructive total loss. She later was completely rebuilt and placed back in service.
Jutha Jessica	Thailand	The cargo ship ran aground off Saengo, South Korea. She subsequently broke in tow and sank with the loss of two of her 29 crew. Three people were reported missing.

=== 2 January ===
List of shipwrecks: 2 January 1997
Ship	State	Description
Nakhodla	Russia	The tanker broke in two 57 nautical miles (106 km) north east of the Oki Islands, Japan. (37°08′N 133°55′E). The bow section came ashore, the stern section sank.

=== 4 January ===
List of shipwrecks: 4 January 1997
Ship	State	Description
Mehmet Kirbas	Turkey	The cargo ship collided with Nergis Erdem (Turkey) and sank in the Black Sea off Akcakoca. Her ten crew were rescued.

=== 7 January ===
List of shipwrecks: 7 January 1997
Ship	State	Description
Prvic	Malta	The cargo ship suffered an engine failure in the Mediterranean Sea (36°47′N 2°51′E). She came ashore on 9 January. Subsequently scrapped in situ.

=== 8 January ===
List of shipwrecks: 8 January 1997
Ship	State	Description
Onur K.	Turkey	The cargo ship foundered in the Mediterranean Sea 85 nautical miles (157 km) off Cagliari, Sardinia, Italy (38°49′N 11°00′E) with the loss of four of her eleven crew. One person was reported missing.
Sun Richie 3	Saint Vincent and the Grenadines	The cargo ship sprang a leakd and foundered in the East China Sea (28°24′N 123°58′E). Her crew were rescued.

=== 10 January ===
List of shipwrecks: 10 January 1997
Ship	State	Description
Lawas Mewah	Malaysia	The cargo ship foundered in the South China Sea (1°47′N 108°17′E). Her sixteen crew were rescued.
Ru Yi 2	China	The cargo ship collided with Dong Ji (Flag unknown) and sank in the Yangtze at Yangzhong with the loss of two of her 21 crew. Ten people were reported missing. She was cut it two, with the stern section being refloated and scrapped.

=== 12 January ===
List of shipwrecks: 12 January 1997
Ship	State	Description
Geir Codi	Finland	The fishing vessel foundered in the Baltic Sea south of Utö. Her three crew were rescued.

=== 13 January ===
List of shipwrecks: 13 January 1997
Ship	State	Description
Choun Maru No.18	Japan	The fishing vessel collided with Welsun (Flag unknown) and sank in the Korea Strait 18 nautical miles (33 km) south east of Cheju Island, South Korea. Her ten crew were reported missing.

=== 16 January ===
List of shipwrecks: 16 January 1997
Ship	State	Description
Moussaillon	France	The fishing vessel caught fire in the North Sea (61°14′N 2°12′E). Her eighteen crew were rescued. She was towed in to Bergen, Norway on 18 January. Declared a constructive total loss and scrapped.
Pacific Alliance	United States	The fishing vessel foundered in the Pacific Ocean 60 nautical miles (110 km)) off Cape Scott, Vancouver Island, Canada (50°12′N 130°39′W) with the loss of one of her four crew. The other three were reported missing.
Trinity	United States	The fishing vessel foundered in the Atlantic Ocean (40°02′N 71°52′W). Her cew were rescued.

=== 17 January ===
List of shipwrecks: 17 January 1997
Ship	State	Description
Chestnut Hill	United States	The tanker suffered a machinery failure in the Pacific Ocean 750 nautical miles (1,390 km) off the coast of Oregon (44°46′N 143°13′W). She was towed to Honolulu, Hawaii. Declared a constructive total loss, she arrived at Chittagong, Bangladesh on 25 April for scrapping.
Commodore	United States	The fishing vessel was presumed to have foundered in the Atlantic Ocean off Nantucket, Massachusetts.

=== 18 January ===
List of shipwrecks: 18 January 1997
Ship	State	Description
Laura	flag unknown	The fishing vessel foundered. She was being towed from Guam to a port in Ecuador.
Pacific Alliance	United States	The crab-fishing vessel sank in bad weather with the loss of four lives off Vancouver Island, British Columbia, Canada.

=== 21 January ===
List of shipwrecks: 21 January 1997
Ship	State	Description
Sandra W	United States	The 49-foot (14.9 m) fishing vessel capsized and sank in the Gulf of Alaska approximately 10 nautical miles (19 km; 12 mi) east of Sitkalidak Island in the Kodiak Archipelago. The fishing vessel Green Hope (United States) rescued her entire crew of three from a life raft.

=== 25 January ===
List of shipwrecks: 25 January 1997
Ship	State	Description
USS Tolman	United States Navy	The decommissioned fast minelayer, formerly a Robert H. Smith-class destroyer, was sunk as a target.

=== 28 January ===
List of shipwrecks: 28 January 1997
Ship	State	Description
Meratus Mas	Indonesia	The cargo ship foundered in the Java Sea off Bawean (5°44′S 103°09′E). Her 23 crew were rescued.

=== 30 January ===
List of shipwrecks: 30 January 1997
Ship	State	Description
Ahmet Akdeniz	Turkey	The cargo ship foundered in the Black Sea off Rize with the loss of one of her nine crew. Two people were reported missing.
Oldersund	Norway	The fishing vessel ran aground north of Rorvik. Her eleven crew were rescued. She was scrapped in situ.
Rosie G	United States	The 80-foot (24.4 m) crab-fishing vessel sank due to a leaking crab tank in the Bering Sea approximately 14 nautical miles (26 km) northwest of Unalaska, Alaska (54°11′N 166°56′W). The fishing vessel Handler (United States) rescued her entire crew of six from a life raft.

=== 31 January ===
List of shipwrecks: 31 January 1997
Ship	State	Description
Toshin	Belize	The cargo ship was holed by ice and sank in the Yellow Sea (40°08′N 121°45′E). Her nine crew were rescued.

=== Unknown date ===
List of shipwrecks: Unknown date in January 1997
Ship	State	Description
Nekane	Spain	The fishing vessel ran aground and was wrecked.

== February ==
=== 1 February ===
List of shipwrecks: 1 February 1997
Ship	State	Description
Mardepesca	Argentina	The fishing vessel foundered.

=== 2 February ===
List of shipwrecks: 2 February 1997
Ship	State	Description
Estrella No.3	Argentina	The fishing vessel caught fire off the coast of Argentina. She sank on 4 February.
Long Tong	China	The cargo ship collided with Min Da (Flag unknown) and sank in the South China Sea (24°08′N 118°06′E).

=== 8 February ===
List of shipwrecks: 8 February 1997
Ship	State	Description
Leros Strength	Cyprus	The bulk carrier foundered in the North Sea 30 nautical miles (56 km) west of Stavanger, Norway (58°54′N 4°38′E). Her twenty crew were reported missing.

=== 12 February ===
List of shipwrecks: 12 February 1997
Ship	State	Description
Jessie C	United States	The retired 65-foot (19.8 m) crew boat was scuttled as an artificial reef in the North Atlantic Ocean four nautical miles (7.4 km; 4.6 mi) off Holgate, New Jersey, at 39°28.501′N 074°11.631′W.

=== 13 February ===
List of shipwrecks: 13 February 1997
Ship	State	Description
Tokio Express	Germany	The container ship, on a voyage from Rotterdam bound for New York, was hit by a rogue wave about 20 miles (32 km) off Land's End, Cornwall. The ship righted herself and survived but lost 62 shipping containers overboard, one releasing just under 5 million Lego pieces.
Tpao	Turkey	The tanker was damaged by an explosion and fire at Tuzla, Bosnia and Herzegovina. The fire was extinguished on 21 February. Declared a constructive total loss, she arrived at Aliağa on 29 August for scrapping.

=== 14 February ===
List of shipwrecks: 14 February 1997
Ship	State	Description
Mika II	Cyprus	The cargo ship ran aground off Veracruz, Mexico. She was refloated on 8 March. Declared a constructive total loss, she departed on 25 April for Tuxpan, Mexico for scrapping.

=== 16 February ===
List of shipwrecks: 16 February 1997
Ship	State	Description
African Star	Panama	The refrigerated cargo ship caught fire in the Atlantic Ocean (7°40′N 13°41′W). She sank on 19 February. Her crew were rescued.

=== 18 February ===
List of shipwrecks: 18 February 1997
Ship	State	Description
Albion Two	Cyprus	The bulk carrier foundered 40 nautical miles (74 km) west south west of Ouessant, Finistère, France (48°18′N 6°08′W). Her 25 crew were reported missing.
Magic Minnow	United States	The 32-foot (9.8 m) crab-fishing vessel was destroyed by an engine room explosion and fire in Gastineau Channel in the Alexander Archipelago in Southeast Alaska.
Rajah Mas	Malaysia	The passenger ship ran aground off Sarawak (2°10′N 111°09′E). She capsized and sank with the loss of two of the 22 people on board.

=== 19 February ===
List of shipwrecks: 19 February 1997
Ship	State	Description
Lisa Jo	United States	The 82-foot (25.0 m) fishing vessel ran aground, capsized, and sank without loss of life in Akun Bay (54°15′N 165°30′W) on the coast of Akun Island in the Aleutian Islands after her operator – who was the only person on board – fell asleep at her wheel.

=== 21 February ===
List of shipwrecks: 21 February 1997
Ship	State	Description
Avatapu	Cook Islands	The fishing vessel caught fire in the Pacific Ocean (17°22′S 162°59′W) and was presumed to have foundered. All on board were rescued.

=== 23 February ===
List of shipwrecks: 23 February 1997
Ship	State	Description
Kinei Maru No.18	Japan	The cargo ship foundered off Hirado. Declared a constructive total loss, she was subsequently refloated and scrapped.

=== 24 February ===
List of shipwrecks: 24 February 1997
Ship	State	Description
Rig	Italy	The tug caught fire in the Indian Ocean. She was taken in tow, but capsized and sank (12°36′N 44°43′E).

=== 25 February ===
List of shipwrecks: 25 February 1997
Ship	State	Description
Rena	Colombia	The cargo ship foundered. She was on a voyage from Puerto Limón, Costa Rica to San Andrés. A crew member was reported missing.

=== 27 February ===
List of shipwrecks: 27 February 1997
Ship	State	Description
USS Picking	United States Navy	The decommissioned Fletcher-class destroyer was sunk as a target .

=== 28 February ===
List of shipwrecks: 28 February 1997
Ship	State	Description
Jennie D	United States	The 35-foot (10.7 m) herring-fishing vessel ran aground and sank at Cape Paramanof (58°18′20″N 153°03′30″W) on the coast of Afognak Island in Alaska's Kodiak Archipelago after her engine failed. Her crew of two abandoned ship in a skiff and were rescued by the cutter USCGC Roanoke Island ( United States Coast Guard).
Kangson	Cambodia	The cargo ship collided with the bulk carrierMei Gui Hai (China) and sank at the mouth of the Yangtze (31°03′N 122°31′E). Three of her 41 crew were reported missing.

== March ==
=== 1 March ===
List of shipwrecks: 1 March 1997
Ship	State	Description
Novic	United States	The 37-foot (11.3 m) longline cod-fishing vessel sank at English Bay, Alaska. Her crew of two survived.

=== 5 March ===
List of shipwrecks: 5 March 1997
Ship	State	Description
Vikartindur	Germany	The container ship was beached on the south coast of Iceland 100 nautical miles (190 km) south east of Reykjavík (63°43′N 20°52′W). Declared a constructive total loss, she was scrapped in situ..

=== 8 March ===
List of shipwrecks: 8 March 1997
Ship	State	Description
Sea Boekanier	Belize	The cargo ship foundered 18 nautical miles (33 km) off Nuevitas, Cuba. Her crew were rescued.

=== 9 March ===
List of shipwrecks: 9 March 1997
Ship	State	Description
Disarfell	Antigua and Barbuda	The cargo ship capsized and sank 100 nautical miles (190 km) south east of Hornafjörður, Iceland (62°47′N 13°29′W) with the loss of two of her twelve crew.
Pera	Papua New Guinea	Cyclone Justin: The ro-ro ship foundered south east of Cape St. George. Two of her eight crew were reported missing.

=== 10 March ===
List of shipwrecks: 10 March 1997
Ship	State	Description
Joanna V	Cyprus	The bulk carrier suffered a damaged propeller in the Black Sea 60 nautical miles (110 km) south of Odessa, Ukraine. She was towed in to Eleusis, Greece. Declared a constructive total loss, she departed on 23 June for a Turkish port for scrapping.
Thorsteinn	Iceland	The fishing vessel was driven ashore at Krisuvikurbjarg (63°49′N 22°12′W). Her ten crew were rescued.

=== 16 March ===
List of shipwrecks: 16 March 1997
Ship	State	Description
Altagrace Marine	Honduras	The cargo ship foundered off Tolú, Colombia.

=== 21 March ===
List of shipwrecks: 21 March 1997
Ship	State	Description
Shahib	Maldives	The cargo ship foundered in the Indian Ocean (20°45′N 69°59′E). Her crew were rescued.

=== 23 March ===
List of shipwrecks: 23 March 1997
Ship	State	Description
Coral	United States	The 43-foot (13.1 m) longline fishing vessel ran aground and sank in Resurrection Bay on the south-central coast of Alaska. Her crew of two survived.

=== 25 March ===
List of shipwrecks: 25 March 1997
Ship	State	Description
Myo Hyang San	North Korea	The cargo ship sprang a leak and sank in the Tsushima Strait off Iki Island, Japan (33°42′N 129°43′E). Her 22 crew were rescued.

=== 26 March ===
List of shipwrecks: 26 March 1997
Ship	State	Description
Cita	Antigua and Barbuda	Cita The cargo ship ran aground at Newfoundland Point, St Mary's, Isles of Scilly. She subsequently sank. All seven crew were rescued.
SNP-1	Peru	The fishing vessel caught fire and sank at Salaverry.
Superferry 7	Philippines	The ro-ro ship was destroyed by fire at Manila.

=== 28 March ===
List of shipwrecks: 28 March 1997
Ship	State	Description
Kateri i Radës	Albania	Tragedy of Otranto: The motorboat was hit by Sibilia (Italian Navy) in the Strait of Otranto. She capsized and sank with the loss of 83 lives

=== 30 March ===
List of shipwrecks: 30 March 1997
Ship	State	Description
Eight LTTE boats	Liberation Tigers of Tamil Eelam	Sri Lankan Civil War: Action off Mullaitivu: One Liberation Tigers of Tamil Eelam (LTTE) explosive motorboat was shelled and blown up by SLNS Parakramabahu (Sri Lanka Navy). Seven other LTTE explosive motorboats and/or assault boats were sunk by other Sri Lanka Navy warships 20 miles (32 km) east of Mullaitivu.

=== 31 March ===
List of shipwrecks: 31 March 1997
Ship	State	Description
Perwira	Indonesia	The tanker capsized and sank at Tanjung Priok (6°04′S 106°52′E). She was later refloated and scrapped.

== April ==
=== 3 April ===
List of shipwrecks: 14 April 1997
Ship	State	Description
O Sung No.3	South Korea	The tanker ran aground and sank off Koje Island. Her crew were rescued.

=== 4 April ===
List of shipwrecks: 4 April 1997
Ship	State	Description
Kekova	Turkey	The bulk carrier collided with the tanker Vasilios VII (Greece) in the Sea of Marmara. Declared a constructive total loss, she arrived at Aliağa on 2 June for scrapping.

=== 13 April ===
List of shipwrecks: 14 April 1997
Ship	State	Description
Boreas	Malta	The bulk carrier suffered an engine failure. She was towed in to Bermuda on 28 April. Declared a constructive total loss, she arrived at Aliağa, Turkey on 22 December for scrapping.

=== 14 April ===
List of shipwrecks: 14 April 1997
Ship	State	Description
Pampero	Saint Vincent and the Grenadines	The tanker caught fire, exploded and sank 10 nautical miles (19 km) east of Havana, Cuba with the loss of one of her 24 crew. Five people were reported missing.

=== 16 April ===
List of shipwrecks: 16 April 1997
Ship	State	Description
Sea Mint	United States	The 54-foot (16 m) salmon seiner sank in the Gulf of Alaska off Sitkalidak Island in the Kodiak Archipelago. No one was aboard her at the time.

=== 18 April ===
List of shipwrecks: 18 April 1997
Ship	State	Description
Hakusa Maru	Japan	The dredger foundered off Niigata.

=== 19 April ===
List of shipwrecks: 19 April 1997
Ship	State	Description
Gulf's Stream	Belize	The tanker foundered 23 nautical miles (43 km) north of La Tortuga Island, Venezuela (11°17′N 65°14′W. One of her 26 crew was reported missing.
Natalie	Saint Vincent and the Grenadines	The cargo ship was damaged by weather at Mumbai, India. Declared a constructive total loss, she arrived at Alang, India on 15 June for scrapping.

=== 20 April ===
List of shipwrecks: 20 April 1997
Ship	State	Description
Tahir Kiran	Turkey	The bulk carrier caught fire in the Gulf of Suez (27°36′N 33°58′E). She was towed into Suez, Egypt. Declared a constructive total loss, she arrived at Gadani Beach, Pakistan on 29 September for scrapping.

=== 27 April ===
List of shipwrecks: 27 April 1997
Ship	State	Description
Cheuk Yang	South Korea	The LPG tanker capsized off "Chindo" (34°19′N 126°07′E). She was reported to have founder on 4 May with the loss of one of her eleven crew. Nine people were reported missing.

=== 30 April ===
List of shipwrecks: 30 April 1997
Ship	State	Description
La Fidèle	French Navy	The La Prudente-class netlayer exploded and sank in the English Channel off Cherbourg, Seine-Maritime, France, with the loss of five of her sixteen crew.

== May ==
=== 1 May ===
List of shipwrecks: 1 May 1997
Ship	State	Description
Mensajera	Honduras	The fishing vessel foundered.

=== 3 May ===
List of shipwrecks: 3 May 1997
Ship	State	Description
Salvia	South Africa	The fishing vessel caught fire in the Atlantic Ocean (19°55′S 11°48′E). Although the fire was extinguished that day, she foundered on 5 May (19°49′S 11°32′E).

=== 4 May ===
List of shipwrecks: 4 May 1997
Ship	State	Description
King Cruiser	Thailand	The ferry ran aground on the Anemone Reef, Andaman Sea, 10 nautical miles (19 km) off the Phi Phi Islands and sank. All on board, in excess of 560 people, were rescued.

=== 7 May ===
List of shipwrecks: 9 May 1997
Ship	State	Description
Ming Hui	China	The chemical tanker collided with Soon Li Fa (Sierra Leone) in the South China Sea (21°54′N 113°46′E). She caught fire and sank. Her eight crew were rescued.

=== 9 May ===
List of shipwrecks: 9 May 1997
Ship	State	Description
Beluga	United States	The 17-foot (5.2 m) pleasure craft was stranded on boulders on the coast of Cheval Island (59°46′N 149°31′W) in Resurrection Bay on the south-central coast of Alaska. The four people aboard abandoned her and were rescued by a United States Coast Guard helicopter.

=== 12 May ===
List of shipwrecks: 12 May 1997
Ship	State	Description
USS Richard S. Edwards	United States Navy	The decommissioned Forrest Sherman-class destroyer was sunk as a target in Pacific Ocean off Kauai, Hawaii.

=== 14 May ===
List of shipwrecks: 14 May 1997
Ship	State	Description
Jang Yung Lotus	South Korea	The cargo ship collided with Lucky Star (Flag unknown) and sank off Pusan (34°58′N 129°10′E). Her crew were rescued.

=== 15 May ===
List of shipwrecks: 15 May 1997
Ship	State	Description
Jain Hong 201	Taiwan	The fishing vessel caught fire in the Indian Ocean (6°30′N 62°13′E). She was taken in tow but subsequently foundered.

=== 16 May ===
List of shipwrecks: 16 May 1997
Ship	State	Description
Tenrei Maru No.25	Japan	The cargo ship collided with Musashino Maru (Japan) and sank 2 nautical miles (3.7 km) off the Shionomisaki Lighthouse.
Trident	United States	The 26-foot (7.9 m) salmon seiner sank in the Gulf of Alaska off Hinchinbrook Island, Alaska. The only person on board survived.

=== 18 May ===
List of shipwrecks: 18 May 1997
Ship	State	Description
Corsair	United States	The fishing vessel caught fire and sank in the Atlantic Ocean off Stonington, Maine. Her three crew were rescued.

=== 20 May ===
List of shipwrecks: 20 May 1997
Ship	State	Description
Mousse	France	The fishing vessel caught fire at Boulogne, Pas-de-Calais. She sank the next day. Later refloated and scrapped at Dunkerque, Nord.

=== 22 May ===
List of shipwrecks: 22 May 1997
Ship	State	Description
Katya V	Cyprus	The bulk carrier lost her propeller south of Zante, Greece. She was towed in to Piraeus, Greece. Declared a constructive total loss, she was towed to a Turkish port on 24 September for scrapping.

=== 29 May ===
List of shipwrecks: 29 May 1997
Ship	State	Description
Columbia	United States	The 75-foot (22.9 m) fish tender was destroyed by an engine room fire off the Barren Islands off the south-central coast of Alaska. The only person aboard survived.

=== Unknown date ===
List of shipwrecks: Unknown date in May 1997
Ship	State	Description
Danielle	Belize	The cargo ship foundered in Malaysian or Indonesian waters. Her crew were rescued.

== June ==
=== 2 June ===
List of shipwrecks: 2 June 1997
Ship	State	Description
Santa Maria	Venezuela	The fishing vessel foundered.

=== 4 June ===
List of shipwrecks: 4 June 1997
Ship	State	Description
Towing Witch	Saint Vincent and the Grenadines	The tug caught fire in the Atlantic Ocean 33°28′N 33°10′W). She was towed in to Ponta Delgada, Azores on 10 June. Declared a constructive total loss, she arrived at Vigo, Spain on 5 August for scrapping.

=== 6 June ===
List of shipwrecks: 6 June 1997
Ship	State	Description
Hakuo Maru No.20	Japan	The ship foundered off Vieux Fort, Saint Lucia.

=== 11 June ===
List of shipwrecks: 11 June 1997
Ship	State	Description
Rothenbach I	United States	The retired 165-foot (50.3 m) barge – previously the United States Navy non-self-propelled fuel oil barge YON-97 – was scuttled as an artificial reef in the North Atlantic Ocean off Cape May, New Jersey, at 38°53.368′N 074°39.800′W.

=== 12 June ===
List of shipwrecks: 12 June 1997
Ship	State	Description
Libra	United States	The retired 195-foot (59.4 m) gravel barge was scuttled as an artificial reef in the North Atlantic Ocean 4.5 nautical miles (8.3 km) off Ocean City, New Jersey, at 39°10.801′N 074°32.741′W.
Ryusei Maru	Japan	The cargo ship collided with Keiten (Flag unknown) and sank 4 nautical miles (7.4 km) off Tomakomai.

=== 13 June ===
List of shipwrecks: 13 June 1997
Ship	State	Description
Calarasi	Romania	The cargo ship foundered in the Indian Ocean 10 nautical miles (19 km) off Port St Johns, South Africa. One of her 21 crew was reported missing.

=== 15 June ===
List of shipwrecks: 15 June 1997
Ship	State	Description
Gandasuli	Indonesia	The cargo ship foundered in the Java Sea off Masalembu Island. Four of the seventeen people on board were reported missing.

=== 19 June ===
List of shipwrecks: 19 June 1997
Ship	State	Description
Arcadia Pride	India	The cargo ship capsized and sank 7 nautical miles (13 km) west of the Prong's Lighthouse (18°52′N 72°40′E) with the loss of six of her 33 crew. Eighteen people were reported missing.
Green Opal	Panama	The cargo ship collided with Sun Queen (Japan) and sank south of Kamogawa, Japan.

=== 23 June ===
List of shipwrecks: 23 June 1997
Ship	State	Description
Mark Christopher	United States	The 49-foot (14.9 m) salmon seiner ran aground and sank in Southeast Alaska 20 nautical miles (37 km) west of Sitka, Alaska. Her entire crew of five survived.

=== 26 June ===
List of shipwrecks: 26 June 1997
Ship	State	Description
Takasago Maru No.2	Japan	The LPG tanker foundered in Tokyo Bay off Haneda.

=== Unknown date ===
List of shipwrecks: Unknown date in June 1997
Ship	State	Description
Kathy & Maria	United States	The retired 64-foot (19.5 m) barge was cut in half and the two halves were scuttled separately as artificial reefs in the North Atlantic Ocean 4.5 nautical miles (8.3 km) off Ocean City, New Jersey, on 22 and 23 June 1997. One half, a 32-foot (9.8 m) section dubbed "Kathy," was scuttled at 39°10.719′N 074°33.259′W. The other half, a 32-foot (9.8 m) section dubbed "Maria," was scuttled at 39°10.814′N 074°33.044′W.

== July ==
=== 2 July ===
List of shipwrecks: 2 July 1997
Ship	State	Description
Diamond Grace	Panama	The supertanker ran aground in Tokyo Bay 4 nautical miles (7.4 km) off Yokohama, Japan.

=== 4 July ===
List of shipwrecks: 4 July 1997
Ship	State	Description
Maurelle	United States	The 36-foot (11.0 m) salmon troller suffered an explosion which ignited a fire that destroyed her off Southeast Alaska approximately 20 nautical miles (37 km) northwest of Cape Spencer. Her crew of three survived.

=== 6 July ===
List of shipwrecks: 6 July 1997
Ship	State	Description
Iluta Maru	Japan	The cargo ship collided with Sun Queen (Japan) and sank south of Kamogawa.

=== 7 July ===
List of shipwrecks: 7 July 1997
Ship	State	Description
Amitra	Ukraine	The cargo ship foundered in the Black Sea off Sinop, Turkey. Two of her crew were reported missing.

=== 11 July ===
List of shipwrecks: 11 July 1997
Ship	State	Description
Bifuku Maru	Japan	The cargo ship collided with the tanker Showa Maru (Flag unknown) and sank in Tokyo Bay (35°26′N 140°44′E).

=== 17 July ===
List of shipwrecks: 17 July 1997
Ship	State	Description
Comet	Greece	The cargo ship suffered an engine failure in the Mediterranean Sea 180 nautical miles (330 km) south east of Crete. She was towed to Syros, where she arrived on 24 July. Declared a constructive total loss, she arrived at Aliağa, Turkey in November for scrapping.

=== 20 July ===
List of shipwrecks: 20 July 1997
Ship	State	Description
Miss Mari	United States	The 28-foot (8.5 m) longline fishing vessel sank southwest of Elrington Island (60°00′N 148°03′W) in Prince William Sound on the south-central coast of Alaska. The fishing vessel Coho II (United States) rescued the only person on board.
Pasqualle	United States	The 32-foot (9.8 m) fishing vessel sank in the Gulf of Alaska west of Cape Fairweather (58°48′30″N 137°56′45″W) on the coast of Southeast Alaska after gear shifted and caused her to flood. The only person aboard survived.

=== 21 July ===
List of shipwrecks: 22 July 1997
Ship	State	Description
Galapagos	Honduras	The cargo ship foundered in the Caribbean Sea 170 nautical miles (310 km) south east of Kingston, Jamaica. Her crew were rescued.
Vertex	Thailand	The cargo ship caught fire 70 nautical miles (130 km) off the coast of Thailand. The fire was extinguished the next day. She was escorted in to Bangkok. Declared a constructive total loss, she was consequently scrapped.

=== 22 July ===
List of shipwrecks: 22 July 1997
Ship	State	Description
USS Stoddard	United States Navy	The decommissioned Fletcher-class destroyer was sunk in the Pacific Ocean 64 nautical miles (119 km; 74 mi) north-northwest of Kauai, Hawaii at 22°47′39.2″N 160°36′41″W by explosive charges planted by SEAL Team One.

=== 23 July ===
List of shipwrecks: 23 July 1997
Ship	State	Description
Ibis	Antigua and Barbuda	The cargo ship foundered in the Atlantic Ocean off Kenitra, Morocco (34°38′N 6°58′W). Her crew were rescued.

=== 26 July ===
List of shipwrecks: 26 July 1997
Ship	State	Description
Bianca N	Honduras	The cargo ship ran aground in the Indian Ocean (16°45′N 53°34′E). She subsequently broke in three and sank.
Quin Delta	United States	The 90-foot (27.4 m) fishing vessel was destroyed by fire in Bristol Bay off the coast of Alaska. Her crew of three abandoned ship in a life raft and was rescued by other fishing vessels.

== August ==
=== 2 August ===
List of shipwrecks: 2 August 1997
Ship	State	Description
Karakayalar	Turkey	The cargo ship collided with the ferry Suadiye (Turkey) and sank in the Sea of Marmara 1 nautical mile (1.9 km) off Heybeliada. Her five crew were rescued.
San Eduardo	Spain	The fishing vessel caught fire in the Atlantic Ocean (49°30′N 9°49′W). Her crew were rescued She was towed in to Ondarroa on 5 August. Declared a constructive total loss, she was scrapped.
Sea Empress	Saint Vincent and the Grenadines	The cargo ship foundered in the Indian Ocean 5 nautical miles (9.3 km) off Mandwa, India (18°46′N 72°45′E).
USS Southerland	United States Navy	The decommissioned Gearing-class destroyer was sunk as a missile target in the Pacific Ocean off the coast of California at 34°57′N 122°08′W.

=== 3 August ===
List of shipwrecks: 3 August 1997
Ship	State	Description
Macedon	Greece	The tug caught fire in the Mediterranean Sea 100 nautical miles (190 km) off the coast of Egypt. She was towed in the Thessaloniki on 10 August. Declared a constructive total loss, she was subsequently scrapped.

=== 7 August ===
List of shipwrecks: 7 August 1997
Ship	State	Description
ST-18	United States	Secured to the sunken wreck of the tug Rockland County by a heavy hawser, the retired 242-foot (73.8 m) tanker barge was scuttled with demolition charges as an artificial reef in the North Atlantic Ocean 3.6 nautical miles (6.7 km) off Sea Girt, New Jersey, in 70 feet (21 m) of water at 40°07.930′N 073°55.942′W. Her wreck is nicknamed "the Fisherman barge."
Vishva Nandini	India	The cargo ship struck a submerged wreck at Mumbai. She consequently sank on 19 August. Her 40 crew were rescued.

=== 13 August ===
List of shipwrecks: 13 August 1997
Ship	State	Description
Blue Fiord	United States	The 38-foot (11.6 m) salmon seiner sank off Evans Island in Prince William Sound on the south-central coast of Alaska due to flooding caused by the failure of a circulation pump. Her crew of four survived.
Gail S	United States	The 80-foot (24.4 m) tug capsized and sank with the loss of one life in Bristol Bay approximately 130 miles (210 km) north of Cold Bay, Alaska, while towing a 240-foot (73.2 m) barge. Four crew members survived. The barge remained tethered to the sunken Gail S and was salvaged.

=== 14 August ===
List of shipwrecks: 14 August 1997
Ship	State	Description
Blue Ox	United States	The 32-foot (9.8 m) longline fishing vessel sank 60 nautical miles (110 km) southwest of Homer, Alaska. Her crew of three survived.

=== 19 August ===
List of shipwrecks: 19 August 1997
Ship	State	Description
Anatoli I	Panama	The cargo ship foudered in the Pacific Ocean 250 nautical miles (460 km) west of Kagoshima, Japan (approximately 29°12′N 126°25′E) with the loss of one of her nineteen crew. Four people were reported missing.

=== 21 August ===
List of shipwrecks: 21 August 1997
Ship	State	Description
Kumano Maru No.81	Japan	The fishing vessel collided with Pacduke (Flag unknown) and sank in the Pacific Ocean 30 nautical miles (55 km) south east of the Akkeshi Lighthouse with the loss of one of her three crew. The other two were reported missing.

=== 24 August ===
List of shipwrecks: 24 August 1997
Ship	State	Description
Cry Havoc	United States	With no one on board, the 32-foot (9.8 m) salmon seiner was wrecked at Ugashik, Alaska.
Myrtle D	United States	The 33-foot (10.1 m) salmon troller was wrecked without loss of life at Elfin Cove, Alaska, after her operator fell asleep at her wheel.

=== 25 August ===
List of shipwrecks: 25 August 1997
Ship	State	Description
South Wind	United States	The 32-foot (9.8 m) salmon seiner was wrecked at Sand Point, Alaska. Her two crew members survived.

=== 26 August ===
List of shipwrecks: 26 August 1997
Ship	State	Description
Meridian	Thailand	The cargo ship foundered in the South China Sea (8°12′N 105°32′E). Her crew were rescued.

=== 28 August ===
List of shipwrecks: 28 August 1997
Ship	State	Description
Gino	Qatar	The cargo ship was presumed to have foundered in the Bay of Biscay approximately 100 nautical miles (190 km) north of A Coruña, Spain (44°52′N 8°35′W).
Liberta	Honduras	The cargo ship foundered in the Atlantic Ocean (39°10′N 3°11′E). Her crew were rescued.

== September ==
=== 7 September ===
List of shipwrecks: 7 September 1997
Ship	State	Description
North Islands	Cyprus	The cargo ship ran aground off San Antonio, Chile. Her crew were rescued. She subsequently broke in two. The stern section was scuttled.
Spyros	Panama	The cargo ship ran aground off the Isla de Pinos, Cuba.

=== 8 September ===
List of shipwrecks: 8 September 1997
Ship	State	Description
Fierté Gondávienne	Haiti	The sailing vessel sank in the Windward Passage with the loss of up to 400 lives.

=== 9 September ===
List of shipwrecks: 9 September 1997
Ship	State	Description
Cordiality	Panama	Sri Lankan civil war: The bulk carrier was attacked by rebels off Pulmoddai, Sri Lanka. She caught fire and consequently sank.

=== 10 September ===
List of shipwrecks: 10 September 1997
Ship	State	Description
Ronny	United States	With no one on board, the 46-foot (14.0 m) salmon seiner ran aground and sank in Stepovak Bay (55°40′N 159°50′W) on the Gulf of Alaska coast of the Alaska Peninsula in Alaska.

=== 12 September ===
List of shipwrecks: 12 September 1997
Ship	State	Description
Inharrime	Mozambique	The cargo ship suffered an engine failure at Maputo. She was anchored at 25°58′S 32°28′E. Subsequently foundered.
Luabo	Mozambique	The tanker suffered an engine failure at Maputo. She was anchored at 25°58′S 32°28′E. Subsequently foundered.
Macuse	Mozambique	The tanker suffered an engine failure at Maputo. She was anchored at 25°58′S 32°28′E. Subsequently foundered.

=== 15 September ===
List of shipwrecks: 15 September 1997
Ship	State	Description
Jerry	United States	The retired 42-foot (12.8 m) tug was scuttled as an artificial reef in the North Atlantic Ocean 6.5 nautical miles (12.0 km) off Harvey Cedars, New Jersey, in 80 feet (24 m) of water at 39°37.757′N 074°00.828′W.

=== 22 September ===
List of shipwrecks: 22 September 1997
Ship	State	Description
Troika	United States	The 50-foot (15 m) crab-fishing vessel sank in the Bering Sea about 12 nautical miles (22 km) southeast of Saint Paul Island in the Pribilof Islands. Three members of her four-man crew put on survival suits and survived, and they were rescued by the fishing vessel Gala Maureen (United States); the fourth, her captain, was not wearing a survival suit and died of hypothermia.

=== 24 September ===
List of shipwrecks: 24 September 1997
Ship	State	Description
Corriente	Hong Kong	The bulk carrier ran aground on Okinotori, Japan (20°24′N 136°06′E).
Kang	Saint Vincent and the Grenadines	The container ship arrived at Hong Kong under tow, having suffered an engine failure. Declared a constructive total loss, she departed on 15 October for Alang, India for scrapping.
Nilgiri	Sri Lanka	The offshore supply vessel capsized and sank in the Indian Ocean (6°49′N 79°48′E). Her crew were rescued.
Victoria Ann	United States	After a hull plank gave way, the 42-foot (13 m) seiner ran aground and sank in Hidden Basin, Ugak Bay, Alaska.

=== 26 September ===
List of shipwrecks: 26 September 1997
Ship	State	Description
ICL Vikraman	India	The bulk carrier collided with the ore-bulk-oil carrier Mount I (Flag unknown) off Port Dickson, Malaysia (2°18′N 101°51′E). She broke in two and sank with the loss of two of her 34 crew. Twenty-seven people were reported missing.

=== 27 September ===
List of shipwrecks: 27 September 1997
Ship	State	Description
Trina	United States	The 42-foot (13 m) longline cod-fishing vessel capsized and sank in the Gulf of Alaska near Perl Island off the coast of Alaska. The only person aboard abandoned ship in a life raft and was rescued by the fishing vessel Deva (United States).

=== Unknown date ===
List of shipwrecks: Unknown
Ship	State	Description
Nina T	United States	The 70-foot (21 m) fishing trawler was scuttled sometime in September in 100 feet (30 m) of water off Eastern Point in Gloucester, Massachusetts, at 42°34.133′N 070°40.522′W.

== October ==
=== 1 October ===
List of shipwrecks: 1 October 1997
Ship	State	Description
Janet	United States	The 85-foot (26 m) decommissioned tugboat was scuttled as an artificial reef in 93 feet (28 m) of water off Destin, Florida (30°15′N 86°23′W) in the Gulf of Mexico.

=== 6 October ===
List of shipwrecks: 6 October 1997
Ship	State	Description
Coastal Trader	United States	The 168.5-foot (51.4 m) fish tender's crew of seven abandoned her 70 nautical miles (130 km) off Cape Muzon on Dall Island in the Alexander Archipelago in Southeast Alaska near Dixon Entrance after she caught fire during a voyage from Saint Paul Island in the Bering Sea to Seattle, Washington. United States Coast Guard helicopters rescued her crew, and a salvage vessel towed her into port.

=== 8 October ===
List of shipwrecks: 8 October 1997
Ship	State	Description
USS YON-81	United States Navy	Loaded with discarded tires, the decommissioned 165-foot (50 m) non-self-propelled fuel oil barge was scuttled as an artificial reef in the North Atlantic Ocean 2 nautical miles (3.7 km) off Mantoloking, New Jersey, at 40°01.832′N 073°59.677′W. Her wreck is known as the "Captain Ed Schmidiger" barge.
USS YON-84	United States Navy	Loaded with discarded tires, the decommissioned 174-foot (53 m) non-self-propelled fuel oil barge was scuttled as an artificial reef in the North Atlantic Ocean 2 nautical miles (3.7 km) off Mantoloking, New Jersey, at 40°00.587′N 073°59.391′W. Her wreck is known as "Ocean Wreck Divers III."

=== 11 October ===
List of shipwrecks: 11 October 1997
Ship	State	Description
Sea Glider	United States	The 32-foot (9.8 m) salmon seiner sank in the Gulf of Alaska near the Barren Islands in the Kodiak Archipelago. A United States Coast Guard helicopter rescued her entire crew of four from a life raft.

=== 12 October ===
List of shipwrecks: 12 October 1997
Ship	State	Description
Capetan Tzannis	Panama	The cargo ship was driven ashore at Bayonne, Pyrenées-Atlantiques, France. She was refloated with the assistance of a number of tugs on 14 October. Declared a constructive total loss, she arrived at Gijón, Spain on 31 October for scrapping.

=== 13 October ===
List of shipwrecks: 13 October 1997
Ship	State	Description
Anna T	United States	The 27-foot (8.2 m) salmon seiner was burned and sank in Prince William Sound on the south-central coast of Alaska. The only person aboard survived.

=== 20 October ===
List of shipwrecks: 26 October 1997
Ship	State	Description
Black Sea T	Saint Vincent and the Grenadines	The cargo ship foundered in the Mediterranean Sea 4 nautical miles (7.4 km) off Cape Mastikho, Chios, Greece (38°09′N 25°55′E). One of her 24 crew was reported missing.
Corrinte	Hong Kong	Typhoon Joan: The bulk carrier sank at Okinotori, Japan (20°24′N 136°06′E).

=== 21 October ===
List of shipwrecks: 21 October 1997
Ship	State	Description
Baby Kay	United States	The fishing vessel foundered in the Gulf of Mexico off Corpus Christ, Texas. Her three crew were rescued.
Marine Star M	Honduras	The cargo ship collided with Dong Bang No.103 (Flag unknown) and sank 3.6 nautical miles (6.7 km) off Uido, South Korea. Five of her ten crew were reported missing.
Zakaria	Syria	The cargo ship foundered in the Mediterranean Sea 20 nautical miles (37 km) off Tartus with the loss of five of her ten crew.

=== 22 October ===
List of shipwrecks: 22 October 1997
Ship	State	Description
Als	Sierra Leone	The fishing vessel foundered in the Atlantic Ocean 300 nautical miles (560 km) south of Sierra Leone. Her eighteen crew were rescued.

=== 23 October ===
List of shipwrecks: 23 October 1997
Ship	State	Description
Vanessa	Bahamas	The refrigerated cargo ship foundered in the Atlantic Ocean 435 nautical miles (806 km) east of Saint John's, Newfoundland, Canada with the loss of four of her fifteen crew. One person was reported missing.

=== 26 October ===
List of shipwrecks: 26 October 1997
Ship	State	Description
Loose Goose Too	United States	The 26-foot (7.9 m) cabin cruiser disappeared in Kachemak Bay in Cook Inlet on the south-central coast of Alaska with the loss of both people on board.

=== 27 October ===
List of shipwrecks: 27 October 1997
Ship	State	Description
Sand Kite	United Kingdom	The cargo ship struck one of the piers of the Thames Barrier and sank. Later raised, repaired and returned to service.

=== 28 October ===
List of shipwrecks: 28 October 1997
Ship	State	Description
Memories	United States	After her operator fell asleep at her wheel, the 49-foot (14.9 m) shrimp pot fishing vessel ran aground and sank in Wrangell Narrows in the Alexander Archipelago in Southeast Alaska. Her crew of two survived.

== November ==
=== 2 November ===
List of shipwrecks: 2 November 1997
Ship	State	Description
Northern Voyager	United States	While undergoing sea trials after a refit, the 120-foot (36.6 m), 196-gross ton fishing vessel sank without loss of life in 175 feet (53 m) of water in the Atlantic Ocean off Gloucester, Massachusetts, 2.5 nautical miles (4.6 km) east of Eastern Point Light at 42°34.451′N 070°36.295′W.

=== 11 November ===
List of shipwrecks: 11 November 1997
Ship	State	Description
Chu Hai	China	The cargo ship collided with the ro-ro ship Asian Hibiscus (Indonesia) and sank in the Kanmon Strait (33°56′N 130°57′E) with the loss of two of her 24 crew.

=== 12 November ===
List of shipwrecks: 12 November 1997
Ship	State	Description
Don Ricardo	Antigua and Barbuda	The cargo ship collided with Muhieddiene VII (Syria) and foundered in the Mediterranean Sea off Kea, Greece (37°40′N 24°13′E) Five of her crew were reported missing.
Elizabeth	United States	The 47-foot (14.3 m) dive boat sank near Metlakatla, Alaska, after her cargo shifted. All four people on board survived.

=== 13 November ===
List of shipwrecks: 13 November 1997
Ship	State	Description
Aster	Mauritius	The refrigerated cargo ship ran aground at Rame Head, South Africa. She was scrapped in situ.

=== 15 November ===
List of shipwrecks: 15 November 1997
Ship	State	Description
Seiun Maru No.20	Japan	The cargo ship collided with Sumiho Maru No.75 (Japan). She capsized and sank 4.9 nautical miles (9 km) off Tanohata (39°54′N 142°02′E) with the loss of one of her five crew. Three people were reported missing.

=== 17 November ===
List of shipwrecks: 17 November 1997
Ship	State	Description
Constitution	United States	The ocean liner sank in the Pacific Ocean 700 nautical miles (1,300 km) north of Honolulu, Hawaii whilst under tow to the shipbreakers.

=== 19 November ===
List of shipwrecks: 19 November 1997
Ship	State	Description
Green Lily	Bahamas	The cargo ship ran aground at Bressay, Shetland Islands, United Kingdom (59°55′N 0°49′W) after her engine failed in a storm. All fifteen crew were rescued by the Lerwick lifeboat and a helicopter, although the winchman of the helicopter was killed after his winchline had to be cut.

=== 20 November ===
List of shipwrecks: 20 November 1997
Ship	State	Description
September Song	United States	The 33-foot (10 m) longline cod-fishing vessel flooded and sank in the Gulf of Alaska off Southeast Alaska southwest of Baranof Island (58°57′N 152°15′W) after her scuppers became clogged with fish. Both crew members survived.

=== 22 November ===
List of shipwrecks: 20 November 1997
Ship	State	Description
Apanchanit No.5	Thailand	.The LPG tanker capsized and sank 12 nautical miles (22 km) north east of the Mitsujima Lighthouse, Japan (34°48′N 129°41′E).

=== 23 November ===
List of shipwrecks: 23 November 1997
Ship	State	Description
Abdelrahman	Egypt	The cargo ship ran aground at Tulmaytha, Libya (32°43′N 20°57′E). She subsequently broke in two and was a total loss.

=== 24 November ===
List of shipwrecks: 24 November 1997
Ship	State	Description
MSC Carla	Panama	The container ship broke in two in the Atlantic Ocean (39°31′N 25°01′W). the bow section sank on 30 November. The stern section was towed to Gijón, Spain. Subsequently sold for scrapping.

=== 25 November ===
List of shipwrecks: 25 November 1997
Ship	State	Description
Captain Mike	United States	The fishing vessel caught fire, broke in two and sank in the Gulf of Mexico 100 nautical miles (190 km) south east of Cameron, Louisiana. Her three crew were rescued.
Junyo 1	Panama	The chemical tanker struck the breakwater and sank at Ulsan, South Korea. She was refloated on 23 January 1998. Declared a constructive total loss, she was towed to Pusan, South Korea for scrapping.

=== Unknown date ===
List of shipwrecks: Unknown date in November 1997
Ship	State	Description
Smena	Ukraine	The cargo ship collided with another vessel and sank at Yangon, Myanmar.

== December ==
=== 13 December ===
List of shipwrecks: 13 December 1997
Ship	State	Description
Equator Joy	Singapore	The cargo ship in the South China Sea (3°12′N 108°56′E). Her eighteen crew were rescued.

=== 14 December ===
List of shipwrecks: 14 December 1997
Ship	State	Description
HMAS Swan	Royal Australian Navy	The decommissioned River-class destroyer escort was scuttled in the Indian Ocean approximately 1.3 nautical miles (2.4 km) from Point Picquet near Dunsborough, Western Australia, at 33°33′02″S 115°06′02″E to serve as a recreational dive site.
The Living Christ	Haiti	The sailing ship sank off the Île de Gonâve, Haiti, with the loss of about 40 lives. There were 15 survivors reported.

=== 16 December ===
List of shipwrecks: 16 December 1997
Ship	State	Description
Gonave Express	Belize	The fishing vessel foundered in the Atlantic Ocean 55 nautical miles (102 km) south east of Miami, Florida. Her ten crew were rescued.

=== 19 December ===
List of shipwrecks: 19 December 1997
Ship	State	Description
Golden Eagle	United States	The retired 80-foot (24.4 m) fishing trawler was scuttled as an artificial reef in the North Atlantic Ocean 3.6 nautical miles (6.7 km) off Sea Girt, New Jersey, at 40°08.190′N 073°56.100′W.
Restorer	United States	While under tow with the retired fishing trawler Golden Eagle (United States) to a location 3.6 nautical miles (6.7 km) off Sea Girt, New Jersey, to be scuttled as an artificial reef, the retired 62-foot (18.9 m) tug sank unexpectedly in the North Atlantic Ocean at 40°08.005′N 073°56.025′W.

=== 20 December ===
List of shipwrecks: 20 December 1997
Ship	State	Description
Anjana	Bahamas	The cargo ship foundered in the North Sea (57°08′N 5°00′E). Her eleven crew were rescued.

=== 22 December ===
List of shipwrecks: 22 December 1997
Ship	State	Description
Callisto	United States	The 36-foot (11.0 m) salmon troller sank approximately 45 nautical miles (83 km) south of Sitka, Alaska. The only person aboard survived.

=== 25 December ===
List of shipwrecks: 25 December 1997
Ship	State	Description
Daikichi Maru No.18	Japan	The fishing vessel collided with the fishing vessel Hinode Maru No.51 (Japan) and sank in the Pacific Ocean off the Hawaiian Islands, United States. Her crew were rescued.

=== 29 December ===
List of shipwrecks: 29 December 1997
Ship	State	Description
Morning Dew	United States	The 34-foot (10.4 m) sailboat struck the rock jetty in the shipping channel of Charleston Harbor 32°49′N 79°55′W. All four people aboard died.

=== 30 December ===
List of shipwrecks: 30 December 1997
Ship	State	Description
Happy Hooker II	United States	The 28-foot (8.5 m) dive boat iced up, dragged her anchor, and sank in Alitak Bay 56°50′N 154°10′W on the coast of Alaska's Kodiak Island. All three people aboard survived.
Merchant Patriot	United Kingdom	The ship sprang a leak in her engine room and was abandoned off the Bahamas. Declared a constructive total loss, she was towed to Freeport, Bahamas for scrapping.

=== Unknown date ===
List of shipwrecks: Unknown date 1997
Ship	State	Description
Catalina	United States	Catalina, June 2011 The passenger ferry foundered at Ensenada, Baja California, Mexico.

== Unknown date ==
List of shipwrecks: Unknown date 1997
Ship	State	Description
Anafi	Unknown	Carrying a cargo of coal, the ship caught fire in the Piraeus Roads, Greece and was abandoned.
Brown Bear	United States	The motor vessel, a former research ship, was scuttled in the Pacific Ocean off San Diego, California, in late 1997 or in January 1998.
Christiana	Norway	The ketch foundered in the North Sea, and sank at a depth of 500 metres (1,640 ft) off Mandal, Norway. Later raised and repaired.
HMBS David Tucker	Royal Bahamas Defence Force	The decommissioned Cape-class patrol vessel was sunk as an artificial reef in the Bahamas.
Mr. J	United States	The crab processor – a former PCE-842-class patrol craft and auxiliary minelayer – was towed out into the Pacific Ocean and scuttled sometime in the 1990s.
