= List of shipwrecks in 1986 =

This list of shipwrecks in 1986 includes ships sunk, foundered, grounded, or otherwise lost during 1986.

table of contents
1986
Jan	Feb	Mar	Apr
May	Jun	Jul	Aug
Sep	Oct	Nov	Dec
Unknown date

== January ==
=== 6 January ===
List of shipwrecks: 6 January 1986
Ship	State	Description
Camelot	United States	The 40-foot (12.2 m) double-ended troller departed Sitka, Alaska, with two people and a Golden Retriever aboard to fish in the local area and was never heard from again. No trace of her or her occupants was ever found.

=== 11 January ===
List of shipwrecks: 11 January 1986
Ship	State	Description
Castillo de Salas	Spain	The bulk carrier was sunk after running aground over rocks in Gijón, Spain
Southern Quest	United Kingdom	The support ship was crushed by ice and sunk off Cape Evans, Ross Island, Antarctica.

=== 13 January ===
List of shipwrecks: 13 January 1986
Ship	State	Description
No. 138	South Yemen Navy	South Yemen Civil War: The Project 770 landing ship was bombed by a South Yemeni Air Force Sukhoi Su-7 aircraft and was beached and burned out in the harbor of Aden.

=== 14 January ===
List of shipwrecks: 14 January 1986
Ship	State	Description
Kosmos	Honduras	South Yemen Civil War: The cargo ship was shelled and sunk by artillery in the Harbor of Aden.

=== 23 January ===
List of shipwrecks: 23 January 1986
Ship	State	Description
Stanley Bay	United Kingdom	The cargo ship foundered in the Bay of Biscay off the north coast of Spain with the loss of three crew.

=== 25 January ===
List of shipwrecks: 25 January 1986
Ship	State	Description
Sea Warrior	flag unknown	The cargo ship was scuttled off Tunisia to become an artificial reef.

=== 28 January ===
List of shipwrecks: 28 January 1986
Ship	State	Description
Ebn Magid	Liberia	The cargo ship caught fire in the English Channel 21 nautical miles (39 km) off Portland Bill, Dorset and put into HMNB Portland. She was towed into Portland Harbour on 30 January and beached.

=== 31 January ===
List of shipwrecks: 31 January 1986
Ship	State	Description
Spartan	United States	The retired 85-foot (25.9 m) tug was scuttled as an artificial reef in the North Atlantic Ocean 3.6 nautical miles (6.7 km; 4.1 mi) off Sea Girt, New Jersey, in 70 feet (21 m) of water at 40°06.158′N 073°57.198′W.

=== Unknown date ===
List of shipwrecks: unknown January 1986
Ship	State	Description
Four patrol boats	South Yemen Navy	South Yemen Civil War: The "Tracker" type patrol boats were lost at Aden, unknown if by shelling or aircraft between 13–17 January.

== February ==
=== 11 February ===
List of shipwrecks: 11 February 1986
Ship	State	Description
Unity	Greece	The cargo ship sank off the Peloponnese with the loss of nine crew.

=== 12 February ===
List of shipwrecks: 12 February 1986
Ship	State	Description
Kodiak Prince	United States	The 26-foot (7.9 m) vessel capsized and sank off the southern tip of Kodiak Island in Alaska's Kodiak Archipelago.

=== 14 February ===
List of shipwrecks: 14 February 1986
Ship	State	Description
Rockland County	United States	The retired 105-foot (32 m) tug was scuttled as an artificial reef in the North Atlantic Ocean 3.6 nautical miles (6.7 km) off Sea Girt, New Jersey, in 80 feet (24 m) of water at 40°07.942′N 073°55.879′W.

=== 16 February ===
List of shipwrecks: 16 February 1986
Ship	State	Description
Mikhail Lermontov	Soviet Union	The passenger liner ran aground and sank near Picton, New Zealand.

=== 17 February ===
List of shipwrecks: 17 February 1986
Ship	State	Description
Chil Bo San No. 1	South Korea	The cargo ship departed Hokkaido, Japan, bound for Alaska and was never heard from again. She and her crew of 18 disappeared without trace.

=== 21 February ===
List of shipwrecks: 21 February 1986
Ship	State	Description
Snekkar Arctic	France	The 164-foot (50 m), 641-ton trawler foundered in stormy seas, sleet, and snow 360 miles (580 km) west of the Outer Hebrides and the same distance southeast of Keflavik. Nine crew were rescued, with the other 18 dead or reported missing.

=== 25 February ===
List of shipwrecks: 25 February 1986
Ship	State	Description
Sogn	United States	The 70-foot (21.3 m) fishing vessel caught fire and sank off Sitkalidak Island in the Kodiak Archipelago off the southeast coast of Kodiak Island off south-central Alaska. Her entire crew of three was rescued.

== March ==
=== 4 March ===
List of shipwrecks: 4 March 1986
Ship	State	Description
Tyke II	United States	The fishing vessel was wrecked near Rockwell Lighthouse (57°02′15″N 135°20′13″W) in Sitka Sound in Southeast Alaska.

=== 6 March ===
List of shipwrecks: 6 March 1986
Ship	State	Description
Thunderbolt	United States	The research ship was sunk as an artificial reef 4 nautical miles (4.6 mi; 7.4 km) south of Marathon and Key Colony Beach, Florida.

=== 20 March ===
List of shipwrecks: 20 March 1986
Ship	State	Description
Dawn Waters	United Kingdom	The 82-foot (25 m), 102-ton trawler foundered 12.5 miles (20.1 km) from Douglas in a hurricane with Force 10 winds and 30-foot (9.1 m) swells. Al five crew were killed.

=== 22 March ===
List of shipwrecks: 22 March 1986
Ship	State	Description
USS Secota	United States Navy	The harbor tug was sunk in a collision with the Ohio-class ballistic missile submarine USS Georgia (United States Navy) near Midway Island. Ten crewman were rescued and two died.

=== 23 March ===
List of shipwrecks: 23 March 1986
Ship	State	Description
Karelia	Finland	The cargo ship ran aground on Gotska Sandön, Sweden with the loss of six of her seventeen crew. Survivors were rescued by Swedish Air Force helicopters and a West German vessel.

=== 24 March ===
List of shipwrecks: 24 March 1986
Ship	State	Description
Ain Zaquit	Libyan Navy	Action in the Gulf of Sidra: The Nanuchka-class corvette was sunk US Navy Grumman A-6 Intruder aircraft with bombs and Harpoon missiles.
Waheed	Libyan Navy	Action in the Gulf of Sidra: The Beir Grassa-class missile boat sunk by the US 6th Fleet.

=== 26 March ===
List of shipwrecks: 26 March 1986
Ship	State	Description
Sand Pebble	United States	During a voyage in Southeast Alaska from Chichagof Island to Sitka, the cabin cruiser was wrecked on Low Island (57°00′40″N 135°36′35″W) in Sitka Sound. Three of the five people aboard died.

== April ==
=== 13 April ===
List of shipwrecks: 13 April 1986
Ship	State	Description
Francis S. Bushey	United States	The retired 247-foot (75.3 m) tanker was scuttled as an artificial reef in 100 feet (30 m) of water in the North Atlantic Ocean east of Ocean City, New Jersey, at 39°14.203′N 074°12.148′W.
USS Grayback	United States Navy	The decommissioned Grayback-class amphibious transport submarine was sunk as a target in the South China Sea near Subic Bay, the Philippines.

=== 24 April ===
List of shipwrecks: 24 April 1986
Ship	State	Description
USS Higbee	United States Navy	The decommissioned Gearing-class destroyer was sunk as a target in the Pacific Ocean about 130 nautical miles (240 km) west of San Diego, California, at 32°28′0.4″N 119°58′0.7″W.
Unidentified infiltration ship	Korean People's Navy	The infiltration ship was sunk by Republic of Korea Navy vessels. Two crewmen were killed and four wounded.

=== 26 April ===
List of shipwrecks: 26 April 1986
Ship	State	Description
Jhansi Ki Rani	India	The bulk carrier ran aground on the Frederick Reef (21°01′S 154°22′E). She was on a voyage from Newcastle, New South Wales, Australia to Higashi, Harima, Japan.

== May ==
=== 14 May ===
List of shipwrecks: 14 May 1986
Ship	State	Description
Pride of Baltimore	United States	The topsail schooner, capsized and sunk during a white squall 250 nautical miles (460 km) north of Puerto Rico.

=== 16 May ===
List of shipwrecks: 14 May 1986
Ship	State	Description
Bluebird II (or Blue Bird II)	United States	After she was stolen by two runaway teenage boys, the cabin cruiser sank near Harbor Island (59°40′N 149°39′W) on the south-central coast of Alaska, 32 nautical miles (59 km; 37 mi) southwest of Seward. Both boys perished.

=== 23 May ===
List of shipwrecks: 23 May 1986
Ship	State	Description
Wide Load	United States	After the bowpicker's tow line to the fishing vessel Mary Dee (United States) broke at ebb tide, she washed up on a sand bar, struck rocks, and capsized near the Copper River Delta in Alaska. Both of her crew members survived, and a United States Coast Guard helicopter picked them up.

=== 25 May ===
List of shipwrecks: 25 May 1986
Ship	State	Description
Shania	Bangladesh	The river ferry capsized and sank in the River Meghna with the loss of approximately 400 of the approximately 600 people on board.

=== 28 May ===
List of shipwrecks: 28 May 1986
Ship	State	Description
Chian Der 3	Republic of China	The fishing vessel was shelled and sunk in the South Atlantic over 150 nautical miles (280 km) off the Falkland Islands by Prefecto Derbes ( Argentine Coast Guard) with the loss of two of her 22 crew.

=== 30 May ===
List of shipwrecks: 30 May 1986
Ship	State	Description
Lora Lee	United States	The 32-foot (9.8 m) fishing vessel capsized and sank in the Gulf of Alaska approximately 10 nautical miles (19 km; 12 mi) south of Sequel Point (57°33′40″N 152°12′30″W) on the coast of Kodiak Island, Alaska. A United States Coast Guard helicopter rescued her crew of three.
Sea Raider	United States	A huge wave struck the fishing vessel in the Gulf of Alaska near Matushka Island (59°37′N 149°37′W) south of Seward, Alaska, causing her to flood and capsize. The fishing vessel Grand Mariner (United States) rescued two of her crewmen, and a United States Coast Guard helicopter rescued three others.
Shenandoah	United States	The fishing vessel sank near Seward, Alaska. The three people aboard put survival suits on, and the United States Coast Guard rescued them.

=== 31 May ===
List of shipwrecks: 31 May 1986
Ship	State	Description
Defiance	United States	The fishing vessel sank approximately 15 nautical miles (28 km; 17 mi) southwest of Cape Spencer in Southeast Alaska. The fishing vessel Adak (United States) rescued her entire crew of four.

== June ==
=== 1 June ===
List of shipwrecks: 1 June 1986
Ship	State	Description
Downeaster	United States	The fishing vessel sank in Lynn Canal in Southeast Alaska between Eldred Rock and Sullivan Island. The fishing vessel Genevieve (United States) rescued her crew of two from a life raft.

=== 6 June ===
List of shipwrecks: 6 June 1986
Ship	State	Description
Habana	Cuba	South African Border War: The cargo ship was sunk in Namibe harbor (today Moçâmedes), Angola by South African frogmen using limpet mines. Later raised but scuttled due to extensive damage.

=== 9 June ===
List of shipwrecks: 9 June 1986
Ship	State	Description
Irene Patras	Greece	Western Sahara War: The cargo ship ran aground near Cape Barbas, she was later attacked while aground by Polisario fighters. Declared a total loss.

=== 10 June ===
List of shipwrecks: 10 June 1986
Ship	State	Description
USS Bailer	United States Navy	The decommissioned 247-foot (75.3 m) self-propelled fuel oil barge was scuttled as an artificial reef in the North Atlantic Ocean 6.5 nautical miles (12.0 km; 7.5 mi) off Harvey Cedars, New Jersey, in 85 feet (26 m) of water at 39°37.727′N 074°01.079′W.

== July ==
=== 2 July ===
List of shipwrecks: 2 July 1986
Ship	State	Description
HMS Accord	Royal Navy	The Confiance-class tug was sunk as a target.

=== 7 July ===
List of shipwrecks: 7 July 1986
Ship	State	Description
Olaf	United Kingdom	The coaster sank off the coast of the Netherlands after her cargo shifted. All sixteen crew were rescued by a Royal Netherlands Navy helicopter.

=== 11 July ===
List of shipwrecks: 11 July 1986
Ship	State	Description
Jesica	Honduras	Sank off Lagos, Nigeria (6°23′N 3°25′E)

=== 13 July ===
List of shipwrecks: 13 July 1986
Ship	State	Description
Hua Li	Republic of China	Typhoon Peggy: The cargo ship foundered in the South China Sea. Fifteen crew were rescued by RFA Bayleaf (Royal Navy).

=== 19 July ===
List of shipwrecks: 19 July 1986
Ship	State	Description
Alice Kay	United States	The 36-foot (11 m) vessel burned and sank without loss of life off Cape Unalishagvak (57°32′45″N 155°43′40″W) on the south coast of the Alaska Peninsula in Alaska.

=== 25 July ===
List of shipwrecks: 25 July 1986
Ship	State	Description
Swenson I	United States	The retired 130-foot (39.6 m) barge was scuttled as an artificial reef in the North Atlantic Ocean 3.6 nautical miles (6.7 km; 4.1 mi) off Sea Girt, New Jersey, at 40°07.305′N 073°56.885′W.

== August ==
=== 10 August ===
List of shipwrecks: 10 August 1986
Ship	State	Description
Seagull II	United States	The converted landing craft disappeared in the Chukchi Sea during a voyage from Kotzebue to Deering, Alaska.

=== 12 August ===
List of shipwrecks: 12 August 1986
Ship	State	Description
Night Owl	United States	The gillnet fishing vessel sank in Cook Inlet on the south-central coast of Alaska. A United States Coast Guard helicopter rescued her crew of three.

=== 14 August ===
List of shipwrecks: 14 August 1986
Ship	State	Description
Gabriella	Netherlands Antilles	The heavy lift ship capsized and sank at Port Kembla, New South Wales, Australia, with the loss of a crew member. Refloated but declared a constructive total loss, she was towed out into the Tasman Sea and sunk on 10 December at 34°34′05″S 151°30′08″E.

=== 18 August ===
List of shipwrecks: 18 August 1986
Ship	State	Description
HMS Berwick	Royal Navy	The Rothesay-class frigate was sunk as a target.

=== 22 August ===
List of shipwrecks: 22 August 1986
Ship	State	Description
Kathy Lynn	United States	The 58-foot (17.7 m) fishing vessel was abandoned in Whale Pass (57°56′N 152°50′W) between Kodiak Island and Whale Island in Alaska's Kodiak Archipelago after she began to flood. The fishing vessel Fred J (United States) rescued her crew of three.

=== 31 August ===
List of shipwrecks: 31 August 1986
Ship	State	Description
Admiral Nakhimov	Soviet Union	During a voyage from Novorossiysk to Sochi, the passenger liner sank in 150 feet (46 m) of water in the Black Sea 2 nautical miles (3.7 km; 2.3 mi) off the coast of the Soviet Union and 8 nautical miles (15 km; 9.2 mi) southeast of Novorossiysk seven minutes after colliding with the bulk carrier Pyotr Vasev (Soviet Union). Of the 1,234 people on board, 423 — 359 passengers and 64 members of her crew — perished.

=== Unknown date ===
List of shipwrecks: Unknown date in August 1986
Ship	State	Description
HMS Confident	Royal Navy	The Confiance-class tug was sunk as a target.

== September ==
=== 10 September ===
List of shipwrecks: 10 September 1986
Ship	State	Description
Mary Anne	United States	The 34-foot (10.4 m) fishing vessel was lost on the coast of Kodiak Island between Karluk and Red River Lagoon.
Rhea C	United States	The purse seiner struck a rock and sank in the Gulf of Alaska approximately 35 nautical miles (65 km; 40 mi) southeast of Homer, Alaska. Her crew of five abandoned ship in a life raft, reached shore, and spent five days on a beach before being rescued by a United States Coast Guard helicopter.

=== 11 September ===
List of shipwrecks: 11 September 1986
Ship	State	Description
Normar II	United States	The fishing vessel was swamped and capsized with the loss of four lives in the Bering Sea approximately 120 nautical miles (220 km; 140 mi) northwest of Saint Paul Island.

== October ==
=== 10 October ===
List of shipwrecks: 10 October 1986
Ship	State	Description
Murmajo	Canada	The cargo ship caught fire and sank in the Bay of Fundy.

=== 15 October ===
List of shipwrecks: 15 October 1986
Ship	State	Description
Gold N Sun	United States	The 127-foot (38.7 m) fishing vessel sank near Unimak Pass approximately 15 nautical miles (28 km; 17 mi) northwest of Cape Sarichef on the coast of Unimak Island in the Aleutian Islands. Her crew of six survived.

=== 16 October ===
List of shipwrecks: 16 October 1986
Ship	State	Description
Laita	United States	After her engine and pilothouse were removed and clam dredges added to her, the retired 120-foot (36.6 m) fishing trawler was scuttled as an artificial reef in the North Atlantic Ocean off Cape May, New Jersey, in 65 feet (20 m) of water at 38°51.860′N 074°42.965′W.

=== 22 October ===
List of shipwrecks: 22 October 1986
Ship	State	Description
Cape Uyak	United States	While moored at Kodiak, Alaska, the 34-foot (10.4 m) fishing vessel was gutted by a fire that began in her galley. One man on board died of carbon monoxide poisoning.

=== 30 October ===
List of shipwrecks: 30 October 1986
Ship	State	Description
Danube	United States	The 15-gross register ton, 39-foot (11.9 m) or 43-foot (13.1 m) troller sank 0.25 nautical miles (0.5 km; 0.3 mi) southeast of Marmion Island (58°11′55″N 134°15′20″W) in Southeast Alaska southeast of Juneau, Alaska. The bodies of the three men on board were never found.

== November ==
=== 9 November ===
List of shipwrecks: 9 November 1986
Ship	State	Description
Hvalur 6	Iceland	The whaler was sabotaged and sunk by anti-whaling protestors at Reykjavík. She was refloated on 18 November but was not repaired.

=== 22 November ===
List of shipwrecks: 22 November 1986
Ship	State	Description
Kowloon Bridge	Hong Kong	The bulk carrier ran aground on a reef off the coast of County Cork, Ireland. She broke in three and sank the following spring and was a total loss.

=== 29 November ===
List of shipwrecks: 29 November 1986
Ship	State	Description
Ocean Prince	United States	The retired 200-foot (61 m) floating drydock was scuttled as an artificial reef in the North Atlantic Ocean off Fire Island south of Long Island, New York.

== December ==
=== 6 December ===
List of shipwrecks: 6 December
Ship	State	Description
Svalan	Cyprus	Lebanese Civil War: The hydrofoil boat was sunk by a bomb at Messina, Italy. Who hired the boat and who bombed it is unclear.
Tarnan	Cyprus	Lebanese Civil War: The hydrofoil boat was sunk by a bomb at Messina, Italy. Who hired the boat and who bombed it is unclear.

=== 19 December ===
List of shipwrecks: 19 December 1986
Ship	State	Description
Brave Themis	Cyprus	The cargo ship sank off Crete.
Laura	United States	The fishing trawler sank in 50-foot (15.2 m) seas in the Shelikof Strait near Wide Bay (57°22′N 156°11′W) on the south coast of the Alaska Peninsula. A United States Coast Guard helicopter rescued two crew members.

=== 24 December ===
List of shipwrecks: 24 December 1986
Ship	State	Description
Sudurland	Iceland	The cargo ship sank in the Norwegian Sea 300 nautical miles (560 km) north of the Faroe Islands with the loss of six of her crew of eleven. Survivors were rescued by a Lynx helicopter from HDMS Vædderen (Royal Danish Navy).

=== 25 December ===
List of shipwrecks: 25 December 1986
Ship	State	Description
Stainless Trader	Cyprus	The cargo ship foundered in the Mediterranean Sea 20 nautical miles (37 km) south of Sardinia, Italy with the loss of two of her eighteen crew.
Syneta	United Kingdom	The tanker ran aground at Skrurdur Island, Iceland and was wrecked with the loss all 12 crew.

== Unknown date ==
List of shipwrecks: Unknown date 1986
Ship	State	Description
Crusader II	Australia	The self-propelled coral barge was sunk at Flinders Reef off Cape Moreton, Queensland, Australia, to serve as a recreational dive site.
