= List of shipwrecks in 1995 =

The list of shipwrecks in 1995 includes ships sunk, foundered, grounded, or otherwise lost during 1995.

table of contents
1995
| Jan | Feb | Mar | Apr |
| May | Jun | Jul | Aug |
| Sep | Oct | Nov | Dec |
Unknown date

== January ==
=== 15 January ===
List of shipwrecks: 15 January 1995
| Ship | State | Description |
|---|---|---|
| Northwest Mariner | United States | The 93-foot (28.3 m) crab-fishing vessel sank with the loss of her entire crew of six in the Bering Sea approximately 140 nautical miles (260 km; 160 mi) northwest of Saint Paul Island. |

=== 16 January ===
List of shipwrecks: 16 January 1995
| Ship | State | Description |
|---|---|---|
| Alaskan Star | United States | The 86-foot (26.2 m) stern trawler capsized and sank quickly in 1,000 feet (300 m) of water near Forrester Island in Southeast Alaska after a catastrophic hull failure in her engine room or shaft alley. Her crew of four abandoned ship in survival suits and was rescued by the vessel Pacific Alliance (United States). |

=== 19 January ===
List of shipwrecks: 19 January 1995
| Ship | State | Description |
|---|---|---|
| Hustler | United States | The 62-foot (18.9 m) fishing vessel was wrecked near Narrow Cape (57°25′30″N 152°20′00″W) on the coast of Kodiak Island in Alaska′s Kodiak Archipelago. Her crew of five survived. |

=== 27 January ===
List of shipwrecks: 27 January 1995
| Ship | State | Description |
|---|---|---|
| Sugar Bear | United States | The 71-foot (21.6 m) crab-fishing vessel capsized and sank in the Bering Sea approximately 50 nautical miles (93 km; 58 mi) southwest of Saint Paul Island. Her crew of six abandoned ship in a life raft, where one of them died. The other five were rescued. |

=== Unknown date ===
List of shipwrecks: Unknown January 1995
| Ship | State | Description |
|---|---|---|
| Mara | United Kingdom | The abandoned fishing vessel/dive boat/fish research vessel sank in the "Central Gut" (Gutter Sound?) Scapa Flow, Orkney Islands. |

== February ==
=== 3 February ===
List of shipwrecks: 3 February 1995
| Ship | State | Description |
|---|---|---|
| Kalugin | United States | The 37-foot (11.3 m) fishing vessel ran onto the beach and broke up in Resurrection Bay on the south-central coast of Alaska. Her crew of two survived. |

=== 13 February ===
List of shipwrecks: 13 February 1995
| Ship | State | Description |
|---|---|---|
| Northern Lady | United States | The 98-foot (29.9 m) crab-fishing vessel burned and sank in the Bering Sea northwest of Saint Paul Island. Another fishing vessel rescued her entire crew of six. |

=== 24 February ===
List of shipwrecks: 24 February 1995
| Ship | State | Description |
|---|---|---|
| Camperdown | Canada | The coaster was wrecked at Little Thrum Cap, Canada. |

== March ==
=== 17 March ===
List of shipwrecks: 17 March 1995
| Ship | State | Description |
|---|---|---|
| Melissa Rae | United States | The 50-foot (15.2 m) cod-fishing trawler capsized due to icing and sank near Cold Bay, Alaska, 45 nautical miles (83 km; 52 mi) from King Cove, Alaska. Her crew of four survived. |
| Stolen motorboat | Canada | Six teenage boys stole a boat from the Pickering, Ontario marina and took it on a joyride through Lake Ontario. No sign of the teenagers or the boat has been found since. |

=== 21 March ===
List of shipwrecks: 21 March 1995
| Ship | State | Description |
|---|---|---|
| Gray Ghost | United States | The 35-foot (10.7 m) salmon troller sank approximately 25 nautical miles (46 km; 29 mi) southwest of Juneau, Alaska, near Whitestone Harbor (58°04′N 135°04′W) in Southeast Alaska. The fishing vessel Hoover (United States) rescued both men who had been aboard, but one of them died soon afterward. |

== April ==
=== 19 April ===
List of shipwrecks: 19 April 1995
| Ship | State | Description |
|---|---|---|
| SLNS Ranasuru | Sri Lanka Navy | Sri Lankan Civil War: Trincomalee Harbour Raid: The Type 062 patrol craft was sunk at Trincomalee, Sri Lanka, by Liberation Tigers of Tamil Eelam (LTTE) frogmen. 16 crewmen were killed and 21 wounded between the two ships. Four LTTE frogmen were killed. |
| SLNS Sooraya | Sri Lanka Navy | Sri Lankan Civil War: Trincomalee Harbour Raid: The Type 062 patrol craft was sunk at Trincomalee, Sri Lanka, by Liberation Tigers of Tamil Eelam frogmen. |

=== 21 April ===
List of shipwrecks: 21 April 1995
| Ship | State | Description |
|---|---|---|
| Rocinante | United States | The 31-foot (9.4 m) longline fishing vessel broached, capsized, and sank in the northwestern Gulf of Alaska. The only person aboard abandoned ship in a life raft and survived. |

=== 29 April ===
List of shipwrecks: 29 April 1995
| Ship | State | Description |
|---|---|---|
| Linda E | United States | The 45-foot (13.7 m) fishing vessel was abandoned after striking a submerged object off Point Howard (56°04′10″N 134°13′45″W) in Southeast Alaska, 9 nautical miles (17 km; 10 mi) north of Cape Decision, Alaska. Her crew of four, wearing survival suits, was rescued by the fishing vessel Connie Marie (United States). |

== May ==
=== 5 May ===
List of shipwrecks: 5 May 1995
| Ship | State | Description |
|---|---|---|
| Cordova | United States | The 82.3-foot (25.1 m) crab-fishing vessel sank in the Bering Sea approximately 85 nautical miles (157 km; 98 mi) north of Cold Bay, Alaska. Wearing survival suits, her crew of four abandoned ship in a life raft and was rescued by the fishing vessel Lady Kodiak (United States). |

=== 8 May ===
List of shipwrecks: 8 May 1995
| Ship | State | Description |
|---|---|---|
| Lucky Pierre | United States | The fishing vessel capsized and sank off the coast of Alaska′s Kodiak Island in Ugak Bay (57.4517°N 152.7019°W) near Narrow Cape (57°25′30″N 152°20′00″W). The fishing vessel Progress (United States) rescued both people on board. |

=== 16 May ===
List of shipwrecks: 16 May 1995
| Ship | State | Description |
|---|---|---|
| Unidentified motor lifeboat | United States Coast Guard | The decommissioned 44-foot (13.4 m) motor lifeboat was scuttled as an artificial reef in the North Atlantic Ocean 5.1 nautical miles (9.4 km; 5.9 mi) off Spray Beach, New Jersey, in 80 feet (24 m) of water at 39°33.496′N 074°05.991′W. Her wreck is nicknamed the "VHFC" wreck. |

=== 25 May ===
List of shipwrecks: 25 May 1995
| Ship | State | Description |
|---|---|---|
| HDMS Y 375 | Royal Danish Navy | The ship Botved-class guardship caught fire and sank in the Kattegat. Subsequently salvaged and scrapped. |

=== 30 May ===
List of shipwrecks: 30 May 1995
| Ship | State | Description |
|---|---|---|
| Maria Asumpta | United Kingdom | The brig ran aground at Padstow, Cornwall and was wrecked with the loss of three crew. |

== June ==
=== 9 June ===
List of shipwrecks: 9 June 1995
| Ship | State | Description |
|---|---|---|
| Big Mama | United States | The retired 103-foot (31.4 m) tug was scuttled as an artificial reef in 75 feet (23 m) of water in the North Atlantic Ocean east of Ocean City, New Jersey, at 39°13.961′N 074°12.926′W. |

=== 21 June ===
List of shipwrecks: 21 June 1995
| Ship | State | Description |
|---|---|---|
| Coleman II | United States | The retired 60-foot (18.3 m) barge was scuttled as an artificial reef in the North Atlantic Ocean 6.5 nautical miles (12.0 km; 7.5 mi) off Harvey Cedars, New Jersey, in 80 feet (24 m) of water at 39°37.296′N 074°01.214′W. |
| Weeks 218 | United States | The retired 106-foot (32.3 m) barge was scuttled as an artificial reef in the North Atlantic Ocean 6.5 nautical miles (12.0 km; 7.5 mi) off Harvey Cedars, New Jersey, in 80 feet (24 m) of water at 39°37.628′N 074°01.643′W by United States Navy SEALs conducting a demolition exercise. |

=== 22 June ===
List of shipwrecks: 22 June 1995
| Ship | State | Description |
|---|---|---|
| Mineral Dampier | Liberia | The cargo ship collided with Hanjin Madras (Liberia) and sank 160 nautical miles (300 km; 180 mi) south of Cheju Island, South Korea (30°32′N 126°15′E). |

== July ==
=== 10 July ===
List of shipwrecks: 10 July 1995
| Ship | State | Description |
|---|---|---|
| Iron Baron | Australia | The bulk carrier ran aground on the Hebe Reef off Tasmania. Refloated on 16 July but declared a constructive total loss. She was scuttled 46 nautical miles (85 km) east of Flinders Island, Tasmania on 30 July. |
| Yolanda M | United States | The 32-foot (9.8 m) salmon seiner sank without loss of life at Egegik, Alaska, after colliding with the fishing vessel Vortex (United States). |

=== 11 July ===
List of shipwrecks: 11 July 1995
| Ship | State | Description |
|---|---|---|
| Unidentified motor lifeboat | United States Coast Guard | The decommissioned 44-foot (13.4 m) motor lifeboat was scuttled as an artificial reef in the North Atlantic Ocean 5.1 nautical miles (9.4 km; 5.9 mi) off Spray Beach, New Jersey, in 60 feet (18 m) of water at 39°33.426′N 074°05.973′W. Her wreck is nicknamed "Ocean Wreck Divers I." |

=== 16 July ===
List of shipwrecks: 16 July 1995
| Ship | State | Description |
|---|---|---|
| SLNS Edithara | Sri Lanka Navy | Sri Lankan Civil War: The surveillance ship, damaged in May 1991 by Liberation Tigers of Tamil Eelam (LTTE) explosive motorboats and not repaired, was sunk in port by LTTE frogmen. |

=== 17 July ===
List of shipwrecks: 17 July 1995
| Ship | State | Description |
|---|---|---|
| Joseph | United States | The 50-foot (15.2 m) salmon seiner ran aground on Point Augusta (58°02′25″N 134°57′00″W) in Southeast Alaska and sank. Another fishing vessel rescued her crew of five. |

=== 20 July ===
List of shipwrecks: 20 July 1995
| Ship | State | Description |
|---|---|---|
| Duke of Argyll | Honduras | The passenger ship was damaged by fire at Hong Kong. She was declared a constructive total loss and consequently scrapped. |

=== 27 July ===
List of shipwrecks: 27 July 1995
| Ship | State | Description |
|---|---|---|
| Anna K | United States | The 82-foot (25.0 m) fish tender burned to the waterline and sank in Dixon Entrance in Southeast Alaska off Kanagunut Island (54°44′30″N 130°42′30″W). Her crew of four survived. |
| Miranda Rose | United States | The 42-foot (12.8 m) salmon seiner sank after colliding with the fishing vessel Primus (United States) west of Rocky Point (57°39′45″N 154°13′50″W) in the Shelikof Strait between Kodiak Island and the Alaska Peninsula. Her crew of four survived. |

=== 31 July ===
List of shipwrecks: 31 July 1995
| Ship | State | Description |
|---|---|---|
| #9 | United States | The retired 40-foot (12.2 m) tow boat was scuttled as an artificial reef in the North Atlantic Ocean 3.1 nautical miles (5.7 km; 3.6 mi) off Barnegat, New Jersey, at 39°45.127′N 074°01.297′W. |

== August ==
=== 2 August ===
List of shipwrecks: 2 August 1995
| Ship | State | Description |
|---|---|---|
| Club Royale | United States | Hurricane Erin: The casino ship sank in the Atlantic Ocean off West Palm Beach, Florida with the loss of three of her eleven crew. |

=== 10 August ===
List of shipwrecks: 10 August 1995
| Ship | State | Description |
|---|---|---|
| Summer Gale | United States | The 44-foot (13.4 m) salmon seiner was wrecked on Twoheaded Island (56°54′N 153°35′W) in the Kodiak Archipelago. All five people on board survived. |

=== 15 August ===
List of shipwrecks: 15 August 1995
| Ship | State | Description |
|---|---|---|
| Fox | United States | The 31-foot (9.4 m) salmon seiner capsized and sank in Smugglers Cove in Southeast Alaska after her cargo of fish shifted. It is not clear whether she sank in Smugglers Cove at 58°20′50″N 134°58′45″W or Smugglers Cove at 55.5866667°N 131.9555556°W. Her crew of five survived. |

=== 22 August ===
List of shipwrecks: 22 August 1995
| Ship | State | Description |
|---|---|---|
| Lady Joann | United States | The 34-foot (10.4 m) fishing vessel sank at Cold Bay, Alaska. All three people aboard survived. |

=== 23 August ===
List of shipwrecks: 23 August 1995
| Ship | State | Description |
|---|---|---|
| Moriah | United States | The 68-foot (20.7 m) longline fishing vessel struck a submerged rock and sank off Segula Island in the Aleutian Islands. Her crew of seven survived. |

=== 29 August ===
List of shipwrecks: 29 August 1995
| Ship | State | Description |
|---|---|---|
| SLNS P-456 | Sri Lanka Navy | Sri Lankan Civil War: The Dvora-class patrol boat was sunk by the Liberation Tigers of Tamil Eelam. |
| SLNS P-463 | Sri Lanka Navy | Sri Lankan Civil War: The Super Dvora Mk II-class patrol boat was sunk by the Liberation Tigers of Tamil Eelam. |
| SLNS P-464 | Sri Lanka Navy | Sri Lankan Civil War: The Super Dvora Mk II-class patrol boat was sunk by the Liberation Tigers of Tamil Eelam. |

== September ==
=== 16 September ===
List of shipwrecks: 16 September 1995
| Ship | State | Description |
|---|---|---|
| WIT Concrete II | United States | Hurricane Marilyn: The 375-foot (114 m), 5,410-ton, former YOG-40-class oil barge sank near Crown Bay, Saint Thomas, U.S. Virgin Islands. |

=== 19 September ===
List of shipwrecks: 19 September 1995
| Ship | State | Description |
|---|---|---|
| Jean Elizabeth | United States | The retired 195-foot (59.4 m) steel-hulled barge was scuttled as an artificial reef in the North Atlantic Ocean south of Long Island 2.5 nautical miles (4.6 km; 2.9 mi) off Moriches Inlet, New York. |

=== 25 September ===
List of shipwrecks: 25 September 1995
| Ship | State | Description |
|---|---|---|
| Hoover | United States | The 62-foot (18.9 m) longline halibut-fishing vessel was wrecked on the coast of Kruzof Island n the Alexander Archipelago in Southeast Alaska 1 nautical mile (1.9 km; 1.2 mi) north of Shoal Point (57°00′40″N 135°38′00″W). Her crew of six survived. An attempt to salvage her failed. |
| Troydon | United States | The 90-foot (27 m) hydraulic clam dredge sank without loss of life in 135 feet (41 m) of water in the Atlantic Ocean off the coast of Rhode Island 8 nautical miles (15 km; 9.2 mi) east of Block Island at 41°08.12′N 071°21.70′W due to an intake pump failure. |

== October ==
=== 19 October ===
List of shipwrecks: 19 October 1995
| Ship | State | Description |
|---|---|---|
| Royal Baron | United States | Soon after running aground and being refloated, the 90-foot (27.4 m) fishing vessel sank in heavy seas approximately 3 nautical miles (5.6 km; 3.5 mi) off Spruce Island in the Kodiak Archipelago near Sunny Cove (57°54′10″N 152°25′35″W). Her crew of three survived. |

=== 31 October ===
List of shipwrecks: 31 October 1995
| Ship | State | Description |
|---|---|---|
| Yakutat Eagle | United States | The 48-foot (14.6 m) crab-fishing vessel sank in the Gulf of Alaska outside of Icy Bay. |

== November ==
=== 1 November ===
List of shipwrecks: 1 November 1995
| Ship | State | Description |
|---|---|---|
| Roxanne | United States | The 35-foot (10.7 m) fishing vessel burned and sank while under tow in the Bering Sea near Saint Paul Island in the Pribilof Islands. |

=== 15 November ===
List of shipwrecks: 15 November 1995
| Ship | State | Description |
|---|---|---|
| Carrickatine | Ireland | The 85-foot (25.9 m) fishing vessel went missing with her full crew of six off Stanton banks, 50 miles (80.5 km) north of Malin Head, Ireland. Despite the largest sea search operation in the history of the Irish State, the vessel was not located. |

=== 17 November ===
List of shipwrecks: 17 November 1995
| Ship | State | Description |
|---|---|---|
| Cygnet | United States | The 72-foot (21.9 m) fishing vessel sank off Flat Island (59°19′45″N 151°59′45″W) in Cook Inlet on the south-central coast of Alaska. The two people aboard survived. |

== December ==
=== 1 December ===
List of shipwrecks: 1 December 1995
| Ship | State | Description |
|---|---|---|
| Tongass | United States | The 110-foot (33.5 m) tug capsized and sank in heavy weather near Hump Island (58°27′30″N 134°59′00″W) north of Point Retreat in Southeast Alaska. One crew member was rescued, but Tongass′s captain perished. |

=== 12 December ===
List of shipwrecks: 12 December 1995
| Ship | State | Description |
|---|---|---|
| Alaskan Spirit | United States | The 28-foot (8.5 m) sea cucumber and sea urchin dive boat sank in Stone Rock Bay (54°45′30″N 132°00′00″W) in Southeast Alaska. All three people on board survived. |

== Unknown date ==
List of shipwrecks: Unknown date 1995
| Ship | State | Description |
|---|---|---|
| HMPNGS Aitape | Papua New Guinea Defence Force | The decommissioned Attack-class patrol boat was scuttled south east of Port Moresby, Papua New Guinea as a diving reef sometime in 1995. |
| HMCS Assiniboine | Royal Canadian Navy | The decommissioned St. Laurent-class destroyer sank under tow in the Caribbean Sea sometime in 1995. |
| Imperial Eagle | Malta | The ferry was scuttled in the Mediterranean Sea off Qawra as an artificial reef. |
| Mr. J | United States | The crab processor – a former PCE-842-class patrol craft and auxiliary minelayer – was towed out into the Pacific Ocean and scuttled sometime in the 1990s. |
