= MV Brown Bear =

American research vessel

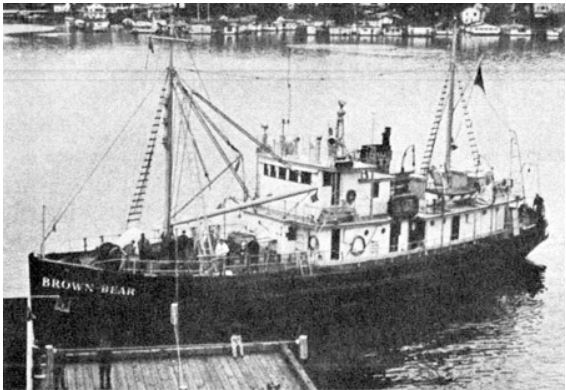

United States
- Name: MV Brown Bear
- Namesake: Brown bear
- Operator: U.S. Bureau of Biological Survey and Alaska Game Commission
- Builder: Winslow Marine Railway & Shipbuilding Company, Bainbridge Island, Washington
- Cost: US$125,000
- Launched: 7 November 1934
- Fate: Transferred to U.S. Fish and Wildlife Service 30 June 1940

U.S. Fish and Wildlife Service
- Name: MV Brown Bear
- Namesake: Previous name retained
- Acquired: From U.S. Bureau of Biological Survey 30 June 1940
- Fate: Transferred to United States Navy 5 January 1942
- Acquired: Transferred from U.S. Navy 28 March 1946
- Fate: Transferred to United States Navy May 1951
- Acquired: Transferred from U.S. Navy 28 March 1946
- Fate: Transferred to United States Navy May 1951
- Acquired: From University of Washington 1965
- Fate: Transferred to National Oceanic and Atmospheric Administration 3 October 1970

United States Navy
- Name: USS YP-197
- Acquired: From U.S. Fish and Wildlife Service 5 January 1942
- Decommissioned: 27 November 1945
- Fate: Transferred to U.S. Fish and Wildlife Service 28 March 1946
- Notes: Manned by United States Coast Guard personnel 5 January 1942–27 November 1945
- Acquired: Transferred from U.S. Fish and Wildlife Service May 1951
- Fate: Transferred to University of Washington by summer 1952

United States
- Name: MV Brown Bear
- Namesake: Previous name retained
- Operator: University of Washington
- Acquired: From U.S. Navy by summer 1952
- Fate: Transferred to U.S. Fish and Wildlife Service 1965

National Oceanic and Atmospheric Administration
- Name: MV Brown Bear
- Namesake: Previous name retained
- Acquired: From U.S.Fish and Wildlife Service 3 October 1970
- Decommissioned: 1972
- Fate: Sold into commercial service; Scuttled 1997 or 1998

General characteristics as Fish and Wildlife Service vessel
- Type: Research vessel
- Tonnage: 300 gross tons
- Length: 114 ft (35 m)
- Beam: 27 ft (8.2 m)
- Draft: 13 ft (4.0 m)
- Propulsion: Two 200-hp (169-kw) Washington Iron Works diesel engines
- Speed: 8.5 knots (16 km/h)
- Range: 4,000 nautical miles (7,400 km) to 5,400 nautical miles (10,000 km)
- Boats & landing craft carried: One tender with 10-horsepower (8.5-kilowatt) Kermath Marine Engines engine
- Crew: Accommodation for 16 crew and scientists

MV Brown Bear was an American research vessel in commission in the fleet of the United States Department of Agriculture′s Bureau of Biological Survey and Alaska Game Commission from 1934 to 1940 and in the fleet of the United States Department of the Interior′s Fish and Wildlife Service from 1940 to 1942 and from 1946 to 1951, under the control of the University of Washington from 1952 to 1965, and in commission in the fleet of the United States Fish and Wildlife Service from 1965 to 1970 and of the National Oceanic and Atmospheric Administration′s National Marine Fisheries Service (NMFS) from 1970 to 1972.

Early in World War II, the ship was transferred from the FWS to the United States Navy for war service and renamed USS YP-197. Immediately transferred to the United States Coast Guard, she operated as a Coast Guard vessel from 1942 to 1945.

After her NMFS service, the ship operated commercially as the dive tender MV Baja Explorador before returning to her original name. She fell into disrepair and was scuttled in late 1997 or in January 1998.

== Construction and commissioning ==
The U.S. Works Progress Administration allocated US$125,000 to the design and construction of Brown Bear for use by both the United States Department of Agroiulture′s Bureau of Biological Survey and the United States Government′s Alaska Game Commission. The Seattle, Washington, naval architect Harold Cornelius Hanson designed her specifically for biological research work. She had a heavy, wooden, sawn-fir-frame hull sheathed in ironbark and a flush deck with a long forward deck that allowed her crew and embarked scientists to work more easily in Arctic ice. She had a 100-ton cargo storage hold accessible via a hatch in her after deck. She had three separate deck levels, and spacious living space for her crew and embarked scientists was divided among the decks and included sleeping accommodations for 16 people. She carried an 18-foot (5.5-meter) tender – stowed on deck aft of her upper deckhouse when not in use – with a 10-horsepower (8.5-kilowatt) Kermath Marine Engines engine.

The Winslow Marine Railway and Shipbuilding Company built Brown Bear at Bainbridge Island, Washington. Her construction took six months. She was launched at Eagle Harbor, Washington, on 7 November 1934 with a large crowd of guests from Seattle looking on. After fitting out was completed, she was commissioned into servicewith the Bureau of Biological Survey.

== Operational history ==
=== Bureau of Biological Survey and Alaska Game Commission ===
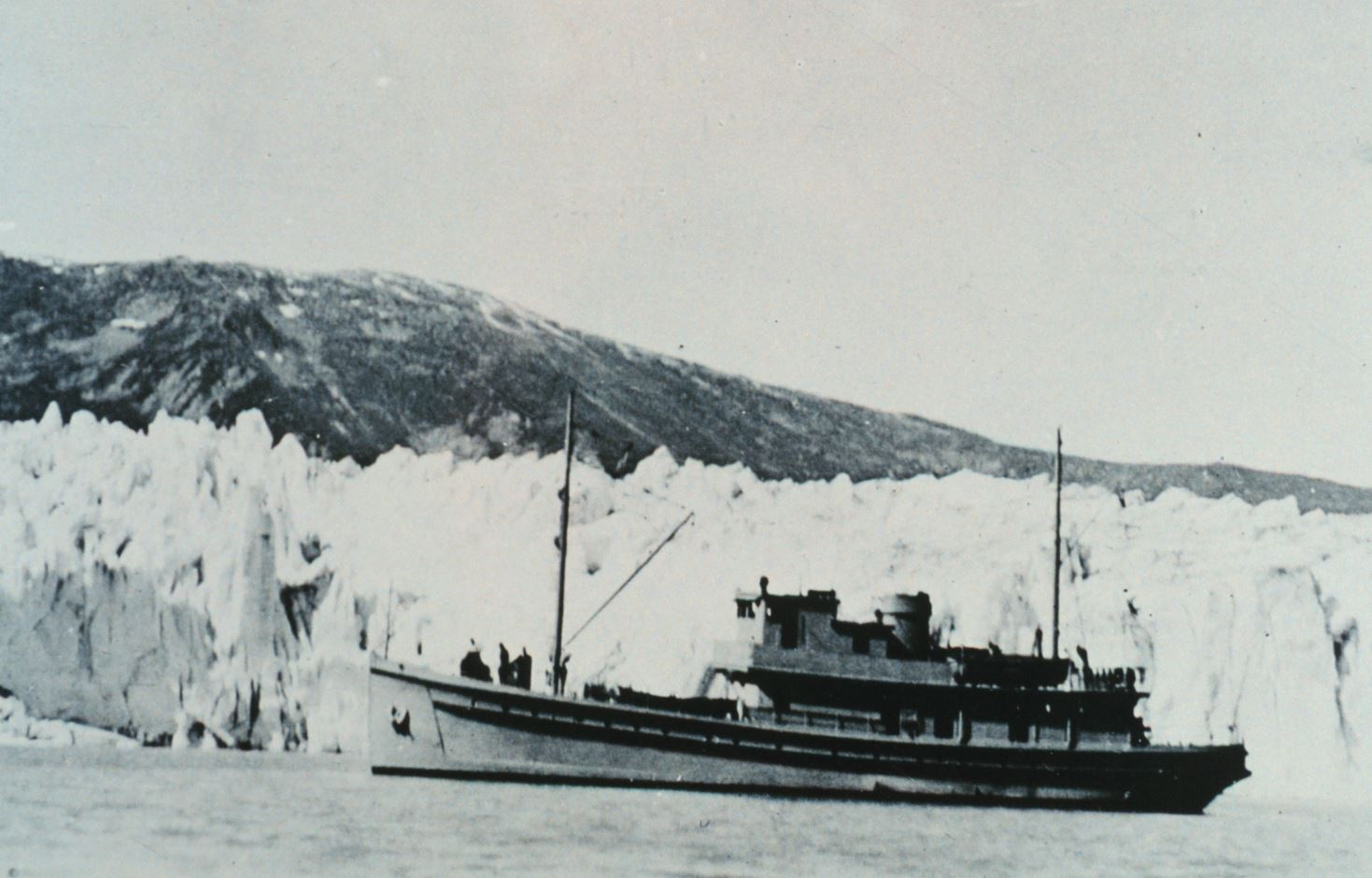
Brown Bear in front of Taku Glacier in the Territory of Alaska in August 1935.

In 1936, Brown Bear made history's first survey of sea otters in and around the Aleutian Islands in the Territory of Alaska. The sea otter herd was of considerable commercial value as a source of furs, and Brown Bear′s survey demonstrated that the sea otters were becoming more numerous and expanding their range, dispelling fears that they were becoming extinct in the Aleutians. Brown Bear also reported sightings of foreign commercial fishing activities in Aleutian waters, something that she did during her other cruises in Alaskan waters as well.

Bureau of Biological Survey biologist Olaus Murie – accompanied by other scientists from both the Bureau and the Alaska Game Commission – used Brown Bear from 1936 to 1938 to study resources native to the Aleutian Islands, Alaska Peninsula, and Bering Sea. In 1939, Brown Bear transported Bureau ichthyologist and University of Michigan Curator of Fishes Dr. Carl L. Hubbs to Unalaska and the Pribilof Islands during an intensive study he made of the Territory of Alaska's fisheries and marine mammals, and in September 1939 the ship conveyed him to Seattle.

=== Fish and Wildlife Service (1940–1941) ===
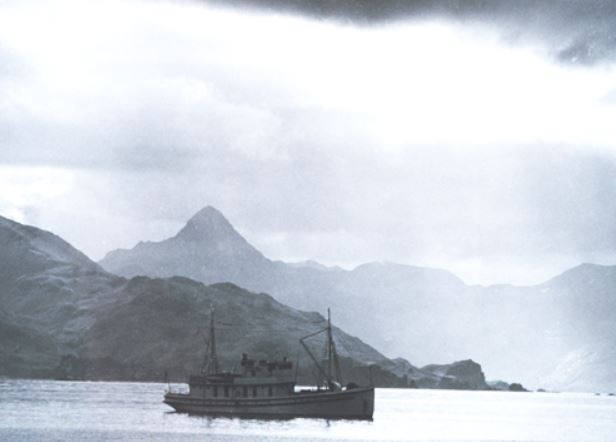
US FWS Brown Bear on 5 August 1941.

In 1939, the Bureau of Biological Survey was transferred from the Department of Agriculture to the United States Department of the Interior, and on 30 June 1940, it merged with the Bureau of Fisheries to form the new Fish and Wildlife Service (FWS) as an element of the Department of the Interior. Via this reorganization, Brown Bear became part of the fleet of the new FWS in 1940 as US FWS Brown Bear.

In 1940, Brown Bear was assigned to protect game in the Aleutian Islands National Wildlife Refuge, and she spent the year patrolling the islands. During 1941, she made trips along the Aleutian Island chain as far as Attu Island at its westernmost end in support of a U.S. Government effort to explore ways of propagating sea otter populations in the Territory of Alaska.

=== U.S. Navy and U.S. Coast Guard ===
At some point in the four weeks after the United States entered World War II on 7 December 1941, Brown Bear was transferred to the United States Navy for war service. The Navy designated her as a yard patrol vessel, renamed her USS YP-197, and transferred her to the United States Coast Guard on 5 January 1942. For her war service, she was equipped with a T-106 radio transmitter, a radio receiver, a boom, and a derrick. The Coast Guard used YP-197 to transport personnel and freight in Puget Sound and the San Juan Islands. After the conclusion of the war, the Coast Guard transferred her to the Navy on 2 November 1945, and on 28 March 1946 the Navy transferred her to the FWS.

=== Fish and Wildlife Service (1946–1951) ===
Returning to her original name as US FWS Brown Bear, the vessel resumed her operations for the FWS. In 1946, she was moored at the FWS pier at the north end of Lake Union in Seattle when a large fire gutted the FWS warehouse at the pier. The fire scorched Brown Bear and she narrowly escaped destruction.

Brown Bear left Seattle on 3 April 1947 carrying FWS personnel to Southeast Alaska, where they worked the downstream pink salmon fry-counting weir at the FWS Little Port Walter field station at Port Walter, Territory of Alaska. After that, she served as a base of operations for the spring 1947 stream surveys headed by FWS biologist Samuel J. Hutchinson, operating skiffs with outboard motors to transport personnel between ship and shore. Upon completion of the survey in early May 1947. Brown Bear transferred the survey staff to the FWS vessel US FWS Brant so that they could conduct additional surveys in Alaska′s Ketchikan district, then departed Alaska to transport Hutchinson to Seattle.

By the end of the 1940s, Brown Bear was making regular supply runs to and from Bristol Bay. Around 1950, the FWS vessel US FWS Dennis Winn relieved her of these duties. For six months in late 1950 and early 1951, Brown Bear operated in severe late autumn, winter, and early spring weather in the Aleutian Islands while her crew and embarked scientists studied an intestinal parasite that was killing sea otters. After completing this cruise, she arrived at Juneau, Alaska, in May 1951.

=== University of Washington ===
The U.S. Navy again requisitioned Brown Bear when she arrived at Juneau in 1951, but by the summer of 1952 the University of Washington's Department of Oceanography had acquired her. The university employed her in research projects in Alaska, off the coasts of Washington and Oregon, and in parts of the Columbia River, and she often operated in cooperation with vessels from other agencies.

In 1956 and 1957, Brown Bear worked with the FWS vessels US FWS Skipjack and US FWS Teal to support a study of the estuarine circulation of water in Silver Bay, a deep-water fjord in Alaska near Sitka. Equipped with 31,000 feet (9,449 m) of wire rope and sampling gear to allow her to make soundings in waters up to 20,000 feet (6,100 m) deep, she made an oceanographic expedition in the summer of 1957 as part of an international project to study the Pacific Ocean, including the Aleutian Trench. In the summer of 1958, she worked with ships from the Scripps Institution of Oceanography and Canada to conduct a longitudinal profile survey of waters as far north as the Bering Strait, including bathymetry, bottom sampling, and chemical and physical studies of the water. In 1959 and 1960, she made cruises to conduct a comprehensive oceanographic study of the Chukchi Sea, cooperating with the Fish and Wildlife Service research vessel US FWS John N. Cobb (FWS 1601); during the 1960 cruise, she also made seabird observations. Between January and August 1965, Brown Bear made four cruises off the coasts of Washington and Oregon during which she collected physical, biological, and chemical data regarding the properties of Columbia River effluent water.

=== U.S. Fish and Wildlife Service (1965–1970) and NOAA ===
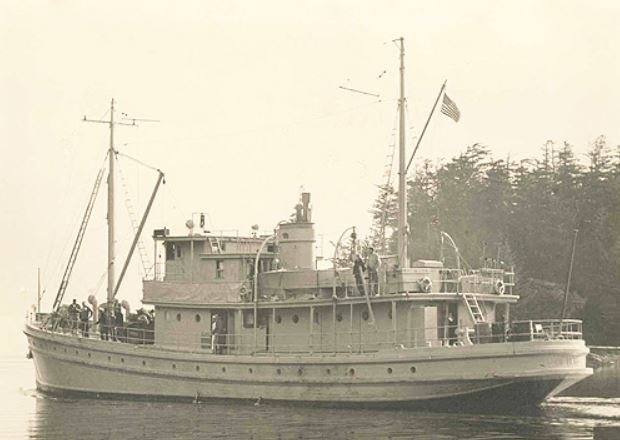
Port-quarter view of Brown Bear.

Around 1965, Brown Bear was returned to the Fish and Wildlife Service, which in 1956 had undergone a reorganization in which it was renamed the United States Fish and Wildlife Service (USFWS) and a new Bureau of Commercial Fisheries (BCF) was created within it; the BCF operated USFWS seagoing ships like Brown Bear, and so upon her return to the USFWS, Brown Bear was assigned to the BCF, again as US FWS Brown Bear.

On 3 October 1970, a major reorganization occurred which formed the National Oceanic and Atmospheric Administration (NOAA) under the United States Department of Commerce. As part of the reorganization, the BCF was abolished and its ships were removed from the USFWS and reassigned to NOAA, and ships of the BCF fleet joined those of the United States Coast and Geodetic Survey in forming the new NOAA fleet. At first, the major ships that were to constitute the new fleet reported to separate entities, with former Coast and Geodetic Survey ships subordinate to the National Ocean Survey (the Coast and Geodetic Survey's successor organization within NOAA), while former BCF ships like Brown Bear reported to the BCF's successor within NOAA, the National Marine Fisheries Service (NMFS). During 1972 and 1973, however, the ships of the National Ocean Survey and NMFS, as well as those of the Environmental Research Laboratories, integrated to form a consolidated and unified NOAA fleet, operated by the National Ocean Survey's Office of Fleet Operations, but NOAA replaced Brown Bear before she could integrate into the unified NOAA fleet.

During these years, Brown Bear operated as a "houseboat" for the USFWS and later NOAA, and hosted saltwater salmon-rearing experiments while stationed at the NOAA Manchester Biological Field Station in Puget Sound near Bremerton, Washington. She served as a floating laboratory and fish hatchery, equipped with tanks and trays for marine sampling. She had very capable facilities for studying water chemistry which allowed the circulation of fresh and salt water and its modification by temperature, filtration, aeration, and ultraviolet germicidal irradiation.

In 1972, NOAA procured a portable floating laboratory to replace Brown Bear. She was decommissioned and sold.

=== Later career ===
By 1990, Brown Bear had been renamed MV Baja Explorador and was operating in Mexico as a commercial excursion vessel and for recreational underwater diving in the waters around Baja California. By 1992 she had been sold to American owners, renamed Brown Bear, and moored at Los Angeles, California. Records suggest that she never put to sea again, except to be moved to San Diego, California, in 1994. In the meantime, she passed through a succession of owners – Michael Brittain of Seward, Alaska, then the Alaska Oceanographic Society, then the Anderson Tug & Barge Company, and eventually R/V Brown Bear Inc. of Seward. In August 1994, she sank from neglect at San Diego, and by 1995 she apparently had broken in half. She eventually was refloated, and sometime in late 1997 or January 1998 she was towed out to sea and scuttled in the Pacific Ocean off San Diego.
