= Vit =

Vit may refer to:

- Vit (river), a river in Bulgaria
- Vit Ice Piedmont (Vit Glacier), a glacier in Antarctica
- de Vit, European surname
- Vít, Czech given name
- vit., short for vitamin
- Vit (album), 2017 album by Christer Fredriksen
- "Vit" (song), a 1994 song by The Future Sound of London
- Vision transformer, a type of artificial neural network

== See also ==
- VIT (disambiguation)
- Vitt (disambiguation)
- Vits (disambiguation)
- Vid (disambiguation)
- Veit (disambiguation)
- Saint-Vit (disambiguation)
