= Vitus Bering (disambiguation) =

Vitus Bering (1681–1741) was a Danish-born Russian explorer.

Vitus Bering may also refer to:

- Vitus Bering (1617–1675), Danish poet, historian and Supreme Court justice
- Vitus Bering (icebreaker), a Russian icebreaker
