= Vidoje =

Vidoje (Cyrillic: Видоје) is a masculine given name of South Slavic origin. It is related to the name Vid, which is the Slavic form of Vitus.

== Notable people with the name ==
- Vidoje Blagojević (born 1950), Bosnian Serb military commander
- Vidoje Jovanović (born 1961), Serbian politician
- Vidoje Petrović (born 1961), Serbian politician
- Vidoje Žarković (1927–2000), Montenegrin politician

== See also ==
- Vidojevica
