= Vits =

Vits may refer to:

== People ==
=== Surname ===
- Ernst Hellmut Vits (1903–1970), German lawyer
- Henry Vits (1842–1921), American businessman and politician
- Mia De Vits (born 1950), Belgian politician

=== Given name ===
- Vīts Rimkus (born 1973), Latvian football player

== Other ==
- Vignan Institute of Technology and Science (VITS)
- vertical interval test signal inserter (VITS inserter)

== See also ==
- Vit (disambiguation)
- Vitus (disambiguation)
