= Environmental Research Institute of Michigan =

Research institute

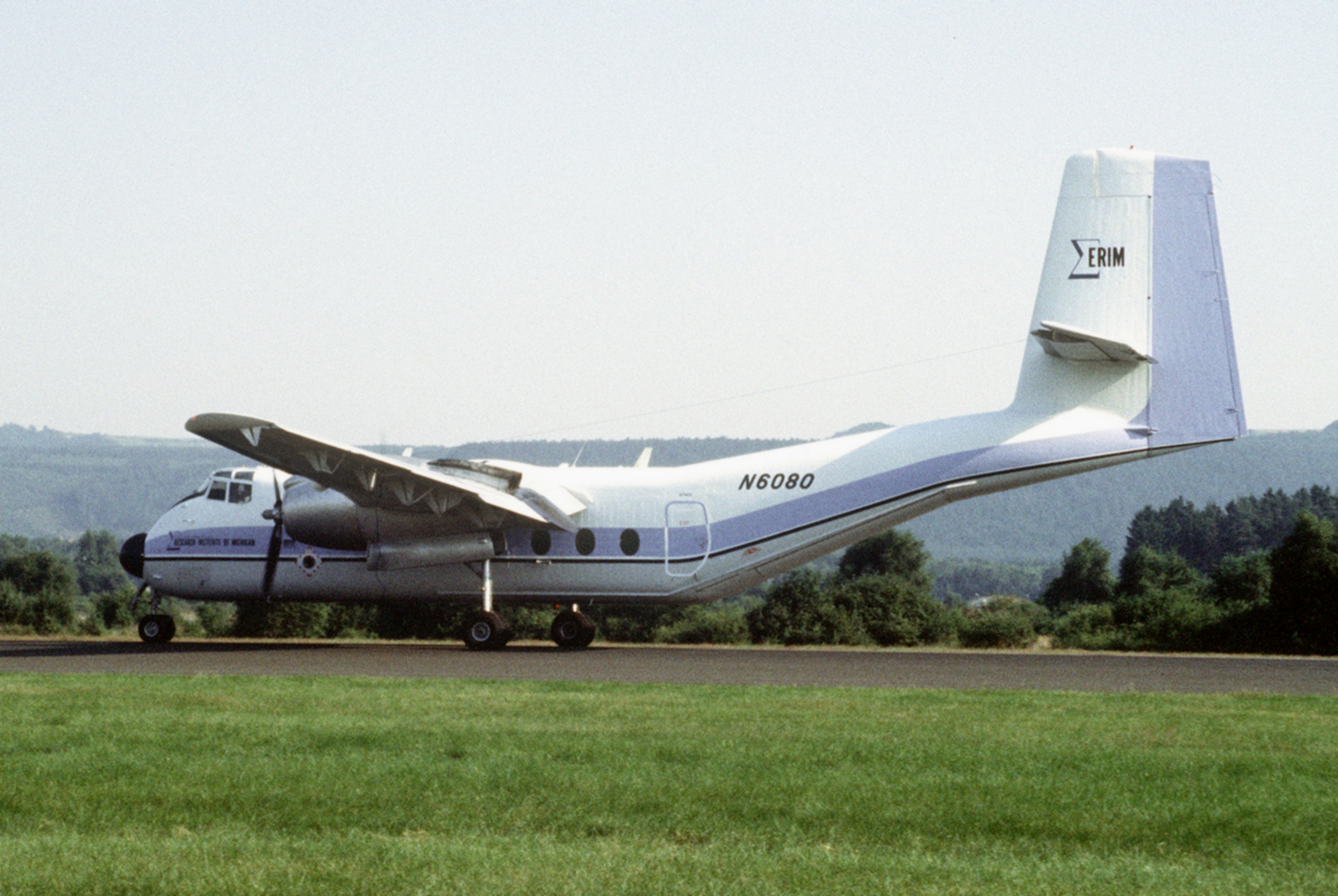
An ERIM DHC-4 at Ramstein Air Base, in 1980.

The Environmental Research Institute of Michigan (ERIM) was a research institute at Ann Arbor, Michigan, founded in 1972. The institute contributed to the development of remote sensing, radar, and holography. ERIM grew out of a military and environmental research arm of the University of Michigan, the Michigan Aeronautical Research Center, later known as the Willow Run Research Center.

A for-profit enterprise, ERIM International, split off from it in 1997. This was successively acquired by Veridian Corporation, by General Dynamics—moving to Ypsilanti—and in 2014 by MacDonald, Dettwiler and Associates (MDA). Meanwhile, the remaining non-profit portion became the Altarum Institute in 2001. Part of Altarum was in 2006 merged into the Michigan Tech Research Institute (MTRI), conducting environmental and remote sensing research, while health systems research continues at Altarum Institute.

== History ==
The Environmental Research Institute of Michigan (ERIM) began as Willow Run Laboratories in 1946, but was established as a private not for profit research institute when it formally separated from the University of Michigan in 1972. ERIM contributed to the development of remote sensing for environmental and military applications. Much of the laboratory's early history is not publicized because ERIM and its predecessor organizations were developing remote sensing and surveillance systems to collect military intelligence from aircraft and satellites.

== Willow Run Laboratories ==
Prior to Willow Run Laboratories's establishment in 1946, with the Cold War just beginning, the War Department was concerned about keeping the U.S. in the forefront of applied science. University researchers newly returned from WWII service were anxious to use their expertise to address those concerns.

At the University of Michigan's College of Engineering, Professors William Gould Dow and Emerson W. Conlon approached Wright-Patterson Air Force Base scientists with their proposal to conduct a large-scale research project. The project was designed to prove the feasibility of what would later be referred to as an antiballistic missile system. The proposal was accepted, called WIZARD, and it was this contract that gave birth to ERIM's first predecessor organization, the Michigan Aeronautical Research Center (MARC).

During the Vietnam War, protesters at the University of Michigan forced the university to sever formal ties with Willow Run Laboratories. Research from ERIM provided technology for military surveillance, as well as information and models for better prediction and understanding of floods, fires, agricultural crops and remotely sensed information, including studies of the Bering Glacier.

== Key technologies ==
ERIM became well known in the scientific community through a series of international conferences on remote sensing and geospatial information technologies, in the spirit of the first International Symposium on Remote Sensing of the Environment held in Ann Arbor, Michigan in 1962.

ERIM played key-roles in the development and implementation of synthetic aperture radar (SAR), at the time, an entirely new concept of radar technology. Development of an optical processing system for SAR data led Emmett Leith, Adam Kozma and Juris Upatnieks to use the newly invented laser in conjunction with the holographic theories outlined by Dennis Gabor. Leith and Upatnieks developed a practical technique for wave-front recording and reconstruction using lasers, thereby making possible the field now known as holography. Holograms have since found a wide variety of applications.

== Corporate history ==
In 1997, claiming an inability to compete with for-profit industry, President Peter Banks and ERIM's board of trustees spun off a for-profit subsidiary under the name ERIM International, Incorporated. Nearly all of ERIM's R&D work and contracts moved to the for-profit entity, while the buildings, property, and a small fraction of personnel and contracts were retained by the not-for-profit ERIM. Banks and many board members allotted themselves high numbers of shares in the new for-profit venture, which were exercised for considerable sums when ERIM International, Inc. was sold to Veridian Corp. of Washington, D.C. in 1999. Veridian was later bought by General Dynamics Advanced Information Systems in 2003, and the heritage-ERIM part of the organization became its Michigan Research and Development Center (MRDC) and moved from Ann Arbor to nearby Ypsilanti. Proceeds from the sale of ERIM International were used by the not-for-profit ERIM to acquire Center for Electronic Commerce (CEC), another Ann Arbor not for profit in 1998. ERIM acquired Vector Research, Inc. (VRI) in 2001 to form the Altarum Institute, headquartered in Ann Arbor, Michigan.

On October 1, 2006, Michigan Technological University purchased the Altarum Institute's Environmental and Emerging Technologies Division (EETD), which was mostly comprised by the heritage-ERIM portion of the institute, to form the Michigan Tech Research Institute (MTRI). The Altarum Institute is a nonprofit now solely focused on health systems research, while the environmental and remote sensing research continues at MTRI.

On October 3, 2014, MacDonald, Dettwiler and Associates (MDA), Canadian corporation, completed the acquisition of the Ypsilanti, Michigan building and employees therein from General Dynamics Advanced Information Systems. With MDA's corporate restructuring following the acquisition of Digital Globe in 2017, this line of business was shifted into the newly formed subsidiary Radiant Solutions . Following MDA's restructuring, the company was renamed to Maxar Technologies, and the Ypsilanti site was placed under its RST division. On November 2024, ARKA Group completed acquisition of the RST section of Maxar. In 2026, CACI acquired ARKA for $2.6 billion.

== See also ==
- Remote Sensing
- University of Michigan
- Michigan Technological University
