= Vitty =

Vitty is a surname. Notable people with the surname include:

- Denny Vitty (born 1949), Northern Ireland politician
- David Vitty (born 1974), also known as "Comedy Dave" from BBC Radio 1's The Chris Moyles Show
- Jack Vitty (1923–2021), English footballer

== See also ==
- Vitt (surname)
