= Åbenrå 26 =

18th-century building in Copenhagen

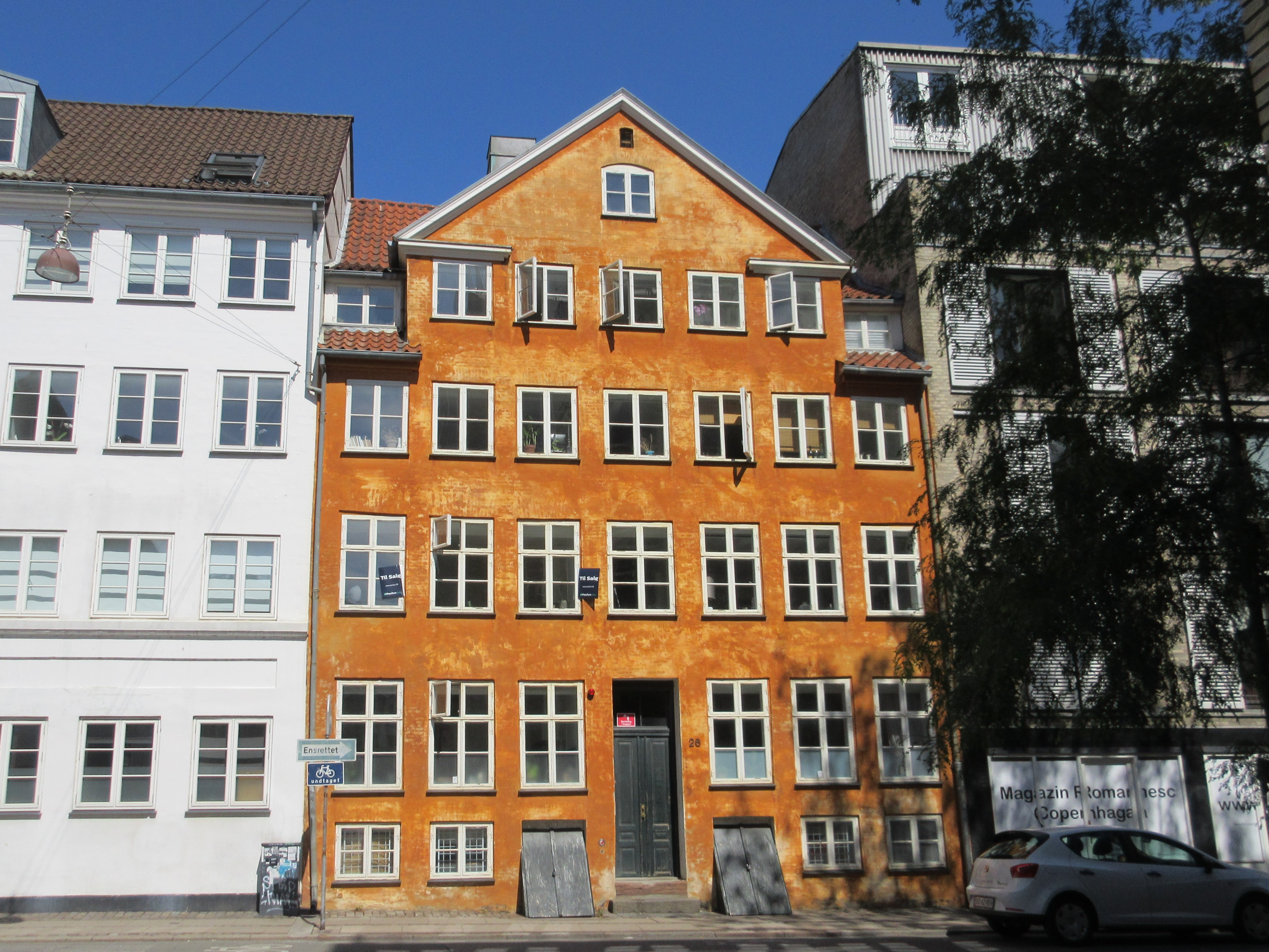
- Interactive map of the Åbenrå 26 area

General information
- Location: Copenhagen, Denmark
- Coordinates: 55°40′59.99″N 12°34′34.57″E
- Completed: 1756

Åbenrå 26 is an 18th-century property situated at Åbenrå 26 in the Old Town of Copenhagen, Denmark. It was listed in the Danish registry of protected buildings and places in 1964.

== History ==
=== 17th century ===
The property was listed in Copenhagen's first cadastre of 1689 as No. 227 in Rosenborg Quarter, owned by Mads, stonecutter (stenhugger). It was listed in the new cadastre of 1756 as No. 237 and was owned by Lars Christensen at that time.

The present building on the site was built in 1756 by carpenter Palle Thomsen.

=== 19th century ===
The property was listed in the new cadastre of 1806 as No. 245. It was owned by beer seller (øltapper) Hans Hansen.

=== 20th century ===
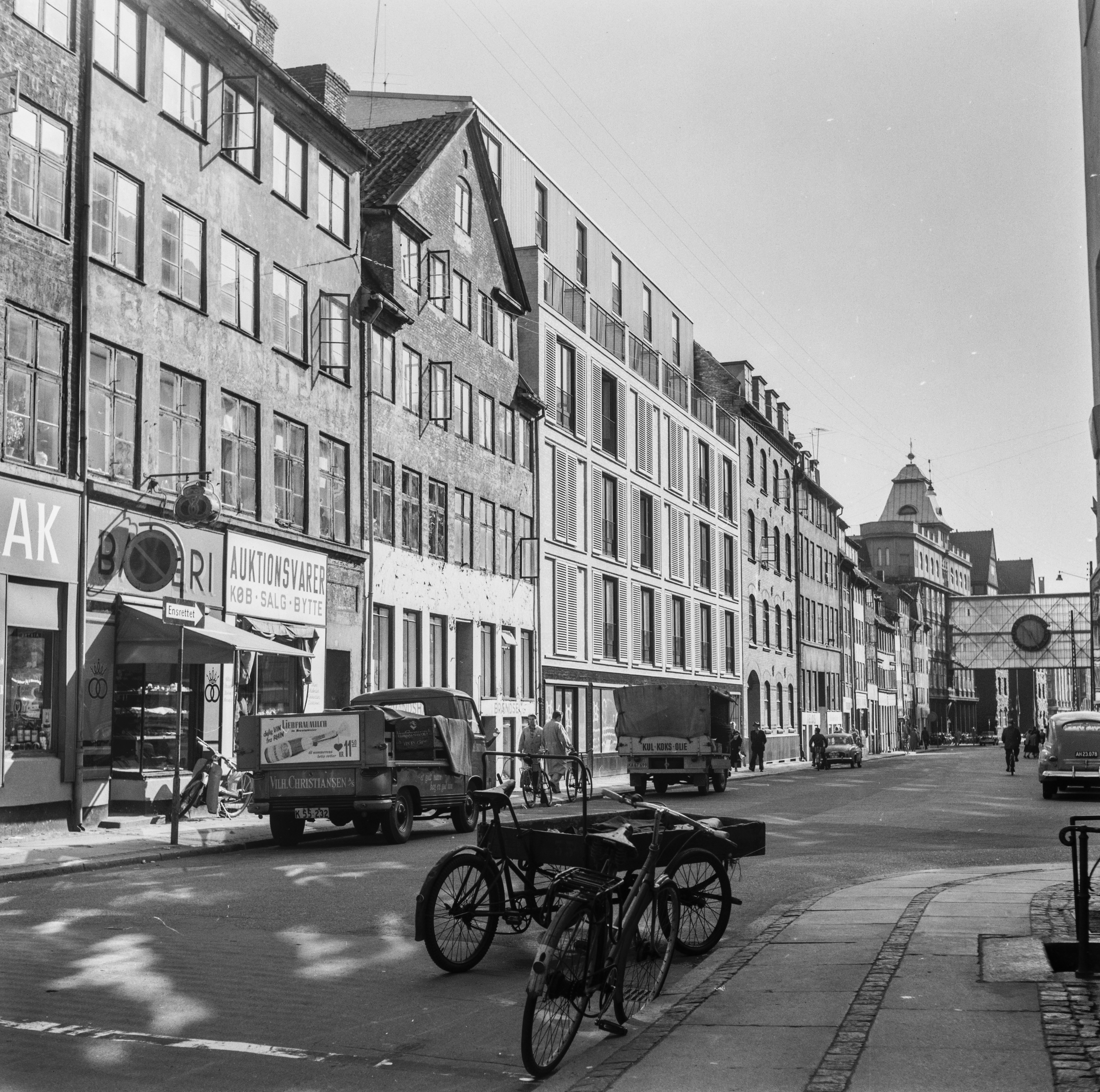
The building viewed to the left in 1961

No. 26 and the adjacent property at No. 28–30 were in the 1960s owned by the University of Copenhagen. In September 1971, it was squatted by 30 members of the Redstockings Movement. No. 26 was subsequently converted into a women's house while No. 28-30 was used as housing for women. The buildings were next year acquired by the Ministry of Culture with the intention of later using it for an extension of the Museum of Musical History at No. 32–34. The Redstockings were given a temporary rent-free lease on the property. In spring 1975, the Redstockings' lease was terminated with effect from 15 February 1976. Their activities were moved to the former Kofoed's School on Prinsessegade in Christianshavn. Åbenrå 27 was together with No. 28-30 then taken over by the Museum of Musical History. The museum moved out of the premises in 2014.

== Architecture ==
The building consists of three storeys over a raised cellar and is topped by a roof with a five-bay wall dormer. The rear side of the building is constructed with exposed timber framing. The building was listed in the Danish registry of protected buildings and places in 1964.
