= Vitt (disambiguation) =

Vitt or VITT may refer to:

- Vitt, a village in Germany on the Baltic Sea island of Ruegen
- William T. Vitt House (Vitt House), Washington, Franklin County, Missouri, USA; an NRHP-listed building
- Vitt (surname)
- Vaccine-induced immune thrombotic thrombocytopenia

== See also ==
- VIT (disambiguation)
