= William Gould Dow =

American scientist and inventor

- Born: September 30, 1895; Faribault, Minnesota, U.S.
- Died: October 17, 1999 (aged 104); Bellevue, Washington, U.S.
- Education: University of Minnesota; University of Michigan
- Awards: IEEE James H. Mulligan, Jr. Education Medal (1963)
- Scientific career
- Fields: electrical engineering, space research, computer engineering, nuclear engineering
- Workplaces: University of Michigan; Environmental Research Institute of Michigan

William Gould Dow (September 30, 1895 – October 17, 1999) was an American scientist, educator and inventor. He was a pioneer in a variety of fields, including electrical engineering, space research, computer engineering, and nuclear engineering. He helped develop life-saving radar jamming technology during World War II, and was a long-time professor at the University of Michigan.

== Biography ==
=== Early life ===
Dow was born on September 30, 1895, in Faribault, Minnesota, to Dr. James J. Dow and the former Myra Brown, who had had the distinction of being the first two students to graduate from Carleton College just months before their marriage in 1874. He was the great-great-grandson of American Revolutionary War veteran Corporal Silas Gould.

He attended the University of Minnesota, obtaining his BS in 1916 and his BSE in EE in 1917. During World War I, Dow was a lieutenant in the US Army Corps of Engineers, with stints at Camp A.A. Humphreys, Virginia (now Fort Belvoir) and the National Bureau of Standards. Upon leaving the Army in 1919, he took on a variety of sales and marketing positions, mainly selling electrical equipment for the Westinghouse Electric Corporation.

=== Academia ===
In 1924, Dow married Edna Lois Sontag, and two years later he joined the faculty of the University of Michigan as an instructor in electrical engineering. He obtained his MS from Michigan in 1927. While on the faculty, he wrote what would become a classic textbook in the field, Fundamentals of Engineering Electronics, published in 1937. He was made an associate professor in 1938.

Dow obtained a contract from General Motors' Fisher Body division to develop new induction welding technologies that used higher frequency current than previous methods. Because of the skin effect of alternating current moving through a conductor, higher frequencies meant more of the current (and thus the heat required for welding) was contained in the very upper layers of the material to be welded, rather than being wasted by being distributed deeper inside. The patent Dow obtained for his method contemplates frequencies of up to 3 MHz of alternating current. Although originally intended for use in automobile manufacturing, when the US entered World War II, GM instead put his technology into production manufacturing airplanes.

In 1942, following the end of his GM contract, Dow went to work directly in support of the war effort at the Harvard Radio Research Laboratory, directed by Frederick Emmons Terman. The laboratory was dedicated to finding effective radar countermeasures, including both jamming of enemy radar signals and determining the location of enemy radar installations. His work took him to London, where he narrowly avoided a V-2 rocket attack; the V-2 would eventually play a large role in his post-war research. The radar-jamming countermeasures Dow worked on were nearly 100% effective, and were credited with saving the lives of many Allied pilots.

After returning to the University of Michigan in 1945, Dow was made a full professor. Using the connections he had made during the war, Dow began trying to bring military and government contracts to the university. In January 1946, at a conference on telemetry, he learned that the Army and Navy had begun a joint research program involving captured V-2 rockets. He arranged to attend the second meeting of the V-2 Upper Atmosphere Research Panel (later the Rocket and Satellite Research Panel or simply Rocket Research Panel), and would remain a member of the panel until it ceased operation in 1960. Other influential contributors to space research were part of the panel including James Van Allen and, later, the father of the V-2 rocket, Wernher von Braun.

The panel required all of its members to be actively engaged in relevant research, and as his first experiment, Dow chose to measure ion and electron temperatures in the ionosphere, under contract to the Air Force. The payload consisted of a vacuum tube and a Langmuir probe, but the launch (on August 22, 1946, at White Sands Missile Range) was unsuccessful, with the V-2 crashing only a quarter-mile away from the launch site. The experiment was successfully launched in November of the same year. Another early experiment provided increased accuracy for estimates of the neutral density of the atmosphere, which is a critical factor in the computation of atmospheric drag, and which was thus important to determine accurately before spacecraft could be designed to successfully stand the rigors of atmospheric re-entry.

During this same period of time, Dow helped start a number of various research laboratories at the university, including the Physics Research Lab, the Space Physics Research Lab, the Plasma Engineering Lab, and the Michigan Aeronautical Research Center (which would eventually become the Willow Run Research Center and eventually the Environmental Research Institute of Michigan, or ERIM).

In 1958, Dow was named Chairman of the Department of Electrical Engineering and Computer Science, a position he would hold until 1964, when he retired from teaching. His wife Edna had died in 1963. After retiring from active teaching, he served part-time as a Senior Research Geophysicist in the Space Physics Research Lab until 1971. Dow remarried in 1968, to Katherine "Kitty" Keene, who also died in 1997.

When ERIM split off from the University of Michigan in 1972, Dow became a member of its board of trustees. He left the board in 1990, but remained a Trustee Emeritus. During this time, Dow continued his research, now in the field of fusion power, with several more patents to his credit.

=== Later years ===
Dow remained active late in life, despite failing hearing. He continued to go into his two offices four days a week even after his 100th birthday, a milestone which the EECS Department commemorated by hosting a two-day birthday celebration for his friends and colleagues from around the country. Finally, at the age of 102, after the death of his second wife, he left Michigan to split time between his sons' homes in Texas and Washington.

William Dow died on October 17, 1999, aged 104, in Bellevue, Washington, while residing with his son Daniel, who himself had been Chairman of the Department of Electrical Engineering at the University of Washington in Seattle for a period of time starting in 1968.

== Commemoration ==
- In 1980, the University of Colorado awarded him an honorary Doctorate.
- In 2001, the University of Michigan Department of Electrical Engineering and Computer Science established the William Gould Dow Distinguished Lectureship, the highest external honor the department bestows. It is awarded on the basis of "lifetime achievements, groundbreaking contributions to their fields, and sustained research excellence." In addition to presenting a lecture at the university, recipients receive a $5,000 honorarium.

== Books ==
- Dow, William Gould (1937). Fundamentals of Engineering Electronics. Chapman & Hall.

== Articles ==
- Early, H. C.; Dow, W. (July 1950). "Supersonic Wind at Low Pressures Produced by Arc in Magnetic Field". Physical Review. 79 (1): 186. Bibcode:1950PhRv...79..186E. doi:10.1103/PhysRev.79.186.

== Patents ==
- U.S. patent 2,400,921: Welding Method (assigned to General Motors)
- U.S. patent 2,491,169: Large Throat Portable Welder (assigned to General Motors)
- U.S. patent 2,493,950: High-Frequency Inductive Welding Apparatus (assigned to General Motors)
- U.S. patent 2,556,685: Small Throat Portable Welder (assigned to General Motors)
- U.S. patent 3,501,376: Method and Apparatus for Producing Nuclear Fusion (assigned to Consumers Power Company)
- U.S. patent 4,347,621: Trochoidal nuclear fusion reactor (assigned to Environmental Institute of Michigan)
- U.S. patent 4,244,782: Nuclear fusion system (assigned to Environmental Research Institute of Michigan)
