= Vitus =

Vitus is a Latin given name meaning lively and may refer to:

== People ==
=== Given name ===
- Saint Vitus (c. 290–c. 303), Christian martyr
- Vitus of Hungary (died 1297), beatified friar
- Vitus of Kotor (c. 1275–after 1335), Serbian architect
- Vitus Amerbach (1503–1557), German theologian, scholar and humanist
- Vitus Ashaba (1943–1985), Ugandan middle-distance runner
- Vitus Bering (1617–1675), Danish poet and historian
- Vitus Bering (1681–1741), Danish-born Russian navigator
- Vitus Eicher (born 1990), German football player
- Vitus Georg Tönnemann (1659–1740), German cleric
- Vitus Graber (1844–1892), Austrian entomologist
- Vitus Huonder (born 1942), Swiss prelate
- Vitus Husek (born 1973), German canoeist
- Vitus Miletus (1549–1615), German theologian
- Vitus Nagorny (born 1978), Kyrgyzstan-born German footballer
- Vitus Pichler (1670–1736), Austrian cleric and writer
- Vitus Piluzzi (died 1704), Italian prelate
- V Spehar (born 1982), American journalist

=== Surname ===
- Domenico Vitus (c. 1536–?), Italian engraver
- Maksim Vitus (born 1989), Belarusian footballer

== Other uses ==
- Vitus (bicycles), a French bicycle manufacturer
- Vitus (film), a 2006 Swiss film
- Weihenstephaner Vitus, a German weizenbock beer
- Vitus baronets, a 17th century English title
- Vitus Lake, a lake in Alaska

== See also ==
- Vitis (disambiguation)
- Vito (given name), Italian form of Vitus
- Veit (given name), German form of Vitus
- Vid (given name), Slavic form of vitus
