= Seal River (Bering Glacier) =

River in Alaska, the United States of America

- Location of the mouth of the Seal River in Alaska

Location
- Country: United States
- State: Alaska
- District: Yakutat

Physical characteristics
- Source: Vitus Lake
  - coordinates: 60°04′25″N 143°27′35″W
  - elevation: 8 m (26 ft)
- Mouth: Gulf of Alaska
  - coordinates: 60°02′27″N 143°30′40″W
  - elevation: 0 m (0 ft)

Basin features
- River system: Pacific Ocean drainage basin

The Seal River is a river in the borough of Yakutat in Alaska, United States. It is part of the Pacific Ocean drainage basin, and is a tributary of the Gulf of Alaska.

The river begins at Vitus Lake, which takes in meltwater from the mouth of the Bering Glacier, and flows southwest to the Gulf of Alaska.

== See also ==
- List of rivers of Alaska
