= Bering Glacier =

Glacier in Alaska, United States

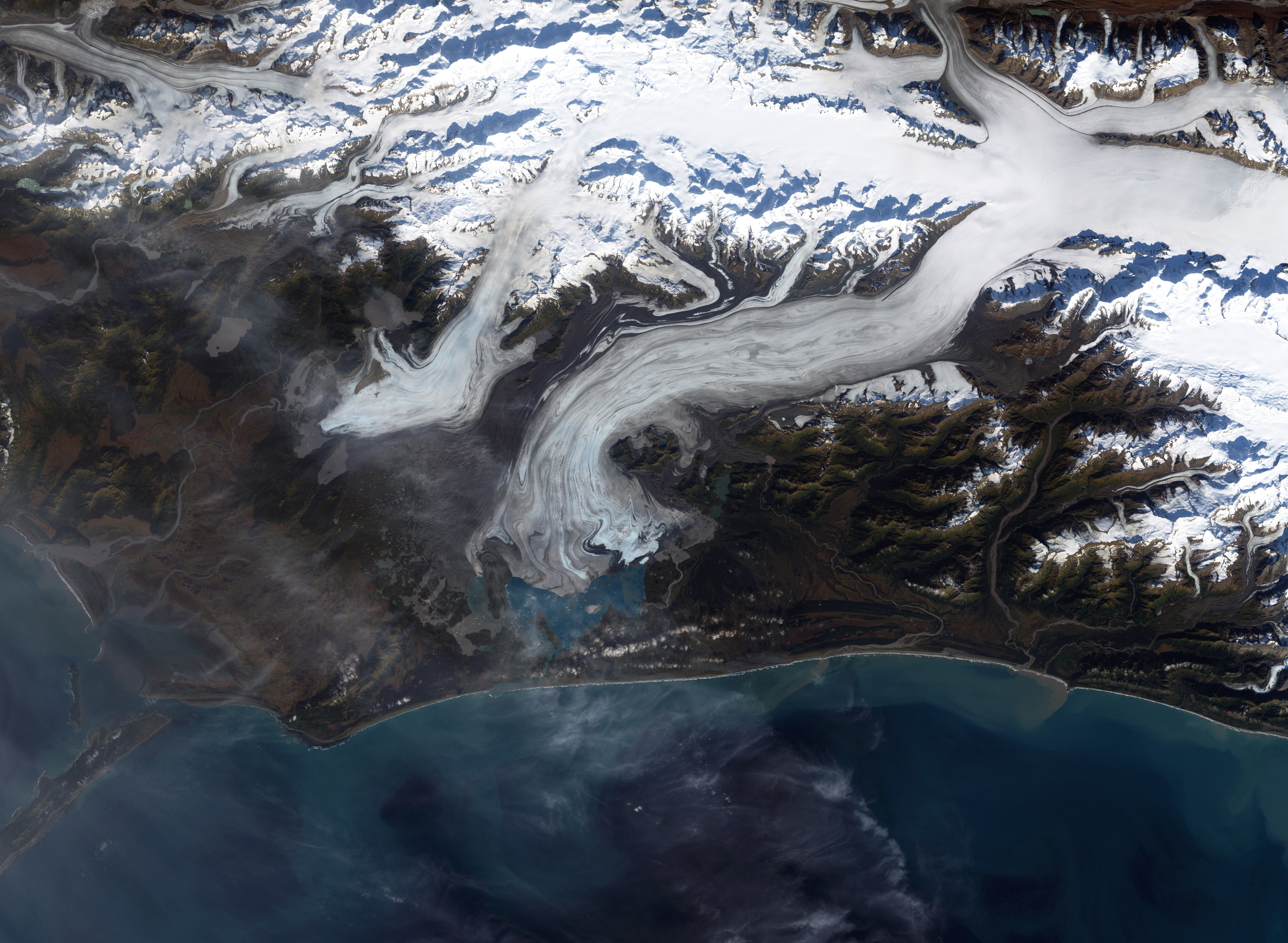
- Terminus of Bering Glacier, September 29, 2002

- Location within Alaska
- Interactive map of Bering Glacier
- Type: glacier
- Coordinates: 60°18′08″N 143°25′11″W
- Terminus: Vitus Lake south of Alaska’s Wrangell-St. Elias National Park
- Status: Retreating

Bering Glacier is a glacier in the U.S. state of Alaska. It currently terminates in Vitus Lake south of Alaska's Wrangell-St. Elias National Park, about 10 km (6.2 mi) from the Gulf of Alaska. Combined with the Bagley Icefield, where the snow that feeds the glacier accumulates, the Bering is the largest glacier in North America. The glacier is named after Vitus Bering.

== Glacier retreat and earthquakes ==
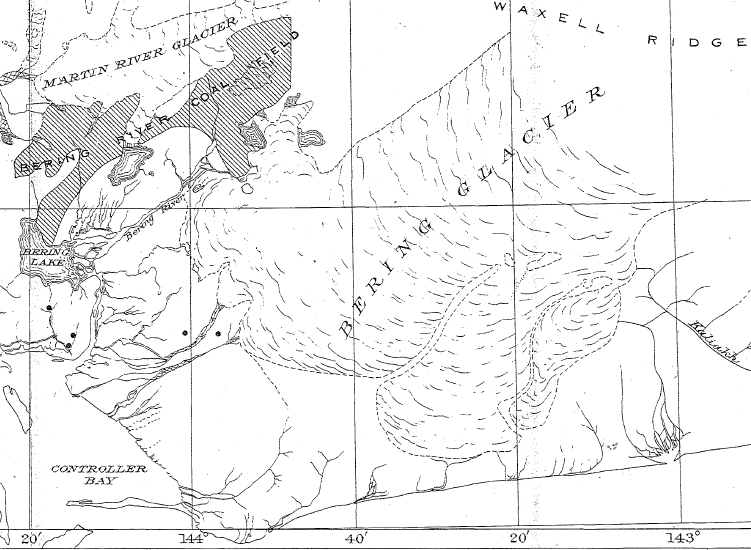
1917 USGS map depicting the extent of the Bering Glacier

Warmer temperatures and changes in precipitation over the past century have thinned the Bering Glacier by several thousand meters. Since 1900 the terminus has retreated as much as 12 km (7.5 mi). The Bering Glacier exhibits "surges", acceleration events of the flow rate of the glacier, every 20 years or so. During these periods the glacier terminus advances. The surges are generally followed by periods of retreat, so despite the periodic advances the glacier has been shrinking overall. The last recorded surge of the Bering Glacier occurred in the winter of 1994-95, with advancement speeds of up to 300 cubic feet a day.Despite the occasional surges, most glaciers along the Alaskan coast have been retreating along with the Bering Glacier.

The glacial retreat has an interesting side effect, an increase in the frequency of earthquakes in the region through a phenomenon known as glacial isostatic adjustment. The Wrangell and Saint Elias mountain ranges that spawn the Bering Glacier were created by the collision of the Pacific and North American tectonic plates (the Pacific Plate is being subducted underneath the North American Plate). The weight of the vast amount of ice in the Bering Glacier is enough to depress the Earth's crust, stabilizing the boundary between the two plates. As the glaciers lose mass, the pressure of the ice is diminished. This reduced compression allows the rocks along faults to move more freely, resulting in more earthquakes.

Scientists from the Michigan Tech Research Institute, working with U.S. Geological Survey and U.S. Bureau of Land Management, have recently discovered that the glacier is releasing approximately 30 cubic kilometres (7.2 cu mi) of water a year, more than twice the amount of water in the entire Colorado River.

Meltwater at the terminus collects in Vitus Lake, which flows via the Seal River to the Gulf of Alaska. As the glacier retreats, higher rates of meltwater contribute to freshwater draining from Vitus Lake into the nearby Pacific Ocean. Scientists are currently monitoring this freshwater flow to determine potential effects on ocean currents in the gulf of Alaska.

== See also ==
- List of glaciers
- Retreat of glaciers since 1850
