= Åbenrå (street) =

Street in Copenhagen, Denmark

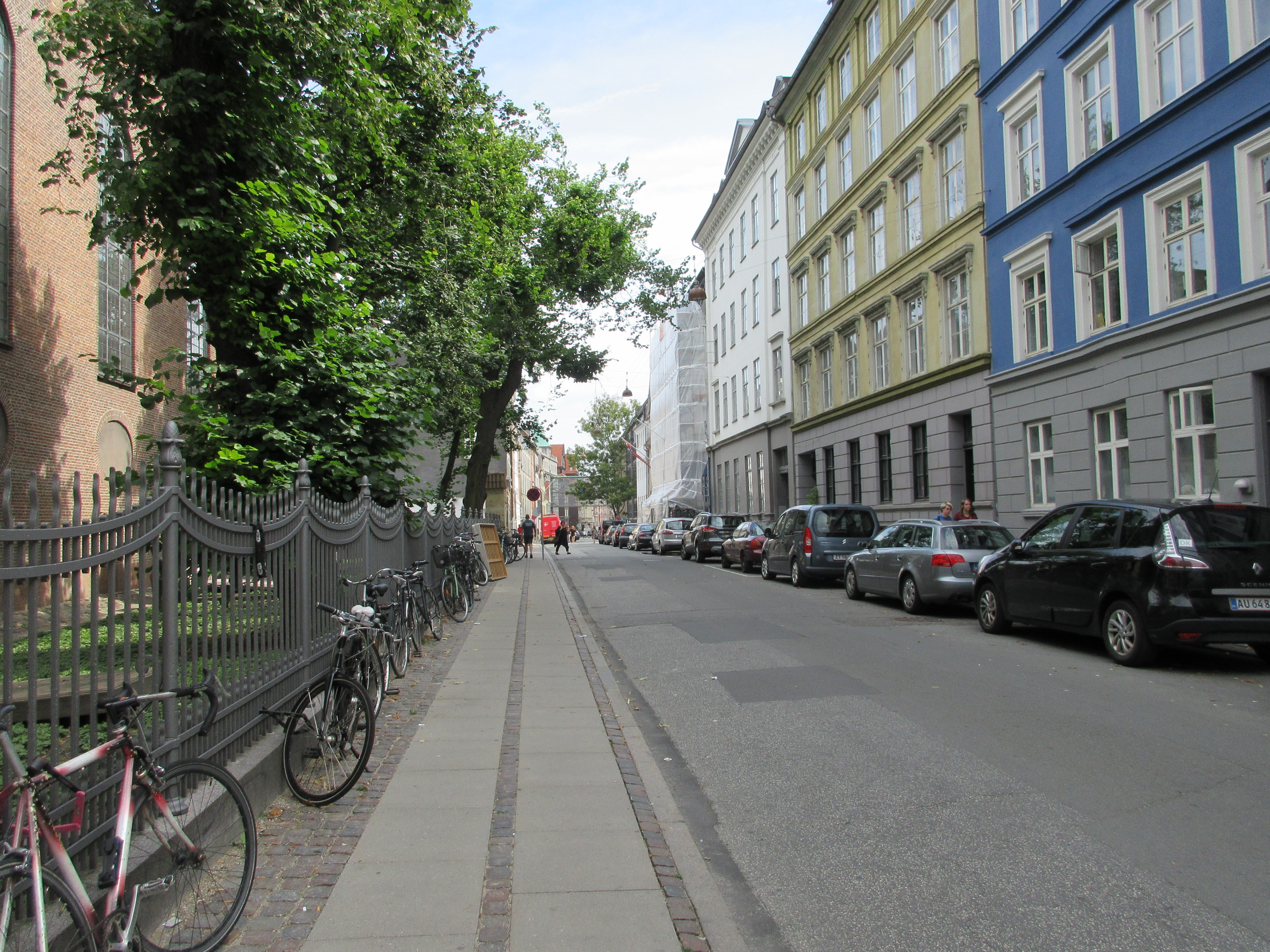
- A view down Åbenrå from the northern end of the street
- Interactive map of Åbenrå
- Length: 223 m (732 ft)
- Location: Indre By, Copenhagen, Denmark
- Postal code: 1124
- Nearest metro station: Nørreport
- Coordinates: 55°40′58.8″N 12°34′37.2″E

Åbenrå is a street in the Old Town of Copenhagen, Denmark. It runs from Landemærket in the southeast to Rosenborggade in the northwest, linking Vognmagergade with Tornebuskgade. The last part of the street passes the rear side of the grounds of the Reformed Church in Gothersgade. The former rectory associated with the church is located at No. 32-36. It is now houses the Danish Association of Architects.

== History ==
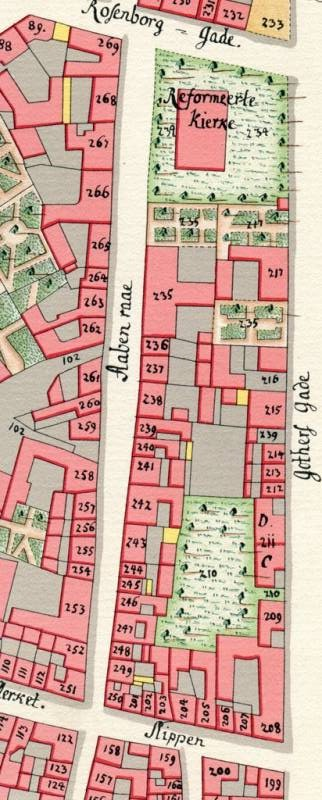
Åbenrå seen on Gedde's district map

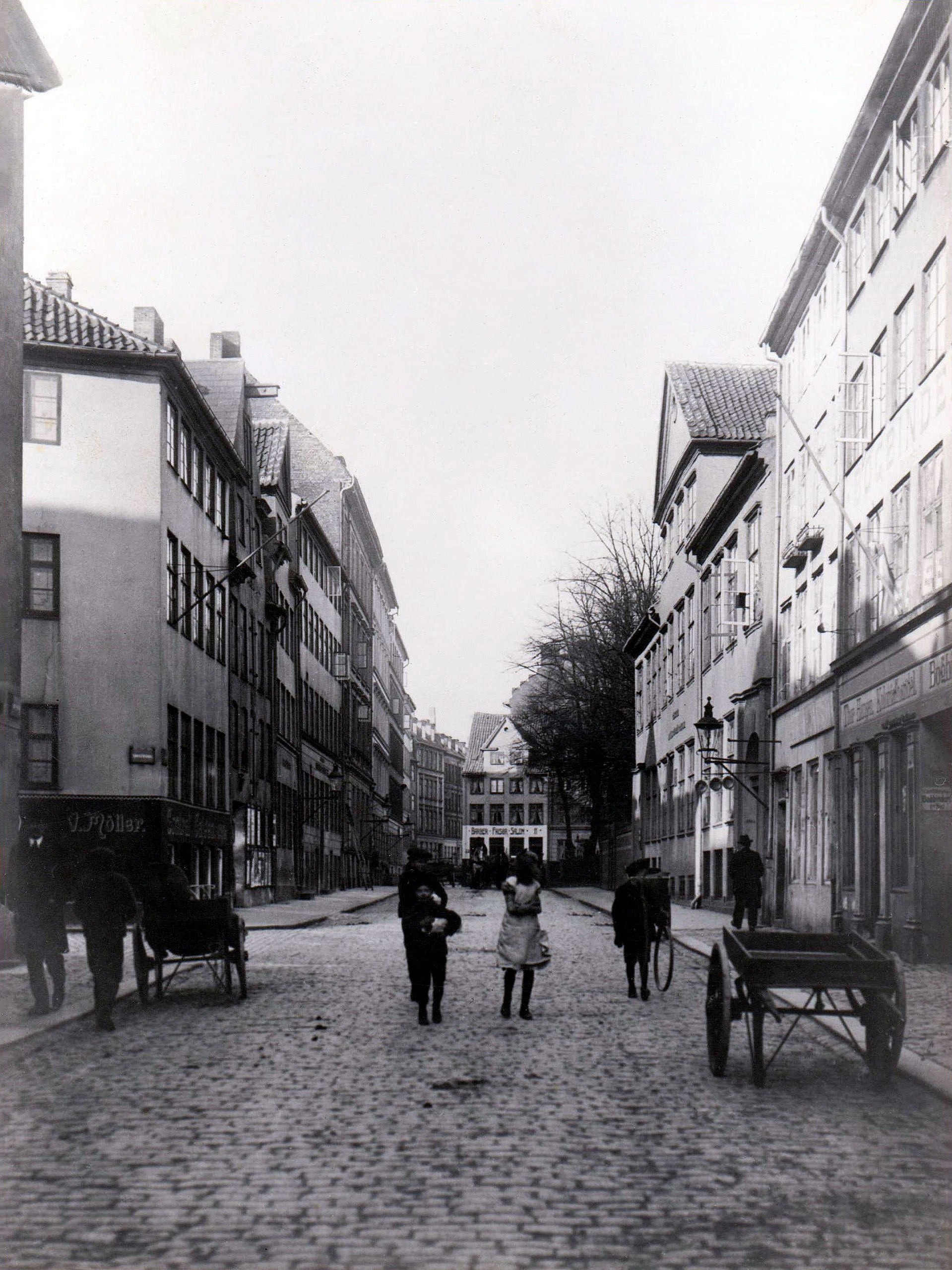
The street in 1913

The street originally followed Copenhagen's East Rampart in an area of the city, north of Landemærket, which long remained relatively undeveloped. It is believed that the street was originally called "Åbne Vråer", a reference to a row of open market stalls that sold woollen goods at the site. This name was gradually corrupted into its current name and it is thus unrelated to the name of the town Aabenraa in South Jutland.

The street was destroyed in the Copenhagen Fire of 1728 but was not part of the area that was destroyed in the Fire of 1795. Several buildings along the street were demolished in the 1950s.

== Notable buildings and structures ==
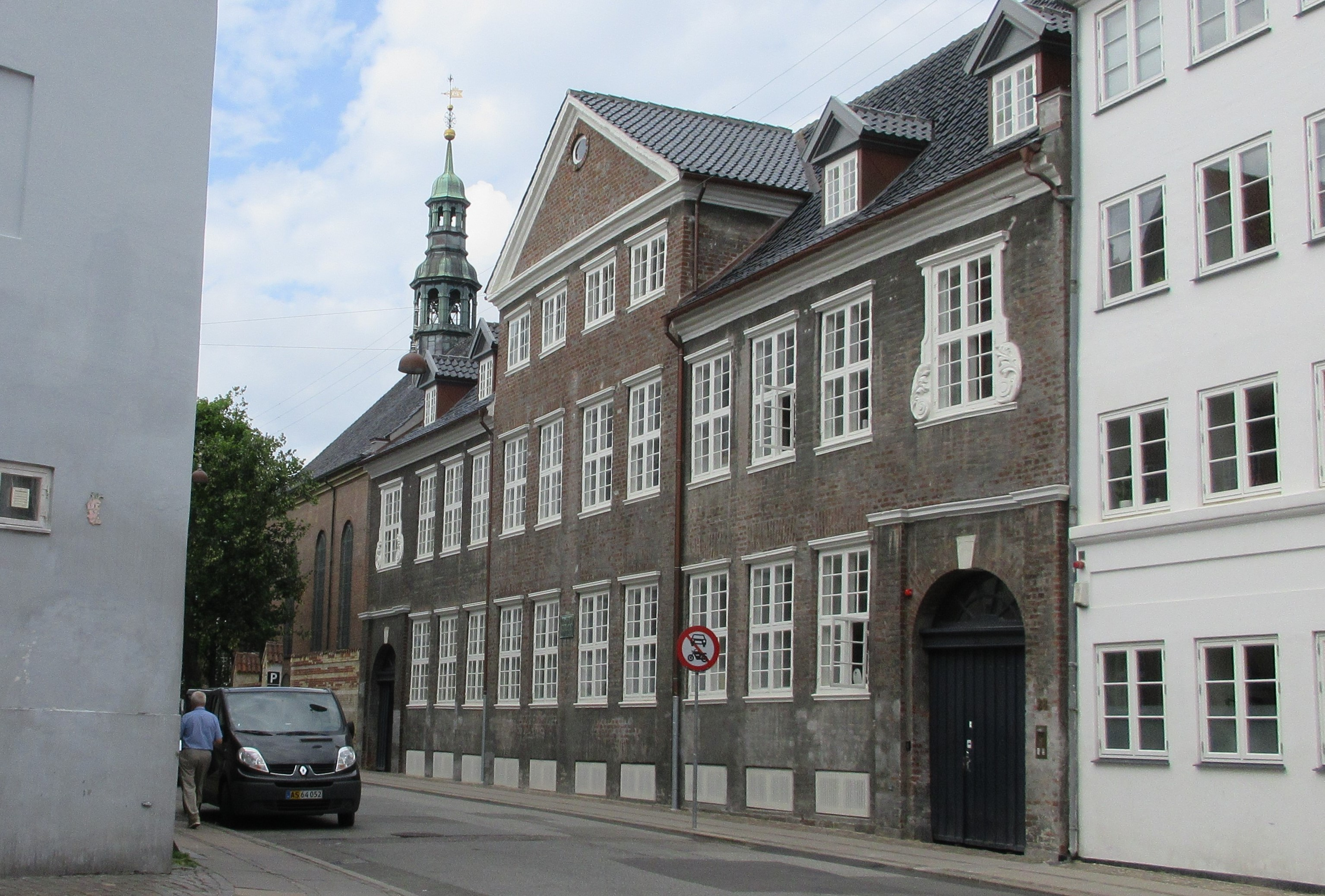
The former rectory of Reformed Church

No. 32-36 is the former rectory associated with the Reformed Church in Gothersgade on the other side of the block. The building was built in 1730–32 to design by Philip de Lange. It is now owned by Karberghus and houses the Danish Association of Architects. Rosenborghus at No. 29 served as school and orphanage for children from the German Reformed congregation for the 1770s until 1926.

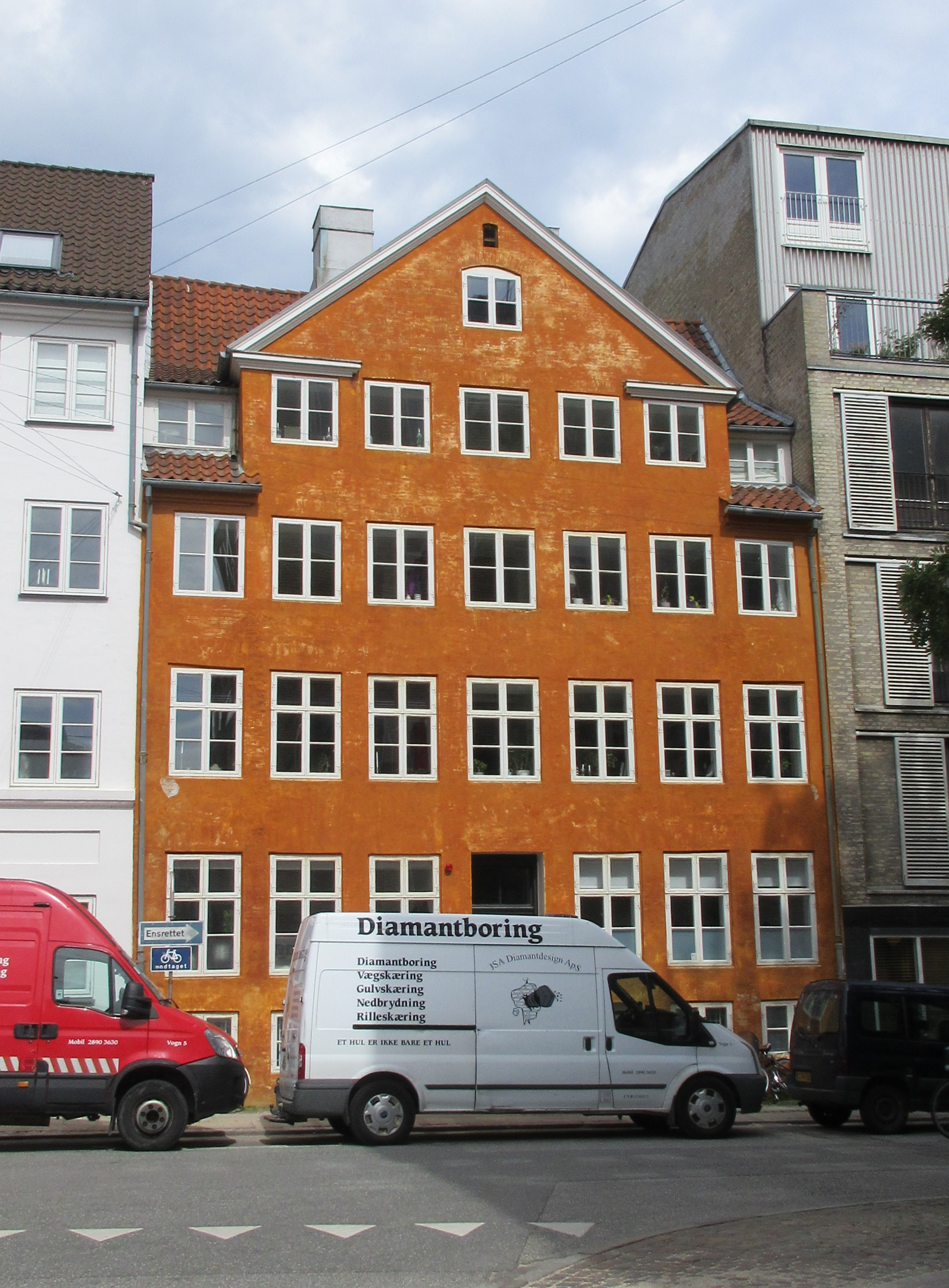
No. 26

Several of the other buildings in the street also date from the 18th century and are examples of the so-called "fire houses" that were built immediately after the Fire of 1728. No. 25 was originally built for court sculptor Friderich Ehbisch in 1733. Its facade was originally decorated with reliefs on all floors as well as on the dormer but they were removed when the building was converted into a warehouse in 1895–96. The neighbouring building at No. 27 was built for Trabant Elias Dordé. The painter Wilhelm Bendz lived in the building in the late 1820s and early 1830s. No. 23 (Åbenrå 23 / Hauser Plads 24) is also from the 1730s and listed.

No. 26, with its large, five-bay wall dormer, is from the 1750s. The eleven-bay building at No. 28-30 was originally two houses from the 1730s but they were later expanded with an extra floor and merged into one building in the late 19th century.

The modern property at No. 20, Blanche, is a dormitory. It is from 1961 and was designed by Steen Eiler Rasmussen in collaboration with Kai L. Larsen.

== Cultural references ==
In Ludvig Holberg's play Jacob von Thyboe someone mentions "the poet from Åbenrå", a reference to a then well-known writer of occasional poems who lived in the street.

== See also ==
- Suhmsgade
