= Vitus Bering (1617–1675) =

Danish poet and historian (1617–1675)

Vitus Pedersen Bering
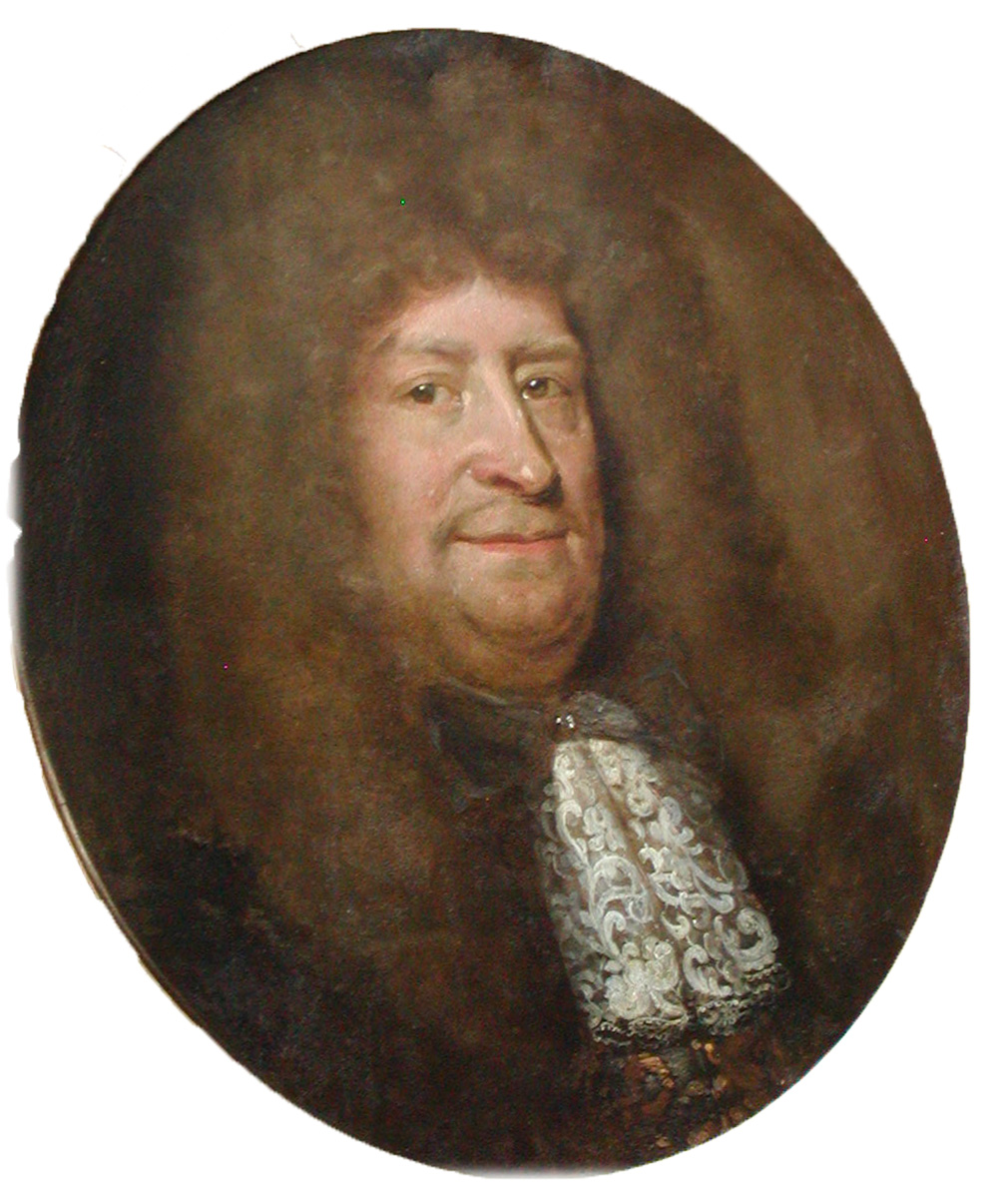
- Portrait by Abraham Wuchters, 17th century
- Born: 6 October 1617; Viborg, Denmark
- Died: 10 May 1675 (aged 57); Copenhagen, Denmark

Vitus Pedersen Bering (6 October 1617 – 20 May 1675) was a Danish poet and historian. He served as Danish Historiographer Royal and was the great-uncle of the explorer Vitus Bering (1681–1741).

== Early life and education ==
Vitus Pedersen Bering was born in Viborg, Denmark. Bering was the son of the city mayor Peder Pedersen Bering and Maren Vitusdatter Brun. He graduated from Viborg Katedralskole in 1635. He soon attracted attention for his poems in Latin and was called to serve as steward for Otte Thott, son of Scania county governor Tage Thott (1580–1658). He subsequently conducted a seven-year foreign trip to Leiden (1639), Orléans (1640), Siena (1642), Rome and Padua (1647) and Strasbourg and Basel (1648).

== Career ==
After their return to Denmark, he took a Master's degree at the University of Copenhagen in 1649. He immediately assumed a position as professor poeseos at the University of Copenhagen. Later that same year he was appointed to professor in history at Sorø Academy and Historiographer Royal. In late 1651, he was granted permission to resign as professor.

His patron, Tage Thott, made arrangements for a residence at Skabersjö Castle in Scania. The king granted him the former archbishop's house Lundegård at Lund. The Danish loss of Scania to Sweden as a result of the Treaty of Roskilde in 1658 made Bering a Swedish subject. With support from Corfitz Ulfeldt (1606–1664) he negotiated with King Charles XI of Sweden for a position as Swedish Historiographer. The king approved his proposal in 1659 but Bering managed to sell his estate to Peder Winstrup (1605–1679), Bishop of the Diocese of Lund. in 1660 and chose instead to leave Scania.

He was well-received in Denmark and became a member of the Treasury college (skatkammerkollegiet) on 11 November 1660. In ca. 1669, he was also appointed Supreme Court justice. He also kept the position as historiographer.

== Works ==
Bering was tasked with writing a general history of Denmark, a work on the reign of King Christian IV of Denmark and a work on recent events such as the assault on Copenhagen in 1659 and the institution of Absolutism in 1660. Neither of these were published prior to his death. His only publication was a critical work on England, Orosij Annilonis dissertalio de bello Dano-Anglico (1667), a defense of the Danish king's policy.

His work Obsidio Hafniensis on the assault on Copenhagen was published posthumously in 1676. His largest work, Floms Danicus, an account of Danish history in Latin reaching back to 1448, was not published until 1698. It was in the style used in the works attributed to 2nd-century Roman historian Publius Annius Florus. Historically, it is of little interest, being merely a stylistical treatment of older sources. It was, however, praised in its own time.

Bering was also a popular writer of Occasional poetry. Few of Bering's poems have survived. They represent the transition in Danish Baroque poetry from Anders Bording (1619–1677) to Thomas Kingo (1634–1703) both of whom were among his personal friends.

== Personal life ==
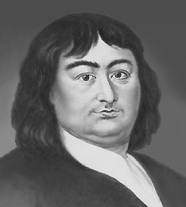
Vitus Pedersen Bering's portrait, long mistakenly believed to belong to his nephew

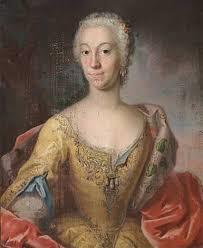
Vita Bering, his daughter

Bering married Anne Nielsdatter, daughter of Niels Pedersen Aurilesius (1601–1634), rector of the University of Copenhagen, on 13 June 1652. She died in 1657. On 15 September 1663, he then married Gertrud Jørgensdatter, daughter of Jørgen Hansen (1613–1673) and Kirstine Knudsdatter (died 1702).

In 1666, King Christian V granted him the Klampenborg area north of Copenhagen for life. Bering constructed a small country house on the land and named it Christiansholm after the king. The king also granted him another country estate, probably Farumgård, shortly prior to his death in 1675.

His great-nephew cartographer and sailor Vitus Jonassen Bering (1681–1741) entered Russian service, and made himself a name as an explorer, commanding the First Kamchatka Expedition and Great Northern Expedition, where he perished at 60 years of age. Their similar names and the lack of the latter man's reliable portraits has led to a lot of confusion, and, until the explorer's remains were recovered in 1991, the portrait of his uncle was believed to belong to him.
