= Michigan Tech Research Institute =

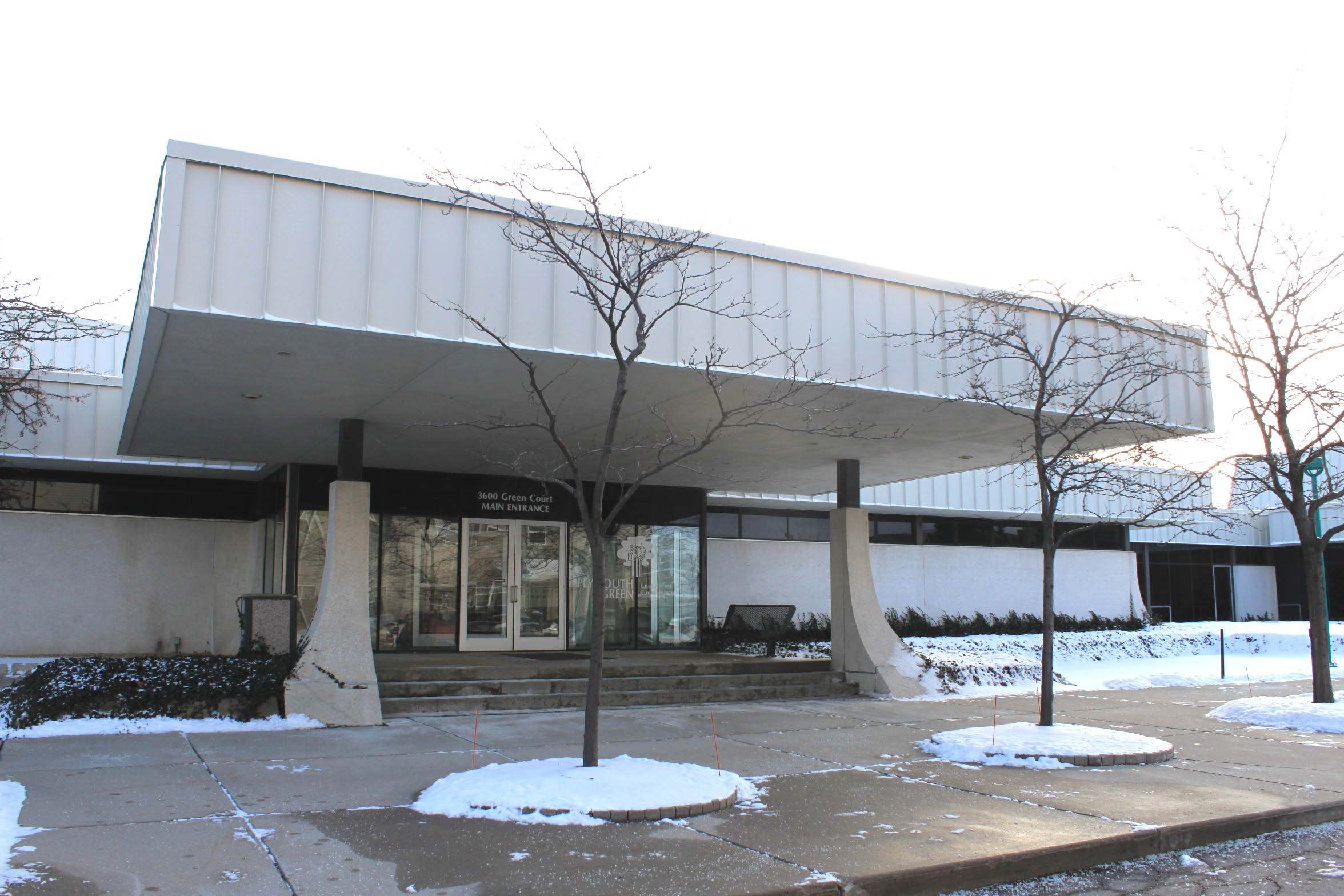
Main entrance to Plymouth Green Innovation Community, which houses MTRI

The Michigan Tech Research Institute (MTRI) is a research center of Michigan Technological University located in Ann Arbor, Michigan. The institute specializes in advancing the state of the art in remote sensing and information technology for a variety of applications.

MTRI has its heritage in the branch of the Environmental Research Institute of Michigan (ERIM) that remained not-for-profit and developed into the Altarum Institute after ERIM's organization was divided by a corporate takeover in the late 1990s. It became part of Michigan Tech in 2006 and includes research programs related to national security, protecting and evaluating critical infrastructure, bioinformatics, earth sciences, and environmental processes, including transportation.
