= De Vit =

De Vit, DeVit, or de Vit is a surname. Notable people with the surname include:

- Tony De Vit (1957–1998), English DJ and music producer
- Vincenzo de Vit (1810–1892), Italian scholar and historian

== See also ==
- Cosima De Vito
- Mia De Vits (born 1950), Belgian politician
