= Vid =

Vid or VID may refer to:

== In linguistics ==
- VID, the Sanskrit root of Vidya, meaning "to know" and related to "veda".
- "vid", Eye dialect spelling of "with"
- Vid (given name), Slavic given name

== In mythology ==
- Vid or Svetovid (Svantovid), a Slavic god that is the origin of various Slavic toponyms
- Víd, one of the Élivágar rivers in Norse mythology

== In geography ==
- Vid (river), a river in Bulgaria also known as Vit
- Vid, Croatia, a small settlement and archeological site near Metković
- Vid, Hungary, a village near Veszprém

== In science ==
- Vienna Institute of Demography, a research institute of the Austrian Academy of Sciences and the Wittgenstein Centre for Demography and Global Human Capital
- VID Specialized University, a higher education and research institution in Norway.

== In technology ==
- Voltage Identification Digital, a digital specification for output voltages
- Logitech Vid, a VoIP service based on SightSpeed
- VLAN Identifier, a data field in IEEE 802.1Q VLAN tagging
- slang for video or videotape

== In business ==
- Grupo Editorial Vid, a publishing group from Mexico
- VID (company), a television company in Russia

== Other uses ==
- Short for "virus disease", referring to viral disease
