= VIT University (disambiguation) =

VIT University may refer to one of several universities in India:

- Vellore Institute of Technology, formerly VIT University, in Tamil Nadu
- VIT-AP University, in Andhra Pradesh
- VIT Bhopal University, in Madhya Pradesh

== See also ==
- VIT (disambiguation)
