= Vitis (disambiguation) =

Vitis is a genus of about 60 species of plants in the flowering plant family Vitaceae

Vitis can also refer to:

- vine staff, the centurion's rod used for discipline in the Roman army
- Vitis, Austria
- Vitis, Peru and Vitis District, a town and a district of the province Yauyos
- VITIS, or the Krastyo Sarafov National Academy for Theatre and Film Arts, in Sofia, Bulgaria
- Vitis, the Latin name for the Montone
- AMD Vitis, formerly known as Xilinx Vitis, an IDE for developing designs with Xilinx's FPGAs.

== See also ==
- Vitus (disambiguation)
