= Vincenzo de Vit =

Reverend Vincenzo de Vit
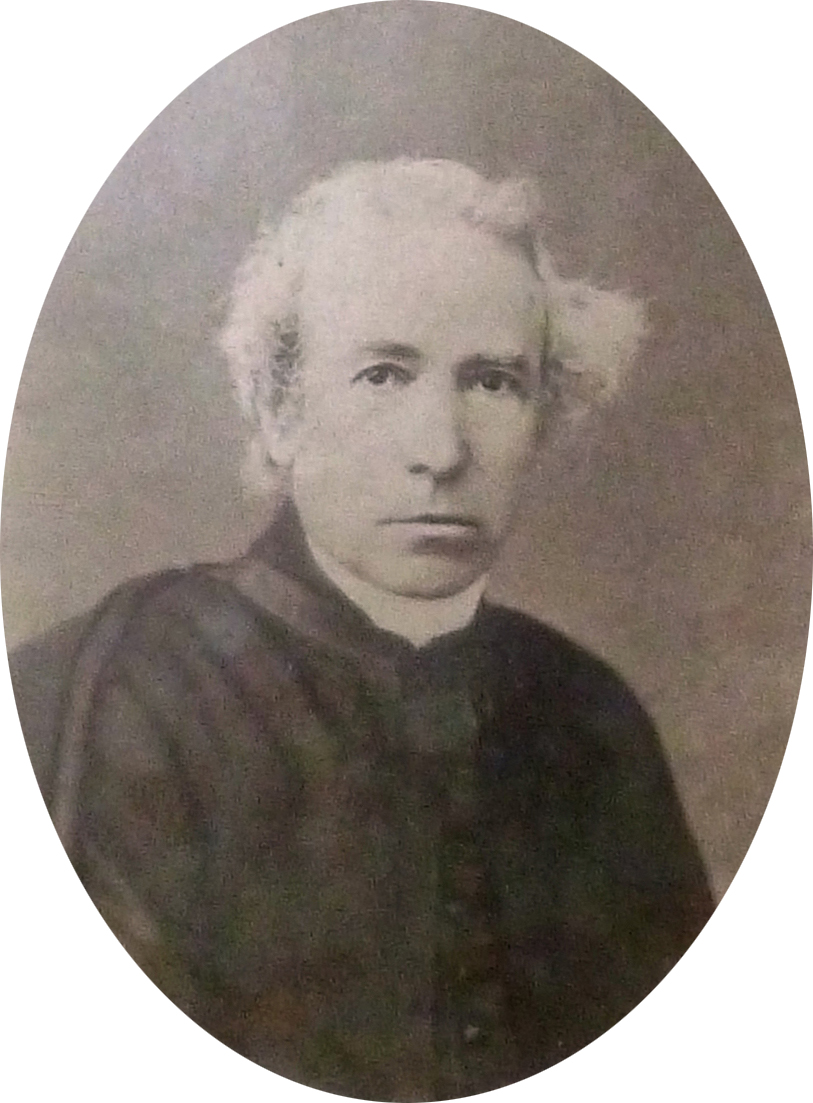
- Born: July 10, 1811; Mestrino, French Empire
- Died: 18 August 1892 (aged 81); Domodossola, Kingdom of Italy
- Occupations: Catholic priest, translator, university teacher, philologist
- Known for: Revision of Egidio Forcellini's Lexicon totius latinitatis
- Title: abbot
- Parent(s): Antonio De Vit and Elisabetta De Vit (née Carturana)

Academic background
- Education: University of Padua
- Influences: Giuseppe Furlanetto; Egidio Forcellini; Antonio Rosmini

Academic work
- Discipline: Classical scholar, Latinist
- Influenced: Theodor Mommsen

Vincenzo de Vit (b. Mestrina, near Padua, 10 July 1810; d. Domodossola, 18 August 1892) was an Italian Latin scholar and historian of Ancient Rome.

== Biography ==
He made his studies at Padua, was ordained priest in 1836, in 1844 became librarian of the Academia dei Concordi at Rovigo and canon of the cathedral. He was thus advancing in the path of ecclesiastical honours, but under the influence of Antonio Rosmini-Serbati he entered the latter's religious order, known as the Institute of Charity, in Stresa. He began his revision of Egidio Forcellini's lexicon in Stresa. Compelled to have recourse to libraries, he went first to Florence in 1861, and in 1862 to Rome, where he took up his residence, returning to Northern Italy in the summer.

== Works ==
De Vit's idea differed from that of Forcellini and Furlanetto, it being his intention to include in his book all the periods and all the varieties of Latin down to A.D. 568. He likewise gave an exact digest of the authors of the Church Fathers, and accorded considerable space to inscriptions, which he also treated in special works. His work was a third larger than Furlanetto's edition, which extension compelled him to leave out proper names. The Lexicon totius latinitatis was completed in 1879. De Vit undertook the Onomasticon, which he brought down to the beginning of the letter P. The "Lexicon" allows the restoration of the exact history of each word according to writers and periods.

He also worked on the history of his home town, and published his researches in eight volumes:

- Il lago maggiore Stresa e le isole Borromeo (Prato, 1875–78)
- Memorie storiche di Borgomanero e del suo mandamento (1859; 2nd ed., 1880)
- Adria e le sue antiche epigrafi illustrate (Prato, 1888)
- La provincia romana dell' Ossola ossia delle Alpe Atreziane (Pratom 1892).

All these works were collected in a series of "Opere varie" (11 vols., Prato, 1875–92), which also contains numerous memoirs of antiquity and lexicography, the best known being Della distinzione tra i Britanni o Brittonnni dell' Isola e i Britanni o Brittonni del continente, (Modena, 1867–72). According to de Vit the name Brittany was given to Armorica because some Brythons had established themselves there in the time of Julius Caesar, coming from the east bank of the Rhine. These must have been the Britons, while the inhabitants of the island must have been the Britanni. A confusion of names subsequently arose. This theory has not, however, been accepted by scholars. Another dissertation (1873–74 and 1881), concerning the road of the invasion of the Cimbri, and on the site of the Battle of Aquae Sextiae, also aroused controversy.

== Sources ==
- cites:
  - Ferrero, Ermanno (1899). "Vincenzo De-Vit". Biographisches Jahrbuch für Altertumskunde. XXII. Leipzig: 26–30.
- Nardo, Dante (1991). "DE VIT, Vincenzo". Dizionario Biografico degli Italiani (in Italian). Vol. 39: Deodato–Di Falco. Rome: Istituto dell'Enciclopedia Italiana. ISBN 978-88-12-00032-6.
- Works by or about Vincenzo de Vit at the Internet Archive
