= Altarum Institute =

American Nonprofit research organization

Altarum
- Type: Nonprofit
- Industry: Health Systems Research
- Founded: 1946
- Headquarters: Novi, Michigan, United States
- Key people: Michael Monson, CEO
- Products: Health care consulting, Health systems research
- Number of employees: 450 (2016)
- Website: http://www.altarum.org

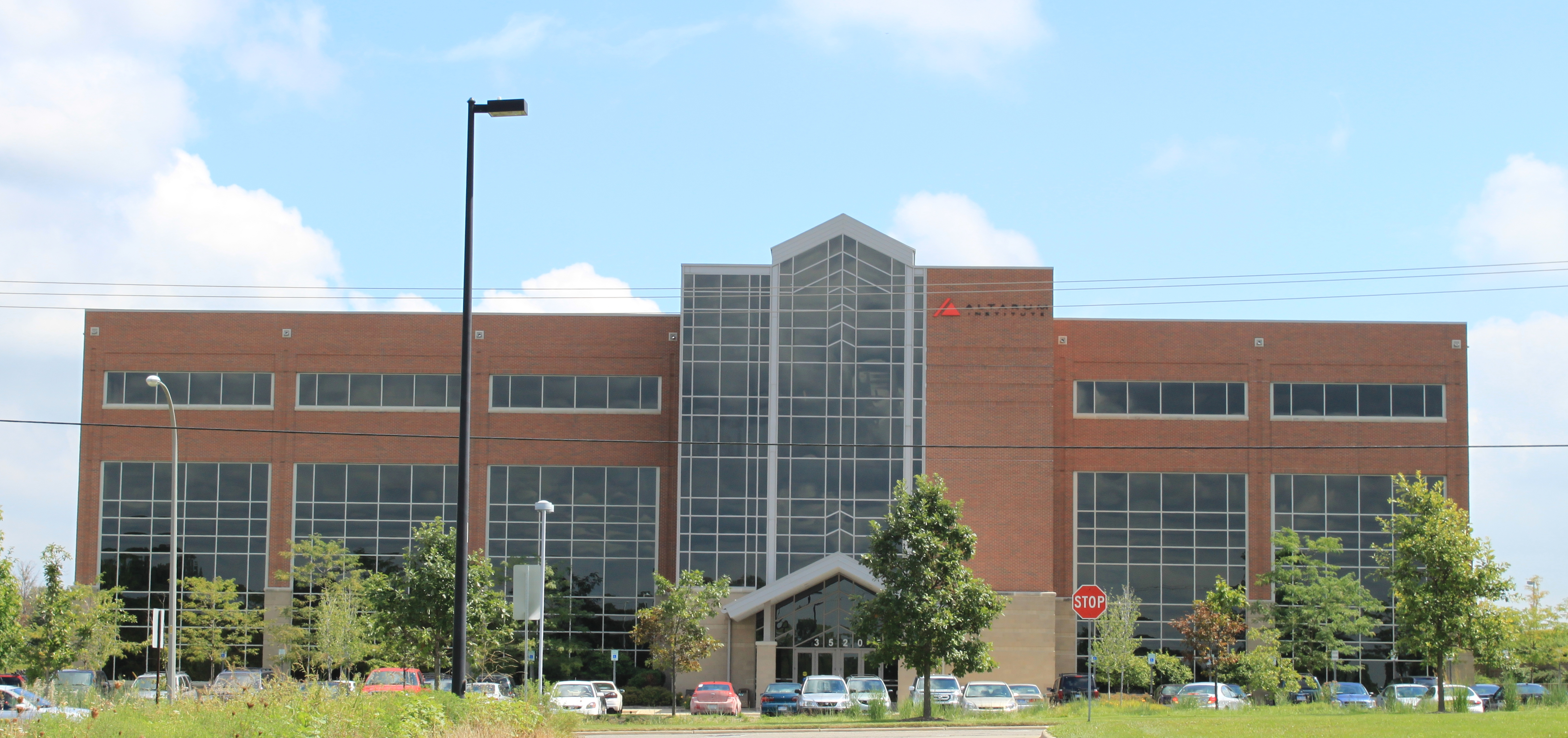
Headquarters building from Green Road, Ann Arbor

Altarum is a nonprofit research and consulting organization that serves government health insurers, health foundations, and other nonprofit clients that focus on health and health care. Altarum traces its history back to 1946 as Willow Run Laboratory in Ypsilanti, Michigan. In 1972, Willow Run became the Environmental Research Institute of Michigan (ERIM). In 2001, ERIM acquired Vector Research, Inc., a health care information system company, and changed its name to Altarum.

In 2009, Altarum acquired KAI Research, Inc., adding to its portfolio clinical research for the pharmaceutical and biotech industries, academic institutions, and the National Institutes of Health. In 2011, Altarum acquired Palladian Partners, a Maryland-based science, medical, and public health communications firm that serves government agencies and private companies. Altarum expanded its work into advanced data analytics and value-based payment in 2017 by integrating the Health Care Incentives Improvement Institute into its operations.

== Research ==
Altarum conducts research related to vulnerable and publicly insured populations. In 2018, Altarum released a report funded by the Kellogg Foundation on the economic benefits of eliminating racial disparities. It also estimated the economic cost of the opioid crisis to have reached $1 trillion from 2001 through 2017. Altarum also analyzes health sector spending, prices and employment.

== Health IT ==
In 2010 with funding from a federal grant, Altarum established the Michigan Center for Effective IT Adoption to provide consulting and support to thousands of physicians in Michigan seeking to integrate use of electronic health records systems into their practices.

With funding from the Centers for Medicare & Medicaid Services, Altarum developed an integrated care model to enable primary care physicians to conduct oral health screenings for children, and to refer them to dentists to ensure they receive preventive dental care.
