= Saint-Vit (disambiguation) =

Saint-Vit may refer to:

- Saint-Vit, Saint-Vit, Doubs, Bourgogne-Franche-Comté, France
- Canton of Saint-Vit, Doubs, Bourgogne-Franche-Comté, France
- Saint Vitus, in French

== See also ==
- Saint Guy (disambiguation)
