= Michigan Aeronautical Research Center =

Future thought leadership incubator

The Michigan Aeronautical Research Center (MARC) was one of America's leading air research organizations, run by the University of Michigan at Willow Run Airport. It played a leading role in the creation of the Bomarc Missile Program, alongside Boeing.

Willow Run Laboratories was created in 1946, and in 1950, in recognition of an expanded research program, its name was changed to Willow Run Research Center, which would eventually be spun off from the university in 1972 to form the Environmental Research Institute of Michigan. Work at Willow Run during 1953 included testing throttlable rocket motors and hypergolic propellants.
