= Cape Chukotsky =

Cape in Siberia

Cape Chukotsky Мыс Чукотский
- Cape
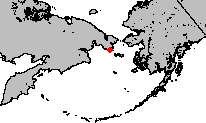

- Coordinates: 64°16′00″N 173°04′00″W

Cape Chukotsky is located in the south-east of the Chukotka Peninsula, at the east entrance to the Providence Bay and the northern boundary of Gulf of Anadyr; it borders the Bering Sea and Bering Strait. This rocky cape hosts a bird colony with a population of one thousand northern fulmars, pelagic cormorants, black-legged kittiwakes, Urias, pigeon guillemots and horned puffins.

The cape was discovered by the First Kamchatka Expedition on 8 August 1728. On that day, a boat of eight Chukchi men approached an expedition ship, which hinted Aleksei Chirikov to choose the name for the cape.
