= Vitus Lake =

Lake in the state of Alaska, United States

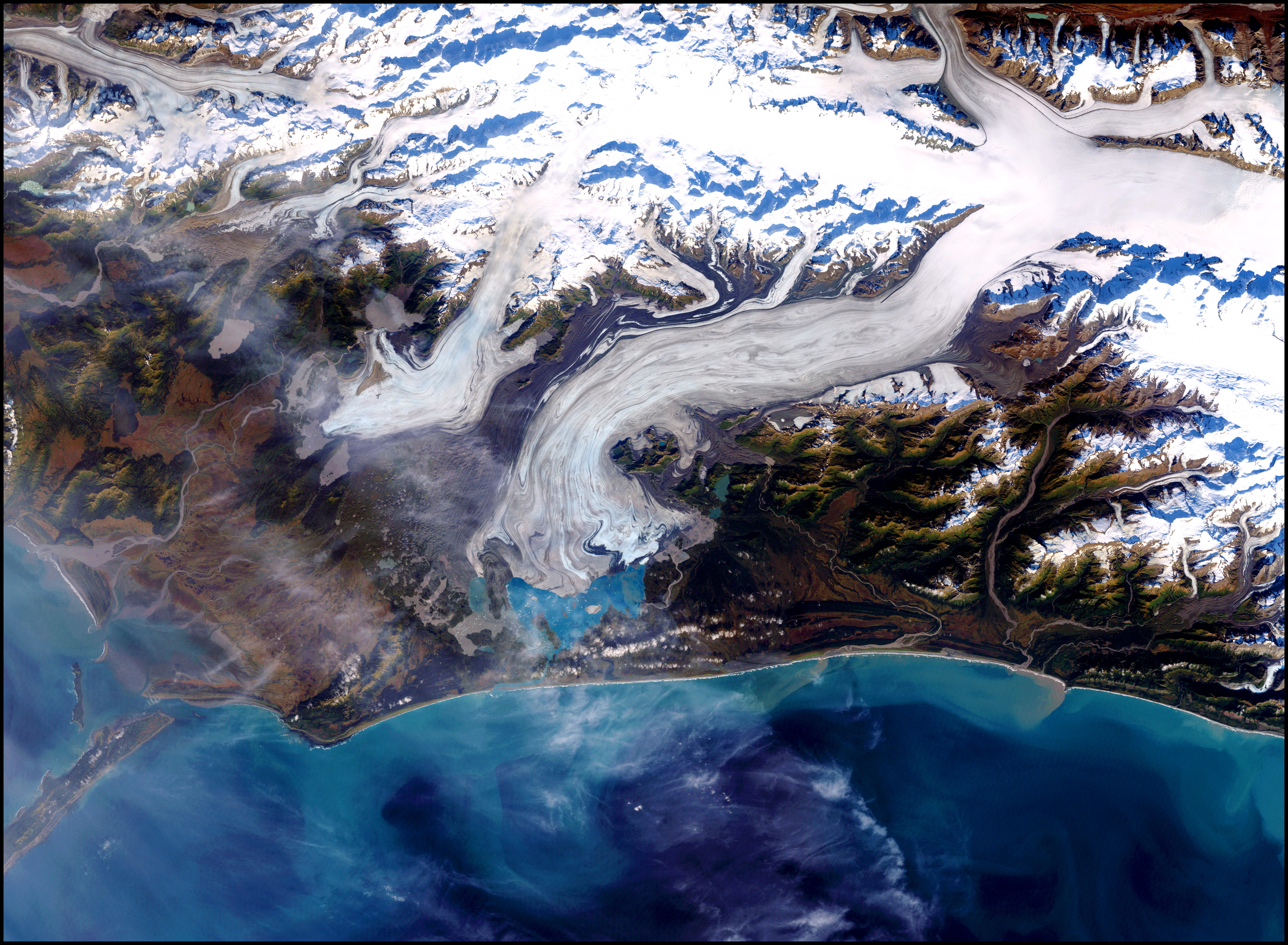

- Location within Alaska
- Location: Yakutat City and Borough, Alaska
- Coordinates: 60°07′32″N 143°25′05″W
- Etymology: Vitus Bering, leader of the 1741 expedition to Alaska
- Primary outflows: Seal River
- Basin countries: United States
- Max. length: 23 km (14 mi)
- Max. width: 9 km (5.6 mi)

Vitus Lake is a lake in Alaska. It is 23 kilometres (14 mi) long and 9 kilometres (5.6 mi) wide. It is named for Vitus Bering, leader of the 1741 expedition to Alaska. Vitus Lake forms the southern limit of the Bering Lobe, outlets via the Seal River to the Gulf of Alaska.

== Legends ==
It is also allegedly home to Vittie, a cryptid and local legend. The name Vittie is a derivation of the name Nessie, the cryptid allegedly living in Loch Ness.
