= Vitus Bering =

Danish-born Russian explorer (1681–1741)

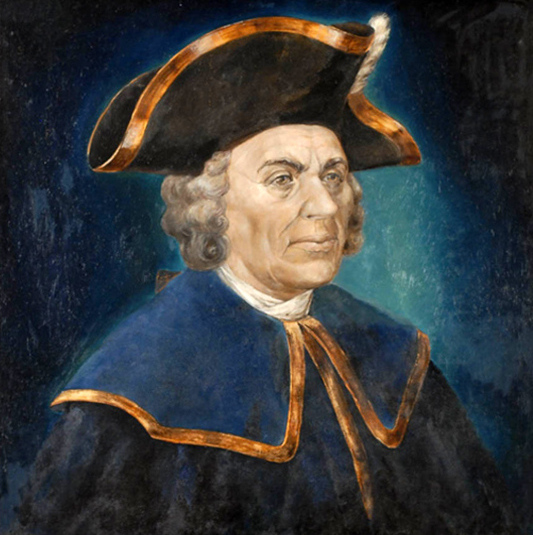
- Born: Vitus Jonassen Bering; 5 August 1681; Horsens, Denmark–Norway
- Died: 19 December 1741 (aged 60); Bering Island, Bering Sea
- Military career
- Allegiance: Russian Empire
- Branch: Imperial Russian Navy
- Service years: 1704–1741
- Expeditions: First Kamchatka Expedition; Second Kamchatka Expedition

Signature
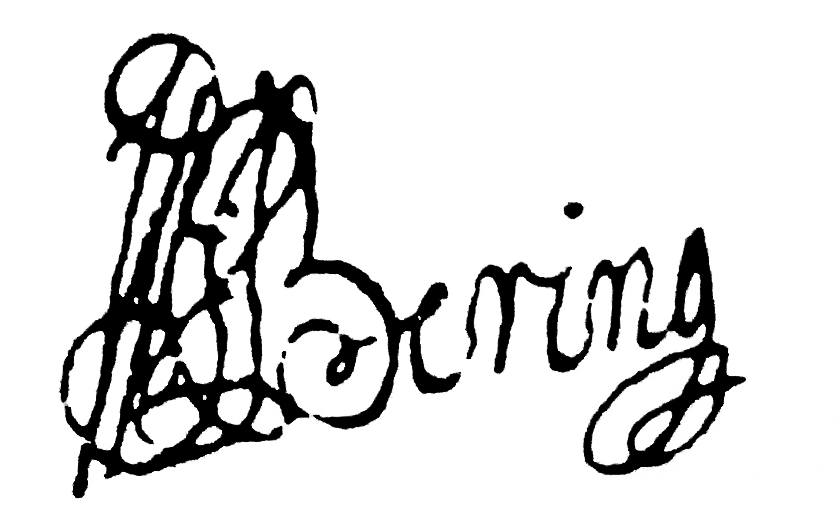

Vitus Jonassen Bering (Note: Pronunciations: /ˈbɛərɪŋ, ˈbɛrɪŋ/, BAIR-ing, BERR-ing, US also /ˈbɪərɪŋ/, BEER-ing, Danish: [ˈviːtsʰus ˈjoːnæsn̩ ˈpe̝(ː)ɐ̯e̝ŋ];) (baptised 5 August 1681 – 19 December 1741), (Note: All dates are here given in the Julian calendar, which was in use throughout Russia at the time.) also known as Ivan Ivanovich Bering, (Note: Russian: Иван Иванович Беринг) was a Danish-born Russian cartographer, explorer, and officer in the Russian Navy. He is known as a leader of two Russian expeditions, the First Kamchatka Expedition and the Great Northern Expedition, exploring the northeastern coast of the Asian continent and from there the western coast of the North American continent. The Bering Strait, the Bering Sea, Bering Island, the Bering Glacier, and Vitus Lake were all named in his honor.

== Biography ==
=== Early life and family background ===
Vitus Bering was born in the port town of Horsens in Denmark to Anne Pedderdatter and her husband Jonas Svendsen (a "customs inspector and churchwarden") and was baptized in the Lutheran church there on 5 August 1681. He was named after a maternal great-uncle, Vitus Pedersen Bering, who had been a chronicler in the royal court, and was not long deceased at the time of Vitus Jonassen Bering's birth. The family enjoyed reasonable financial security, with two of Vitus's elder half-brothers both attending the University of Copenhagen.

=== Early seafaring career ===
Vitus instead signed on as a ship's boy at age 15. Between 1696 and 1704, he traveled the seas, reaching India and the Dutch East Indies while also finding time to complete naval officer training in Amsterdam. He later claimed (not without some supporting evidence) to have served on Danish whalers in the North Atlantic, visiting European colonies in the Caribbean and on North America's eastern seaboard.

=== Russian naval service ===
In 1704, he enrolled with the rapidly expanding navy of Tsar Peter I. Under Norwegian-born Russian admiral Cornelius Cruys's guidance, Bering gained an officer's commission into the Russian Navy, with the rank of sub-lieutenant. He was repeatedly promoted in Peter the Great's rapidly evolving navy, reaching the rank of second captain by 1720. In that time, it appears he was not involved in any sea battles, but commanded several vessels on potentially dangerous missions, including the transport of a ship from the Azov Sea on Russia's southern coast to the Baltic on its northern coast. His work in the latter stages of the Great Northern War (ending in 1721), for example, was dominated by lightering duties.

=== Marriage and family life ===
On 8 October 1713, Bering married Anna Christina Pülse; the ceremony took place in the Lutheran church at Vyborg. Over the next 18 years, they had nine children, four of whom survived childhood. During his time with the Russian Navy—particularly as part of the Great Northern War—he was unable to spend much time with Anna, who was approximately 11 years Bering's junior and the daughter of a Swedish merchant.

=== Retirement and reinstatement ===
Bering served with the navy in significant but non-combat roles during the Great Northern War. At the war's conclusion in 1721, Bering was not promoted like many of his contemporaries. The omission proved particularly embarrassing when, in 1724, Anna's younger sister Eufemia upstaged her by marrying Thomas Saunders, already a rear-admiral despite a much shorter period of service.

To save face, Bering retired from the navy to avoid the continuing embarrassment of his low rank to his wife, and upon retirement was promoted to first captain. He was also able to secure two months pay. Shortly after, the family—Bering, his wife, and two young sons—moved out of St. Petersburg to live with Anna's family in Vyborg.

Bering was permitted to keep the rank when he rejoined the Russian Navy later that year.

=== Return to active service ===
After five months of joblessness, Bering, keenly aware of his dependents, reapplied to the Admiralty. He was accepted for a renewed period of active service the same day. By 2 October 1724, Bering (retaining the rank of first captain he had secured earlier in the year) was back on the sea, commanding the 90-gun Lesnoe (Russian: Лесное, lit. 'Forest'). But the tsar soon had a new command for him.

=== First Kamchatka Expedition ===
==== St. Petersburg to Okhotsk ====
On 29 December 1724 [N.S. 9 January 1725], Peter I of Russia ordered Bering to captain the First Kamchatka Expedition, an expedition set to sail north from Russian outposts on the Kamchatka Peninsula, with the charge to map the new areas visited and establish whether Asia and America shared a land border.

Preparations for the trip had begun some years before, but with his health rapidly deteriorating, the Tsar had ordered that the process be hurried, and it was with this backdrop that Bering (with his knowledge of both the Indian Ocean and the eastern seaboard of North America, good personal skills and experience in transporting goods) was selected ahead of the experienced cartographer K. P. von Verd.

His lieutenants for the journey, which became known as the First Kamchatka Expedition, were the hardened Danish-born Russian Martin Spanberg and the well-educated but relatively inexperienced Russian Aleksei Chirikov, a respected naval instructor. They would receive annual salaries of some 180 roubles during the trip; Bering would be paid 480.

The final papers from Peter before his death on 28 January made it clear to Bering that he should proceed to the Kamchatka Peninsula, build one or two ships there, and, keeping the land on his left, sail northwards until the land turned westwards, making it clear that there existed sea between Asia and North America.

Instructions were left on how to proceed if North America was sighted during the voyage, which was scheduled to last three years. The natural route to Kamchatka was along tributaries of the Lena; but after the Treaty of Nerchinsk (1689) this looked politically infeasible. Instead, Bering's party, it was decided, would travel over land and river from St. Petersburg to Okhotsk, a small port town on Russia's eastern coast, and then by sea from Okhotsk to the Kamchatka Peninsula, where they could start their voyage of exploration.

On 24 January, Chirikov departed with 26 of the 34-strong expedition along the well-travelled roads to Vologda, 411 miles (661 km) to the east, aided by the expertise of Lieutenants Martin Spanberg and Aleksei Chirikov. The party took on men as it headed toward Okhotsk, encountering many difficulties before arriving at the settlement.

Having waited for the necessary paperwork to be completed, Bering and the remaining members of the expedition followed on 6 February 1725. Bering was supplied with what few maps Peter had managed to commission in the preceding years.

From there, the men sailed to the Kamchatka Peninsula, preparing new ships there and sailing north—repeating a little-documented journey of Semyon Dezhnyov 80 years earlier.

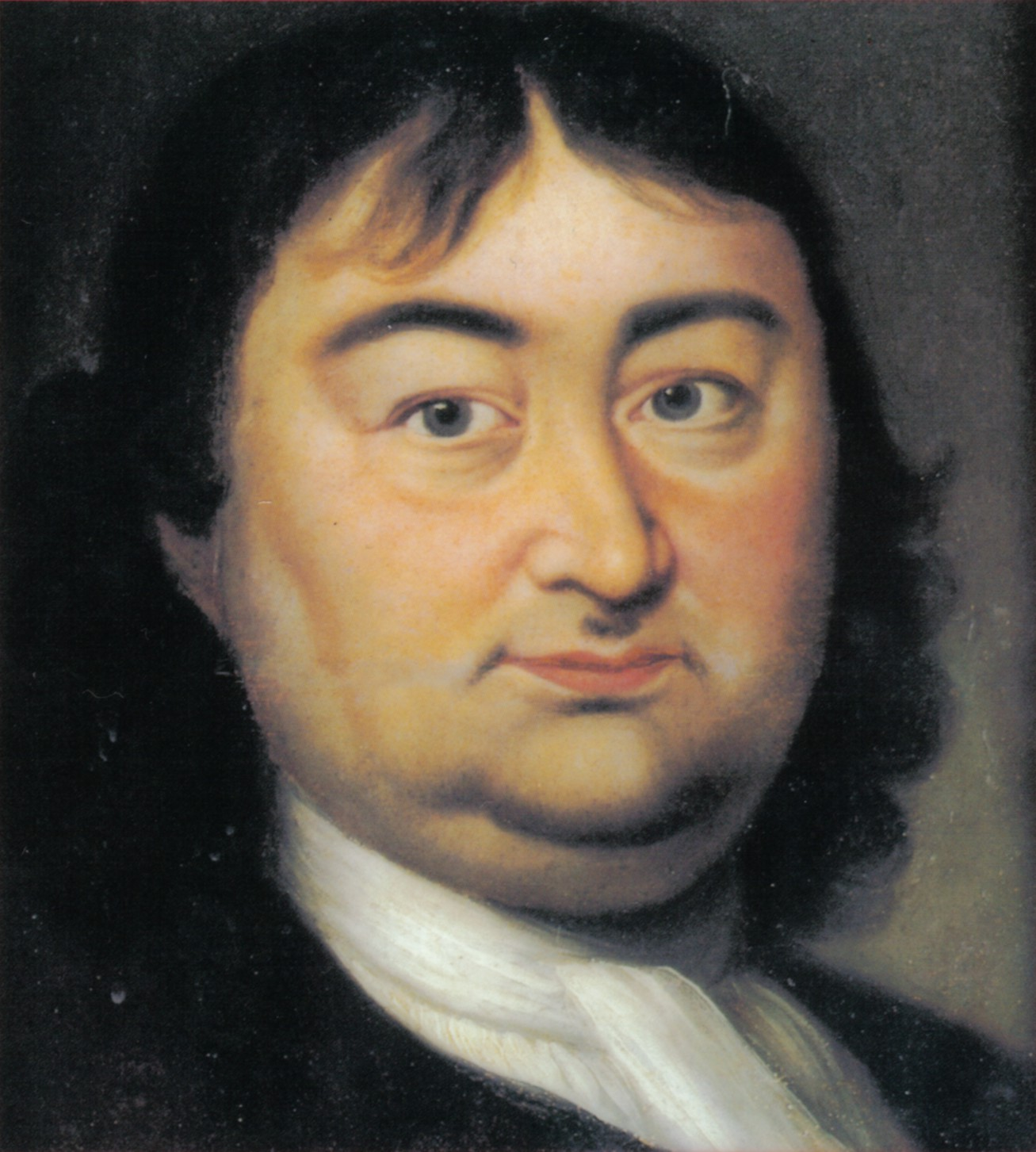
A portrait once believed to be of Vitus Bering (according to later data, it is probably of his uncle) (Note: In 1991 a Russian-Danish expedition found Bering's burial site. Analysis of Bering's skull also showed that Bering could not have had such a round face, as is depicted in most pictures. The analysis showed a man of strong stature and a more angular face. The portrait most frequently attributed to Bering may possibly be the writer Vitus Pedersen Bering, who was Bering's uncle.)

Both parties used horse-drawn sledges and made good time over the first legs of the journey. On 14 February they were reunited in Vologda, and, now travelling together, headed eastwards across the Ural Mountains, arriving in the small city of Tobolsk (one of the main stopping points of the journey) on 16 March. They had already travelled over 1750 miles. At Tobolsk, Bering took on more men to help the party through the more difficult journey ahead. He asked for 24 more from the garrison, before upping the request to 54 after hearing that the ship the party required at Okhotsk—the Vostok (Восто́к, 'East')—would need significant manpower to repair.

In the end, the governor could spare only 39, but it still represented a significant expansion in numbers for the party. In addition, Bering wanted 60 carpenters and 7 blacksmiths; the governor responded that half of these would have to be taken on later, at Yeniseysk. After some delays preparing equipment and funds, on 14 May the now much enlarged party left Tobolsk, heading along the Irtysh. The journey ahead to the next major stopping point Yakutsk, was well-worn, but rarely by groups as large as Bering's, who had the additional difficulty of needing to take on more men as the journey progressed. As a result, the party ran behind schedule, reaching Surgut on 30 May and Makovsk in late June before entering Yeniseysk, where the additional men could be taken on; Bering would later claim that "few were suitable". In any case, the party left Yeniseysk on 12 August, desperately needing to make up lost time. On 26 September they arrived at Ilimsk, just three days before the river froze over. After the party had completed an eighty-mile trek to Ust-Kut, a town on the Lena where they could spend the winter, Bering travelled on to the town of Irkutsk both to get a sense of the conditions and to seek advice on how best to get their large party across the mountains separating Yakutsk (their next stop) to Okhotsk on the coast.

After leaving Ust-Kut when the river ice melted in the spring of 1726, the party rapidly travelled down the River Lena, reaching Yakutsk in the first half of June. Despite the need for hurry and men being sent in advance, the governor was slow to grant them the resources they needed, prompting threats from Bering. On 7 July, Spanberg left with a detachment of 209 men and much of the cargo; on 27 July apprentice shipbuilder Fyodor Kozlov led a small party to reach Okhotsk ahead of Spanberg, both to prepare food supplies and to start work repairing the Vostok and building a new ship, the Fortuna (Russian: Фортуна, lit. 'Fortune'), needed to carry the party across the bay from Okhotsk to the Kamchatka Peninsula. Bering himself left on 16 August, whilst it was decided that Chirikov would follow the next spring with fresh supplies of flour. The journeys were as difficult as Bering had worried they would be. Both men and horses died, whilst other men (46 from Bering's party alone) deserted with their horses and portions of the supplies as they struggled to build roads across difficult marshland and river terrain.

If Bering's party (which reached Okhotsk in October) fared badly, however, Spanberg's fared far worse. His heavily loaded boats could be tugged at no more than one mile a day – and they had some 685 miles to cover. When the rivers froze, the cargo was transferred to sleds and the expedition continued, enduring blizzards and waist-high snow. Even provisions left by Bering at Yudoma Cross could not fend off starvation. On 6 January 1727, Spanberg and two other men, who had together formed an advance party carrying the most vital items for the expedition, reached Okhotsk; ten days later sixty others joined them, although many were ill. Parties sent by Bering back along the trail from Okhotsk rescued seven men and much of the cargo that had been left behind. Okhotsk's inhabitants described the winter as the worst they could recall; Bering seized flour from the local villagers to ensure that his party too could take advantage of their stocks and consequently the whole village soon faced the threat of starvation. The explorer later reported how it was only the arrival of an advance party of Chirikov's division in June with 27 tons of flour that ensured his party (by then diminished in numbers) could be fed.

==== Okhotsk to Kamchatka and beyond ====
The Vostok was readied and the Fortuna built at a rapid pace, with the first party (48 men commanded by Spanberg and comprising those required to start work on the ships that would have to be built in Kamchatka itself as soon as possible) leaving in June 1727. Chirikov himself arrived in Okhotsk soon after, bringing further supplies of food. He had had a relatively easy trip, losing none of his men and only 17 of the 140 horses he had set out with. On 22 August, the remainder of the party sailed for Kamchatka. Had the route been charted, they should have sailed around the peninsula and made port on its eastern coast; instead, they landed on the west and made a gruelling trip from the settlement of Bolsheretsk in the southwest, north to the Upper Kamchatka Post and then east along the Kamchatka River to the Lower Kamchatka Post. This Spanberg's party did before the river froze; next, a party led by Bering completed this final stint of approximately 580 miles over land without the benefit of the river; and finally, in the spring of 1728, the last party to leave Bolsheretsk, headed by Chirikov, reached the Lower Kamchatka Post. The outpost was six thousand miles from St. Petersburg and the journey itself (the first time "so many [had] gone so far") had taken some three years. The lack of immediate food available to Spanberg's advance party slowed their progress, which hastened dramatically after Bering's and Chirikov's group arrived with provisions. As a consequence, the ship they constructed—the St. Gabriel (Святой Гавриил, Sviatoi Gavriil)—was ready to be launched as soon as 9 June 1728 from its construction point upriver at Ushka. It was then fully rigged and provisioned by 9 July, and on 13 July set sail downstream, anchoring offshore that evening. On 14 July, Bering's party began their first exploration, hugging the coast in not a northerly direction (as they had expected) but a north-easterly one.

The ship's log records a variety of landmarks spotted (including St. Lawrence Island) many of which the expedition took the opportunity to name. Translation problems hindered the exploration attempt, however, as Bering was unable to discuss the local geography with locals he encountered. Sailing further north, Bering entered for the first time the strait that would later bear his name.

Reaching a cape (which Chirikov named Cape Chukotsky), the land turned westwards, and Bering asked his two lieutenants on 13 August 1728 whether or not they could reasonably claim it was turning westwards for good: that is to say, whether they had proven that Asia and America were separate land masses. The rapidly advancing ice prompted Bering to make the controversial decision not to deviate from his remit: the ship would sail for a few more days, but then turn back.

The expedition was neither at the most easterly point of Asia (as Bering had supposed) nor had it succeeded in discovering the Alaskan coast of America, which on a clear day would have been visible to the east. As promised, on 16 August, Bering turned the St. Gabriel around, heading back towards Kamchatka. Not before a storm forced hasty repairs, the ship was back at the mouth of the Kamchatka River, fifty days after it had left.

The mission was at its conclusion, but the party still needed to make it back to St. Petersburg to document the voyage (thus avoiding the fate of Semyon Dezhnyov who, unbeknownst to Bering, had made a similar expedition eighty years previously). In the spring of 1729, the Fortuna, which had sailed round the Kamchatka Peninsula to bring supplies to the Lower Kamchatka Post, now returned to Bolsheretsk; and shortly after, so did the St. Gabriel.

The delay was caused by a four-day journey Bering had embarked upon directly eastwards in search of North America, to no avail. By July 1729 the two vessels were back at Okhotsk, where they were moored alongside the Vostok; the party, no longer needing to carry shipbuilding materials made good time on the return journey from Okhotsk, and by 28 February 1730 Bering was back in the Russian capital. In December 1731 he would be awarded 1000 roubles and promoted to captain-commodore, his first noble rank (Spanberg and Chirikov were similarly promoted to captain). It had been a long and expensive expedition, costing 15 men and souring relations between Russia and her native peoples: but it had provided useful new (though not perfect) insights into the geography of Eastern Siberia, and presented useful evidence that Asia and North America were separated by sea. Bering had not, however, proved the separation beyond doubt.

=== Second Kamchatka expedition and death ===
==== Preparations ====
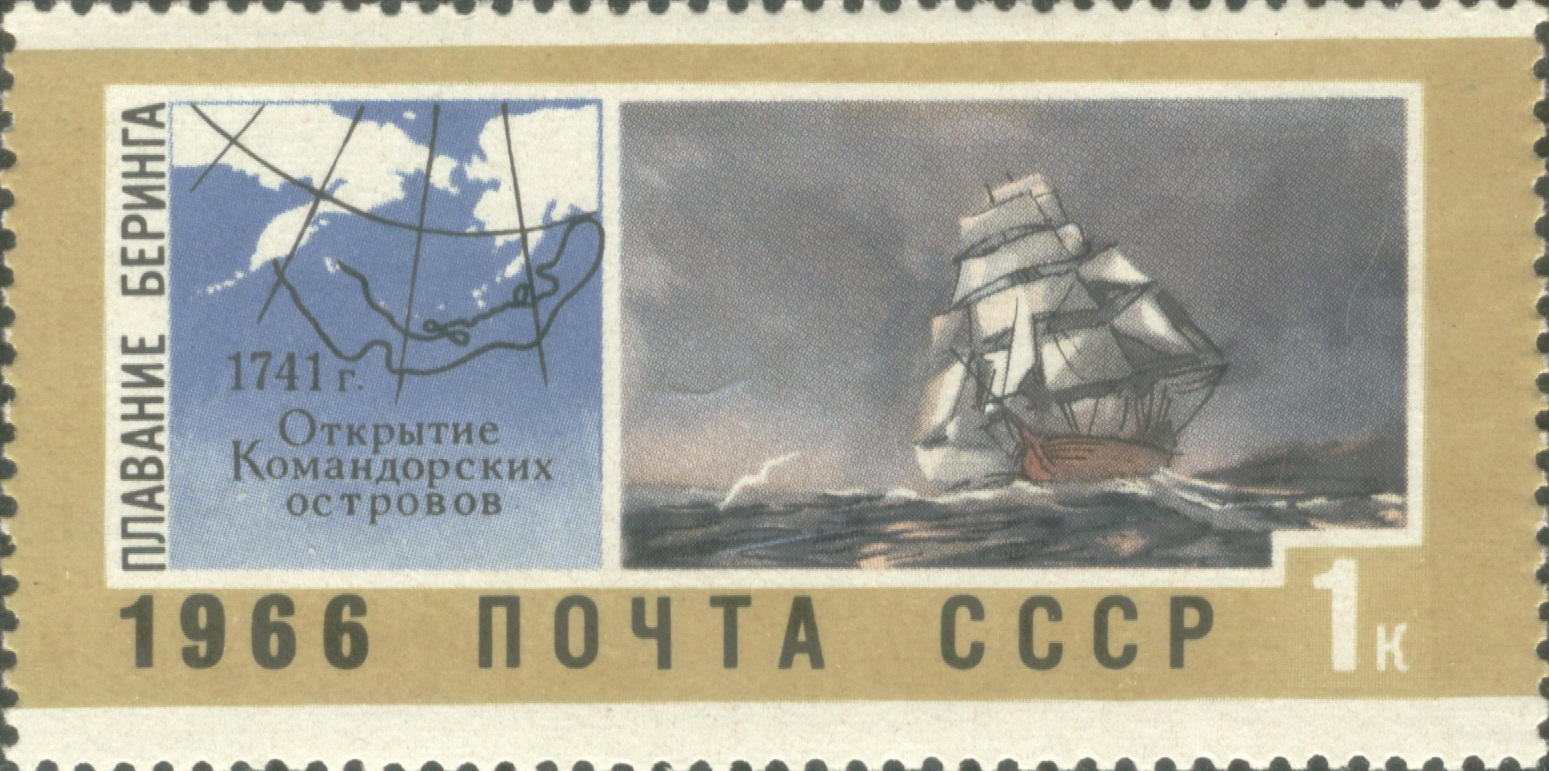
1966 Soviet postage stamp depicting Bering's second voyage and the discovery of the Commander Islands

Bering soon proposed a second Kamchatka expedition, much more ambitious than the first and with an explicit aim of sailing east in search of North America. The political situation in the Russian Empire was difficult, however, and this meant delays. In the interim, the Berings enjoyed their new-found status and wealth: there was a new house and a new social circle for the newly ennobled Berings. Bering also made a bequest to the poor of Horsens, had two children with Anna and even attempted to establish his familial coat of arms. The proposal, when it was accepted, would a significant affair, which involved 600 people from the outset and several hundred added along the way. Though Bering seems to have been primarily interested in landing in North America, he recognised the importance of secondary objectives: the list of which expanded rapidly under the guidance of planners Nikolai Fedorovich Golovin (head of the Admiralty); Ivan Kirilov, a highly ranked politician with an interest in geography, and Andrey Osterman, a close adviser of the new Empress, Anna Ivanovna. As Bering waited for Anna to solidify her grip on the throne, he and Kirilov worked to find a new, more dependable administrator to run Okhotsk and to begin work on improving the roads between Yakutsk and the coastal settlement. Their choice for the post of administrator, made remotely, was Grigory Skornyakov-Pisarev; possibly the least bad candidate, he would nevertheless turn out to be a poor choice. In any case, Skornyakov-Pisarev was ordered in 1731 to proceed to Okhotsk, with directions to expand it into a proper port. He did not leave for Okhotsk for another four years, by which time Bering's own expedition (in time for which Okhotsk was supposed to have been prepared) was not far off.

In 1732, however, Bering was still at the planning stage in Moscow, having taken a short leave of absence for St. Petersburg. The better positioned Kirilov oversaw developments, eyeing up not only the chance of discovering North America, but of mapping the whole Arctic coast, finding a good route south to Japan, landing on the Shantar Islands and even making contact with Spanish America. On 12 June the Senate approved resources to fund an academic contingent for the expedition, and three academics – Johann Georg Gmelin (a natural historian), Louis de l'Isle de la Croyère (an astronomer), and Gerhard Friedrich Müller (an anthropologist) – were selected by the Academy of Sciences. Proposals were made to transports goods or men to Kamchatka by sea via Cape Horn, but these were not approved. Other than a broad oversight role, Bering's personal instructions from the Admiralty were surprisingly simple. Given on 16 October 1732, they amounted only to recreating his first expedition, but with the added task of heading east and finding North America (a feat which had in fact just been completed by Mikhail Gvozdev, though this was not known at the time). The suggestion was made that Bering share more of his command with the Chirikov, suggesting that the 51-year-old Bering was slowly being edged out. Elsewhere, instructions were sent ahead to Yakutsk, Irkutsk and Okhotsk to aid Bering's second expedition – and thus, the naivety of the first expedition in assuming compliance was repeated. Further follies included plans to send ships north along the rivers Ob and Lena towards the Arctic.

==== St. Petersburg to Kamchatka ====
Spanberg left St. Petersburg in February 1733 with the first (small) detachment of the second expedition, bound for Okhotsk. Chirikov followed on 18 April with the main contingent (initially 500 people and eventually swelling to approximately 3000 after labourers were added). Following them, on 29 April Bering followed with Anna and their two youngest children – their two eldest, both sons, were left with friends in Reval. The academic contingent, including the three professors, left in August. Soon catching the main party, Bering and Chirikov led the group eastwards, descending on Tobolsk for the winter. The arrival of such a large party with such great demands – and so soon after Spanberg had made similar demands – put a strain on the town. Bering and a small advance party left Tobolsk in later February, stopping at Irkutsk to pick up gifts for the native tribes they would later encounter; it arrived at Yakutsk in August 1734. The main grouping, now under Chirikov's command left Tobolsk in May 1734, but had a more difficult trek and one which required harsh discipline be imposed to prevent desertions. Nonetheless, it arrived in Yakutsk in June 1735. Whilst Spanberg headed east to Okhotsk, Bering waited in Yakutsk where he partied for a long time, preparing two ships on the Lena (one would be captained by Vasili Pronchishchev and the other first by Peter Lassenius and later by Dmitry Laptev). Both were to sail northwards, and over the coming years to chart the Arctic coastline and to test whether it was navigable. Nevertheless, Bering soon found he was quickly bogged down in Yakutsk; two parties sent east to find a better route to the Okhotsk Sea were both failures (the second coming far closer than it realised), and yet this was information the expedition desperately needed. Bering decided to prepare a similar land route to the one he had used on the first expedition instead, constructing huts along the route in advance. It was work, however, that was still unfinished even by the summer of 1737, such were the delays.

At Okhotsk things were little better; it was "ill-suited to be a permanent port", and Skornyakov-Pisarev was slow to construct the buildings needed. Spanberg was, however, able to ready the ships the expedition needed. By the end of 1737 the St. Gabriel had been refitted; additionally, two new ships—the Archangel Michael (Архангел Михаил, Arkhangel Mikhail) and the Nadezhda (Надежда)—had been constructed and were rapidly readied for a voyage to Japan, a country with which Russia had never had contact. The same year, Bering took up residence in Okhotsk. It was the fifth year of the expedition, and the original costings now looked naive compared to the true costs of the trip. The additional costs (300,000 roubles compared to the 12,000 budgeted) brought poverty to the whole region. On 29 June 1738, Spanberg set off for the Kuril Islands with the three ships he had prepared. After he had left there were further delays, probably due to a lack of natural resources. Over the next three years, Bering himself was criticised on an increasingly regular basis (his salary had already been halved in 1737 when the originally planned four years ran out); the delays also caused friction between Bering, Chirikov (who felt unduly constrained) and Spanberg (who felt Bering was too weak in his dealings with the local peoples). The two key figures who had been so useful to Bering in St. Petersburg back in the early 1730s (Saunders and Kirilov) were now dead, and there were occasional moves to either terminate the expedition or to replace Bering. Meanwhile, a fourth ship, the Bolsheretsk (Большерецк) was constructed and Spanberg (having identified some 30 Kuril Islands on his first trip) led the four ships on a second voyage, which saw the first Russians land in Japan. In August 1740, with the main, America-bound expedition almost ready, Anna Bering returned to St. Petersburg with her and Vitus' younger children. Bering would never see his wife again. Those without places on a ship also began the long journey home. As they left, a messenger arrived; the admiralty was demanding a progress update. Bering delayed, promising a partial report from Spanberg and a fuller report later.

==== Sea voyage, death and achievements ====
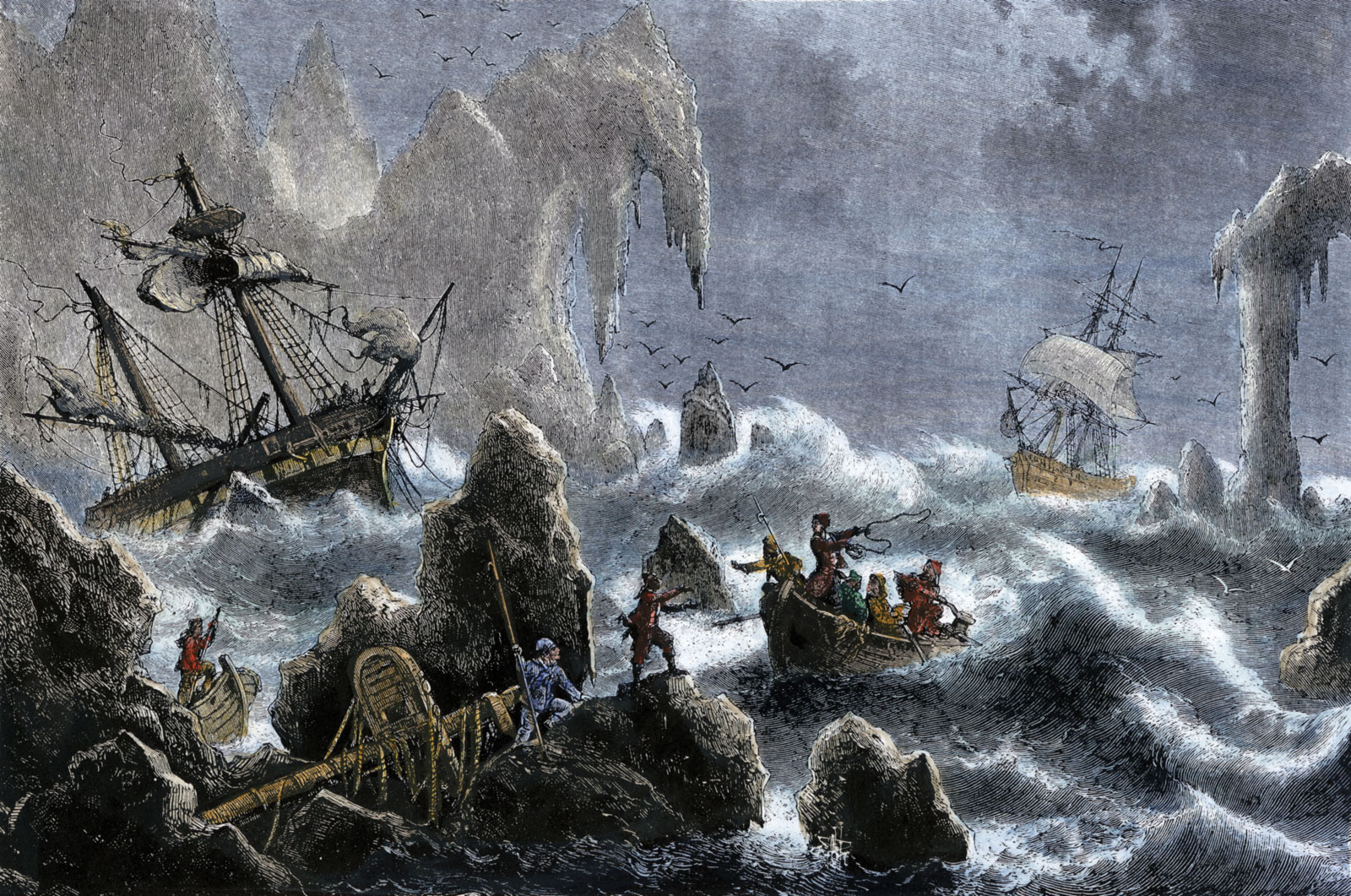
Vitus Bering's expedition being wrecked on the Aleutian Islands in 1741.

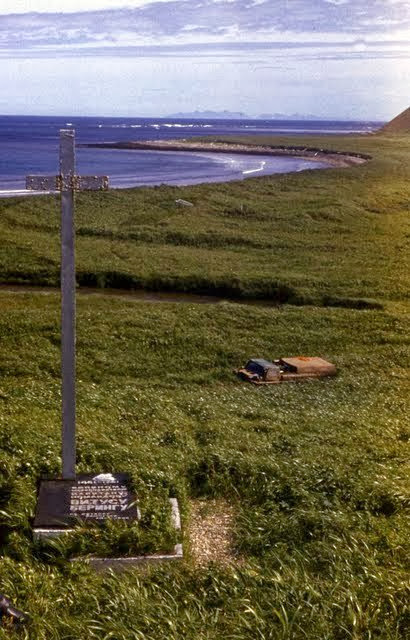
The grave of Vitus Bering on Bering Island

With time now of the essence, the Okhotsk (Охотск) left for Bolsheretsk, arriving there in mid-September. Another new ship, the St. Peter (Святой Пётр, Sviatoi Piotr, Pyotr, or Pëtr), captained by Bering, also left. It was accompanied by its sister creation the St. Paul (Святой Павел, Sviatoi Pavel) and the Nadezhda. Delayed by the Nadezhda's hitting a sand bank and then being beaten by a storm, such that it was forced to stay at Bolsheretsk, the two other ships arrived in their destination of Avacha Bay in south-eastern Kamchatka on 6 October. The foundation of Petropavlovsk-Kamchatsky, including warehouses, living quarters and a beacon had been built there on Bering's orders few months before, and now the explorer named the settlement after his vessels.

Over the winter, Bering recruited for the trip ahead naturalist Georg Steller and completed the report he had promised to send. At the same time, however, the murder of several Russians under Bering's command by native tribesmen prompted him to send armed men to the north, with orders not to use force if it could be avoided. Apparently it could not, because the detachment killed several native Koryaks in the settlement of Utkolotsk and enslaved the remainder, bringing them back south.

Steller was horrified to see the Koryaks tortured in search of the murderers. His ethical complaints, like Chirikov's more practical ones before him, were suppressed. From Petropavlovsk, Bering led his expedition towards North America in the spring of 1741.

The expedition spotted the volcano Mount Saint Elias on 16 July 1741, where it briefly landed. His objective complete, ill and exhausted, Bering turned ship and headed back towards port. The return journey then included the discovery of Kodiak Island. A storm separated the ships, but Bering sighted the southern coast of Alaska, and a landing was made at Kayak Island or in the vicinity.

Under the command of Aleksei Chirikov, the second ship discovered the shores of northwest America (Aleksander Archipelago of present-day Alaska). Steller ensured the voyage recorded the wildlife it encountered, discovering and describing several species of plant and animal native to the North Pacific and North America during the expedition (including the Steller sea cow and Steller's jay).

Bering himself was forced by adverse conditions to return, and he discovered some of the Aleutian Islands on his way back. One of the sailors died and was buried on one of these islands, and the group was named after him (as the Shumagin Islands). Suffering from scurvy like many of his crew, Bering steadily became too ill to command the ship, passing control to Sven Waxell.

Storms, however, meant that the crew of the St. Peter was soon driven to refuge on an uninhabited island in the Commander Islands group (Komandorskiye Ostrova) in the south-west Bering Sea. On 19 December 1741 Vitus Bering died on the uninhabited island near the Kamchatka Peninsula, which was later given the name Bering Island in his honour.

Like 28 men of his company, Bering's death was commonly assumed to have been the result of scurvy (although this has since been contested); (Note: The 1991 Russian-Danish expedition that exhumed Bering's remains also analyzed teeth and bones and concluded that he did not die from scurvy. Based on analyses made in Moscow and on Steller's original report, heart failure was the likely cause of death (Frost 2003).) certainly, it had afflicted him in the final months. The situation was still dire for Bering's expedition (now headed by Waxell), many of them, including Waxell, were still ill and the St. Peter was in poor condition.

By April 1742 the party had ascertained that they were on an island. They decided to construct a new vessel from the remnants of the ship in order to return home. By August it was ready, successfully reaching Avacha Bay later in the month. There, the party discovered that Chirikov had led a rescue mission during 1741 that came within miles of the stranded group. Out of 77 men aboard the St. Peter, only 46 survived the hardships of the expedition, which claimed its last victim just one day before coming into home port. Its builder, Starodubtsev, returned home with government awards and later built several other seaworthy ships.

Assessing the scale of Bering's achievements is difficult, given that he was neither the first Russian to sight North America (that having been achieved by Mikhail Gvozdev during the 1730s), nor the first Russian to pass through the strait which now bears his name (an honour which goes to the relatively unknown 17th-century expedition of Semyon Dezhnev). Reports from his second voyage were jealously guarded by the Russian administration, preventing Bering's story from being retold in full for at least a century after his death. Nonetheless, Bering's achievements, both as an individual explorer and as a leader of the second expedition, are regarded as substantial. Consequently, Bering's name has since been used for the Bering Strait (named by Captain James Cook despite knowledge of Dezhnev's earlier expedition), the Bering Sea, Bering Island, Bering Glacier and the Bering Land Bridge.

== See also ==
- Exploration of the Pacific
- Russian America
