= VIT =

VIT may refer to:

- Vitoria Airport (IATA code VIT; ICAO airport code LEVT), Vitoria-Gasteiz, Basque Country, Spain
- VIT University (disambiguation)
- Vancouver Island Trail
- Victorian Institute of Teaching
- Vellore Institute of Technology
- Vidyalankar Institute of Technology
- Vishwakarma Institute of Technology
- Viti language (ISO 639 code vit)
- Vertical Interval Timecode, video scanline timecode
- VIT signals (vertical interval test signal) in broadcast television
- VIT, C.A. (Venezolana de Industria Tecnológica, Compañía Anónima), a computer hardware manufacturer in Venezuela
- Vitalicio Seguros (UCI code VIT) pro-cycling team
- Polikarpov VIT, a series of Soviet ground-attack planes
  - Polikarpov VIT-1, Soviet ground-attack plane
  - Polikarpov VIT-2, Soviet ground-attack plane
- Vision transformer (ViT), a machine learning model
- Vaccine Injury Table, a component of the U.S. National Vaccine Injury Compensation Program

== See also ==
- Vit (disambiguation)
