= Vid (given name) =

Vid is a common Christian given name in Slovenia, Serbia and Croatia. It is the Slavic form of the Latin Vitus, the name of the Christian Saint Vitus.

Notable people with the name include:

- Vid Belec, Slovenian footballer
- Vid Cencic, Uruguayan cyclist
- Vid Fašaić, Croatian rower
- Vid Gutkeled, Hungarian courtier
- Vid Hidvégi, Hungarian artistic gymnast and pommel horse specialist
- Vid Hvaranin, bishop of Duvno from 1489 to 1507
- Vid Juricskay, Australian canoer
- Vid Kavtičnik, Slovenian handball player
- Vid Khissel (Veit Khisl), Slovenian politician
- Vid Milenkovic, Swiss basketball player
- Vid Morpurgo, Croatian industrialist, publisher, and politician
- Vid Pečjak, Slovenian psychologist
- Vid Poteko, Slovenian handball player
- Vid Vuletić Vukasović, Serbian ethnographer
- Petar Vid Gvozdanović (Peter Vitus von Quosdanovich), Austrian general
