= Vitt (surname) =

Vitt is a surname. Notable persons with that surname include:

- Ossie Vitt (1890–1963), American baseball player
- Dale Hadley Vitt (born 1944), American bryologist and ecologist
- Joe Vitt (born 1954), American coach in American Football
- Bill Vitt, American musician
- Yury Vitt (born 1980), Uzbekistani wrestler
