= Occasional song =

Song marking an occasion

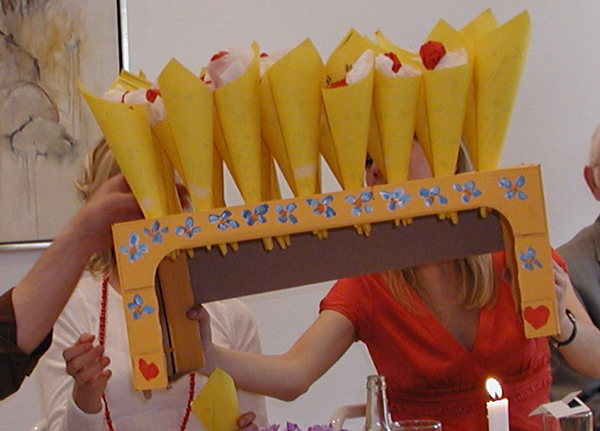
Lejlighedssange, wrapped as decorative cones, are distributed at a confirmation party.

An occasional song is a novelty song or ballad written and sung for a special occasion. Occasional songs were a cultural tradition throughout Europe and were often important in immigrant communities. In Denmark the tradition of the lejlighedssang has remained strong.

Occasional songs were once customary in many European cultures, and remained traditional in immigrant communities, for example those of Jews in America.

The Danish lejlighedssang remains a strong tradition, part of family celebrations, particularly during confirmation, wedding and anniversary parties. Participants write lyrics for the specific occasion composed upon a popular tune. Copies of the lyrics are written on decorative pages and distributed among the celebrants to be read and sung en masse. The tradition in Denmark dates back to the street ballads and political club songs of the late 1700s. Group singing became further integrated across Danish society by the influence of N. F. S. Grundtvig's national consciousness and public school movements in the mid-1800s. By post-World War II, the singing of lejlighedssange at celebrations was typical. According to Danish historians, the lejlighedssang persists in modern Danish culture as an important form of group bonding or fælleskab (togetherness).
