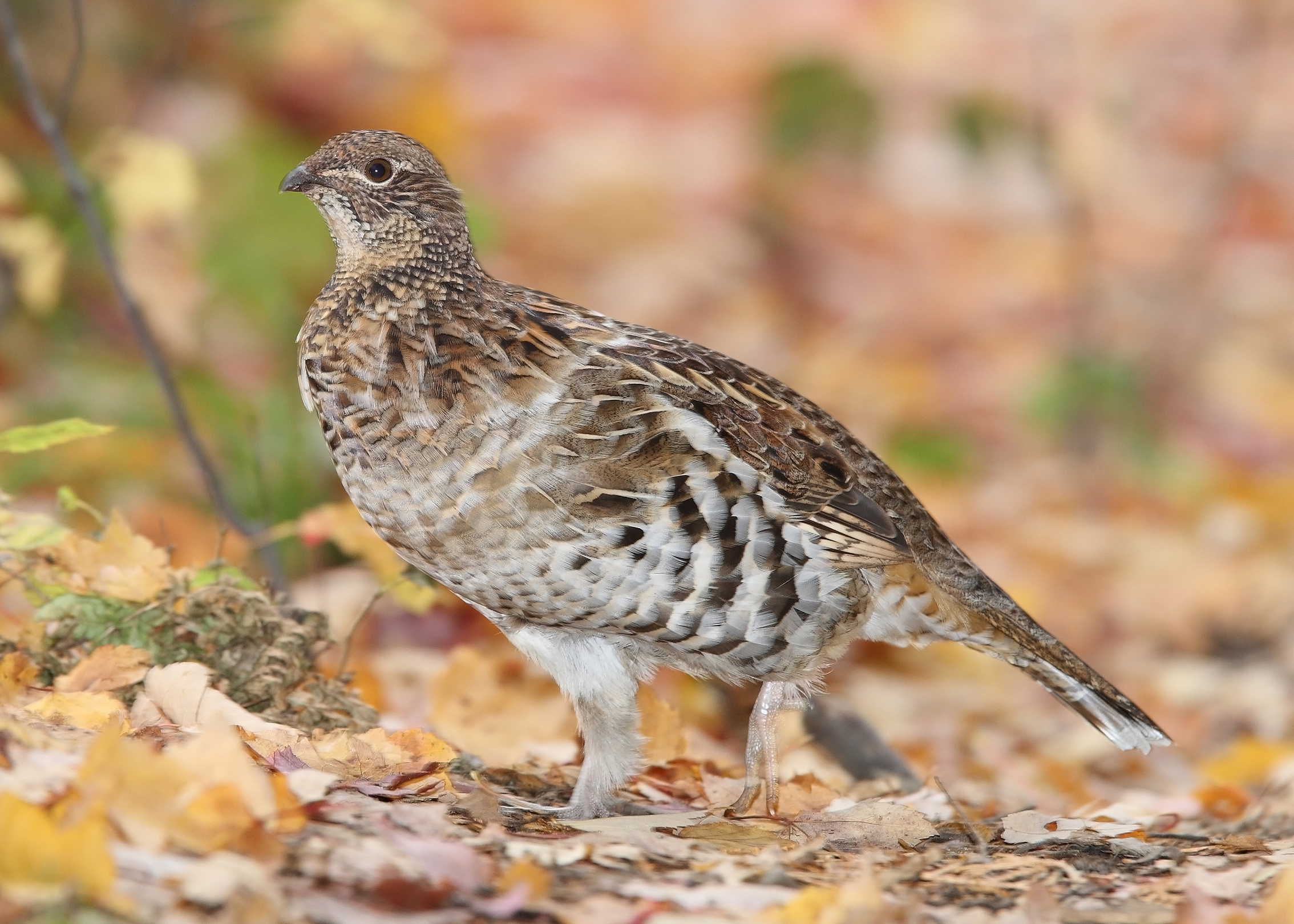
- Female at Algonquin Provincial Park in Ontario

Conservation status
- Least Concern (IUCN 3.1)

Scientific classification
- Kingdom: Animalia
- Phylum: Chordata
- Class: Aves
- Order: Galliformes
- Family: Phasianidae
- Tribe: Tetraonini
- Genus: Bonasa; Stephens, 1819
- Species: B. umbellus

Binomial name
- Bonasa umbellus (Linnaeus, 1766)
- resident range

Synonyms
- Tetrao umbellus Linnaeus, 1766

= Ruffed grouse =

Ruffed grouse Temporal range: Pleistocene–present
- Male courtship display in Elk Island National Park

Species of bird

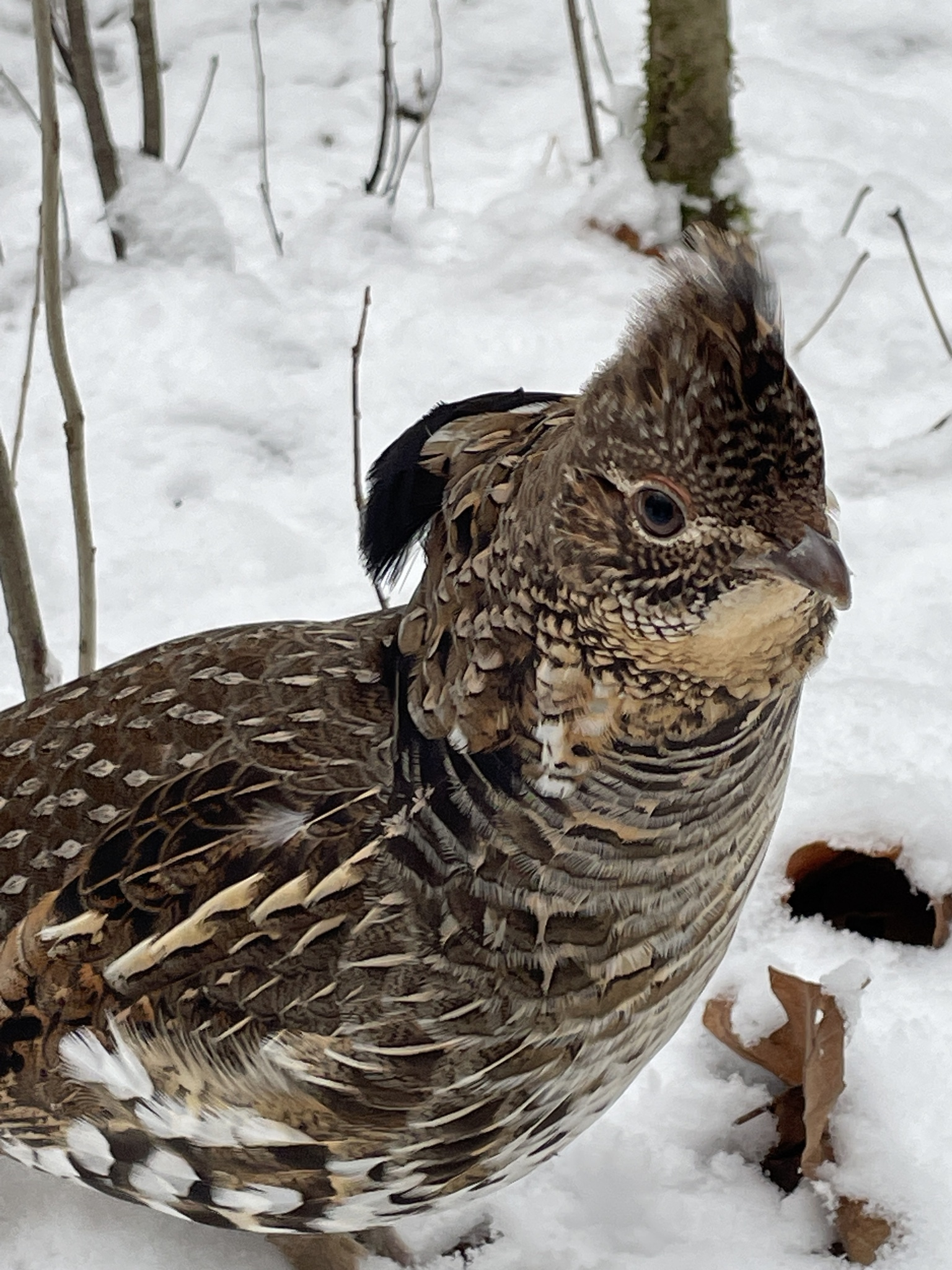
A male found at the Kortright Center for Conservation

The ruffed grouse (Bonasa umbellus) is a medium-sized grouse occurring in forests from the Appalachian Mountains across Canada to Alaska. It is the most widely distributed game bird in North America. It is not migratory. It is the only species in the genus Bonasa. The ruffed grouse is sometimes incorrectly referred to as a "partridge", an unrelated phasianid, and occasionally confused with the grey partridge, a bird of open areas rather than woodlands.

The ruffed grouse is the state game bird of Pennsylvania, United States.

== Taxonomy ==
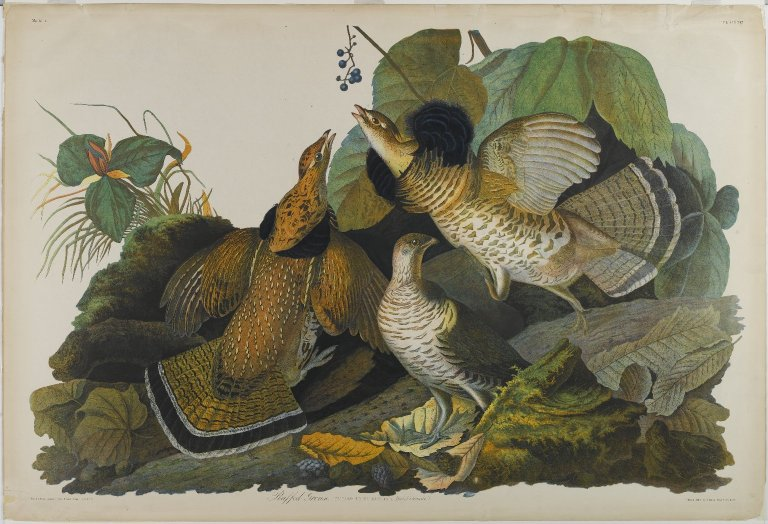
Ruffed Grouse by John J. Audubon c. 1861

Bonasa umbellus was first described by Carl Linnaeus in his 1766 12th edition of Systema Naturae. He classified it as Tetrao umbellus, placing it in a subfamily with Eurasian grouse. The genus Bonasa was applied by British naturalist John Francis Stephens in 1819. Ruffed grouse is the preferred common name because it applies only to this species. Misleading vernacular names abound, however, and it is often called partridge (sometimes rendered pa'tridge, or shortened to pat), pheasant, or prairie chicken, all of which are properly applied to other birds. Other nicknames for ruffed grouse include drummer or thunder-chicken.

The ruffed grouse has 13 recognized subspecies:

- B. u. brunnescens (Conover, 1935) - Vancouver Island (Canada)
- B. u. castanea (Aldrich & Friedmann, 1943) - Olympic Peninsula (USA)
- B. u. incana (Aldrich & Friedmann, 1943) - southeastern Idaho to central Utah (USA)
- B. u. labradorensis (Ouellet, 1991) - Labrador Peninsula (Canada)
- B. u. mediana (Todd, 1940) - north-central USA
- B. u. monticola (Todd, 1940) - central towards east-central USA
- B. u. obscura (Todd, 1947) - northern Ontario (Canada)
- B. u. phaios (Aldrich & Friedmann, 1943) - southeastern British Columbia (Canada) to south-central Idaho and eastern Oregon (USA)
- B. u. sabini (Douglas, 1829) - western coast of Canada and USA
- B. u. togata (Linnaeus, 1766) - north-central and northeastern USA and southeastern Canada
- B. u. umbelloides (Douglas, 1829) - southeastern Alaska (USA) through central Canada to central Oregon and northwestern Wyoming (USA)
- B. u. umbellus (Linnaeus, 1766) - east-central USA
- B. u. yukonensis (Grinnell, 1916) - Alaska (USA) and northwestern Canada

== Description ==
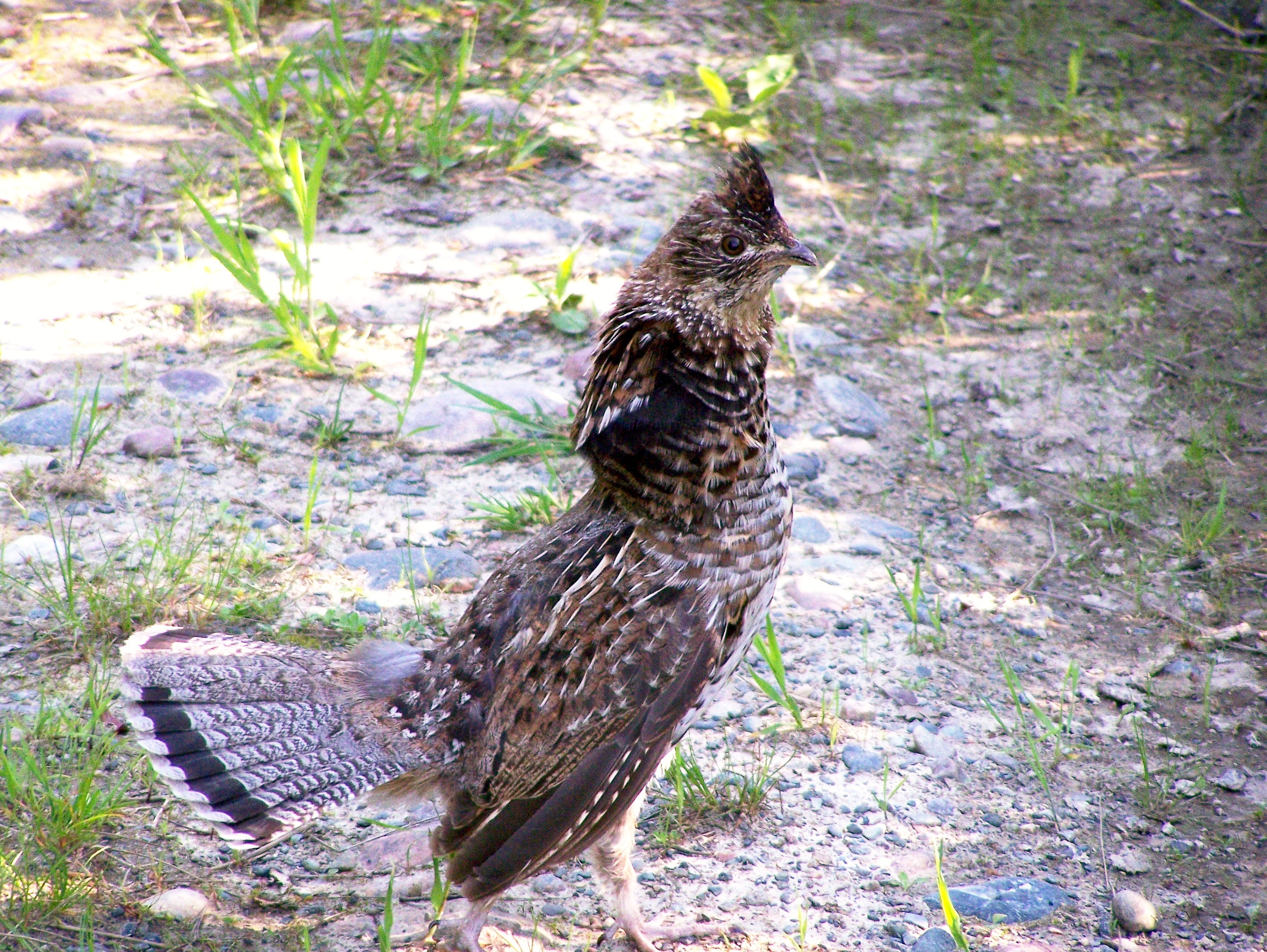
Grey morph

Ruffed grouse are chunky, medium-sized birds that weigh from 450–750 g (0.99–1.65 lb), measure from 40 to 50 cm (16 to 20 in) in length, and span 50–64 cm (20–25 in) across their short, strong wings. They have two distinct morphs - grey and brown. In the grey morph, the head, neck, and back are grey-brown; the breast is light with barring, with as much white on the underside and flanks. Overall, the birds have a variegated appearance; the throat is often distinctly lighter. The tail is essentially the same brownish grey, with regular barring and a broad black band near the end ("subterminal"). Brown-morph birds have tails of the same color and pattern. However, the rest of the plumage is much more brown, giving the appearance of a more uniform bird with less light plumage below and a conspicuously grey tail. All sorts of intergrades occur between the most typical morphs; warmer and more humid conditions favor browner birds in general.

Displaying male

The ruffs are on the sides of the neck in both sexes. They also have a crest on top of their head, which sometimes lies flat. Both sexes are similarly marked and sized, making them difficult to tell apart, even in hand. The female often has a broken subterminal tail band. At the same time, males tend to have unbroken tail bands, though the opposite of either can occur. Females may also do a display similar to the male. Another fairly accurate sign is that rump feathers with a single white dot indicate a female; rump feathers with more than one white dot indicate a male.

The average lifespan of a ruffed grouse is one year, although some birds are thought to live for as long as 11 years. Ruffed grouse are polygynous, and males may mate with several females during the breeding season.

== Ecology ==
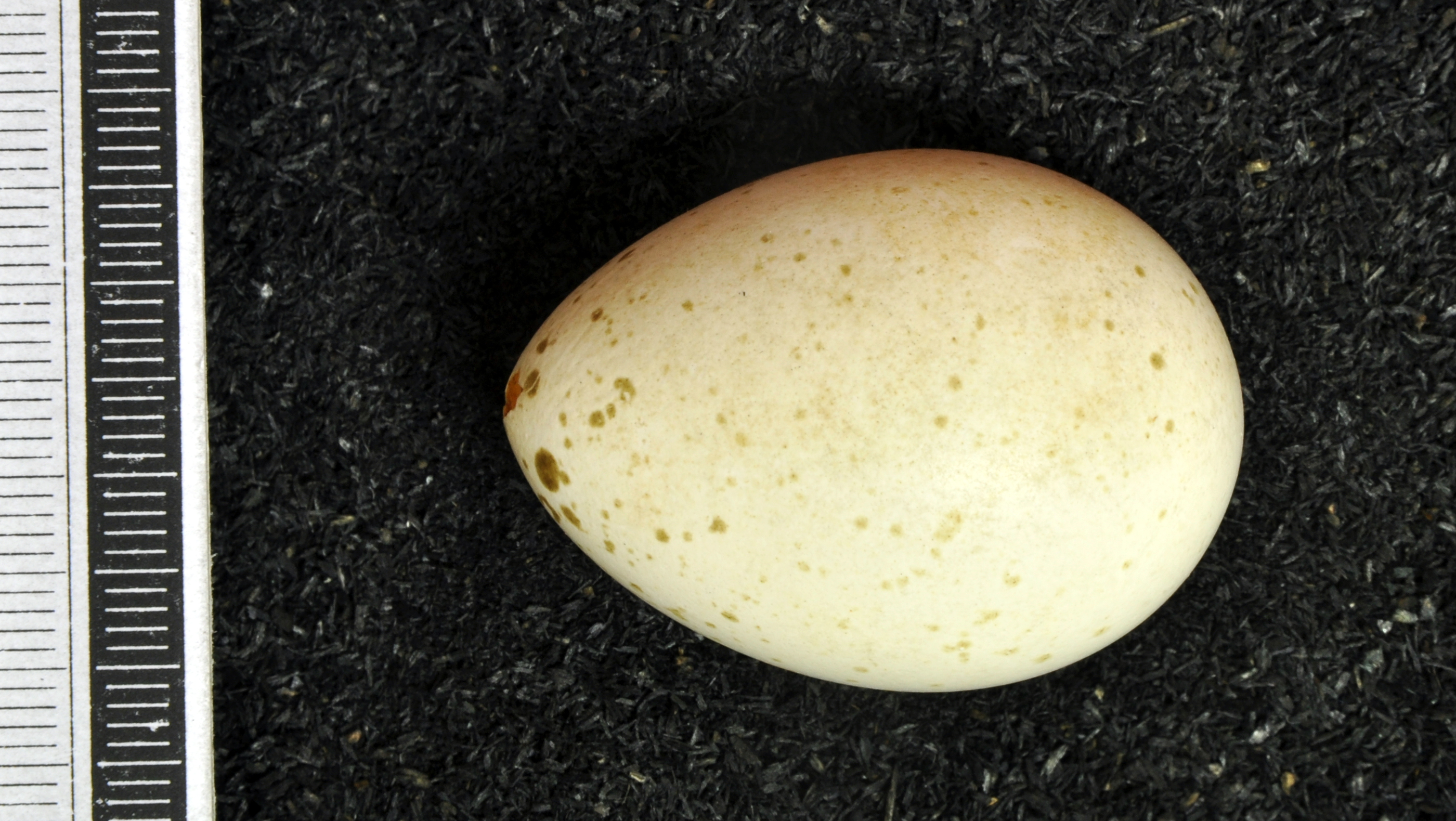
An egg

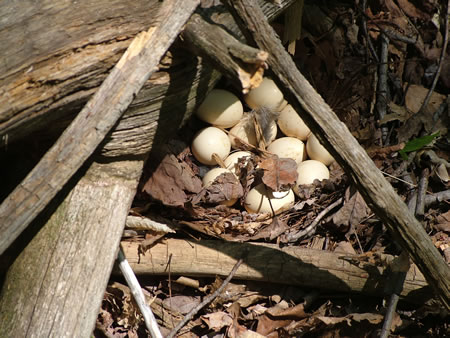
Nest with large clutch

Like most grouse, they spend most of their time on the ground; mixed woodland rich in aspen seems to be particularly well-liked. These birds forage on the ground or in trees. They are omnivores, eating buds, leaves, berries, seeds, and insects. According to nature writer Don L. Johnson:

More than any other characteristic, it is the ruffed grouse's ability to thrive on a wide range of foods that has allowed it to adapt to such a wide and varied range of habitat on this continent. A complete menu of grouse fare might itself fill a book. One grouse crop yielded a live salamander in a salad of watercress. Another contained a small snake.

== Behavior ==
Drumming sound, Yellowstone

Ruffed grouse call

The ruffed grouse differs from other grouse species in its courtship display. The ruffed grouse relies entirely on a nonvocal, acoustic display, known as drumming, unlike other grouse species. The drumming itself is a rapid, wing-beating display that creates a low-frequency sound, starting slow and speeding up (thump ... thump ... thump..thump-thump-thump-thump). Even in thick woods, this can be heard for a quarter-mile (400 m) or more.

The ruffed grouse spends most of its time quietly on the ground, and when surprised, may explode into flight, beating its wings very loudly. It will burrow into the snow for warmth in the winter and may suddenly burst out of the snow when approached too closely.

The male grouse proclaims his territory by engaging in a "drumming" display. This sound is made by beating his wings against the air to create a vacuum. It usually stands on a log, stone, or mound of soil when drumming. It does not strike the log to make the noise, it only uses the "drumming log" as a sort of stage.

The ruffed grouse population has a cycle, and follows the cycle no matter how much or how little hunting occurs. The cycle has puzzled scientists for years, and is simply referred to as the "grouse cycle".

In spite of this historical cycle, populations have been declining in Pennsylvania and management plans adopted. Habitat loss has been a concern for the species, but the introduction of the West Nile virus has been seen to be further increasing mortality.

=== Breeding ===
The nest is a bowl-shaped depression on the forest floor. The number of eggs per clutch ranges from 9 to 14, each measuring 3.78–4.14 cm (1.49–1.63 in) in length and 2.9–3 cm (1.1–1.2 in) in width.
