= Georg Wilhelm Steller =

German biologist and explorer (1709–1746)

- Born: 10 March 1709; Bad Windsheim, Holy Roman Empire
- Died: 14 November 1746 (aged 37); Tyumen, Siberia Governorate, Russian Empire
- Education: University of Halle

Georg Wilhelm Steller (10 March 1709 – 14 November 1746) was a German-born naturalist and explorer who contributed to the fields of biology, zoology, and ethnography. He participated in the Great Northern Expedition (1733–1743) and his observations of the natural world helped the exploration and documentation of the flora and fauna of the North Pacific region.

Steller pursued studies in theology and medicine before turning his attention to the natural sciences. In 1734, he joined the Russian Academy of Sciences as a physician, eventually being selected to accompany Bering's expedition to the uncharted waters between Siberia and North America. Steller kept detailed records of species and cultures encountered, as well as ocean currents during the journey.

Steller discovered many new species, as he documented numerous plants and animals, many of which were previously unknown to Western science. Notable among his discoveries was the Steller's sea cow and Steller's sea eagle. His exploration of the Kamchatka Peninsula and the Commander Islands significantly expanded scientific knowledge about the region's biodiversity.

== Biography ==
Early Life

Steller was born in Windsheim, near Nuremberg in Germany, the son of a Lutheran cantor, Johann Jakob Stöhler (after 1715, Georg changed his last name to be Steller to accommodate with Russian pronunciation), and studied at the University of Wittenberg. He then traveled to Russia as a physician on a troop ship returning home with the wounded. He arrived in Russia in November 1734. He met the naturalist Daniel Gottlieb Messerschmidt (1685–1735) at the Imperial Academy of Sciences. Two years after Messerschmidt's death, Steller married his widow and acquired notes from his travels in Siberia not handed over to the Academy.

Expeditions

Steller knew about Vitus Bering's Second Kamchatka Expedition, which had left Saint Petersburg in February 1733. He volunteered to join it and was accepted. He then left St Petersburg in January 1738 with his wife, who decided to stay in Moscow and go no farther. Steller met Johann Georg Gmelin in Yeniseisk in January 1739. Gmelin recommended that Steller take his place in the planned exploration of Kamchatka. Steller embraced that role and finally reached Okhotsk and the main expedition in March 1740 as Bering's ships, the St. Peter and St. Paul, were nearing completion.

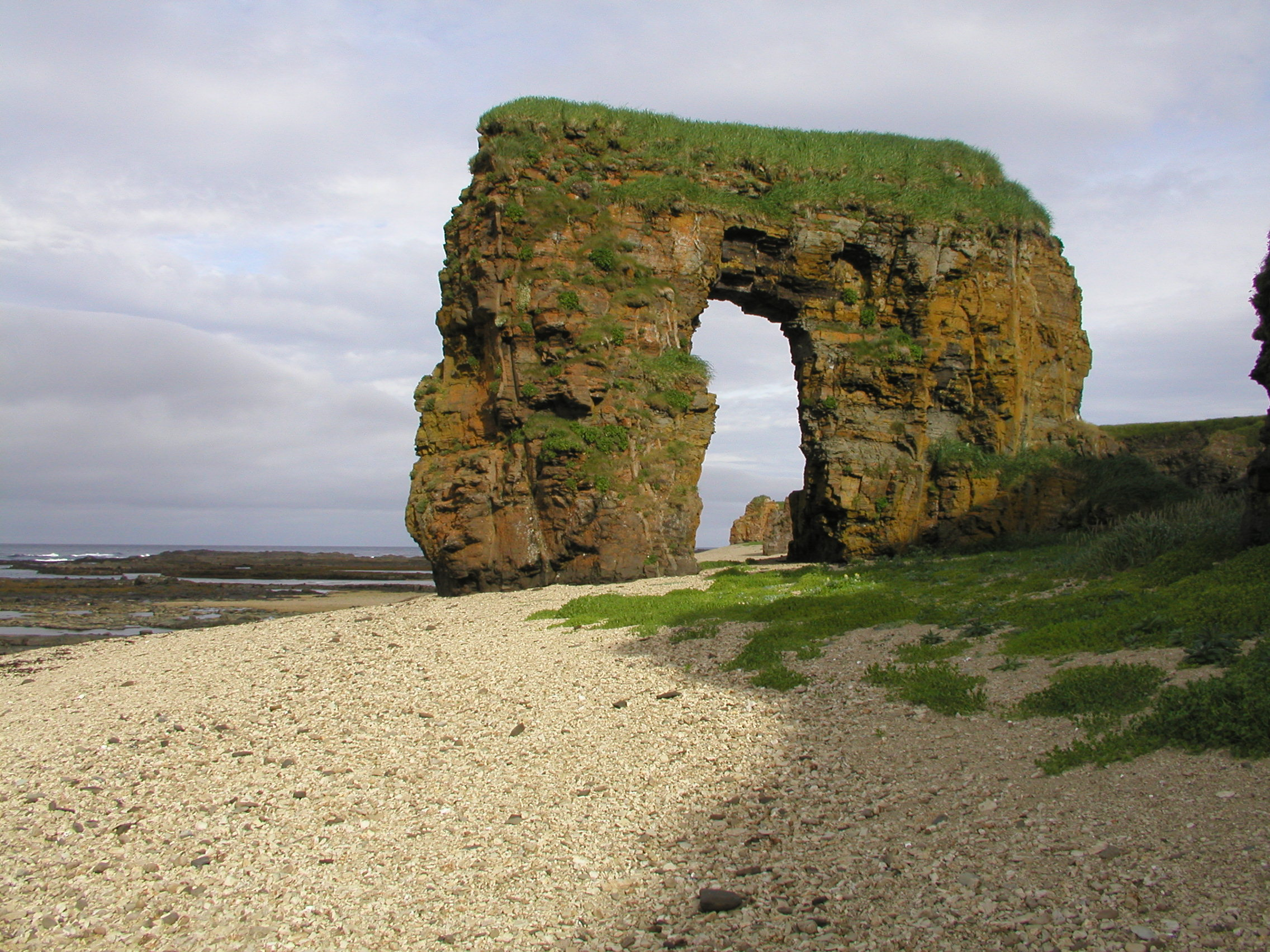
Steller's Arch on Bering Island

In September 1740, the expedition sailed to the Kamchatka Peninsula with Bering and his two expeditionary vessels sailing around the peninsula's south tip and up to Avacha Bay on the Pacific coast. Steller went ashore on the east coast of Kamchatka to spend the winter in Bolsherechye, where he helped to organize a local school and began exploring Kamchatka. When Bering summoned him to join the voyage in search of America and the strait between the two continents, serving in the role of scientist and physician, Steller crossed the peninsula by dog sled. After Bering's St. Peter was separated from its sister ship the St. Paul in a storm, Bering continued to sail east, expecting to find land soon. Steller, reading sea currents and flotsam and wildlife, insisted they should sail northeast. After considerable time lost, they turned northeast and made landfall in Alaska at Kayak Island on Monday 20 July 1741. Bering wanted to stay only long enough to take on fresh water. Steller argued Captain Bering into giving him more time for land exploration and was granted 10 hours. During his ten hours on land Steller noted the mathematical ratio of 10 years preparation for ten hours of investigation.

While the crew never even set foot on the mainland, Georg Steller is credited with being one of the first non-natives to have set foot upon Alaskan soil. The expedition never made mainland landfall because of a stubbornness and a "dull fear". They left with only a sketch of what they think the mainland would look like. On a remarkable journey, Steller became the first European naturalist to describe a number of North American plants and animals, including a jay later named Steller's jay.

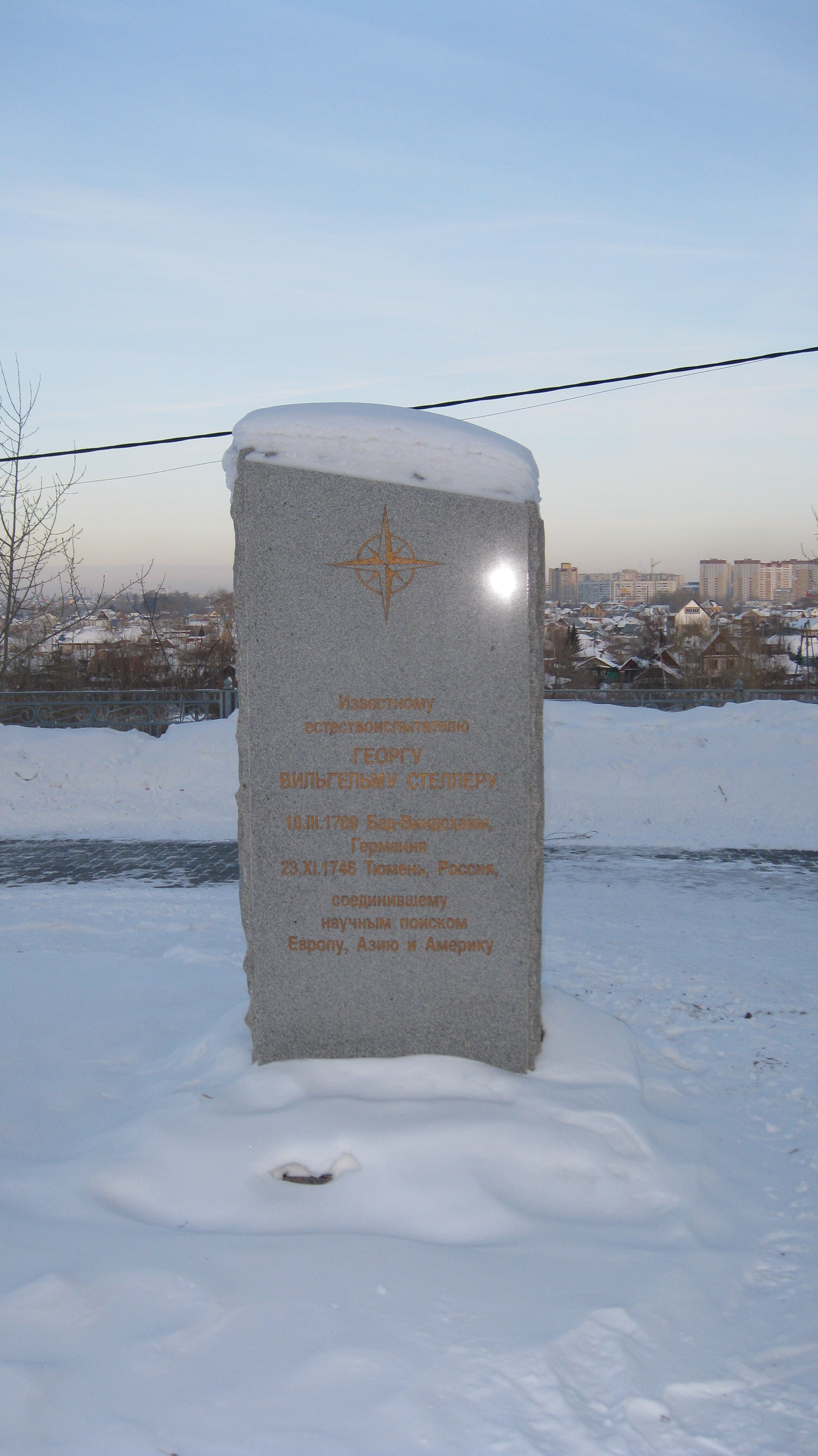
A 2009 memorial to Steller in a riverside park in Tyumen, Siberia, where he had died of fever at age 37.

Although Steller tried to treat the crew's growing scurvy epidemic with leaves and berries he had gathered, officers scorned his proposal. Steller and his assistant were some of the very few who did not suffer from the ailment. On the return journey, with only 12 members of the crew able to move and the rigging rapidly failing, the expedition was shipwrecked on what later became known as Bering Island. Almost half of the crew had perished from scurvy during the voyage. Steller nursed the survivors, including Bering, but he could not be saved and died. The remaining men made camp with little food or water, a situation made only worse by frequent raids by Arctic foxes. The crew hunted sea otters, sea lions, fur seals and sea cows to survive the winter.

In early 1742, the crew used salvaged material from the St. Peter to construct a new vessel to return to Avacha Bay and nicknamed it The Bering. Steller spent the next two years exploring the Kamchatka peninsula. He was falsely accused of freeing Kamchadal rebels from prison by a jealous rival and recalled to St. Petersburg. At one point he was put under arrest and made to return to Irkutsk for a hearing. He was freed and again turned west toward St. Petersburg, but along the way he came down with a fever and died at Tyumen.

Some of his journals, which reached the academy and were later published by Peter Simon Pallas, were used by other explorers of the North Pacific, including Captain Cook. There is also a journal of Steller's published by Stanford University Press that is titled Journal of a Voyage with Bering, 1741-1742, which has detailed accounts of the Second Kamchatka Expedition or the Great Northern Expedition.

Scientific Contributions

Of the six species of birds and mammals that Steller discovered during the voyage, two are extinct (Steller's sea cow and the spectacled cormorant) and three are near threatened and vulnerable (Steller sea lion, Steller's eider and Steller's sea eagle). The sea cow, in particular, a massive northern relative of the dugong, lasted only 27 years after Steller discovered and named it. The sea cow had a limited population that quickly became victim of overhunting by the Russian crews that followed in Bering's wake.

Steller's jay is one of the few species named after Steller that is not currently listed as endangered. In his brief encounter with the bird, Steller was able to deduce that the jay was kin to the American blue jay, a fact which seemed proof that Alaska was indeed part of North America.

Despite the hardships the crew endured, Steller studied the flora, fauna, and topography of the island in great detail. Of particular note were the only detailed behavioral and anatomical observations of Steller's sea cow, a large sirenian mammal that once ranged across the Northern Pacific during the Ice Ages, but whose surviving relict population was confined to the shallow kelp beds around the Commander Islands, and which was driven to extinction within 30 years of discovery by Europeans.

Based on these and other observations, Steller later wrote De Bestiis Marinis ('On the Beasts of the Sea'), describing the fauna of the island, including the northern fur seal, the sea otter, Steller sea lion, Steller's sea cow, Steller's eider and the spectacled cormorant. Steller claimed the only recorded sighting of the marine cryptid Steller's sea ape.

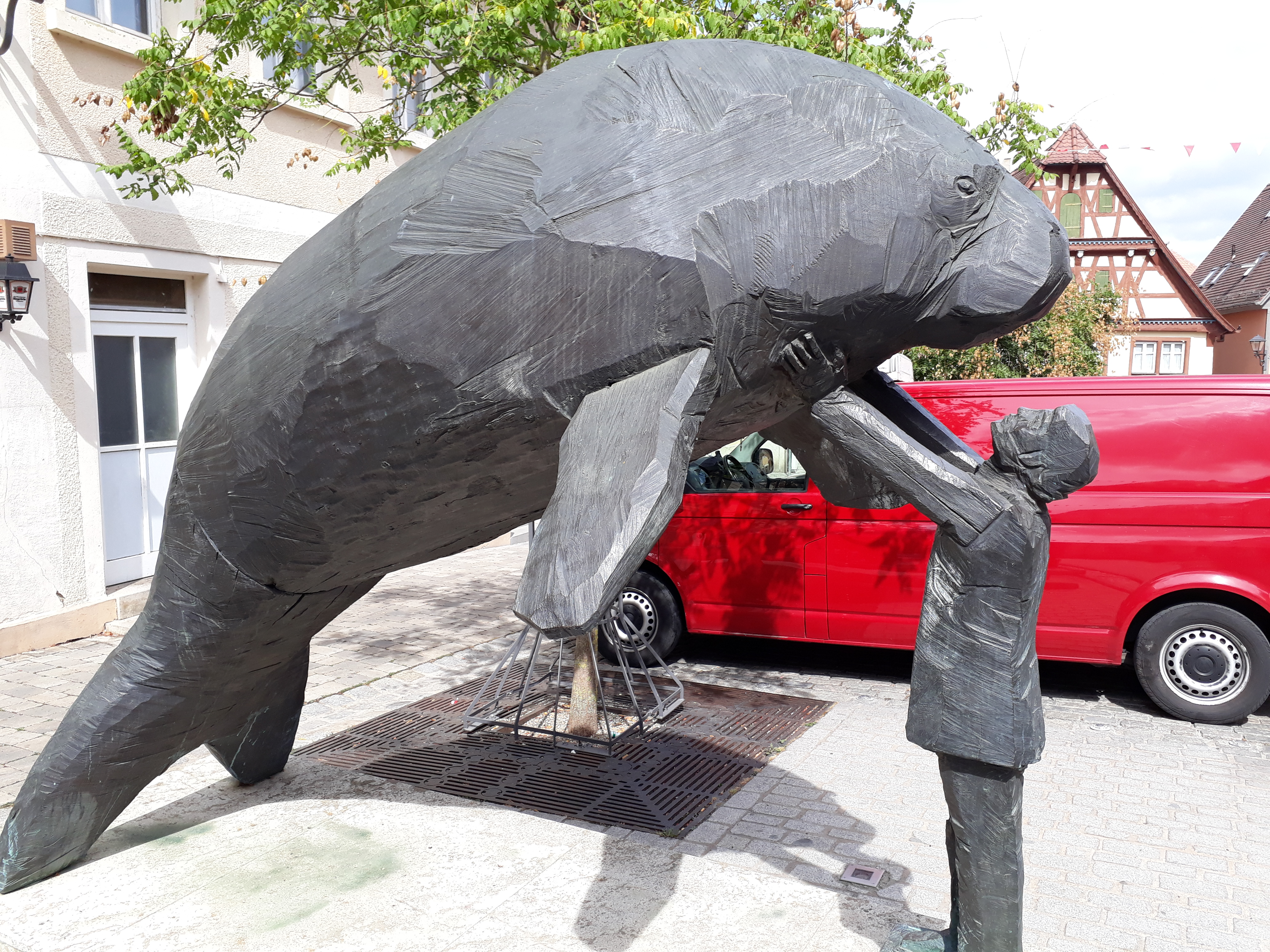
A statue in Bad Windsheim commemorating Georg Wilhelm Steller

== Discoveries and namesakes ==
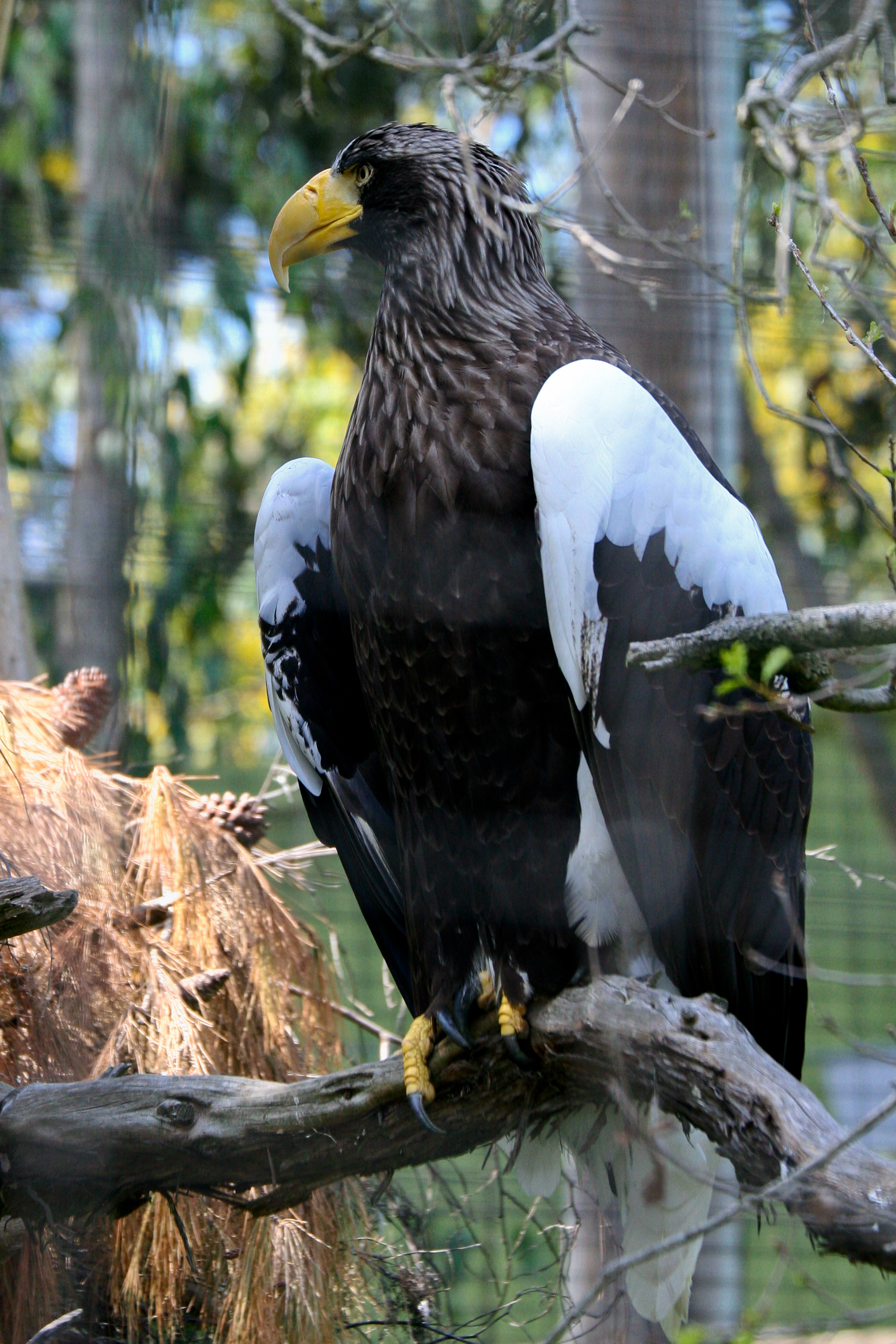
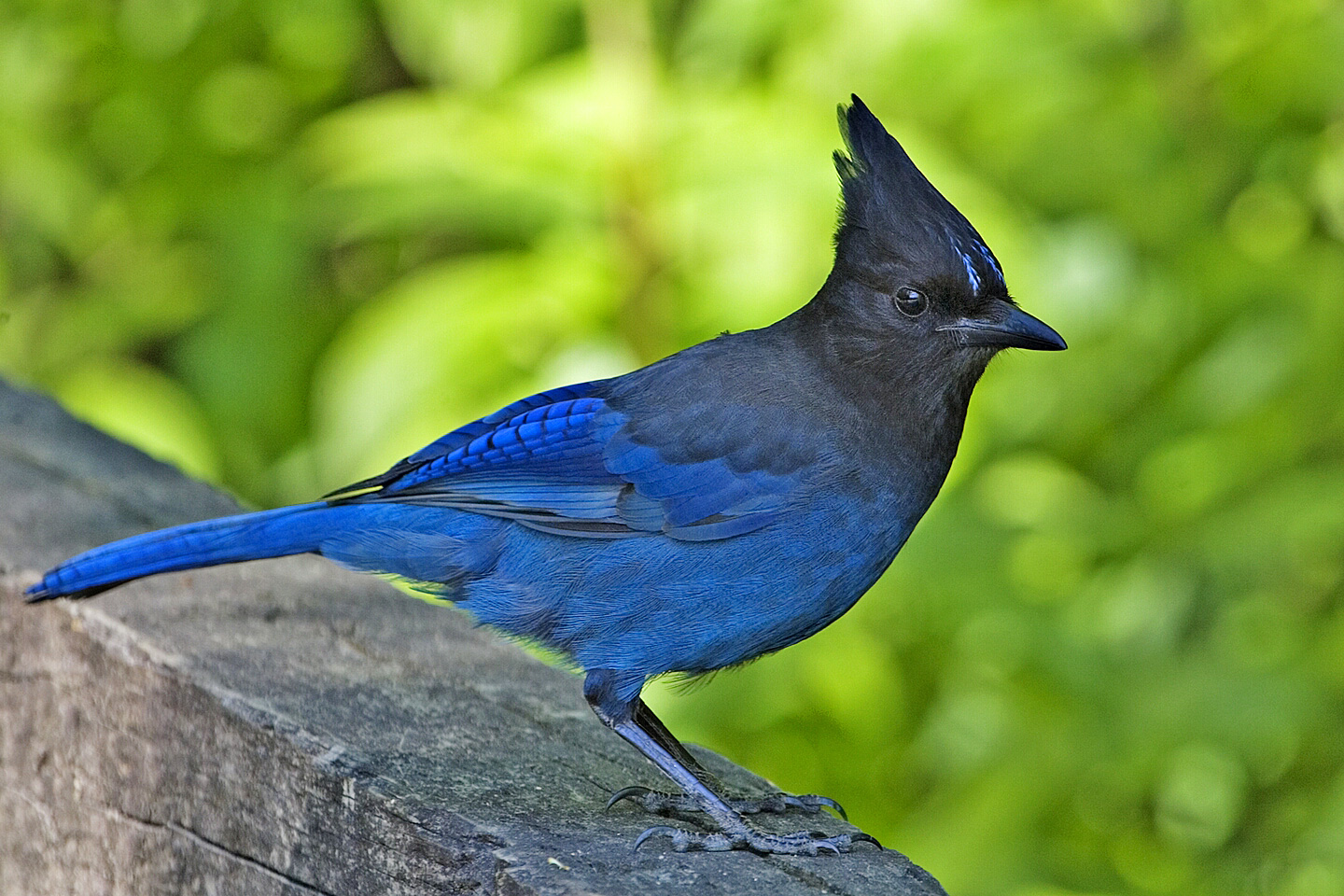
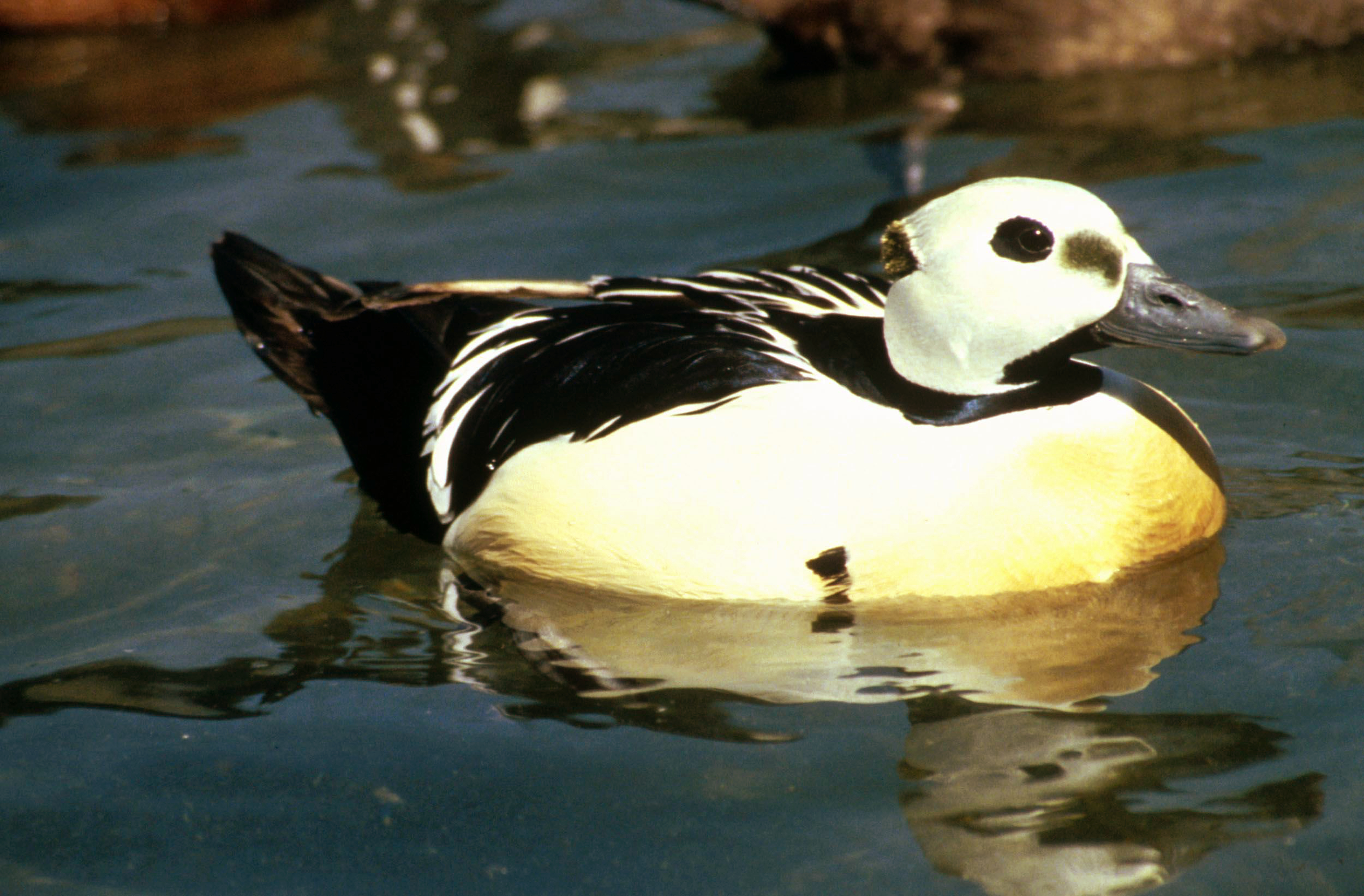
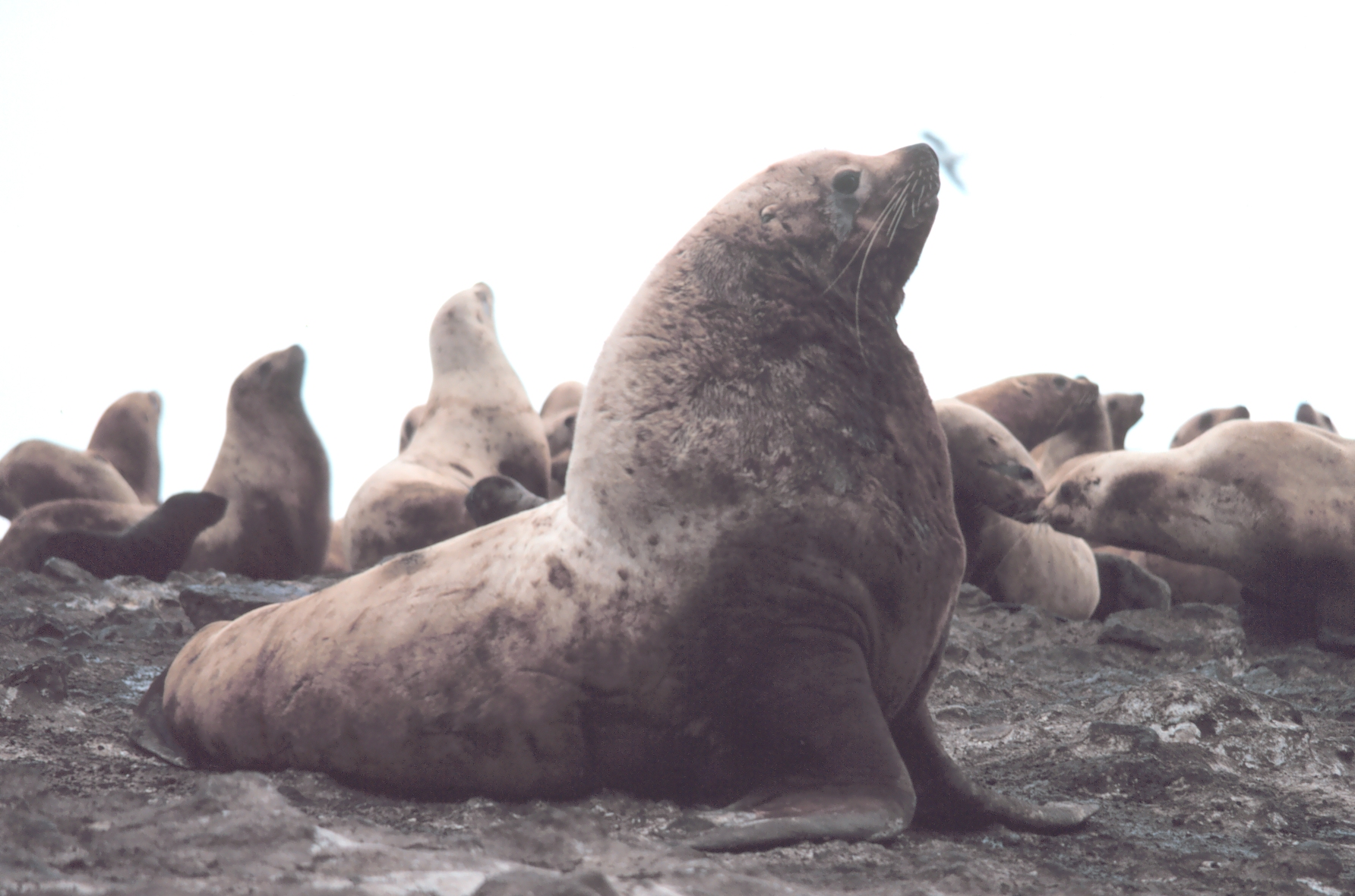
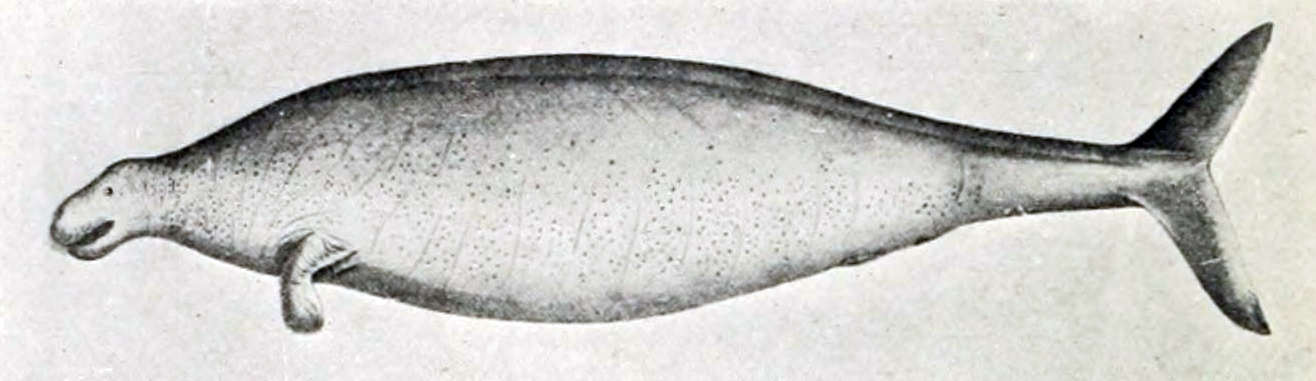
Several animals described by and named for Georg Steller.
- Top: Steller's sea eagle · Steller's jay
- Middle: Steller's eider · Steller sea lion
- Bottom: Steller's sea cow (extinct; sketch by J. F. Brandt)

Georg Steller described a number of animals and plants, some of which bear his name, either in the common name or scientific:

- Steller's eider (Polysticta stelleri)
- Steller's jay (Cyanocitta stelleri)
- Sea otter (Enhydra lutris)
- Steller's sea eagle (Haliaeetus pelagicus)
- Short-tailed albatross or Steller's albatross (Phoebastria albatrus)
- Steller's sea cow (Hydrodamalis gigas)
- Steller sea lion (Eumetopias jubatus)
- Steller's sculpin (Myoxocephalus stelleri)
- Gumboot chiton (Cryptochiton stelleri)
- Hoary mugwort (Artemisia stelleriana)
- Stellera L. (Thymelaeaceae)
- Stellerite (a mineral in the zeolite group)
- Restella Pobed. (Thymelaeaceae)

Steller Secondary School in Anchorage, Alaska is named for Steller, as is Mount Steller at 58°25′47″N 154°23′29″W.

== Popular culture ==
- In The Great North episode "Xmas With the Skanks Adventure" (s3e10 debuted 11 December 2022), Moon Tobin names a reindeer he finds "Wilhelm" after the zoologist
- T. Edward Bak's graphic novel Wild Man - vol. 1: Island of Memory: The Natural History of Georg Wilhelm Steller (Floating World Comics, Portland, OR, 2013; ISBN 978-0-9886624-4-5) tells the story of Steller's journeys north and intertwines his social connections and context.
- Vorda, Allan. Kamchatka Khronicle. mellemgaard.

== Works ==
- Stellers, Georg Wilhelm (1751). "De Bestiis Marinis". Novi Commentarii Academiae Scientiarum Imperialis Petropolitanae (in Latin). 2: 289–398.
- Stellers, Georg Wilhelm (1753). Georg Wilhelm Stellers ausführliche Beschreibung von sonderbaren Meerthieren, mit Erläuterungen und Nöthigen Kupfern versehen (in German). Halle: In Verlag Carl Christian Kümmel. doi:10.5962/bhl.title.119923.
- Steller, Georg Wilhelm (1988). Journal of a Voyage with Bering, 1741-1742. Stanford University Press.

== Sources ==
- "Стеллер, Георгий" . Brockhaus and Efron Encyclopedic Dictionary (in Russian). 1906.
