= Don Johnson (disambiguation) =

Don Johnson (born 1949) is an American actor.

Don or Donald Johnson may also refer to:

== Sports ==
- Don Johnson (second baseman) (1911–2000), American baseball player
- Don Johnson (American football) (1920–1965), American football center and linebacker
- Don Johnson (skier) (1922–1951), American Olympic skier
- Don Johnson (pitcher) (1926–2015), American baseball player
- Don Johnson (basketball) (1930–2019), American basketball player and coach
- Don Johnson (sports executive) (1930–2012), Canadian sports executive and president of the Canadian Amateur Hockey Association
- Don Johnson (bowler) (1940–2003), American ten-pin bowler
- Donald Johnson (born 1968), American tennis player
- Donald Johnson (javelin thrower) (born 1914), American javelin thrower, 3rd at the 1936 USA Outdoor Track and Field Championships

== Politicians and diplomats ==
- Donald Johnson (British politician) (1903–1978), British Member of Parliament
- Don Johnson Jr. (born 1948), U.S. Congressman from Georgia
- Donald C. Johnson (born 1949), American diplomat
- Don Johnson (politician), American politician from Oklahoma
- Don Johnson, Deputy Treasurer of Pennsylvania under R. Budd Dwyer

== Other people ==
- Donald E. Johnson (1924–1999), American businessman and government official
- Don L. Johnson (1927–2006), American writer
- Donald B. Johnson (1933–1994), American computer scientist
- Donald K. Johnson (born 1935), Canadian philanthropist
- Don Johnson (gambler) (born 1962), American blackjack player
- Donald Johnson, English musician and member of Manchester band A Certain Ratio

== See also ==
- Don Johnson Big Band, a Finnish band
- Don Johnson Cup, the Junior “B” ice hockey championship for the Atlantic Provinces of Canada
- Donald Johnston (disambiguation)
