= Sea ape =

Sea ape may refer to:

- Steller's sea ape, a purported marine mammal observed in 1741
- Common thresher, a large species of thresher shark
