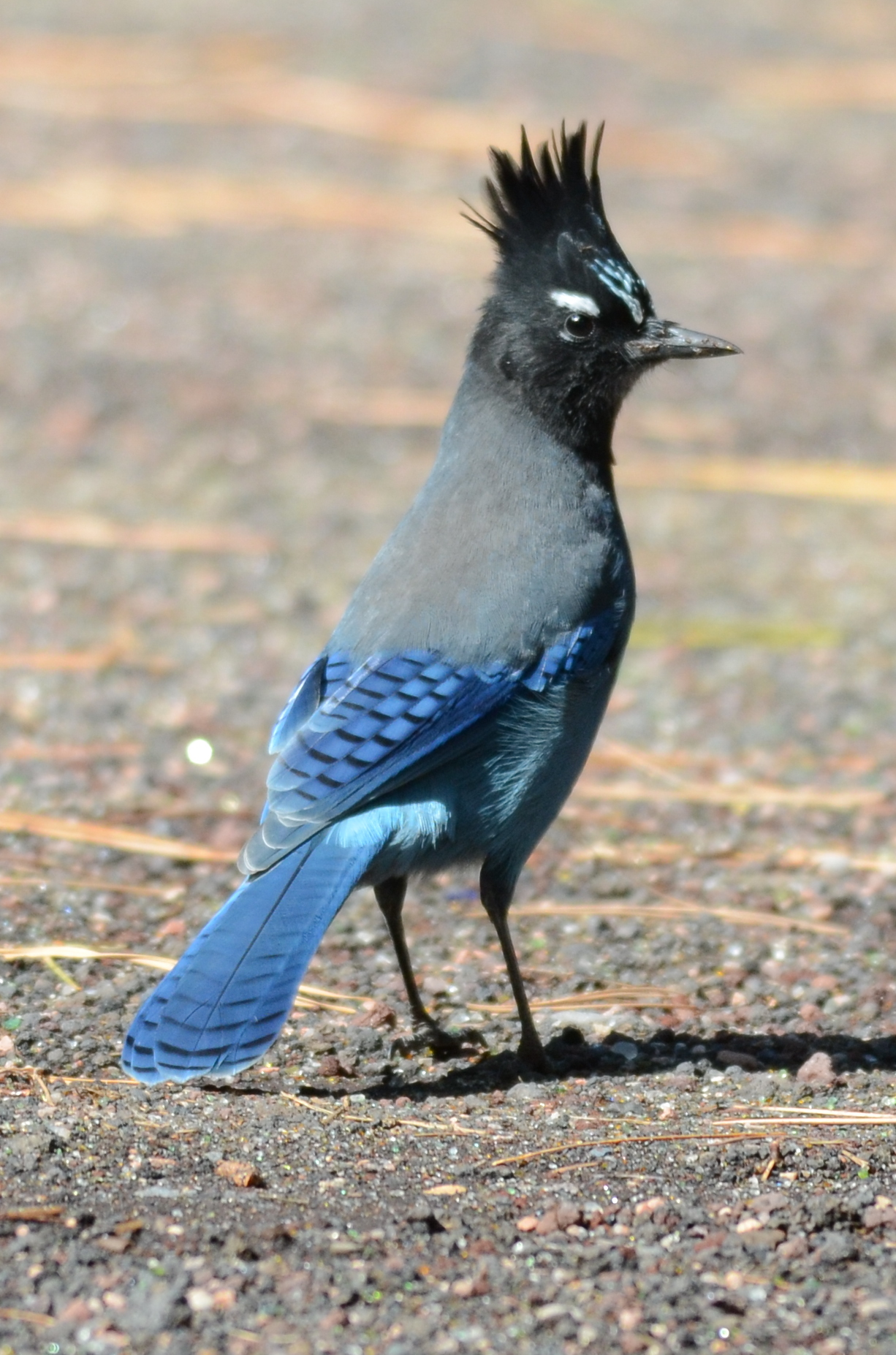
- Steller's jay in Flagstaff, Arizona, with white head-markings typical of eastern-variety birds (C. s. macrolopha)

Conservation status
- Least Concern (IUCN 3.1)

Scientific classification
- Kingdom: Animalia
- Phylum: Chordata
- Class: Aves
- Order: Passeriformes
- Family: Corvidae
- Genus: Cyanocitta
- Species: C. stelleri

Binomial name
- Cyanocitta stelleri (Gmelin, JF, 1788)

Audio

= Steller's jay =

Species of bird found in western North America

Steller's jay (Cyanocitta stelleri) is a bird native to western North America and the mountains of Central America, closely related to the blue jay (C. cristata) found in eastern North America. It is the only crested jay west of the Rocky Mountains. It is also sometimes colloquially called a "blue jay" in the Pacific Northwest, but is distinct from the blue jay of eastern North America. The species inhabits pine-oak and coniferous forests.

== Taxonomy ==
Steller's jay was formally described in 1788 by the German naturalist Johann Friedrich Gmelin in his revised and expanded edition of Carl Linnaeus's Systema Naturae. He placed it with the crows in the genus Corvus and coined the binomial name Corvus stelleri. Gmelin based his account on "Stellers crow" that had been described in 1781 by the English ornithologist John Latham in his book A General Synopsis of Birds. Latham had examined a specimen belonging to the naturalist Joseph Banks that had been collected in Nootka Sound, Vancouver Island off the Pacific coast of Canada. The specimen was one of the birds collected on Captain James Cook's third voyage to the Pacific Ocean. During this voyage Cook visited Nootka Sound from 29 March until 26 Apr 1778. Steller's jay is now placed with the blue jay in the genus Cyanocitta that was introduced in 1845 by the English ornithologist Hugh Strickland.

The bird is named after the German naturalist Georg Wilhelm Steller, the first European to record them, in 1741.

=== Subspecies ===
Thirteen subspecies are recognized:

Image	Subspecies	Distribution
	C. s. stelleri (Gmelin, JF, 1788)	south Alaska and coastal west Canada to northwest Oregon (northwest USA)
	C. s. carlottae Osgood, 1901	Haida Gwaii (off west Canada)
	C. s. frontalis (Ridgway, 1873)	central Oregon, east California to central west Nevada (west USA)
	C. s. carbonacea Grinnell, 1900	coastal central west California (west USA)
	C. s. annectens (Baird, SF, 1874)	central British Columbia to southeast Alberta (southwest Canada) south to northeast Oregon and northwest Wyoming (northwest USA)
	C. s. macrolopha Baird, SF, 1854	east Nevada to southwest South Dakota (central west USA) south to north Mexico
	C. s. diademata (Bonaparte, 1850)	Arizona to northwest Mexico
	C. s. phillipsi Browning, 1993	mainly San Luis Potosí (central Mexico)
	C. s. azteca Ridgway, 1899	central south Mexico
	C. s. coronata (Swainson, 1827)	southwest, central east, south Mexico and west Guatemala
	C. s. purpurea Aldrich, 1944	Michoacán (southwest Mexico)
	C. s. restricta Phillips, AR, 1966	Oaxaca (south Mexico)
	C. s. suavis Miller, W & Griscom, 1925	Nicaragua and Honduras

== Description ==
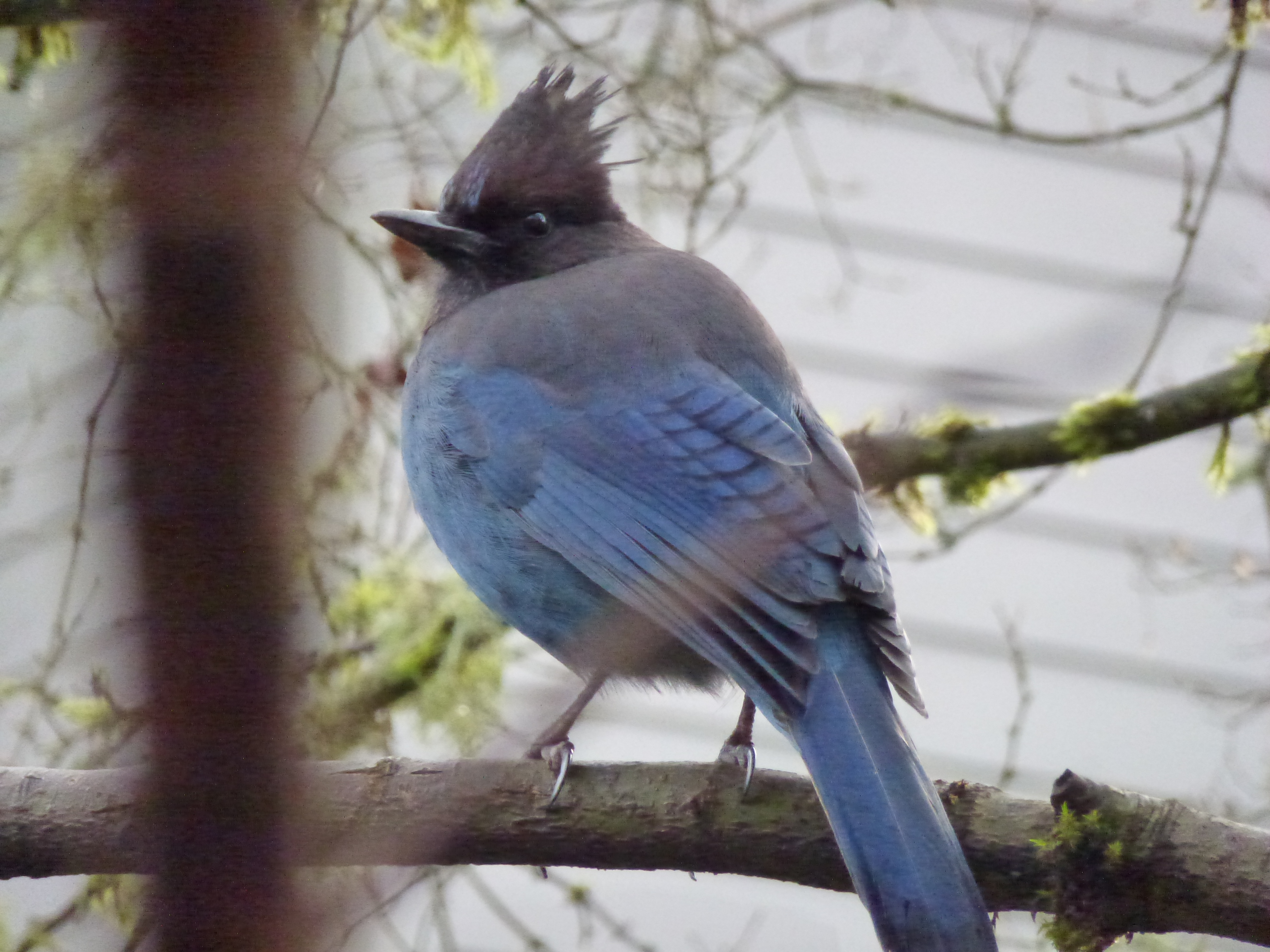
Adults along the Pacific Coast have blue streaks on their black crests.

Steller's jay is about 30–34 cm (12–13 in) long and weighs about 100–140 g (3.5–4.9 oz). Steller's jay shows a great deal of regional variation throughout its range. Blackish-brown-headed birds from the north gradually become bluer-headed farther south. Steller's jay has a more slender bill and longer legs than the blue jay and, in northern populations, has a much more pronounced crest. It is also somewhat larger than the blue jay's.

The head is blackish-brown, black, or dark blue, depending on the subspecies of the bird, with lighter streaks on the forehead. This dark coloring gives way from the shoulders and lower breast to silvery blue. The primaries and tail are a rich blue with darker barring. Birds in the eastern part of its range along the Great Divide have white markings on the head, especially over the eyes; birds further west have light blue markers and birds in the far west along the Pacific Coast have small, very faint, or no white or light markings at all.

== Phylogeny ==
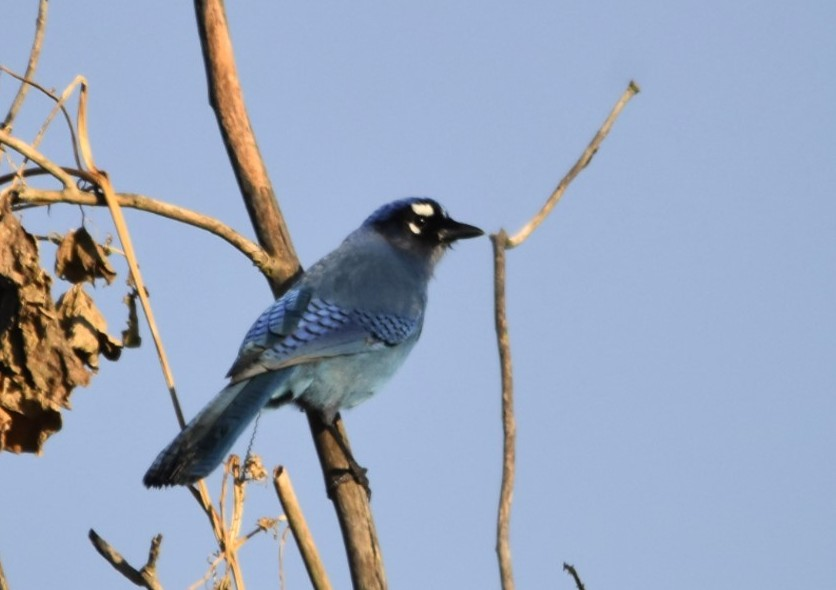
Cyanocitta stelleri ridgwayi, a subspecies of Steller's jay found from Chiapas to Guatemala

Steller's jay (Cyanocitta stelleri) is one of two species in the genus Cyanocitta, the other species being the blue jay (Cyanocitta cristata); because the two species sometimes interbreed naturally where their ranges overlap in the eastern foothills of the Rocky Mountains, their status as distinct species has been contested. There are 18 subspecies of Steller's jays ranging from Alaska to Nicaragua, with nine found north of Mexico, often with areas of low or non-existent presence of the species separating the subspecies. At least some of the variation in the species is due to different degrees of hybridization between Steller's jays (C. stelleri) and blue jays (C. cristata).

The genus Cyanocitta is part of the passerine family Corvidae, which consists of the crows, ravens, rooks, jackdaws, jays, magpies, treepies, choughs, and nutcrackers.

== Habitat ==
Steller's jay occurs in most of the forested areas of western North America as far east as the eastern foothills of the Rocky Mountains from southern Alaska in the north to northern Nicaragua in the south completely replacing the blue jay prevalent on the rest of the continent in those areas. Its density is lower in the central Rocky Mountain region (Montana, Idaho, Wyoming and eastern Utah) plus the desert or scrubland areas of the Great Basin (e.g. Nevada, western Utah, southern Arizona and parts of California). Some hybridization with the blue jay in eastern foothills of the Rocky Mountains, especially Colorado, has been reported. It is also found in Mexico occurring through the interior highlands in northwestern Mexico as well as patchy populations in the rest of Mexico. In the northern end of its range it appears to be spreading from coastal Southeast Alaska across the Coast Mountains into southern Yukon Territory.

Steller's jay is also found in Mexico's interior highlands from Chihuahua and Sonora in the northwest southward to Jalisco, as well as other patchy populations found throughout Mexico. It is also found in south-central Guatemala, northern El Salvador, Honduras and Nicaragua.

Although Steller's jay primarily lives in coniferous forests, it can be found in other types of forests as well. They can be found from low to moderate elevations, and on rare occasions to as high as the tree line. Steller's jays are common in residential and agricultural areas with nearby forests.

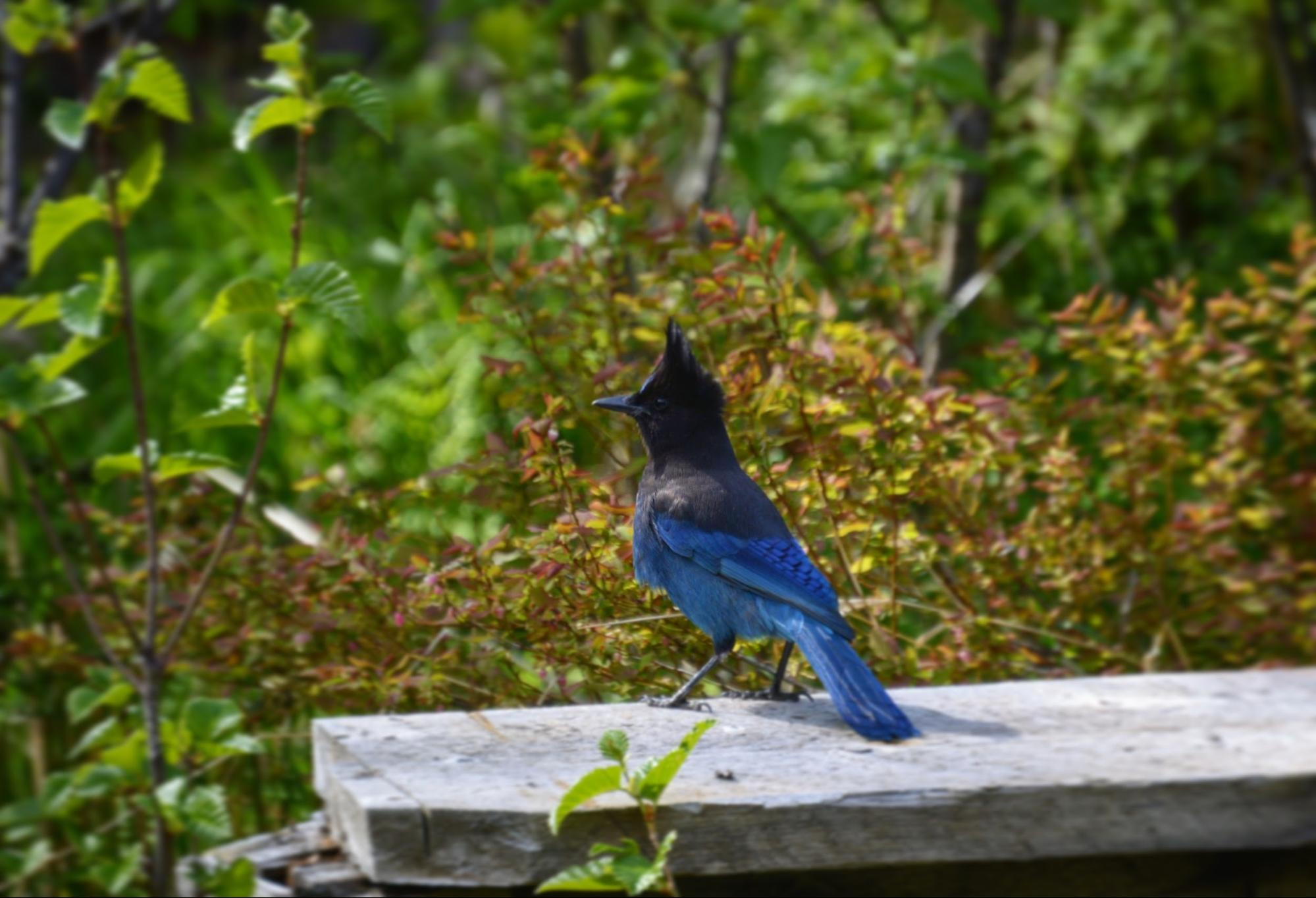
Western-variety Steller's jay, with all-dark head, in Alaska Maritime National Wildlife Refuge.

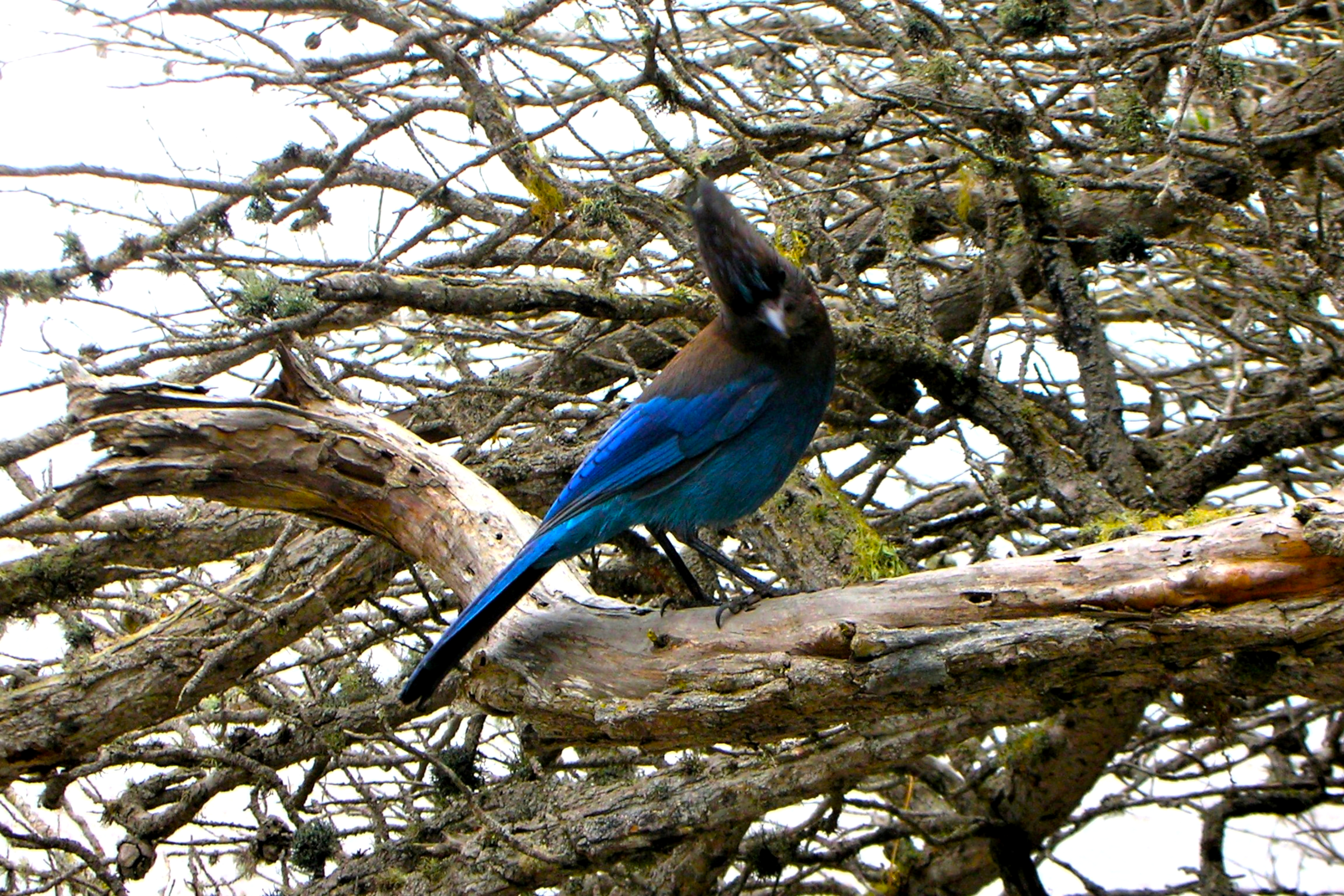
Steller's jay on Pebble Beach, California, USA.

== Diet ==
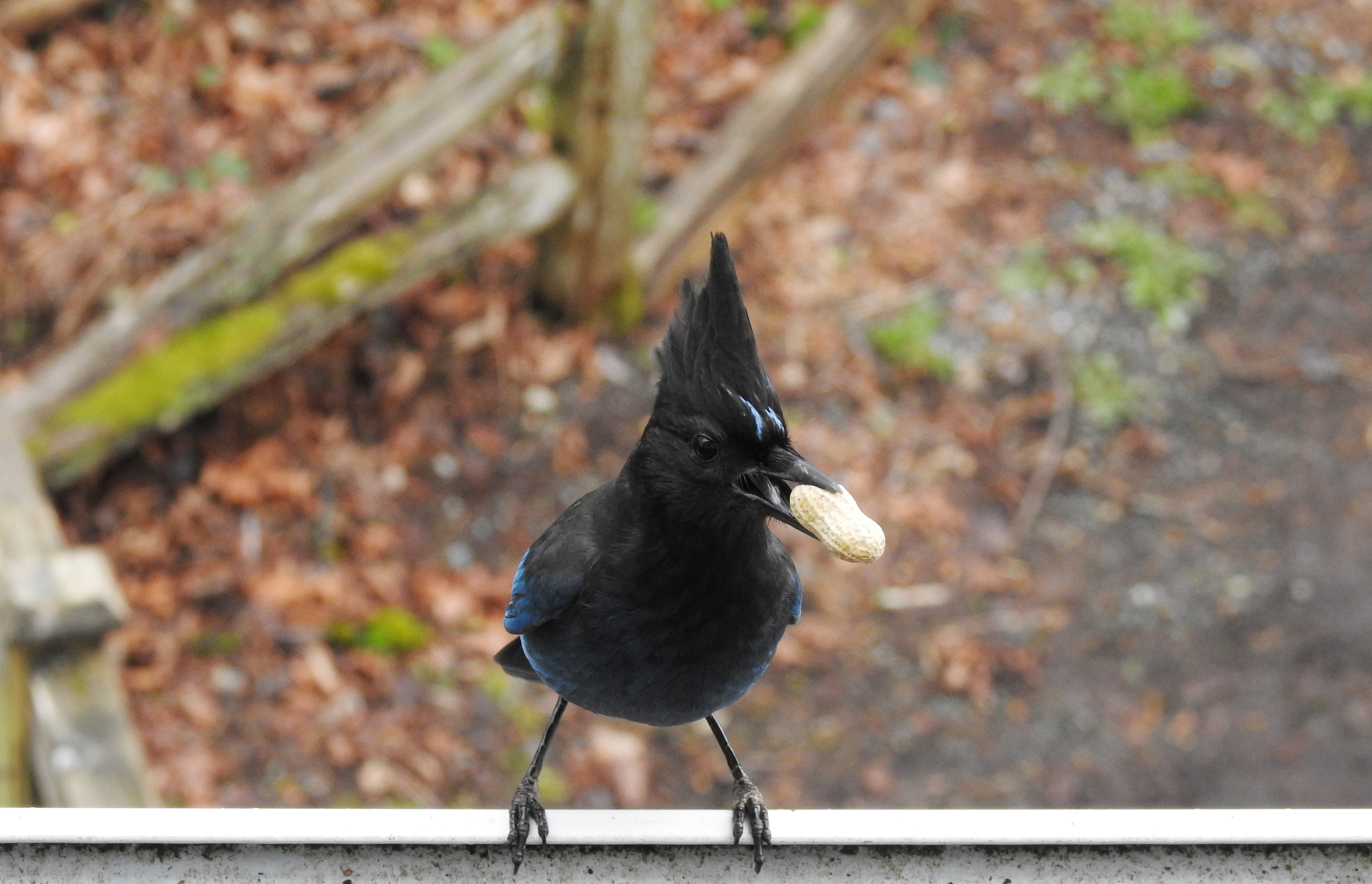
Steller's jays are omnivorous and can be social with humans.

Steller's jays are omnivores; their diet is about two-thirds plant matter and one-third animal matter. They gather food both from the ground and from trees. Steller's jay's diet includes a wide range of seeds, nuts, berries and other fruit. They also eat many types of invertebrates, small rodents, eggs, and nestlings such as those of the marbled murrelet. There are some accounts of them eating small reptiles, both snakes and lizards.

Acorns and conifer seeds are staples during the non-breeding season; these are often cached in the ground or in trees for later consumption. They exploit human-provided food sources, frequently scavenging picnics and campsites, where they compete with the Canada jay.

Steller's jays will visit feeders and prefer black-oil sunflower seeds, white striped sunflower seeds, cracked corn, shelled raw peanuts, and are especially attracted to whole raw peanuts. Suet is also consumed but mostly in the winter season.

== Breeding ==
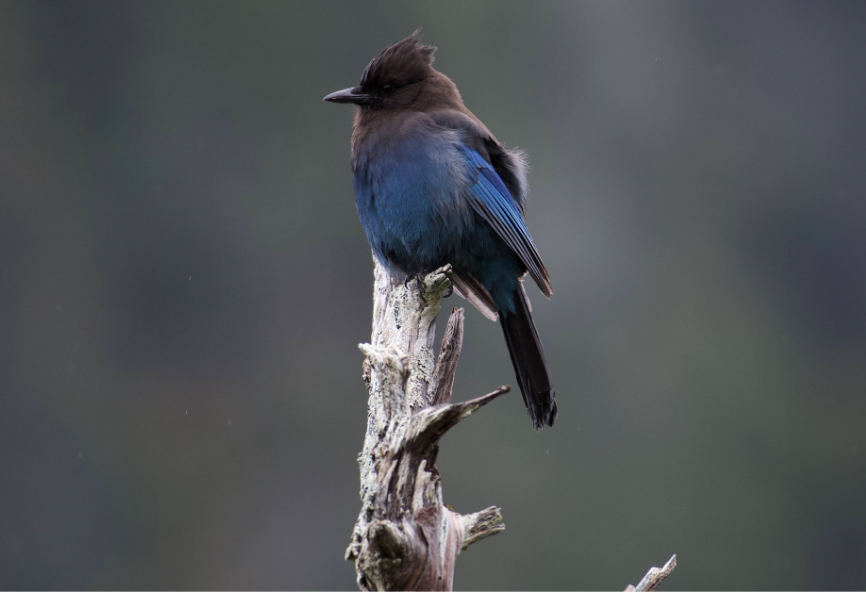
Kenai National Wildlife Refuge, Alaska

Steller's jays breed in monogamous pairs. The clutch is usually incubated entirely by the female for about 16 days. The male feeds the female during this time. Though they are known to be loud both day and night, during nesting they are quiet in order to not attract attention.

The nest is usually in a conifer, but is sometimes built in a hollow in a tree or beneath the awning of a house or other structure. Similar in construction to the blue jay's nest, it tends to be a bit larger (25 to 43 cm (9.8 to 16.9 in)), using a number of natural materials or scavenged trash, often mixed with mud as a binder. Between two and six eggs are laid during breeding season with an incubation period of 16 days and a nestling period of 16 days. The eggs are oval in shape with a length of 2.7 to 3.5 cm (1.1 to 1.4 in), a width of 2 to 2.4 centimeters (0.8 to 0.8 in), and a moderately glossy surface. The background color of the eggshell tends to be pale variations of greenish-blue with brown- or olive-colored speckles.

== Vocalizations ==
Like other jays, Steller's jay has numerous and variable vocalizations. Common calls include a harsh "SHACK-Sheck-sheck-sheck-sheck-sheck" series; a "skreeka! skreeka!" call, which sounds like an old-fashioned pump handle; and a soft, breathy "hoodle hoodle" whistle. Its alarm call is a harsh, nasal "wah". Some calls are sex-specific: females produce a rattling sound, while males make a high-pitched "gleep gleep".

Steller's jay is also a noted mimic; it can imitate the vocalizations of many species of birds, other animals, and sounds of non-animal origin. It often will imitate the calls from birds of prey such as the red-tailed hawk, red-shouldered hawk, and osprey as a warning of danger to others or territorial behavior, causing other birds to seek cover and flee feeding areas.

Steller's jays have the ability to assess risk using different predator detection cues. They have many alarm calls that are dependent on their interaction between predator identity and cue type. When Steller's jays see a sharp-shinned hawk, they stop foraging for the same length of time as if the hawk had been heard instead. In contrast, Steller's jays exhibit a longer latency to return to feeding when northern goshawks are seen rather than heard. The difference in reactions suggests that a distinct risk assessment is conducted by Steller's jays. Steller's jays will then vary the production of their "wah", "wek", and mimic red-tailed hawk calls in response to different detection cues.

== Provincial bird ==
On December 17, 1987, the Steller's jay became the provincial bird of the Canadian province of British Columbia when the people voted it as the most popular bird.
