= Donald Johnstone =

Donald Johnstone may refer to:

- Donald Johnstone (canoeist) (born 1963), New Zealand slalom canoer
- Donald Campbell Johnstone (1857-1920), British judge in India
- D. Bruce Johnstone (born 1941), American educator

== See also ==
- Donald Johnston (disambiguation)
