= Donald Johnston =

Donald or Don Johnston may refer to:

- Donald R. Johnston (1947–1969), American soldier and Medal of Honor recipient
- Donald Johnston (rower) (1899–1984), American rower and Olympic gold medalist
- Donald Johnston (cricketer) (1894-1918), English cricketer and British Army officer
- Don Johnston (1936–2022), Canadian politician and lawyer
- Don Johnston (swimmer) (1929–2018), South African swimmer

== See also ==
- Don Johnson (disambiguation)
- Donald Johnstone (disambiguation)
