= Restella =

Conservation status
- Least Concern (IUCN 3.1)

Scientific classification
- Kingdom: Plantae
- Clade: Tracheophytes
- Clade: Angiosperms
- Clade: Eudicots
- Clade: Rosids
- Order: Malvales
- Family: Thymelaeaceae
- Genus: Restella; Pobed.
- Species: R. alberti

Binomial name
- Restella alberti (Regel) Pobed.

Synonyms
- Stellera alberti Regel; Wikstroemia alberti (Regel) Mottet

Species of flowering plants

Restella is a monotypic genus of flowering plants belonging to the family Thymelaeaceae. It only contains one known species, Restella alberti (Regel) Pobed.

It is native to Tadzhikistan, Uzbekistan and Kyrgyzstan. It is listed as least concern in these 3 regions. It has a limited habitat range in Uzbekistan and Kyrgyzstan, but the plant is not under any threats. Most of the populations of the plant in Uzbekistan are within protected areas.

The genus name of Restella is in honour of Georg Wilhelm Steller (1709–1746), a German botanist, zoologist, physician and explorer, who worked in Russia and is considered a pioneer of Alaskan natural history. The specific epithet alberti honors Albert von Regel, one of two collectors of specimens cited in the original publication of the species in 1886 as Stellera albertii by Albert's father, Eduard August von Regel. The genus was first described and published in Bot. Zhurn. (Moscow & Leningrad) Vol.26 on pages 35-36 in 1941.
