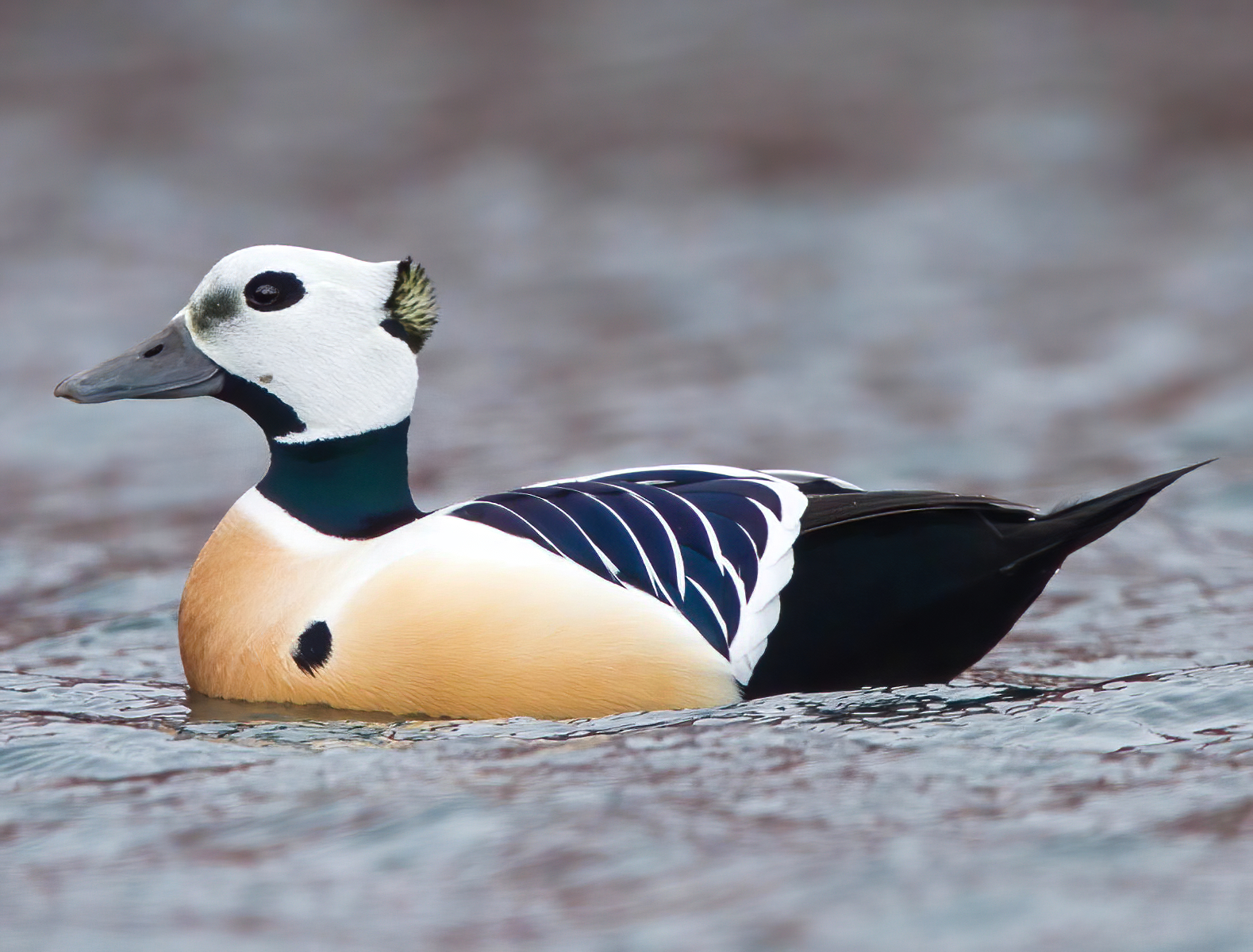
- Male (drake)
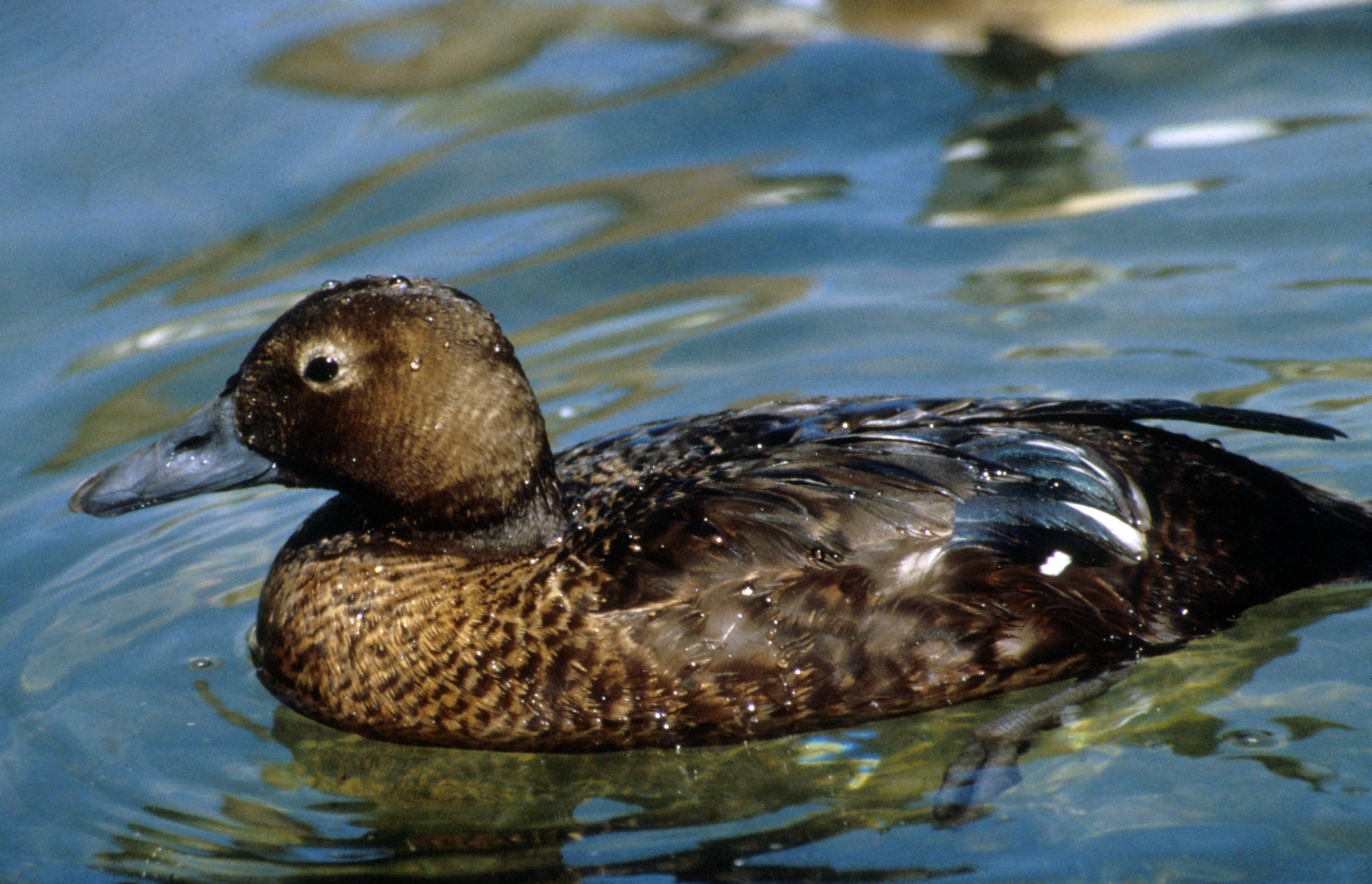
- Female (duck)

Conservation status
- Vulnerable (IUCN 3.1)

Scientific classification
- Kingdom: Animalia
- Phylum: Chordata
- Class: Aves
- Order: Anseriformes
- Family: Anatidae
- Genus: Polysticta; Eyton, 1836
- Species: P. stelleri

Binomial name
- Polysticta stelleri (Pallas, 1769)

= Steller's eider =

Species of bird

Steller's eider (Polysticta stelleri) is a migratory Arctic sea duck that breeds along the coastlines of Russia and Alaska, as well as in the Baltic Sea. It is the smallest, and fastest flying of the duck species known as eiders; it is closely related to the other species of eider in the genus Somateria, but sufficiently distinct to be given separate recognition as the only member of the genus Polysticta.

Due to the extensive contraction of its breeding range, the Alaska-breeding population of Steller's eider was listed as vulnerable in 1997 by the International Union for the Conservation of Nature (IUCN). The species is protected in Estonia, Finland, Norway, Russia and the United States, and is the subject of an ongoing recovery plan by the European Union and U.S. Fish and Wildlife Service.

== Taxonomy ==
Steller's eider was formally described and illustrated in 1769 by the German naturalist Peter Simon Pallas from a specimen collected on the Kamchatka Peninsula in Eastern Russia. He coined the binomial name Anas stelleri; the specific epithet was chosen to honour the German naturalist and explorer Georg Wilhelm Steller. Steller's eider is now the only species placed in the genus Polysticta that was introduced in 1836 by the English naturalist Thomas Eyton. The species is monotypic, with no subspecies being recognised. The genus name is from Ancient Greek polustiktos meaning "much spotted" (from polus "many" and stiktos "spotted").

Steller's eider was separated from the other eider species into its own genus in 1945 due to behavioural and anatomical differences. Genetically, it is however closely related to all other extant eider species in the genus Somateria. Its closest relative was the now-extinct Labrador duck Camptorhynchus labradorius, but with these two species next closest to the genus Somateria; the genetic divide of these two from Somateria is only marginally larger than the genetic variation within the genus Melanitta.

== Description ==
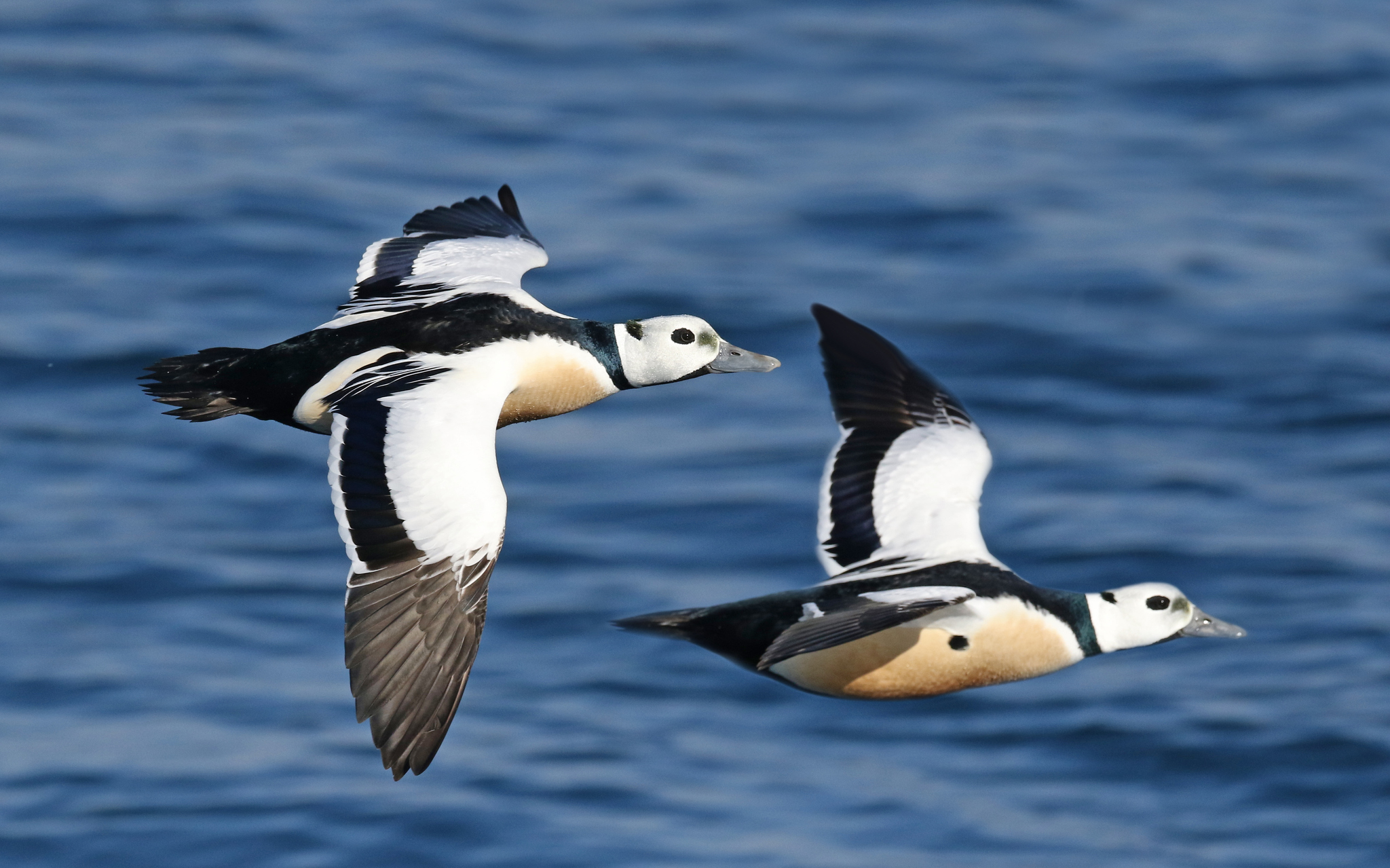
Male Steller's eiders in flight

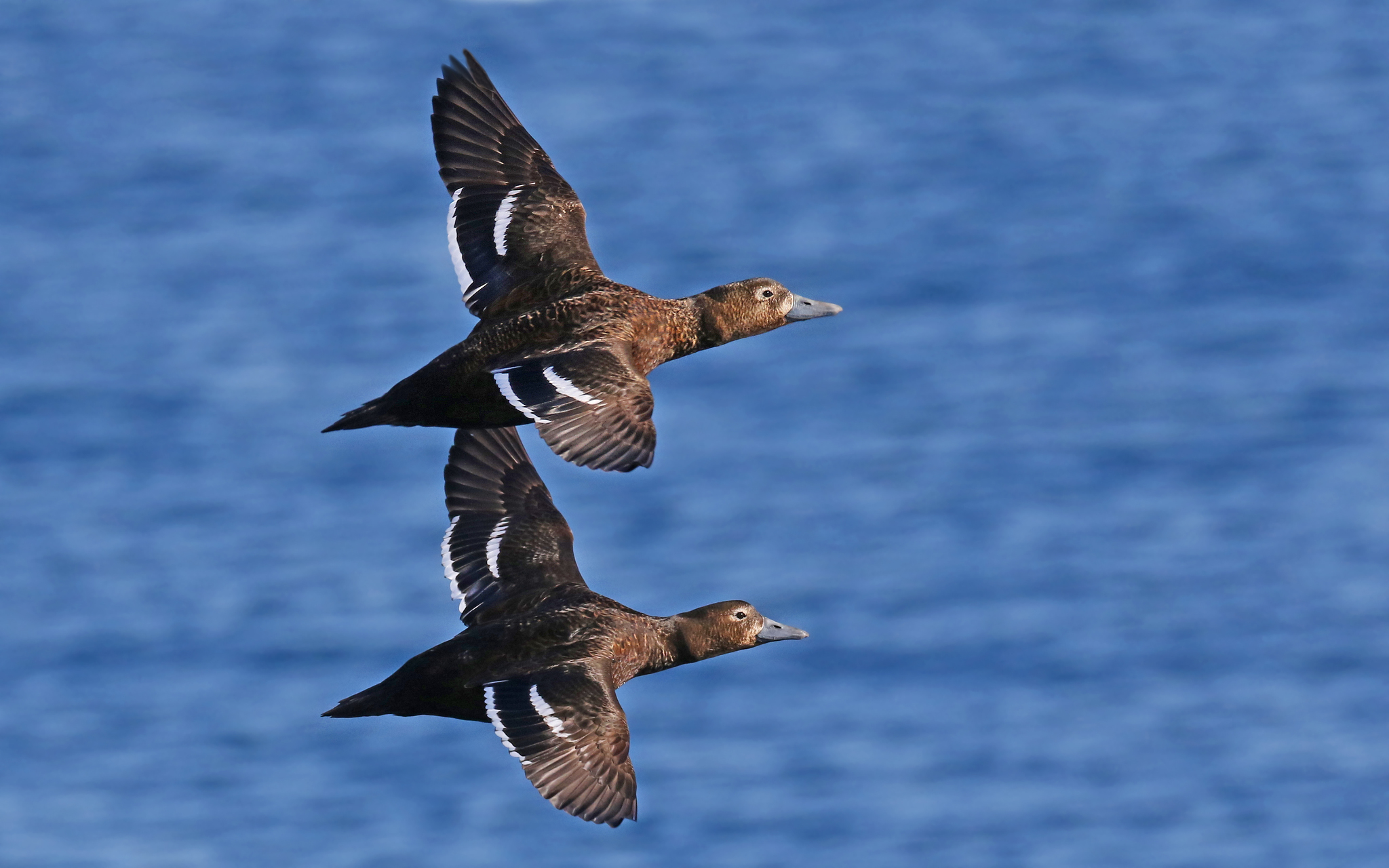
Female Steller's eiders in flight

Steller's eider is the smallest of the four eiders, with both females and males weighing 860 g (30 oz) on average. They have a compact body with a relatively large head with a flat crown and an angled nape, and a long, thick bill; the tail is relatively longer than other eiders. The males assume their breeding plumage from early winter to midsummer with a black cap, chin, collar, eye-ring, and rump, with a white head and shoulders, light green patches behind the head and in front of the eye, and the cinnamon breast and shoulders marked with a prominent black spot. The tertial feathers are long, draped over the folded wing, dark purple-black, with a while stripe along each. In mid-summer to autumn, males assume their 'eclipse' (non-breeding) plumage, which is primarily dark brown like females, but retaining the white inner forewing, conspicuous in flight. Both sexes have an iridescent bluish-purple speculum on the secondary feathers on their wing, with white borders running the entire length of the secondaries. Females are dark to cinnamon brown, with a pale-white eye-ring; the juveniles are similar, but lighter brown, and with only narrow white edges to the speculum and short tertial feathers. The feet are palmate, with three fully webbed toes, dark bluish-grey, with the legs the same colour.

Standard Measurements
Length	42–48 cm (17–19 in)
Weight	860 g (30 oz)
Wingspan	68–77 cm (27–30 in)
Wing, ♂	208–225 mm (8.2–8.9 in)
Wing, ♀	205–210 mm (8.1–8.3 in)
Culmen	36–42 mm (1.4–1.7 in)
Tarsus	36–40 mm (1.4–1.6 in)

== Habitat and distribution ==
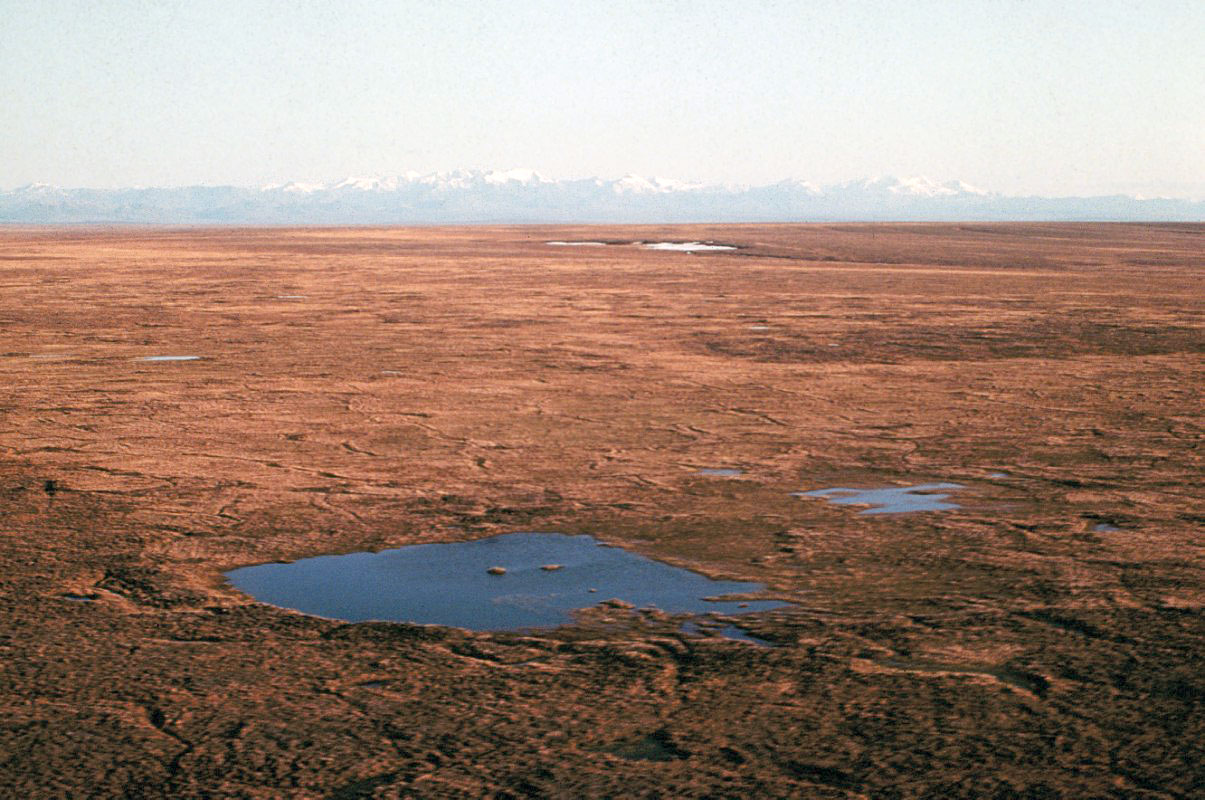
Marshy tundra, Alaska, USA

During the winter, Steller's eiders occupy coastal bays and lagoons that offer suitable forage while occasionally feeding in deeper waters that remain adequately sheltered. They nest in marshy tundra along the coast, in areas dominated by water sedge and pendant grass. Within the marshy tundra, they designate specific areas to build their nest, preferring elevated surfaces covered by shallow vegetation such as mosses and grasses. Their moulting habitat consists of relatively shallow coastal lagoons that offer viable eelgrass and tidal flats for foraging and beaches and sandbars to rest while they remain flightless.

=== Population distributions ===
There are three recognised breeding populations of Steller's eiders, one in Alaska and two in Arctic Russia.

- The Russian-Atlantic population breeds west of the Khatanga River in western Siberia, and winters in the Barents and Baltic seas.
- The Russian-Pacific population breeds east of the Khatanga River, and winters in the southern Bering Sea and northern Pacific Ocean.
- The Alaska-breeding population nests on the Arctic Coastal Plain and in exceptionally small numbers in the Yukon–Kuskokwim Delta, and winters in the southern Bering Sea and northern Pacific ocean. Less than 1% of the world's Steller's eiders nest in Alaska.

Some non-breeding populations will also spend their summers in northern Norway, on the east coast of Russia and adjacent waters, and south-west Alaska.

== Behaviour and ecology ==
=== Diet ===
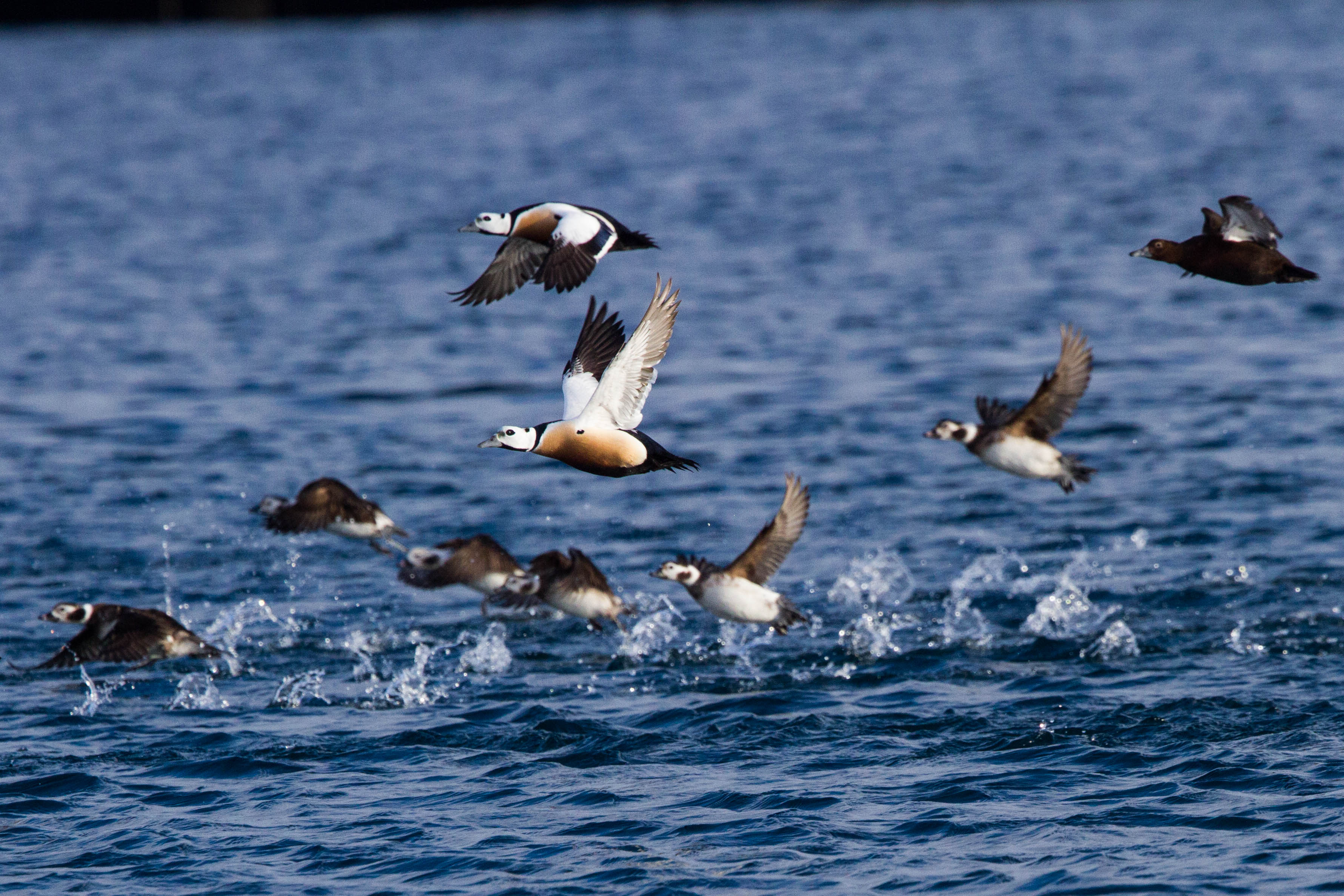
A mixed flock of Steller's eiders and long-tailed ducks

Steller's eiders forage primarily near the shore by employing various techniques such as briefly diving and swimming underwater (to a maximum depth of 9 m), wading and dabbling. They feed by surface techniques more than other sea ducks and prefer relatively small prey. Studies have shown that Steller's eiders are specialists in catching highly mobile prey but may limit their diet to crustaceans even when higher energy sources, such as capelin, become available. This discrepancy in food preferences may be due to their inability to exploit deeper habitats. Steller's eiders also feed on molluscs, echinoderms, polychaete worms, and mussels during the winter. While in the tundra during the summer months, they feed on aquatic insects and plant material such as crowberries and pondweeds.

=== Reproduction ===
According to ringing studies, Steller's eiders reach sexual maturity at two years, and can live up to 21 years 4 months. Males engage in leks on the wintering and breeding grounds, where groups of males attempt to win over an individual female with elaborate displays. Males court females in silence by displaying a consistent sequence of side-to-side head-shaking while swimming towards and away from their potential female partner. Steller's eiders tend to form breeding pairs during late-winter to early-spring instead of the fall like most waterfowl. Breeding pairs arrive at their nesting sites as early as the beginning of June.

Females establish their nests in marshy tundra close to permanent open water that has additional access to small ponds. They specifically select mounds or ridges dominated by mosses, lichens, and grasses. Their nest is shallow, lined with grasses, moss, lichens, and down feathers plucked from the female's breast, who builds the nest without help from the male.

Females usually lay 1–8 olive to brownish-orange eggs per breeding cycle. She then incubates the eggs alone for about 25 days. The young are precocial and hatch between late June and late July with their eyes open and sporting downy feathers. However, predators may consume the majority of eggs before they are hatched. The young go to the water shortly after hatching and immediately feed themselves, without relying on their mother for food. Regardless of their feeding independence, females will stay within 700 m of their nest for up to 35 days post-hatch, while the young begin flying approximately 40 days after hatching. It is not uncommon for one female to assume care of two or more sets of young from a different mother.

Average Nest Dimensions
Diameter	37 cm (14.6 in)
Height	20 cm (7.7 in)
Cup Diameter	14 cm (5.7 in)
Cup Height	9.4 cm (3.7 in)

=== Vocal behaviour ===
Males make a low jumbled growling sound, while females make a discrete "qua-haaa" sound of a similar tone. Males have also been reported to produce a repetitive crackling sound when females go underwater. Notably, the males court the females in silence. During flight, their feathers produce a mechanical whistling sound.

=== Moult ===
After breeding, Steller's eiders gather in high-density flocks to moult (replace all their feather at the same time) synchronously in Arctic lagoons in northwest Asia and along the Alaska peninsula. They remain flightless for about three weeks, but the entire flight-feather moult lasts from July to October. Juveniles moult first, followed by adult males and adult females.

== Threats ==
The decline of Alaska-breeding Steller's eider population is predominantly unclear. It has been attributed to changes to the Arctic climate, increased predation rates, hunting and consumption of lead shot, and disease. Since their listing, additional threats such as exposure to oil and other contaminants have been identified.

=== Climate change ===
Climate change may pose the greatest threat to Steller's eiders. Primarily, climate change has caused Arctic tundra ponds to disappear, limiting the extent of suitable habitat for the species. Climate change has also been implicated in the collapse of rodent populations, forcing predators to exploit alternative prey such as the eggs and young of Steller's eider.

=== Lead poisoning ===
High levels of lead have been reported in Steller's eiders that nest on the Alaska Arctic Coastal plain and in Spectacled Eiders that occupy the Yukon–Kuskokwim Delta, where Steller's Eiders continue to nest in highly reduced densities. Further studies have also shown that lead concentration was higher in individuals located close to industrialised regions than non-industrialised regions.

=== Nest predation ===
Nest predation by the Arctic fox, pomarine jaeger, snowy owl, and common raven pose the greatest threat to Steller's eider nesting success rates. Studies have shown that Steller's eider reproduce most successfully when lemmings are abundant, most likely resulting from predators transitioning between prey during years of lemming decline.

=== Natural resource exploitation ===
The exploitation of natural resources such as oil and gas contributes to Steller's eider habitat loss. Regional exploitation projects have increased the risk of spill contamination. At the same time, an increase in human presence and infrastructure have contributed to the demise of suitable habitats.

=== Disease ===
Steller's eiders transport the Avian Influenza virus between Eurasia and North America during their migrations. Many recent studies have reported prominent infection rates amongst Steller's eiders in Alaska, ranging from 0.2% to 5%. It has been suggested that 80% of Steller's eiders in Alaska have antibodies to avian influenza.

E. coli has also been reported in Alaska-breeding Steller's eiders and is thought to be linked to wastewater from local human communities and industrialisation.

== Recovery plan ==
Two recovery plans have been implemented to restore healthy populations of Steller's eiders. The European Union action plan, published in 2000 and The United States Fish and Wildlife Service action plan, originally published in 2002.

=== United States Fish and Wildlife Service Action Plan ===
The Recovery Plan for the Alaska-breeding population of Steller's eider (Polysticta stelleri) was last revised by the United States Fish and Wildlife Service in September 2020. The primary focus of this plan is to ensure a viable breeding population of Steller's eider in northern Alaska, rather than aiming for two subpopulations in northern and western Alaska. The plan aims to:

- Increase the abundance of Steller's eiders
- Ensure adequate population distribution throughout the Utqiaġvik Triangle and Arctic Coastal Plain survey areas
- Increase the number of Alaska-breeding Steller's eiders

The recovery plan is primarily limited by uncertainty about the Alaska-breeding Steller's eider's ecology and population dynamics. Thus, the action plan coincides with an effort to conduct research and enhance knowledge of the species.

The United States Fish and Wildlife Service predicts that if the plan is adequately funded and properly implemented, the recovery criteria could be met by 2050. The total cost is estimated at $15,675,000.

==== Critical habitat designation ====
In 2001 the United States Fish and Wildlife Service designated five critical breeding habitats on the Yukon–Kuskokwim Delta and four marine water units along the coast of southwest Alaska that are critical for moulting, feeding, and wintering. The entire designation includes approximately 7,300 square kilometres (2,800 sq mi) and 1,370 kilometres (850 mi) of coastline.

== Conservation status ==
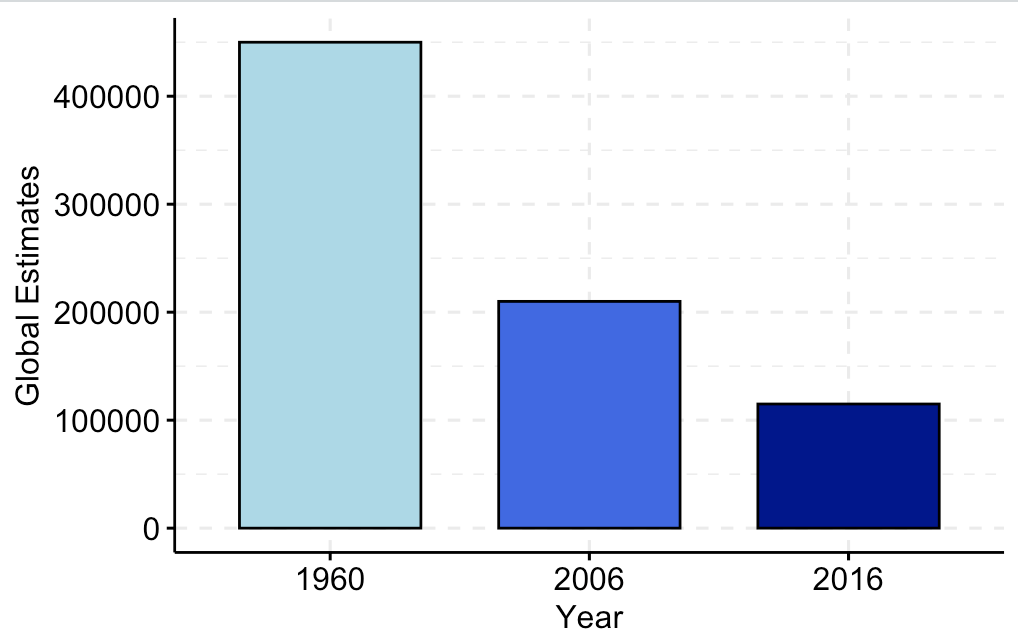
Global population estimates of Steller's eider

In 2016, the global population of Steller's eider was estimated at 110,000–125,000 individuals and classified as vulnerable by the International Union for the Conservation of Nature (IUCN).

In 1992, the United States Fish and Wildlife Service reviewed the status of Steller's eider and concluded that listing the species as endangered was warranted, but precluded by higher species listing priorities. One year later, in 1993, they reconsidered Steller's eider's status and supported the listing of the Alaska-breeding population, but did not include the Russian-breeding populations. Finally, the Alaska-breeding population was listed as threatened in 1997. The primary reason for listing was the near disappearance of the Yukon–Kuskokwim Delta population, contracting the Alaskan nesting sites to the Arctic Coastal Plain and increasing the population's risk of extirpation.`

== Cultural significance ==
Steller's eiders were once legally harvested by waterfowl hunters in the United States, but all legal hunting ended in 1991. Egg collection and subsistence hunting still occurs in Alaska, but is uncommon. The degree of subsistence hunting in Russia and its effect on the population is poorly documented.
