= Steller's sea ape =

Purported marine mammal

Creature information
- Grouping: Mammalian

Origin
- First attested: 1741
- Country: United States
- Region: Aleutian Islands, Alaska
- Details: Lives in oceans

Steller's sea ape is a purported marine mammal, observed by German zoologist Georg Steller on 10 August 1741, around the Shumagin Islands in Alaska. The animal was described as being around 1.5 m (5 feet) long; with a dog-like head; long drooping whiskers; an elongated but robust body; a thick fur coat; no limbs; and tail fins much like a shark. He described the creature as being playful and inquisitive like a monkey. After observing it for two hours, he attempted to shoot and collect the creature, but missed, and the creature swam away.

There have been four attempts to scientifically classify the creature, described as Simia marina, Siren cynocephala, Trichechus hydropithecus, and Manatus simia. Most likely, Steller simply misidentified a northern fur seal.

== Accounts ==
=== Original account ===
Locations of purported sightings

German zoologist Georg Steller, aboard the ship St. Peter on Vitus Bering's Great Northern Expedition (1733–1743), described several new species during the voyage. At around sunset on 10 August 1741, near the Shumagin Islands, Alaska, Steller reported a strange and unidentifiable creature floating near the ship.

The creature purportedly stared at the ship for two hours, according to Steller, seemingly out of admiration. It came within a close enough proximity to the vessel that it reportedly could have been reached by a pole, but would swim farther out whenever the crew attempted to approach. Steller stated that it raised a third of its body out of the water, maintaining a human-like posture for several minutes. After half an hour, the creature dove under the water and swam underneath the ship to the other side, and did this repeatedly about 30 times.

Steller stated that, when a large seaweed stalk about 5.5–7.5 m (3–4 fathoms; 18–24 feet) long floated by, the creature quickly swam towards it and grabbed it with its mouth. It reportedly then swam closer to the ship and, allegedly, did juggling tricks with the seaweed like a trained monkey, though eating pieces of it now and again. Steller's description of it as a sea-monkey probably stemmed more from its exhibiting such behavior rather than it possessing simian features.

Steller attempted to shoot the animal to collect its body as a specimen, though missed. He reported that the creature disappeared for a moment, but quickly came back, frightened, and once again gradually neared the ship. Steller fired at it again, but missed or only wounded the creature, which swam away. It was not seen again.

=== Other accounts ===
In June 1965, on his ketch (Tzu Hang), sailor Miles Smeeton, his daughter Clio, and Smeeton's friend Henry Combe claimed to have seen a similar creature on the northern coast of Atka Island. They reported the animal in question as stretching to a length of about 1.5 m (5 feet), possessing 10–13-centimeter (4–5-inch) reddish-yellow fur, and having a face resembling that of a Shih Tzu. Mr. Smeeton details this 10–15 second encounter in his book Misty Island, noting Steller's observations closely matched his own.

== Description ==
Steller reported the creature as being two ells (1.8 m) long, the combined length of the forearm and extended hand. It purportedly had a dog-like head, with pointed and erect ears, large eyes, and whiskers on the upper and lower lips resembling a Fu Manchu mustache.

He described the body as being long and fat, and thinning towards the tail. He said the creature had a thick fur coat, which was gray on the back and reddish-white on the belly. He did not see any forelimbs or pectoral fins. The tail apparently had two fins, the upper fin double the size of the lower fin, much like a shark.

== Research history ==
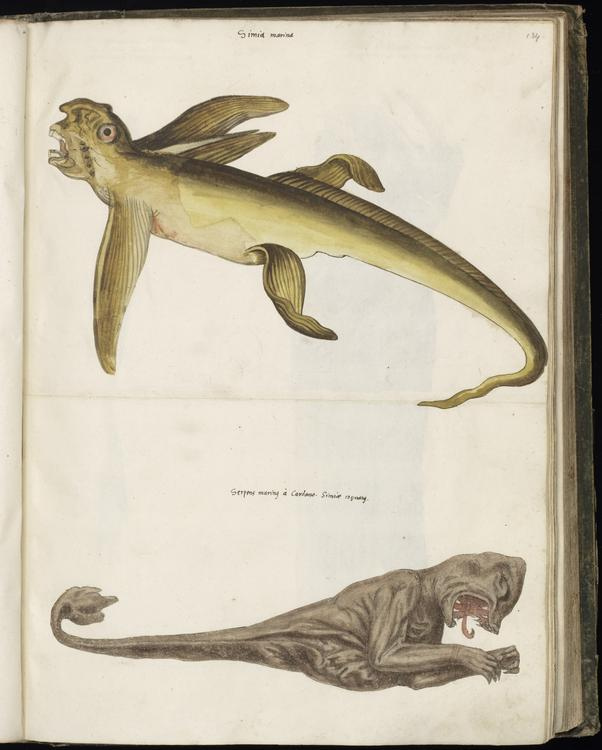
Simia marina in Conrad Gessner's Historia animalium

All Steller's writings regarding his expedition were published posthumously, but most of his writings were lost. His account of the creature was detailed in his diary, published in two installments by Prussian zoologist Peter Simon Pallas in 1781 and 1793. He also made a small note in his most famous book, De Bestiis Marinus, calling it an "imperfect account" for lack of a specimen:

I describe the traces of a certain unknown animal upon the island of Shumagin, and I insert a sketch of a sea ape, and with this imperfect account I must content myself and others.

Steller assigned this creature to "Simia marina" – which was illustrated in Swiss naturalist Conrad Gessner's book Historia animalium – based on its resemblance, strange behavior, rapid movements, and playfulness. However, the man who first reported "S. marina", Italian biologist Gerolamo Cardano, said it was likely a snake, and Gessner said that it had a covering more like a turtle, and the creature was reportedly green and hairless overall. At least five years had passed since Steller last saw or read a description of Gessner's sea ape to when he had described his account.

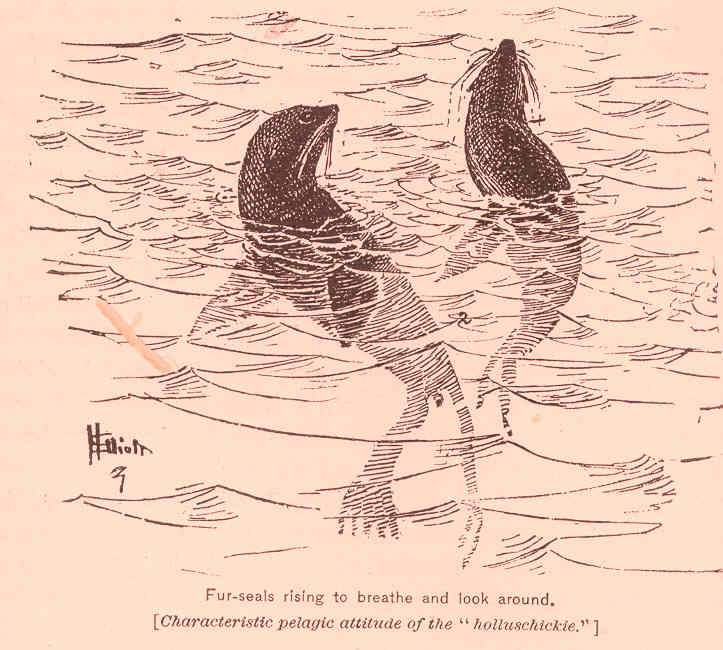
Steller may have misidentified a northern fur seal (above)

In 1792, German naturalist Johann Julius Walbaum scientifically described Steller's sea ape as Siren cynocephala. In 1800, on recommendation by Welsh naturalist Thomas Pennant, English zoologist George Shaw classified it as a manatee, Trichechus hydropithecus. In 1815, German zoologist Johann Karl Wilhelm Illiger also described it as a manatee, Manatus simia, but this work in particular was later called a "worthless conglomeration" of sirenian and cetacean species by American mammalogist Joel Asaph Allen in 1882, with new species listed for seemingly no reason without description or justification.

In 1805, German naturalist Wilhelm Gottlieb Tilesius von Tilenau noticed that Steller's sea ape very closely resembled the northern fur seal. Similarly, in 1936, Norwegian zoologist Leonhard Stejneger said Steller likely observed a bachelor fur seal, as fur seals in a playful mood have been known to exhibit the observed behaviors, and swim with their fore-flipper tucked in, which may have given the impression of completely lacking forelimbs in a low light setting. Also, Steller had made his account before he had ever encountered a fur seal.

== See also ==
- Steller's sea cow
- Steller sea lion
- Waitoreke
