= Bolsherechye =

Bolsherechye (Russian: Большере́чье) is the name of several inhabited localities in Russia.

Urban localities

- Bolsherechye, Omsk Oblast, a work settlement in Bolsherechensky District of Omsk Oblast

Rural localities

- Bolsherechye, Novosibirsk Oblast, a selo in Kyshtovsky District of Novosibirsk Oblast
