= John Warren Aldrich =

American ornithologist

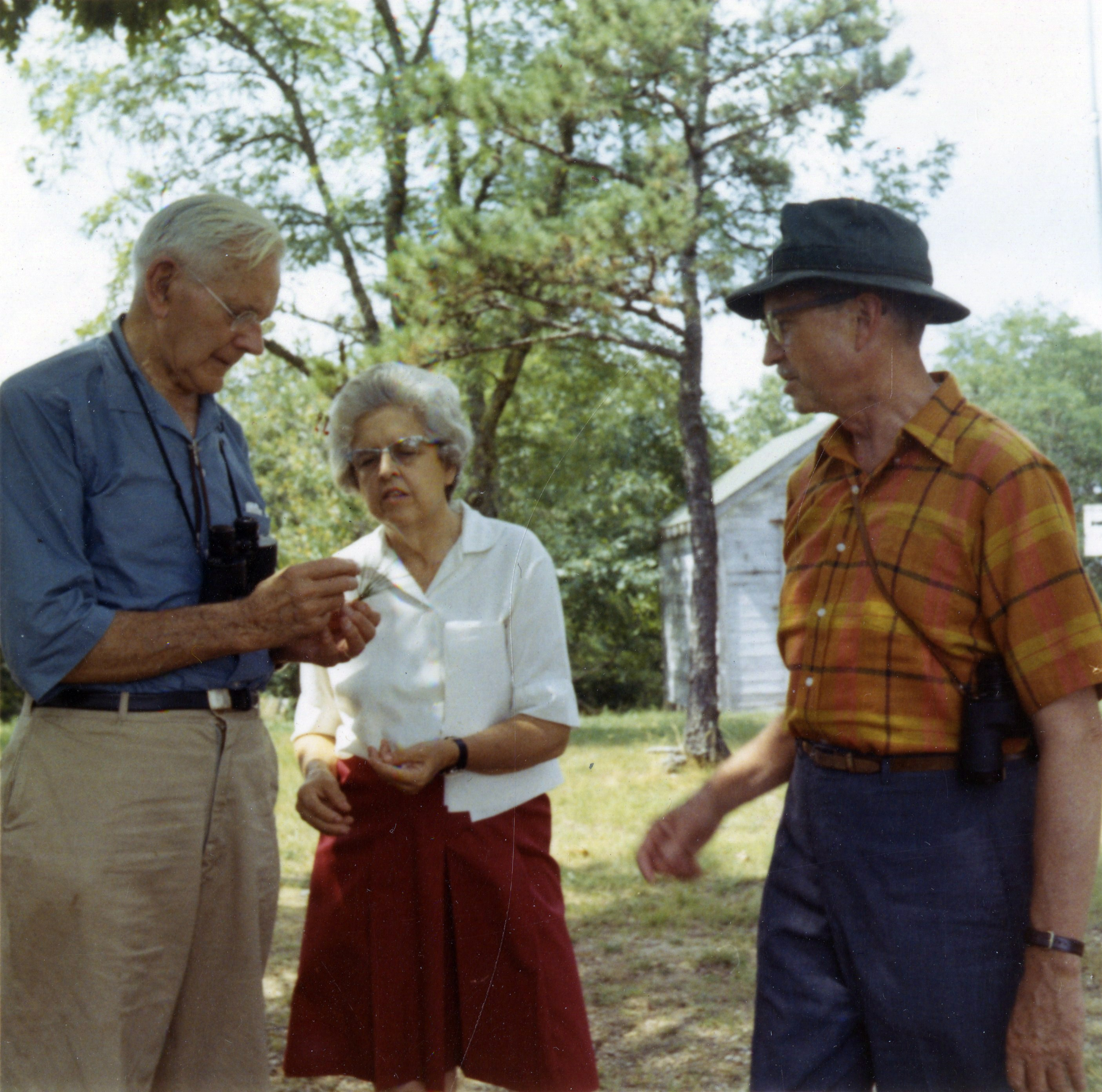
Aldrich (right) with Alexander Wetmore and Annie Beatrice van der Biest Thielan Wetmore, 1969

John Warren Aldrich (February 23, 1906 – May 3, 1995) was an American ornithologist.

== Biography ==
Aldrich was born on February 23, 1906, in Providence, Rhode Island. He went to Providence public schools, and got a BS degree in biology from Brown University, in 1928. In 1923 in Bird-Lore he published his first work "Mocking Bird in Rhode Island", which became very popular among Rhode Islanders interested in bird-watching. While attending Brown University, he joined a swimming team there, and set a record for the whole school on 200-yard breaststroke. He was a nature counselor at Camp Chewonki, in Maine. After graduating from Brown University, he attended Buffalo Museum of Science, which had just been built. There he served as an aide and assistant. While working there, he met Roger Tory Peterson, then an art student from Jamestown, New York. Aldrich got a biological assistant position in 1930, at the Cleveland Museum of Natural History, where he worked under supervision of Harry Oberholser. He met his love, Louise Kendall, in Cleveland, and went to Niagara Falls in 1933.

Aldrich did much field work in numerous states, including: Michigan, Ohio, Wyoming, and Ontario, Canada, which was under control of CMNH. He got multiple skin cancers while working in the sun. Later on, attended Western Reserve University, in which he earned an MA degree in biology, in 1937. During the same year, he also got a PhD, from the same university. After the PhD, he was appointed as a curator of birds at a museum.

In 1941, he became a PhD qualified biologist and joined Fish and Wildlife Service, and next year was elected to the Washington Biologists’ Field Club. Five years later, in 1947, he became a Chief of the Section of Distribution and Migration of Birds. In 1951, under his supervision, both mammal and bird investigations were joined. His bird studies range from population to systematics, which was oriented toward better understanding of population segments and kinds. From 1959 to 1962 he was President of WBFC, in which he stayed till he became an honorary member in 1982.

He retired in 1972, but still continued to work for Fish and Wildlife Service as an annuitant. A decade and 3 years later, his wife died from diabetes. After her death, 3 years later, he moved to Tucson, Arizona, where he, his daughter Betsy, her 3 sons, and his other daughter Jane, who came from California, lived. Aldrich died in Tucson from a stroke on May 3, 1995.

== Memory ==
After his death, a plaque was put up on a rock, which currently stands at Plummers Island, as a memory for his dedicated work in the ornithological field.
