= Don L. Johnson =

Outdoor writer from Wisconsin

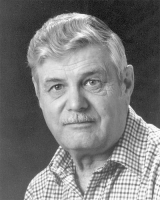
- Don L. Johnson
- Born: March 18, 1927; Milwaukee County, Wisconsin, U.S.
- Died: January 20, 2006 (aged 78)
- Education: University of Wisconsin-Madison
- Occupation: Journalist
- Notable credit: The Milwaukee Sentinel
- Spouse: Lorraine Senn
- Children: Douglas, Lynn

Don L. Johnson (March 18, 1927 – January 20, 2006) was an outdoor writer from Wisconsin. His career included nature writing, investigative reporting on environmental issues, and traditional outdoor writing about hunting, fishing, and related pursuits.

== Early life ==
Born March 18, 1927, Johnson grew up in Milwaukee County, Wisconsin, but spent much of his boyhood on family farms in Dodge and Buffalo counties, hunting and fishing. He graduated from Nathan Hale High School in West Allis, then served with the U.S. Navy in combat forces in the South Pacific during World War II. In 1949, he married Lorraine Senn. The couple had a son, Douglas, and a daughter, Lynn. He attended the University of Wisconsin in Madison, where he studied conservation and journalism and where he met Aldo Leopold. After graduating, he worked for several newspapers in northern Wisconsin and Minnesota.

== Career ==
In 1962, Johnson joined The Milwaukee Sentinel as the newspaper's outdoor writer, a post he held until 1984. During those years, Johnson reported on hunting, fishing, and wildlife throughout Wisconsin. He also reported on conservation issues, including an exposé of mercury pollution in the Wisconsin River and a series on pesticide pollution. In 1966, Johnson wrote a series of investigative reports about high concentrations of DDT in state waters. Despite threats of lawsuits and demands by chemical companies that he be fired, Johnson kept pursuing environmental stories. The series played a key role in making Wisconsin the first state to ban DDT, which ultimately led to a national ban.

In another series, Johnson challenged the U.S. Army Corps of Engineers as it tried to ditch and drain the Cache River bottomlands in Arkansas, for which he received an award from the Arkansas Wildlife Federation.

Johnson also took notes on his nature hikes, which he crafted into vignettes, many published in the Milwaukee Sentinel during the years that he worked as outdoor writer for that newspaper. In November 2005, a collection of his nature essays was published, titled Summer's Song and Other Essays.

Johnson left the Sentinel in 1984, but continued to write, freelancing articles and photographs to magazines. He published a 1995 book Grouse & Woodcock: A Gunner's Guide.

== Personal life and death ==
Johnson was an adventurer who hiked, hunted, fished, and photographed in such far-flung places as Africa, Cuba, the Andes, the Amazon, Mexico, the Yukon, and Alaska.

Johnson died on January 20, 2006, after a struggle with both Parkinson's disease and cancer.

== Honors ==
- 1961 - Gordon MacQuarrie Award "For Telling the Conservation Story".
- 1974 - Audubon Society recognized his investigative work "for accurate interpretive reporting on behalf of all life on earth"
- 2000 - Named by Wisconsin Outdoor Journal one of the 20 people who had the greatest influence on hunting and fishing in the state during the 20th century
- 2005 - Recognized by the Wisconsin Natural Resources Board for his contributions to conserving the state's natural resources
- 2005 - Honored by the Outdoor Writers Association of America "for excellence in outdoor communication"
- Named to the Milwaukee Press Club Media Hall of Fame
- Named to the Freshwater Fishing Hall of Fame
- Made an honorary life member of the Outdoor Communications Association "in recognition of a lifetime of service to Wisconsin's outdoors"
