= Stepan Glotov =

Russian navigator (c. 1729 – 1769)

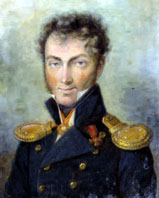
Stepan Glotov

Stephan Gavrilovich Glotov (Russian: Степа́н Гаврилович Гло́тов; c. 1729 in Yarensk, Russia – May 5, 1769 in Unimak Island) was a Russian navigator, explorer, and fur trader. He was the first Russian captain to enter the waters of the eastern Aleutian Islands, and was the European discoverer of Kodiak Island and several other Alaskan islands.

== Early voyages ==
Glotov's first recorded voyage was in 1746 aboard the vessel Ioann ("John"), belonging to the merchant Fyodor Kholodilov of Totma. This ship sailed from the Kamchatka Peninsula, hunting for sea otters and seals, and wintered on Bering Island. In the following spring, the Ioann went in search of the middle Aleutian Islands (the chain had fairly recently come to the awareness of the Russians), but were unsuccessful.

In 1758–1762, Glotov and Cossacks of the Nizhny Kamchatsky ostrog explored aboard the vessel Saint Julian. Aboard were the Cossack Ponomarev and the merchant Peter Shishkin. This expedition opened up the Aleutian Islands to the Russian fur trade.

The Saint Julian set off from the mouth of the Kamchatka River on September 2, 1758 (September 15 New Style). After nine days Glotov arrived at the Komandorski Islands. After spending the winter on Medny Island, Glotov's expedition sailed east and discovered Umnak Island in the Aleutians, landing there on September 1, 1759. Aleuts immediately attacked his expedition, wounding Glotov and killing two of his men, but Glotov exercised restraint at this time. Glotov and his men spent three winters at Umnak, amassing over a thousand pelts of fox fur (Glotov was the first to bring large amounts of fox fur back to Russia from Alaska) as well as many sea otter skins. During this time (1759–1762), Glotov and his men discovered several islands of the Aleutian chain, including Unimak and Unalaska.

The Saint Julian returned to Kamchatka on August 31, 1762 (September 13 New Style). In his report, Glotov lists 29 islands and describes their wildlife.

== 1762 expedition, and war against the Aleuts ==
On October 1, 1762 (October 14 New Style), Glotov embarked on another expedition from the coast of Kamchatka to the Aleutian Islands and the northwestern coast of North America, on the vessel Adrian and Natalia, belonging to the merchant Lapin. Glotov had a crew of 38 Russians and eight Kamchadals (Kamchatka natives). Glotov and his men again wintered on Medny Island, setting forth from there on July 26, 1763 (August 8 New Style). Glotov discovered several more islands, including Kodiak Island (the 80th largest island in the world, slightly larger than Cyprus, Puerto Rico, or Corsica).

During this expedition, Glotov and his men suppressed a revolt of the Aleut natives of the Fox Islands. The Aleuts were unhappy with the depredations of Promyshlenniks (Russian fur workers) who followed on the heels of the explorers, and who were brutal and avaricious and pursued a policy of forcing natives to work and pay the Yasak (tax paid in furs) by taking their families hostage. The Aleuts had consequently revolted against the Russian occupation, killing many Russians and driving most of the rest from the islands, and destroying most of the Russian vessels in the area.

Glotov and his men destroyed all the Aleut villages on the southern part of Umnak, and with the assistance of other forces the revolt was ended, with several hundred Aleuts being killed directly and many more perishing from related causes (wounds, hunger, cold and disease). This effectively ended Aleutian independence.

Ethnographer and missionary I. E. Veniaminov, relying on the accounts of eyewitnesses of these events, wrote of Glotov: "He, under the pretext of revenge for the death of his compatriots, as well as for rebellion itself, destroyed almost all the villages that were on the southern side of Umnak, and the inhabitants of the islands of Samalga and the Islands of Four Mountains."

In the course of this expedition, Glotov collected valuable ethnographic information about the Aleuts, in addition to killing them.

== Final voyage and death ==
In October of 1768, Glotov was part of an expedition led by Krenitsyn and Levashov, which explored 200 kilometres (120 miles) of the northern coast of the Alaska Peninsula and discovered Port Moller Bay.

Glotov died of scurvy in the spring of 1769, while wintering on Unimak Island.

A mountain on Kodiak Island is named for Glotov, as is a street in the village of Yarensk.

In 1992, archaeologists working for the Aleut located the site where Glotov was attacked by armed Unangan.
