= Aleuts in Russia =

Aleuts in Russia are Indigenous Aleut people who live on Bering Island, one of the islands of the Commander Islands located in the Russian administrative division of Kamchatka Krai. In 2000, the Aleuts of Bering Island were recognized by Russian government decree as a small-numbered Indigenous people. Around 300 Russian Aleuts live in the community of Nikolskoye on Bering Island, the sole populated place on the island.

== History ==
The Commander Islands were unpopulated when they were first visited by Russian colonizers in 1741. The Aleut population of Bering Island is descended from the Aleut people who were taken to the island by Russian colonial administrators in the early 1800s.

== See also ==
- Alaska Natives
- Mednyj Aleut language
- Unified list of Indigenous minority peoples of the North, Siberia, and the Far East of Russia
