= Admiral Kuznetsov Strait =

Strait connecting the Bering Sea and the Pacific Ocean

Coordinates: 54°46′31″N 167°06′50″E

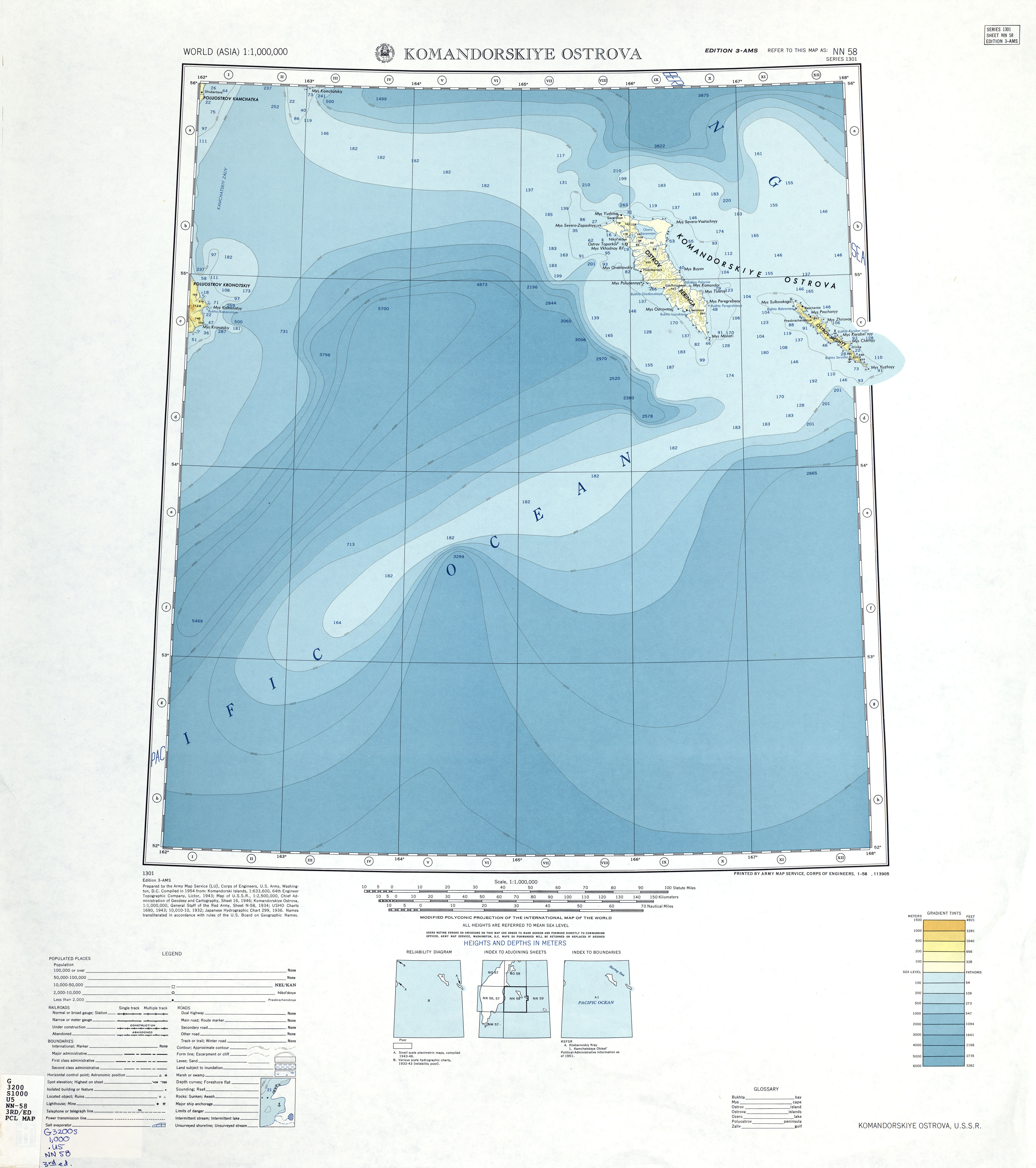
Map showing the location of Admiral Kuznetsov Strait

Admiral Kuznetsov Strait (Russian: Пролив Адмирала Кузнецова) is a 50 km-wide strait in Russia. It separates Medny Island and Bering Island of the Commander Islands and connects the Bering Sea in the north with the Pacific Ocean in the south. Named in honor of Admiral Nikolay Kuznetsov.
