= Preobrazhenskoye, Kamchatka Oblast =

Ghost town in Russia

Preobrazhenskoye Преображенское
- Selo
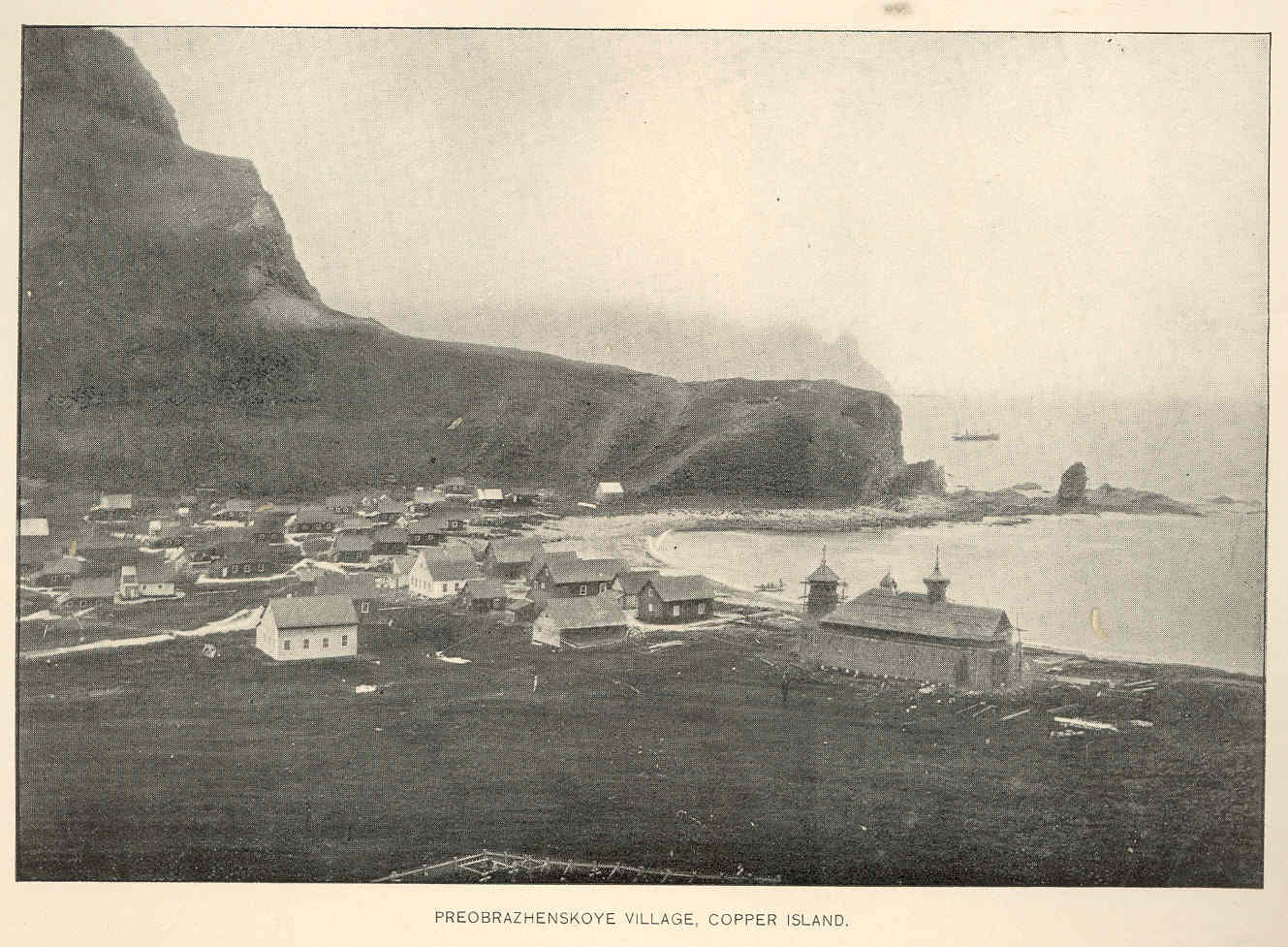
- Preobrazhenskoye in 1897

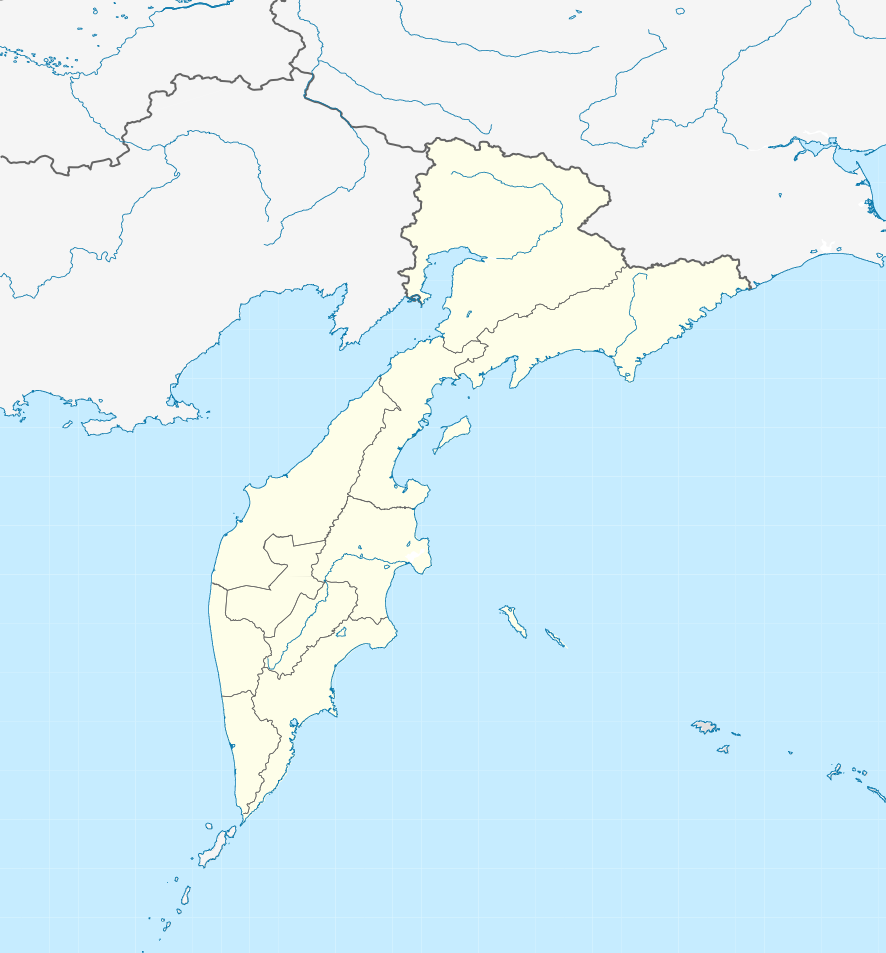
- Location within Russia Location within Kamchatka Krai
- Coordinates: 54°47′28″N 167°34′39″E
- Country: Soviet Union
- Soviet republic: Russian SFSR
- Oblast: Kamchatka
- District: Aleutsky

Preobrazhenskoye (Russian: Преображе́нское) was a village (selo) in Aleutsky District of Kamchatka Oblast, Russian SFSR, Soviet Union, located on Medny Island in the Commander Islands group east of the Kamchatka Peninsula.

The village was founded in the 19th century by Aleut (Unangan) settlers from Attu Island in the Aleutian Islands. They were engaged in whaling and sealing with harpoons and spears. Fishing and hunting of whales and other marine mammals were the mainstay of the economy there.

To reportedly 'accelerate economic progress' of the Commander Islands, the entire population of the village was moved to Nikolskoye on Bering Island. The village was abolished in November 1977 and has remained uninhabited ever since.

== See also ==
- Nikolskoye, Kamchatka Krai, a larger village on Bering Island
