= Komandorsky Nature Reserve =

Strict nature reserve in Kamchatka Krai, Russia

- IUCN category Ia (strict nature reserve)
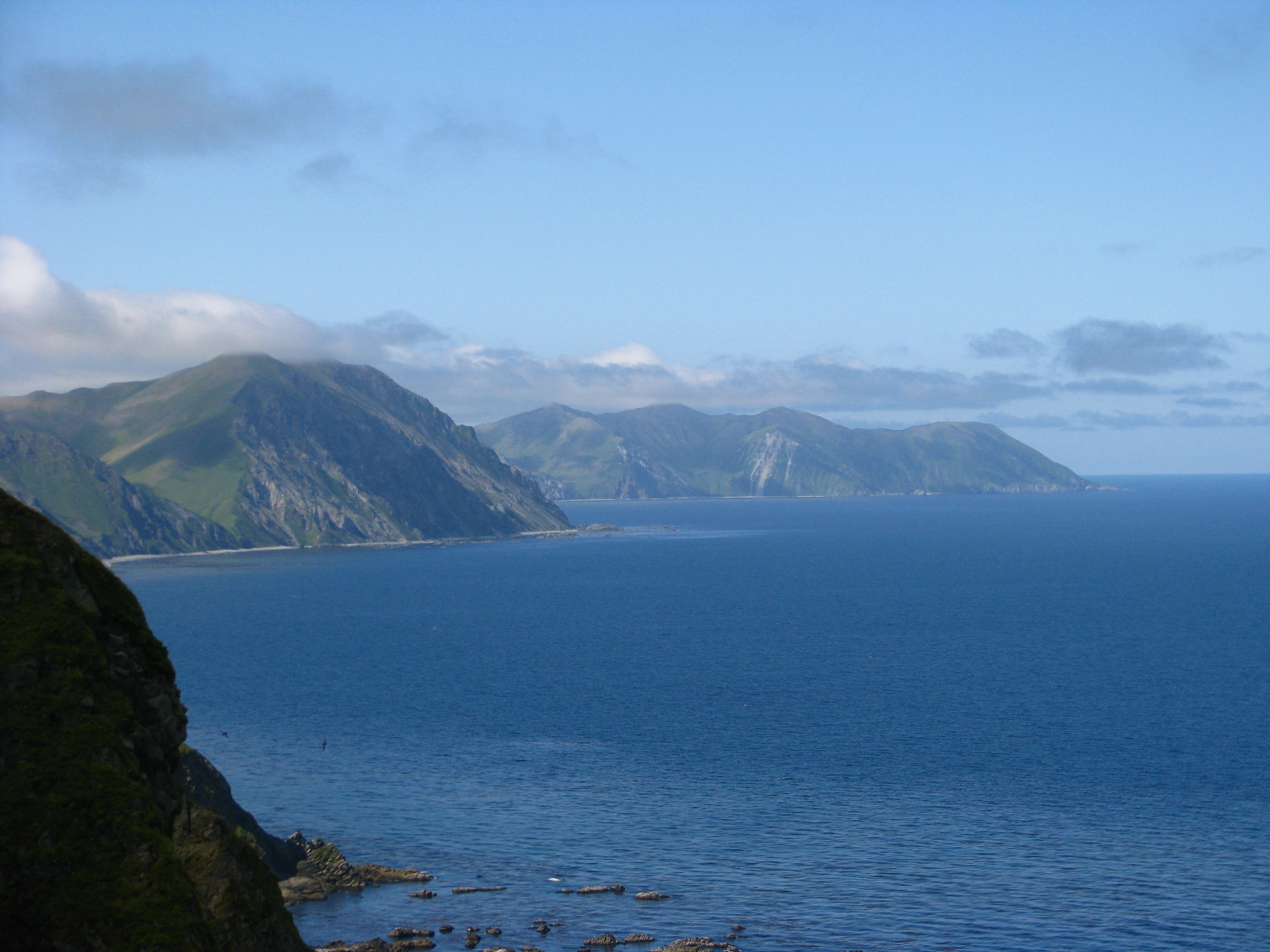
- Medny Island

- Location within Russia
- Location: Komandorski Islands, Kamchatka Krai, Russia
- Nearest city: Nikolskoye
- Coordinates: 54°00′00″N 166°00′00″E
- Area: 3,648,679 ha (9,016,080 acres)
- Established: 1993
- Governing body: Center for Russian Nature Conservation

Komandorsky Nature Reserve (Russian: Командо́рский госуда́рственный биосфе́рный запове́дник) is a zapovednik (nature reserve) located on the Commander Islands, Kamchatka Krai, Russia.

The total area of the preserve is 3,648,679 ha (36,486.79 km^{2}) of which 2,177,398 ha (21,774 km^{2}) constitute a marine buffer zone. The land territory includes most of Bering Island, all of Medny Island, as well as thirteen smaller islands and rocks. It was created in 1993 to protect the ecosystems of the Commander Islands and the surrounding marine waters of the Bering Sea and northern Pacific Ocean.

Because of its isolation and the productivity of the Bering Sea and the Pacific continental shelf, the reserve is marked by a diversity of animal life. It is a refuge for over a million seabirds, several hundred thousand northern fur seals, several thousand Steller's sea lions, common seals, and spotted seals, a population of sea otter, some 21 whale species, two endemic subspecies of Arctic fox, and endangered or threatened migratory birds, such as the whooper swan, Steller's eider, and Steller's sea eagle.

Fishing is entirely prohibited within the 50 km (31 mi) buffer zone surrounding the preserve.

An additional stated purpose of the preserve is to foster the ecologically and culturally sustainable development of the only inhabited settlement on the Commander Islands, the village of Nikolskoye (pop. approximately 750 as of 2007).
