= Mednyj Aleut language =

Extinct mixed language of Bering Island

Mednyj Aleut
- Copper Island Creole, Copper Island Aleut
- Native to: Russia
- Region: Commander Islands
- Ethnicity: Alaskan Creoles of Medny Island
- Extinct: 5 October 2022, with the death of Gennady Yakovlev
- Language family: mixed Aleut–Russian

Language codes
- ISO 639-3: mud
- Glottolog: medn1235
- ELP: Copper Island Aleut

Mednyj Aleut (also called Copper Island Creole or Copper Island Aleut) is an extinct mixed language spoken on Bering Island. Mednyj Aleut is characterized by a blending of Russian and Aleut (primarily Attu) elements in most components of the grammar, but most profoundly in the verbal morphology. The Aleut component comprises the majority of the vocabulary, all the derivational morphology, part of the simple sentence syntax, nominal inflection and certain other grammatical means. The Russian components comprise verbal inflection, negation, infinitive forms, part of the simple sentence syntax and all of the compound sentence syntax.

== History ==
Originally, the language was spoken by Alaskan Creoles on Copper Island, from where it takes its name. The Alaskan Creoles are the descendants of promyshlenniki men employed by the Russian-American Company (RAC) and Aleut and Alutiiq women, and formed a small but influential population in Russian Alaska. They were bilingual in Russian and Aleut, and were defined as a high-status special social group by the RAC.

Due to increased contact with the Russian language in the 1940s, the majority of the population switched to using Russian instead of Mednyj Aleut. In 1970, the entire population of Medny Island was moved to Bering Island. It was spoken by two elderly speakers in Nikolskoe (Bering Island) until 2022.

== Phonology ==
=== Consonants ===
Mednyj Aleut's consonant inventory mostly consists of phonemes shared between Aleut and Russian. The aspirated sonorants /mʰ/, /nʰ/, /lʰ/ and /jʰ/, and the uvulars /χ/ and /ʁ/, come from Aleut and do not exist in Russian, while the labials, stops /p/ and /b/, and fricatives /f/ and /v/ come from Russian and do not exist in Aleut. Labials are mostly used in words of Russian origin, while aspirated sonorants are used only in native Aleut words.

Consonants of Mednyj Aleut
		Labial		Dental		Palatal		Velar	Uvular	Glottal
		plain	asp.	plain	asp.	plain	asp.	Velar	Uvular	Glottal
Plosive	voiceless	p		t		c		k	q	
Plosive	voiced	b		d						
Fricatives	voiceless	f				s ʃ		x	χ	
Fricatives	voiced	v				z ʒ		ɣ	ʁ	
Nasals		m	mʰ	n	nʰ			ŋ		
Liquids		w		r		j	jʰ			h
Laterals				l	lʰ					

=== Vowels ===
The vowel inventory of Mednyj Aleut contains three pairs of vowels from Aleut (/i/, /u/, /a/) and two pairs, /o/ and /e/, from Russian. Vowel length is preserved in Aleut loanwords, and vowels are also lengthened in the verbal inflectional endings borrowed from Russian.

Vowels of Mednyj Aleut
	Front	Central	Back
Close	i iː		u uː
Mid	e eː		o oː
Open		a aː	

== Syntax ==
Mednyj Aleut has a heavily Russian-influenced syntax. In particular, it has a relatively free word order in comparison to Aleut, which is strictly SOV. However, when the direct object in a sentence is a personal pronoun or when an adjunct in a sentence is an Aleut word, SOV word order is used.

on hixtaa-l ni-but timas agítal ayx̂acaa-t'
he say-PAST no-will.3SG us with go-INF
'He said that he would not go with us.'

Russian complementizers, conjunctions and many wh-words are also used:

agitaayani-ƞ u min'a katorəye agítaki abaa-l pucti huzúƞi ax̂salaa-l-i
friends-my at me which with work-PAST almost all die-PAST-PL
'Of my friends with whom I worked, almost all are dead.'

Additionally, negation is similar to Russian: the Russian prefix ni- is used as the negative suffix and the phrase netu/nitu(ka) ('there is no') is used as a special negative existential construction.

ani ni-saxtazaa-yut
they not-lazy-PRES.3PL
'They are not lazy.'

ya ni-bud-u iĝataa-t'
I not-will-1SG hurry-INF
'I will not hurry.'

saalugula-x̂ ilasa-kali-l-i, saalugula-x̂-ta niitu
rain-NMLZ wait-start-PAST-PL rain-NMLZ-EMPH there.is.no
'We started to wait for rain, but there is no rain.'

Like Russian, Mednyj Aleut does not use copulas in the present tense. The verb 'to be' is the Aleut word 'u-', but Russian verbal inflections are used for it. For example, 'uu-it' means 'is' and 'uu-l-i' means 'were'. The copula is only used in past tense when the predicate is nominal. When the predicate is adjectival, the predicate is inflected for the past tense like a verb is.

tátka-ƞ u min'a aleuuta-x̂ uu-l
father-my at me Aleut was-PAST
'My father was Aleut.'

ya cuquyaa-l-a
I small-PAST-FEM
'I was small.'

i vúsim sútuk saalugula-x̂ ni-bil-a
and eight days rain not-be.PAST-FEM
'And for eight days there was no rain.'

== Morphology ==
=== Nouns ===
The derivational and inflectional morphology of nouns in Mednyj Aleut comes from Aleut. Notably, Mednyj Aleut contains morphological categories that do not exist in Russian, such as duality. 61.5% of nouns in Mednyj Aleut are of Aleut origin, with the rest coming from Russian.

	Singular	Dual	Plural
	-x̂	-x	-ƞ, -s
1SG	-ƞ	-ki-ƞ	-ni-ƞ
2SG	-n	-ki-n	-t
1PL	-mis	-ki	-mis
2PL	-ci	-ki	-ci

=== Verbs ===
The finite, infinitive and the majority of the nonfinite forms of verbs are of Russian origin while the nominal inflectional morphology is of Aleut origin. For example, this table compares selected finite verb forms for the verb 'to work' between the Bering Island dialect of Aleut, Mednyj Aleut and Russian. The Russian-origin influences are added to the verb stem, which is of Aleut origin. 94% of verbs in the Mednyj Aleut lexicon are of Aleut origin, with a minority coming from Russian. Mednyj Aleut is characterized as considerably more agglutinative than Russian, which is generally considered fusional.

		Bering Island Aleut	Mednyj Aleut	Russian
Present	1SG	awa-ku-q	aba-ju	rabota-ju
	2SG	awa-ku-x̂t	aba-iš	rabota-eš'
	3G	awa-ku-x̂	aba-it	rabota-et
	1PL	awa-ku-s	aba-im	rabota-em
	2PL	awa-ku-x̂t-xičix	aba-iti	rabota-ete
Past	3SG	awa-na-x̂		
	MSG		aba-l	rabota-l
Future	3SG	awa-ƞan ana-x̂	bud-it aba-t'	bud-et rabota-t'
Imperative	2SG	awa-ʒa	aba-j	rabota-j

== See also ==
- Chinook Jargon
- Haida Jargon
- Kyakhta Russian–Chinese Pidgin
- Ninilchik
- Nootka Jargon
- Russenorsk
