= Aleutic =

Aleutic may refer to:

- Aleutic people or Aleuts, a people who live in the transition zone between Russia and Alaska, and the Bering Sea area
- Aleutic language or Aleutic, the language of the Aleuts
- Aleutic Islands (Aleutics), a.k.a. Aleutian Islands, an archipelago linking Alaska to Kamchatka, the southern bound of the Bering Sea
- Alaska Peninsula a.k.a. Aleutic Peninsula, a peninsula that links mainland Alaska to the Aleutian Islands
- Aleutsky District or Aleutic District, Kamchatka Krai, Russian Far East, Russia

== See also ==
- Alutiiq people, a people found on the Aleutic-Alaska Peninsula and Kodiak Island Archipelago
- Alutiiq language, the language spoken by the Alutiiq people
