= Admiral Kuznetsov =

Admiral Kuznetsov may refer to:

- Nikolay Kuznetsov (officer) (1904–1974), former Commander-in-Chief of the Soviet Navy
- Russian aircraft carrier Admiral Kuznetsov

== See also ==
- Kuznetsov-class aircraft carriers, named after the Admiral Kuznetsov
- Admiral Kuznetsov Strait, Bering Sea
