= Kamen Ariy =

Island in the Bering Sea, part of Commander Islands

Камень Арий
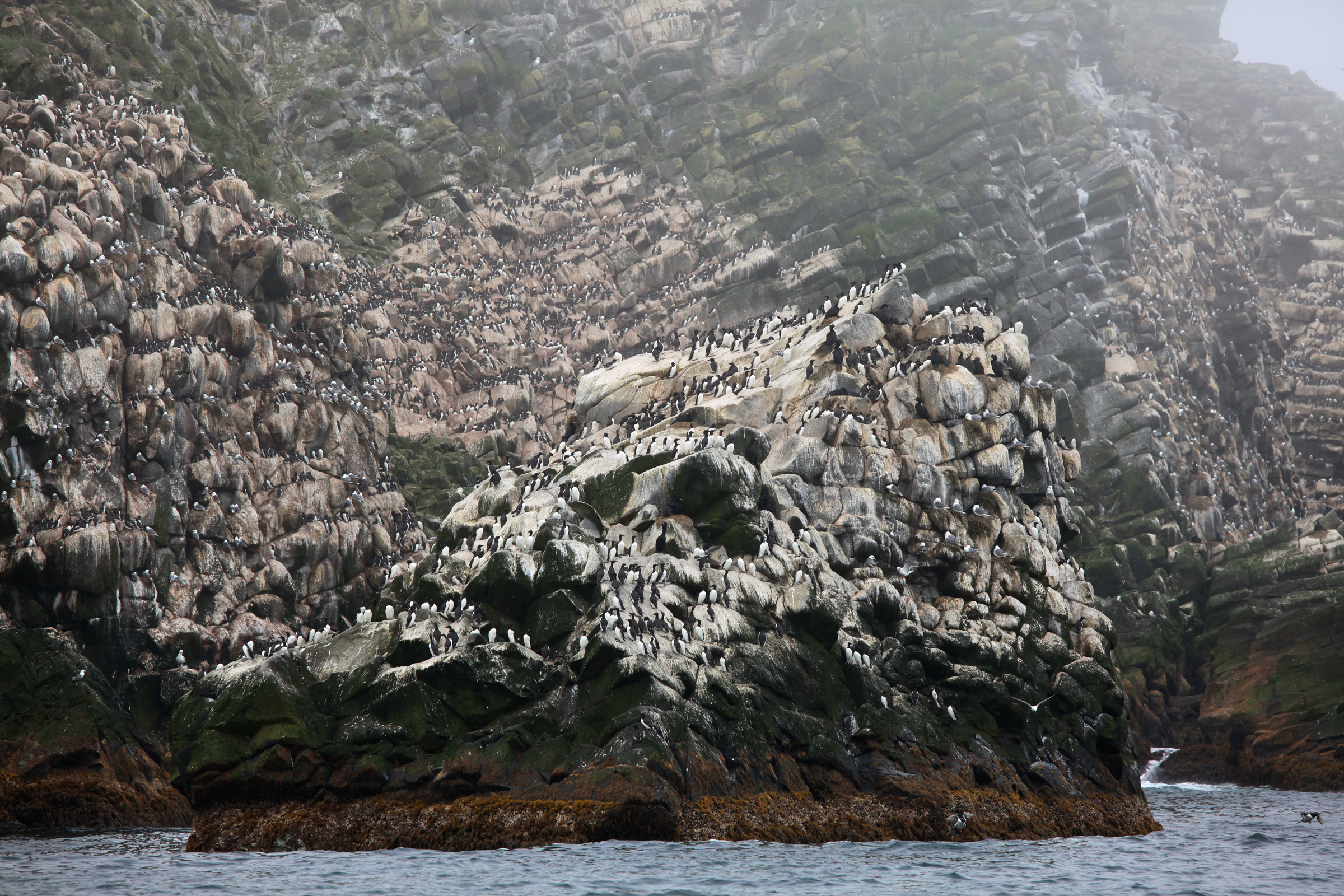
- Birds seen on the islet

- Location within Russia

Geography
- Coordinates: 55.2150°N 165.7908°E
- Adjacent to: North Pacific Ocean
- Highest point: 45 m

Administration
- Russia
- Krai: Aleutsky District

Demographics
- Population: Uninhabited

Kamen Ariy (Russian: Камень Арий), or Ary Rock, is an uninhabited islet of the Commander Islands in the North Pacific Ocean, east of the Kamchatka Peninsula in Eastern Russia. These islands belong to the Kamchatka Krai of the Russian Federation. Described as "craggy" by Encyclopædia Britannica, Kamen Ariy is about 8 kilometres (5 miles) west of Tufted Puffin Rock and consists of two rocks. The northern rock is pointed and reaches a height of 45 m (150 ft). The southern rock is much flatter and only reaches a height of 2.1 metres (6 feet 11 inches).

The islands were first named as Novy Island (Новый) by naval officer Otto von Kotzebue in 1824. Three years later, the islet was visited by explorer Friedrich Benjamin von Lütke and was named Sivuchy (Сивучьим). It was finally named Ariy in 1848 due to the amount of murress (Russian: ары) that took rest on the islet. Since 1883, the rock was designated as such on maps according to the Toponymic Dictionary of the North-East of the USSR. As part of the Commander Islands, its temperature averages 10 °C (50 °F) in August and −4 °C (25 °F) in February. The islet's precipitation averages about 500 centimetres (200 inches) each year.

Since 1983, the islet was designated as a Protected Area of Russia on 28 December of that year and is part of the Commander Islands State Nature Biosphere Reserve. It gained protected status due to the islet hosting multiple animal species on its surface, which include: seventeen protected species of birds, sea lions, harbour seals, spotted seals, northern fur seals and sea otters.
