= Haida Jargon =

Haida-based pidgin of Canada

- Native to: X̱aayda Gwaay (Haida Gwaii)
- Era: 1830s
- Language family: Haida-based pidgin

Language codes
- ISO 639-3: None (mis)
- Glottolog: None

In the 1830s a pidgin trade language based on Haida, known as Haida Jargon, was used in the islands by speakers of English, Haida, Coast Tsimshian, and Heiltsuk.

== See also ==
- Nootka Jargon
- Chinook Jargon
- Medny Aleut language
