= Nootka Jargon =

Extinct form of Nuu-chah-nulth of western Canada used for trade purposes

- Native to: Canada
- Region: Pacific Northwest
- Native speakers: None
- Language family: Nuučaan̓uł-based pidgin

Language codes
- ISO 639-3: None (mis)
- Glottolog: None

Nootka Jargon or Nootka Lingo was a pidginized form of the Wakashan language Nuučaan̓uł, used for trade purposes by the indigenous peoples of the Pacific Northwest Coast, when communicating with persons who did not share any common language. It was most notably in use during the late 18th and early 19th centuries and was likely one precursor to Chinook Wawa, in Chinook Wawa's post-contact-form. A small number of words from Nuučaan̓uł (formerly called the Nootka language, thus the English names of its pidgin) form an important portion of the lexical core of Chinook Wawa. This was true, both in Chinook Wawa's post-contact pidgin phase, and its latter creole form, and remains true in contemporary Chinuk Wawa language usage.

== Early origins ==
It is believed by theorists that Nootka Sound was a traditional trading hub for coastal First Nations groups long before contact with Europeans. Russian and Spanish ships are believed to have been among the first colonizers to reach the west coast of Vancouver Island, followed closely by the British who anchored at Yuquot (a.k.a. Friendly Cove) in 1788. There is at least one account of British and Spanish interpreters learning Nootka Jargon, which consisted mostly of nuučaan̓uɫ words, but also took words, such as sail and stow from the Europeans with whom trade and interaction were occurring.

== Documentation ==
These sources state that Early European mercantilists, operating in the region, created word lists for the jargon; most notably, Captain James Cook documented 268 lexical items in his journal. John Jewitt also listed 87 vocabulary words, along with definitions in English, in his 1815 publication of A Narrative of the Adventures and Sufferings of John R. Jewitt, only survivor of the crew of the ship Boston, during a captivity of nearly three years among the savages of Nootka Sound: with an account of the manners, mode of living, and religious opinions of the natives.

== Relation to Chinook Wawa ==
Nootka Jargon was the principal medium of communication between the Europeans and First Nations people for 20–30 years. It is argued the colonizers used this simplified version of Nuučaan̓uł, which they had become familiar with through maritime trade, when they continued their journeys down the Pacific Northwest Coast towards the mouth of the Columbia River. About 5% of the Chinook Wawa lexicon originates in Nuučaan̓uł words, though the word-frequency for words of Nuučaan̓uł origin is higher in everyday Chinook Wawa speech and text. As to be expected when nonnative speakers are the language brokers of a contact language form, there were significant phonological changes (see below), as well as a few morphological discrepancies in the way that words of Nuučaan̓uł origin entered the post-contact form of Chinuk Wawa.

== Linguistic features ==
As referenced above, theorists suggest that the words of Nuučaan̓uł origin found in post-contact Chinook Wawa were introduced by Europeans who had never learned to speak the full Nuučaan̓uł language. This is evidenced by predictably systematic changes found in Chinook Wawa that differ from the original Nuučaan̓uł language forms. These systemic changes would logically be made by native speakers of Indo-European languages, in this case, principally English and French speakers. These include the replacement, of glottalized ejectives, uvular stops and fricatives, and the velar fricative, with consonants found in the sound inventories of English and French, such as /b/, /d/, /g/, and /ʃ/.

== See also ==
- Haida Jargon
- Chinook Jargon
- Medny Aleut language
