= Aleutsky District =

Aleutsky District Алеутский район (Russian)
- District
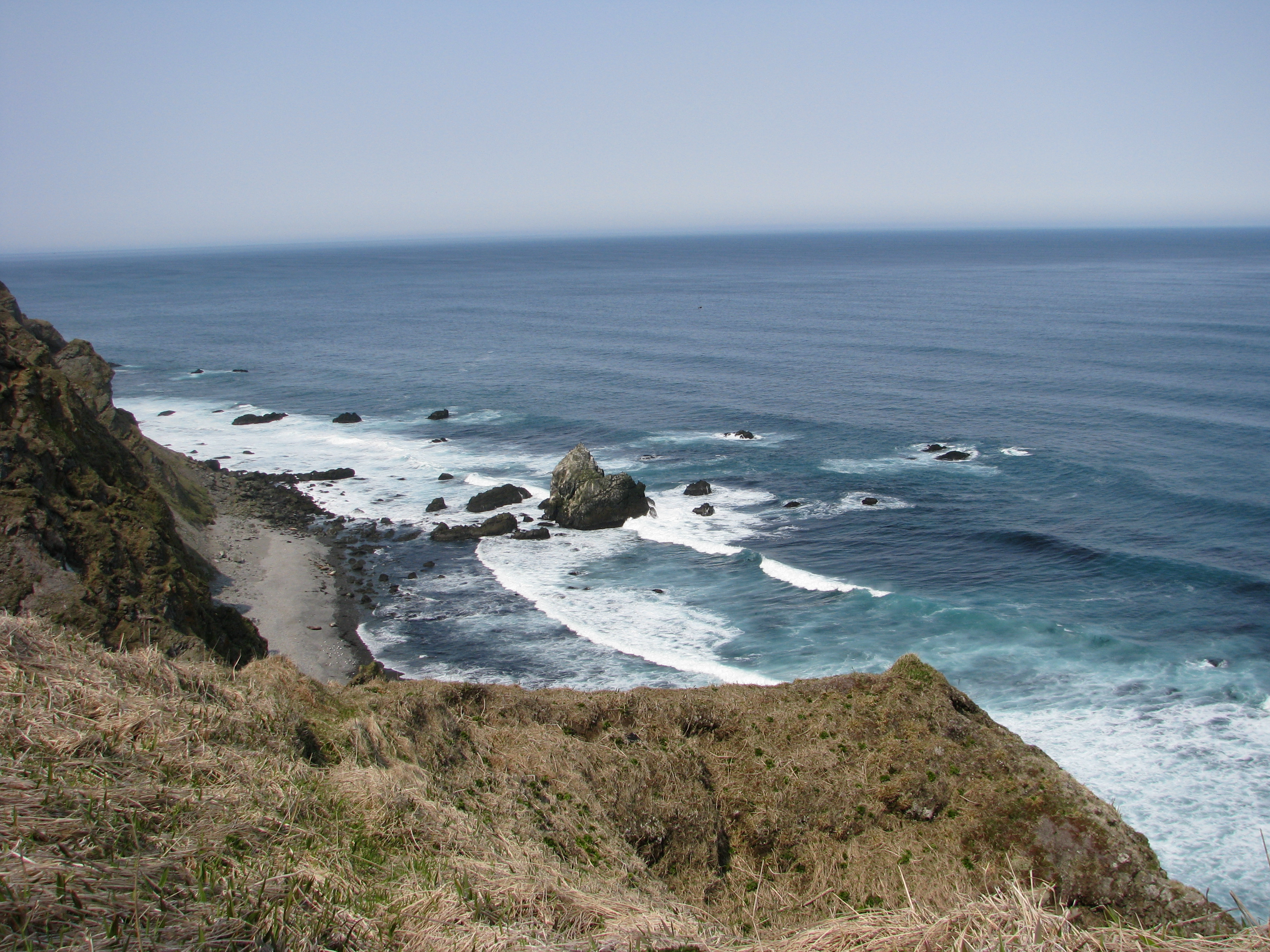
- Komandorsky Nature Reserve, Aleutsky District

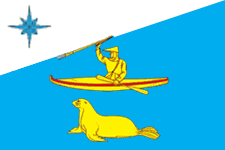
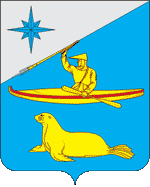
- Flag Coat of arms
- Location of Aleutsky District in Kamchatka Krai
- Coordinates: 55°12′N 165°58′E
- Country: Russia
- Federal subject: Kamchatka Krai
- Administrative center: Nikolskoye

Area
  - Total: 1,580 km^{2} (610 sq mi)

Population (2010 Census)
  - Total: 676
  - Density: 0.428/km^{2} (1.11/sq mi)
  - Urban: 0%
  - Rural: 100%

Administrative structure
  - Inhabited localities: 1 rural localities

Municipal structure
  - Municipally incorporated as: Aleutsky Municipal District
  - Municipal divisions: 0 urban settlements, 1 rural settlements
- Time zone: UTC+12 (MSK+9)
- OKTMO ID: 30601000
- Website: http://aleut-admin.ru/

Aleutsky District (Russian: Алеу́тский райо́н) is an administrative and municipal district of Kamchatka Krai, Russia, one of the eleven in the krai. It is located to the east of the Kamchatka Peninsula on the Commander Islands. The area of the district is 1,580 square kilometers (610 sq mi). The islands consist of Bering Island, Medny Island and fifteen much smaller ones, the largest of which are Tufted Puffin Rock, 15 hectares, and Kamen Ariy, which are between 3 km and 13 km west of the only settlement, Nikolskoye. Its administrative center is the rural locality of Nikolskoye.

== History ==
Bering Island was discovered by Vitus Bering in 1741 during the Great Northern Expedition. The Soviet Union established control over the Commander Islands in 1923. The Aleutsky District was formed, with Nikolskoye as its administrative centre, on 10 January 1932.

== Geography ==
Located within the federal subject of Kamchatka Krai, the district is on the Aleutian Islands in the Bering Sea. It includes an archipelago of 15 islands, with the largest being Bering Island. The total size of the district is 1,425.67 square kilometers (550.45 sq mi).

== Weather ==
The average annual wind speed in the district is 7.1 m/sec and for 80% of the year wind speeds are over 15 m/sec. The average annual precipitation on Medny Island in 788 mm and on Bering Island it is 470 mm. The average number of day per year with snowstorms is 45 and the number of foggy days per year is 60.

== Government ==
As of 2025, Svetlana Vasilievna Arnatskaya is the head of the Aleutian Municipal District; she was elected to the position in 2022. Galina Leonidovna Korolyova is the chair of the Aleutian Municipal District's Duma.

== Demographics ==
According to Demoscope Weekly, the Aleutsky District had a total population of 1,356 in the 1989 Soviet census, with 686 being male and 670 being female. Its population declined to 808 (2002 census); and then to 676 (2010 census);

== Works cited ==
- "История". Aleutsky District. Archived from the original on 2 July 2023.
- "Арнацкая Светлана Васильевна". Aleutsky District. Archived from the original on 9 July 2023.
- "Алеутский муниципальный округ в Камчатском крае - общая информация". Aleutsky District. Archived from the original on 16 June 2025.
- "Всесоюзная перепись населения 1989 г. Численность населения СССР, РСФСР и ее территориальных единиц по полу". Demoscope Weekly. Archived from the original on 16 June 2025.
- "Структура". Aleutsky District. Archived from the original on 1 June 2025.
