= Nikolskoye, Kamchatka Krai =

Selo in Aleutsky District, Kamchatka Krai, Russia

Nikolskoye Никольское
- Selo
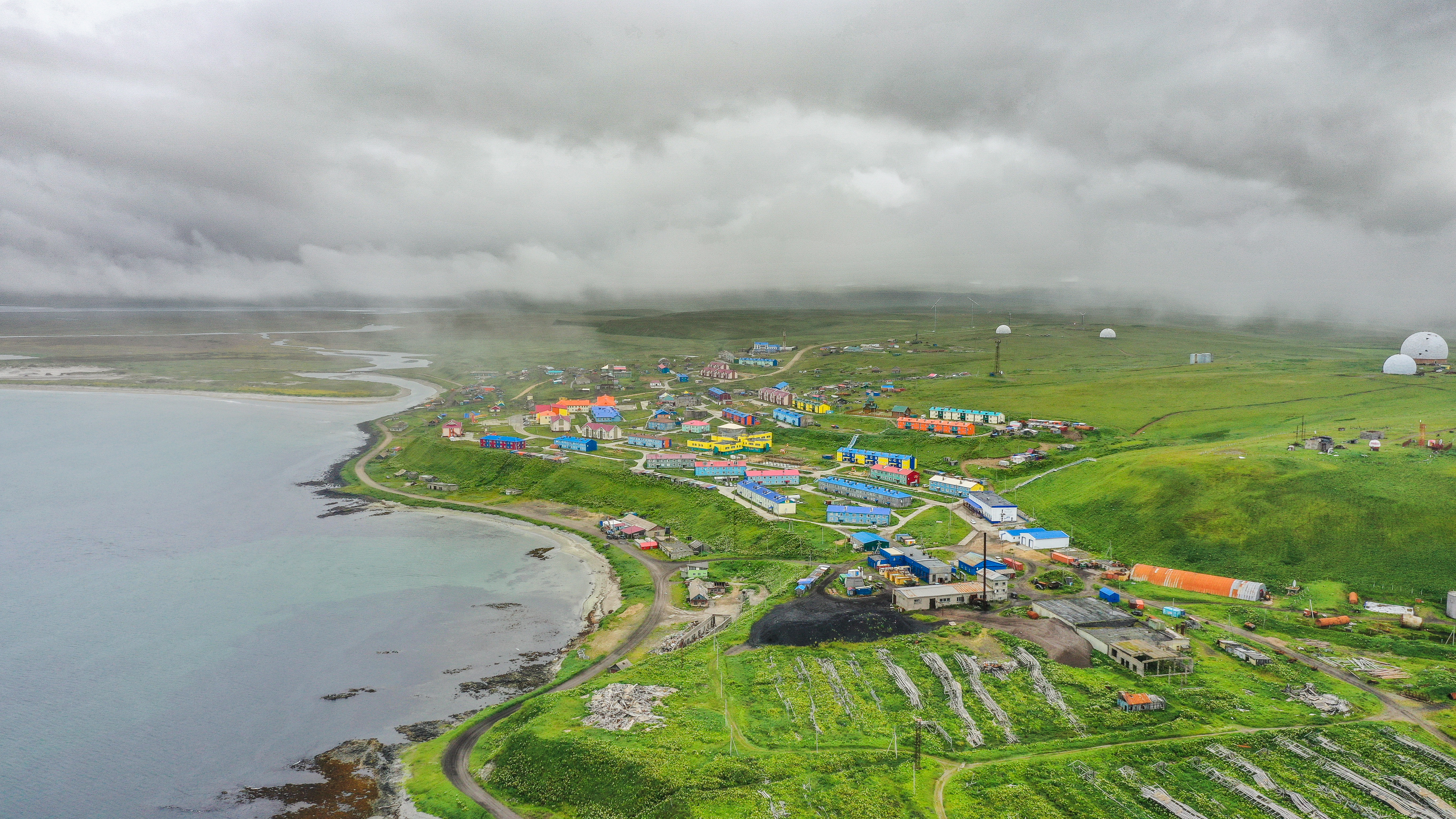
- View of Nikolskoye

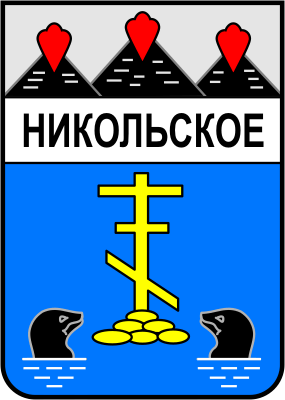
- Coat of arms
- Interactive map of Nikolskoye
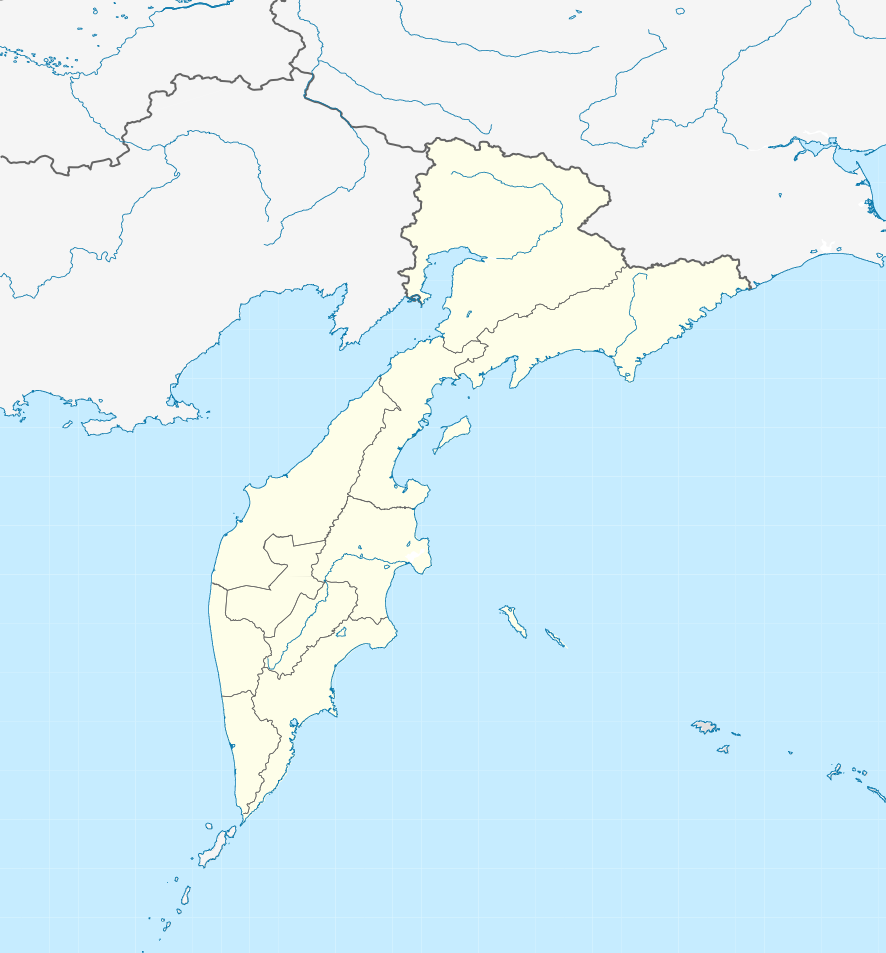
- Location of Nikolskoye Nikolskoye (Kamchatka Krai)
- Coordinates: 55°11′51″N 165°59′51″E
- Country: Russia
- Federal subject: Kamchatka Krai
- Administrative district: Aleutsky District
- Founded: 1826
- Elevation: 6 m (20 ft)

Population (2010 Census)
  - Total: 676
  - Estimate (2025): 611 (−9.6%)

Administrative status
  - Capital of: Aleutsky District

Municipal status
  - Municipal district: Aleutsky Municipal District
  - Rural settlement: Nikolskoye Rural Settlement
- Time zone: UTC+12 (MSK+9)
- Postal code: 684500
- Dialing code: +7 41547
- OKTMO ID: 30601401101

Nikolskoye (Russian: Нико́льское; Aleut: Никоольскиӽ, romanized: Nikoolskix̂) is a rural locality (a selo) and the administrative center of Aleutsky District of Kamchatka Krai, Russia, located on Bering Island in the Commander Islands chain. Population: 676 (2010 census); 808 (2002 census); 1,356 (1989 Soviet census). It is the only remaining inhabited locality in the district.

== History ==
It was founded in 1826 by Aleut (Unangan) settlers from Atka Island in the Aleutian Islands who were brought there by Russian fur traders. While engaging to some extent in the traditional pursuits of whaling and sealing with harpoons and spears, they were primarily employed in the harvest of fur-bearing animals, notably sea otters and fur seals.

== Demographics ==
Currently, the population is divided roughly evenly between Russians and Aleuts, but mixing between the two is common.

== Economy ==
The current economy is based primarily on fishing, especially the harvest of salmon caviar, mushroom gathering, and government services and subsidies. Despite living in an environment that is extremely rich with wildlife, the inhabitants of the island are very restricted in the use of these resources since almost the entire island is a nature preserve. In the years following the dissolution of the Soviet Union, poaching of fish, Arctic fox, reindeer (which were introduced to the island), and migratory waterfowl was widespread, but there is virtually no harvest of marine mammals due to strict protection.

== Transportation ==
Nikolskoye is served by the Nikolskoye Airport.

== Climate ==
Like the rest of Kamchatka Krai, Nikolskoye has a subarctic climate (Dfc), though the ocean makes temperatures much less extreme than interior Siberia, with winters being about four degrees milder than in Petropavlovsk-Kamchatsky. The transition to the subpolar oceanic climate of southwest Alaska to the east is very apparent, especially in the extremely low sunshine hours, which average only around 2.8 per day due to the consistent fog from the Aleutian Low and the Oyashio Current on its western flank. Extreme temperatures have ranged from −23.5 to 21.4 °C (−10.3 to 70.5 °F), with the latter occurring as recently as June 30, 1938.

Climate data for Bering Island (1899–2018) (Climate ID:32618)
| Month | Jan | Feb | Mar | Apr | May | Jun | Jul | Aug | Sep | Oct | Nov | Dec | Year |
|---|---|---|---|---|---|---|---|---|---|---|---|---|---|
| Record high °C (°F) | 5.4 (41.7) | 5.1 (41.2) | 8.8 (47.8) | 10.2 (50.4) | 13.6 (56.5) | 21.5 (70.7) | 21.4 (70.5) | 21.0 (69.8) | 18.5 (65.3) | 12.7 (54.9) | 9.2 (48.6) | 7.4 (45.3) | 21.5 (70.7) |
| Mean maximum °C (°F) | 2.4 (36.3) | 2.0 (35.6) | 3.1 (37.6) | 4.7 (40.5) | 8.7 (47.7) | 12.6 (54.7) | 17.0 (62.6) | 17.1 (62.8) | 14.9 (58.8) | 10.8 (51.4) | 6.6 (43.9) | 3.4 (38.1) | 18.3 (64.9) |
| Mean daily maximum °C (°F) | −1.7 (28.9) | −1.7 (28.9) | −0.4 (31.3) | 1.3 (34.3) | 4.7 (40.5) | 7.7 (45.9) | 11.3 (52.3) | 13.3 (55.9) | 11.8 (53.2) | 7.2 (45.0) | 2.8 (37.0) | −0.5 (31.1) | 4.6 (40.4) |
| Daily mean °C (°F) | −3.2 (26.2) | −3.4 (25.9) | −1.9 (28.6) | −0.1 (31.8) | 2.9 (37.2) | 5.9 (42.6) | 9.6 (49.3) | 11.7 (53.1) | 10.3 (50.5) | 5.7 (42.3) | 1.4 (34.5) | −2 (28) | 3.1 (37.5) |
| Mean daily minimum °C (°F) | −5.3 (22.5) | −5.4 (22.3) | −3.8 (25.2) | −1.6 (29.1) | 1.5 (34.7) | 4.6 (40.3) | 8.3 (46.9) | 10.4 (50.7) | 8.7 (47.7) | 3.9 (39.0) | −0.4 (31.3) | −3.9 (25.0) | 1.4 (34.6) |
| Mean minimum °C (°F) | −11.5 (11.3) | −11.9 (10.6) | −10.2 (13.6) | −5.9 (21.4) | −1.2 (29.8) | 1.7 (35.1) | 5.5 (41.9) | 7.0 (44.6) | 4.2 (39.6) | −0.7 (30.7) | −5.7 (21.7) | −9.2 (15.4) | −13.0 (8.6) |
| Record low °C (°F) | −21 (−6) | −23.5 (−10.3) | −21.9 (−7.4) | −13.9 (7.0) | −9.6 (14.7) | −2.3 (27.9) | −0.5 (31.1) | −0.1 (31.8) | −2.9 (26.8) | −8.5 (16.7) | −15.4 (4.3) | −19.9 (−3.8) | −23.5 (−10.3) |
| Average precipitation mm (inches) | 81.3 (3.20) | 53.9 (2.12) | 50.8 (2.00) | 52.6 (2.07) | 79.0 (3.11) | 50.3 (1.98) | 54.9 (2.16) | 96.3 (3.79) | 67.3 (2.65) | 84.3 (3.32) | 69.1 (2.72) | 67.8 (2.67) | 807.6 (31.79) |
| Average precipitation days (≥ 1.0 mm) | 13.8 | 12.7 | 11.4 | 9.6 | 7.7 | 6.2 | 7.6 | 10.4 | 10.8 | 14.2 | 15.0 | 15.1 | 134.5 |
| Mean monthly sunshine hours | 31.0 | 56.5 | 99.2 | 120.0 | 102.3 | 84.0 | 74.4 | 108.5 | 123.0 | 111.6 | 54.0 | 27.9 | 992.4 |
Source 1: Sistema de Clasificación Bioclimática Mundial
Source 2: allmetsat.com (sunshine only)

== Religion ==
The first church of Nikolskoye was dedicated to Saint Nicholas and Saint Innocent of Irkutsk, the Enlightener of Siberia. It was built in 1799 by the Russian-American Company. The second building was dedicated in the 1890s and closed after the October Revolution. It was then used as a local club, then a hostel. The building burned down in 1983. A new church was built in the center of the village, a location not subject to tsunamis. It was built in Petropavlovsk-Kamchatsky, dismantled, shipped to the island and reassembled in September 2012.

== See also ==
- Preobrazhenskoye, Kamchatka Oblast, a village which existed on Medny Island
