= Promyshlenniki =

Professional hunters in historical Siberia and Russian America

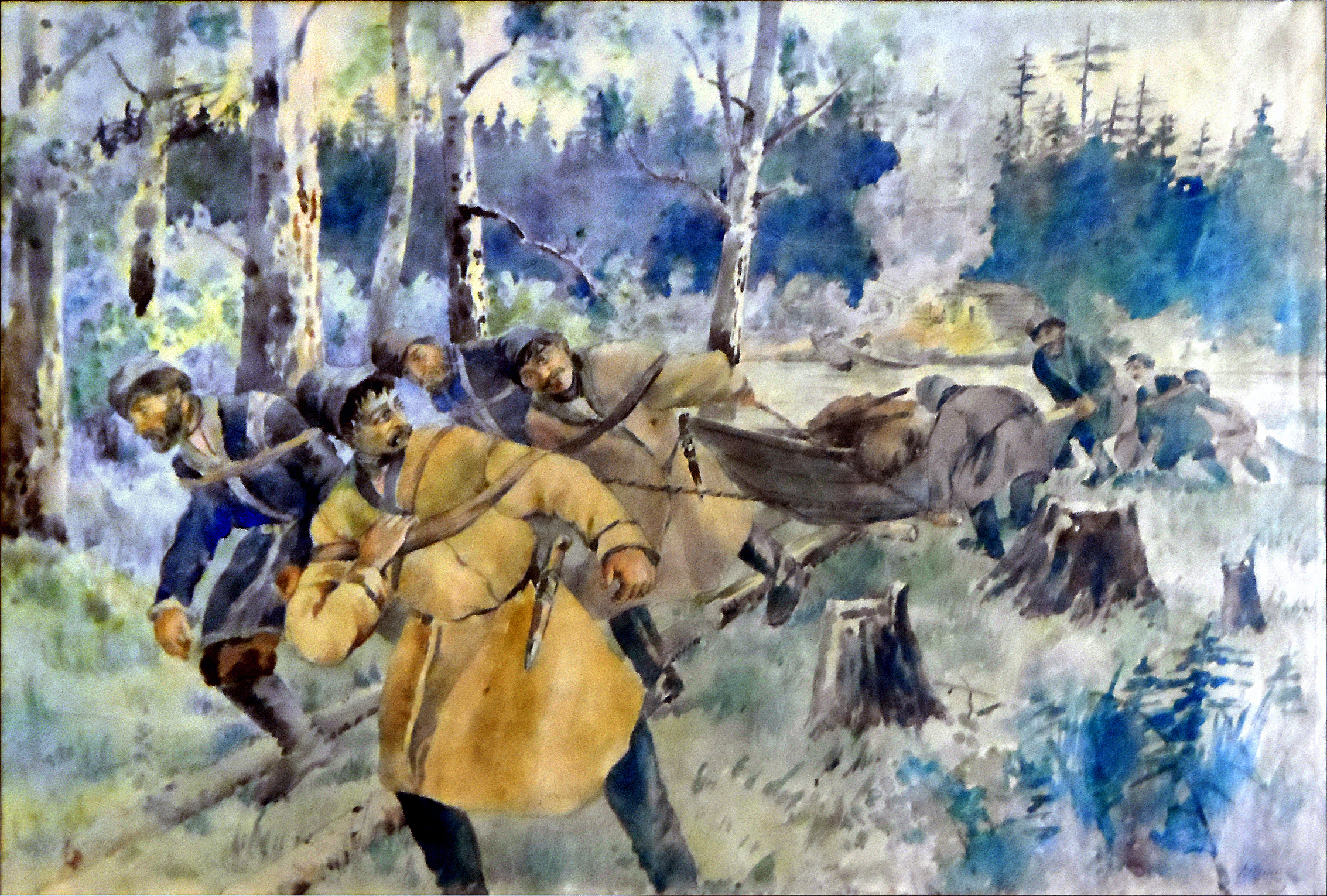
Advance of the promyshlenniki to the East

The promyshlenniki (Russian: промышленники, sg. промышленник, promyshlennik) (Note: The word промышленник in this meaning is dated in the modern Russian language: since Karamzin introduced the neologism promyshlennost (промышленность) as a purist equivalent of industry, the word promyshlennik has been reinterpreted as 'industrialist', now chiefly used in the context of 19th and pre-revolutionary 20th century Russia. Nowadays hunter or fur trapper in Siberia would be called промысловик (promyslovik).) were Russian and Indigenous Siberian artel members, or self-employed workers drawn largely from the state serf and townsman class who engaged in the Siberian, maritime, and later fur trades.

Initially, the Russians in Russian America were Siberian fur-hunters, river-merchants, and mercenaries, although many later worked as sailors, carpenters, artisans, and craftsmen. The promyshlenniki formed the backbone of Russian trading-operations in Russian Alaska. Some of them worked on preliminary request contracts, including for the Russian-American Company, and their duties and activities became less involved in the company's fur-gathering activities.

== Siberia ==
Initially, the phenomenon arose in the Novgorod Republic. In the Novgorod dialect, they are called povolnik (Russian: повольник), a person who is not bound by constant obligations with any guild, principality, city, monastery, diocese or boyar. Their region of activity was Perm, the Irtysh River, and Northwestern Siberia.

Following the Russian conquest of Siberia, as a part of the regional fur trade, the opportunities offered by this newly available luxury product drew many Russians eager to make a profit in newly conquered territories. Service-men that arrived, rarely able to receive a stable salary from the state. Merchants began to visit the Russian settlements, interested in selling the gathered furs at various markets. The promyshlenniki were free men who made their living any way they could. When petitioning the tsar, a service-man would call himself 'your Kholop' and a promyshlennik 'your orphan'. These people were often called Cossacks, because they did not pay any personal taxes to the state. They paid only the trading tariff, and were required to participate in wars with their weapons and ammunition, food and fodder, similarly to American rangers.

As the Russian Empire expanded its bureaucratic network into Siberia, Russian colonists were able to be placed under Imperial regulations. Fur operations ran by promyshlenniki were altered with the oversight by the officials, as they now had to "bring all his catch or his purchase to the town in proper season, submit his furs to the tsar's agents for sorting, appraisal, and taxation (usually, as we noted, 10 per cent). He must not trade with natives except in the town and then only in certain seasons; he must not ply natives with liquor; he must return his remaining furs to European Russia along approved routes and submit them to continual inspection." The fierce competition between promyshlenniki led to the overexploitation of sable populations, continually forcing them to go further east. With the decline of European demand for sable furs at the end of the 17th century, so did its price; making many promyshlenniki partake in caravans headed to the Qing Empire, or selling their furs the border town of Kyakhta. Promyshlovik began to gather sable pelts located in the Amur basin during the early 17th century. Trappers based out of Nerchinsk regularly crossed the Qing border into what became Russian Manchuria, or Outer Manchuria, by the 1730s to pursue sable populations residing there. Russian officials were aware of these operations, but "tolerated any breach of the Russian-Chinese treaties which might occur."

== Russian America ==
The Great Northern Expedition expanded Russian geographical knowledge to many of the Aleutian Islands and the mainland of Alaska from the Alaska Peninsula to near the later site of New Archangel. News of the many Sea otter populations along these lands quickly drew the attention of many Siberia-based promyshlenniki. Few had naval experience, though many began to travel the Bering Sea on kochs made from timber adjacent to the Sea of Okhotsk. The first Russian promyshlennik to travel east was Emelian Basov, who sailed to Bering Island in 1743. Promyshlenniki based out of Okhotsk or Petropavlovsk, made provisions for their yearly operations in the Aleutians by killing sea cows of the Commander Islands to extinction. The Sea otters of the Aleutians were progressively exploited by Russians, until by 1759 the Fox Islands were visited by Russian trappers. As these early trappers had "no knowledge of navigation", they consequently "took no observations, made no surveys..." and greatly limited geographical information for outsiders.

The Lebedev-Lastochkin Company sent the first Russian promyshlennik to investigate the resources of the lower Yukon River in 1790. The party, led by the hunter Ivanov, traveled from Iliamna Lake to the Kuskokwim and Yukon rivers. Ivanov reported on the extensive fish and game resources and the many people inhabiting the region. At first the traders returned to Kamchatka after every season but eventually trading posts were established in the territory. These posts began in the Aleutians and moved eastward toward the Alaska Peninsula rather than north to the Yukon delta and Bering Strait.

Many promyshlenniki became employees of the Russian-American Company (RAC) after it was established in 1799. Under the RAC promyshlenniki performed tasks such as hunting, supervision of sea otter hunting parties, carpentry, shipbuilding, farming and ranching at Fort Ross, California, guard duty, and a variety of other work. An example of an important RAC employee who was born into serfdom near Kursk, sold to the RAC, called a promyshlennik by the RAC, and played a key role in RAC expansion into California, was Timofei Nikitich Tarakanov.

=== Relations with Aleut and Alutiiq people ===
The promyshlenniki were adept at hunting on land but they lacked the skills to hunt on water, where sea otters lived. The promyshlenniki then turned to the native Aleut and Alutiiq men to do their hunting for them. These Alaska Natives were trained at a young age to hunt sea otters. The Russians took the women and children hostage and forced the men to hunt for them to ensure the safety of their families. The offspring of Russian men and Native women gave rise to a small but influential population of Alaskan Creoles.

=== Lifestyle ===
As time passed many of the Russian promyshlenniki took Aleut partners, had children, and adopted a native lifestyle during their time in the Aleutian Islands. In 1794, with direct authorization from Catherine II, the Siberian governor Ivan Pil sent instructions that managers of Shelikhov-Golikov Company at Kodiak Island should "encourage" single Russian men to marry native women. While the Vancouver Expedition was exploring the northern Pacific, the explorers visited several Russian fur posts. Joseph Whidbey visited a Lebedev-Lastochkin Company station at Tyonek, with Vancouver describing the promyshlenniki located there as:

[The Promyshlenniki appeared to be perfectly content to live after the manner of the Native indians of the country; partaking with equal relish and appetite their gros [sic] and nauseous food, adopting the same fashion, and using the same materials for their apparel, and differing from them in their exterior appearance only by the want of paint on their faces, and by their not wearing any of the Indian ornaments.

— George Vancouver 1794

== See also ==
- Awa'uq Massacre
- Mednyj Aleut language
- Zemleprokhodtsy
