= Commander Islands =

Russian islands in the Bering Sea

Commander Islands Командо́рские острова́ (Russian) Komandorskiye ostrova
- Settlement: Nikolskoye; 55°11′51″N 165°59′51″E
- Ethnic groups: Russians; Aleuts

Area
  - Total: 1,846 km^{2} (713 sq mi)

Population
  - 2009 estimate: 613

The Commander Islands, Komandorski Islands, or Komandorskie Islands (Russian: Командо́рские острова́, Komandorskiye ostrova) are a series of islands in the Russian Far East, a part of the Aleutian Islands, located about 175 km (109 mi) east of the Kamchatka Peninsula in the Bering Sea. Treeless and sparsely populated, the islands consist of Bering Island, 95 by 15 km (59 by 9 mi); Medny Island, 55 by 5 km (34 by 3 mi); and fifteen islets and rocks. The largest of the latter are Tufted Puffin Rock (Kamen Toporkov or Ostrov Toporkov), 15 ha (37 acres), and Kamen Ariy, which are between 3 and 13 km (2 and 8 mi) west of the only settlement, Nikolskoye. Administratively, the Commanders compose the Aleutsky District of the Kamchatka Krai in Russia.

In 2005, the Comandorsky State Nature Reserve was nominated for the List of World Heritage Sites in Russia of UNESCO.

== Geography ==
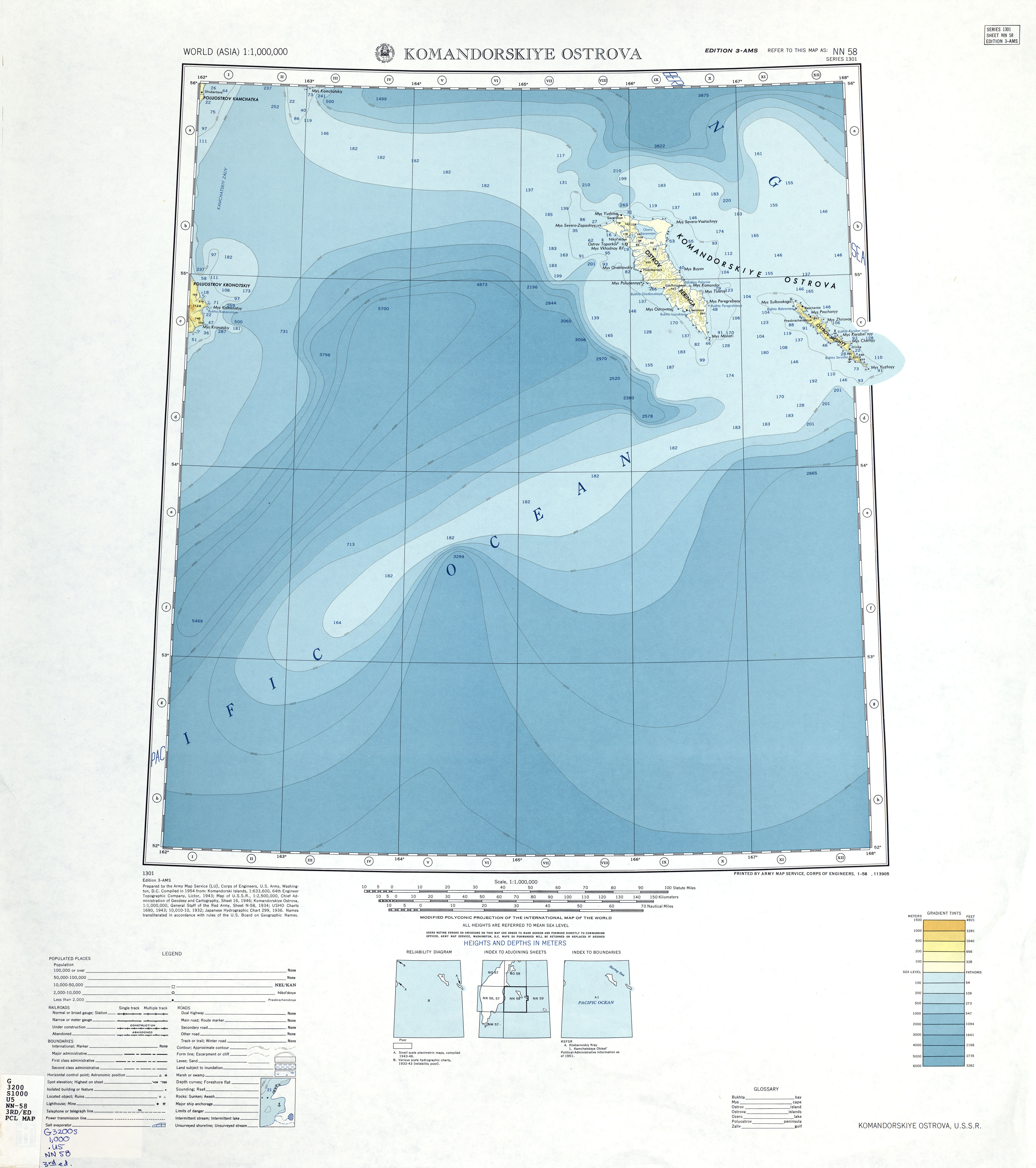
Detailed map including the Commander Islands

The Commander Islands archipelago consists of 15 islands and is a part of a submarine volcanic ridge extending from Alaska to Kamchatka dated by the beginning of Paleogene (60-70 million years ago). The islands are the westernmost of the Aleutian Islands, most of which are part of the US state of Alaska, and are separated from the closest US island, Attu Island, and the rest of the chain by 207 mi (333 km). Between the two runs the International Date Line. The relief is somewhat diverse, encompassing folded-block mountains, volcanic plateaus, terraced plains and low mountains. The geologic origins are long-extinct volcanoes on the edge of the Pacific and North American Plates.

The highest point is Steller's Peak on Bering Island at 755 m (2,477 ft). The highest point on Medny Island is Stenjeger's Peak at 647 m (2,123 ft).

The archipelago lies at similar latitudes to Glasgow and Edinburgh in Scotland, Southern Scandinavia and southern parts of the Alaskan Panhandle.

== Climate ==
The climate is relatively mild for its latitude, and maritime, with 220–240 days of precipitation per year. The cool summers are notoriously foggy. The Köppen climate classification would be classed as Dfc bordering on Cfc and Dfb.

== Population ==
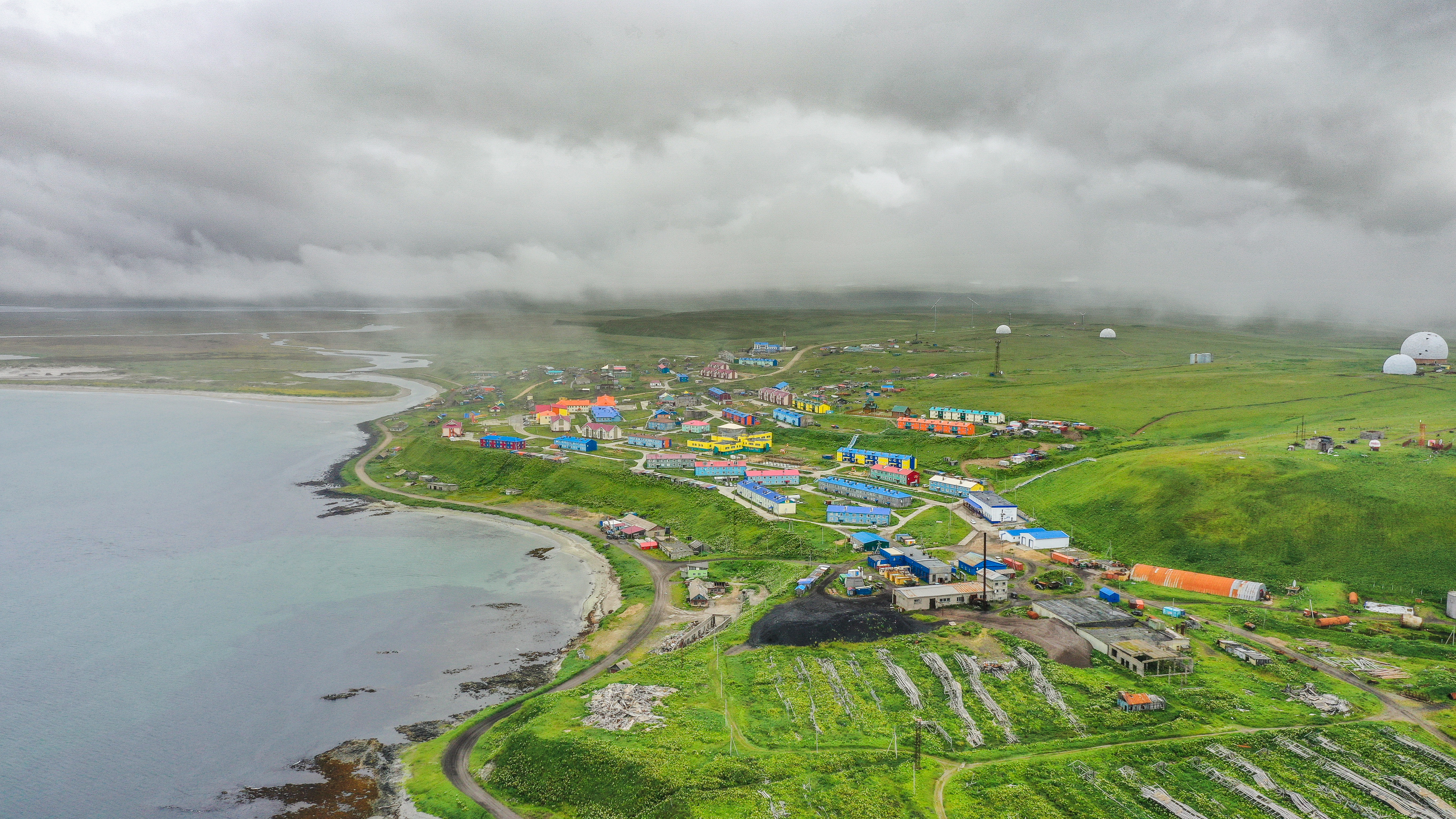
The village of Nikolskoye on Bering Island

The only permanently inhabited locality is the village of Nikolskoye on the northwest end of Bering Island, with an estimated population of 613 as of 2009. This consists almost entirely of Russians and Aleuts. The majority of the island chain's area, as well as much of the adjacent marine habitat, 36,488 km^{2} (14,088 sq mi), is taken up by the Komandorsky Zapovednik, a natural preserve. The economy is based primarily on fishing, mushroom gathering, the administration of the zapovednik (i.e. strictly protected wilderness), ecotourism and government services.

The village has a school, a satellite tracking station and a dirt airstrip to its south.

The other settlements on the two islands are small villages or scattering of houses:

- Severnoye
- Podutesnaya
- Gladkovskaya
- Lisennova
- Peschanka
- Preobrazhenskoye
- Glinka

== Natural history ==
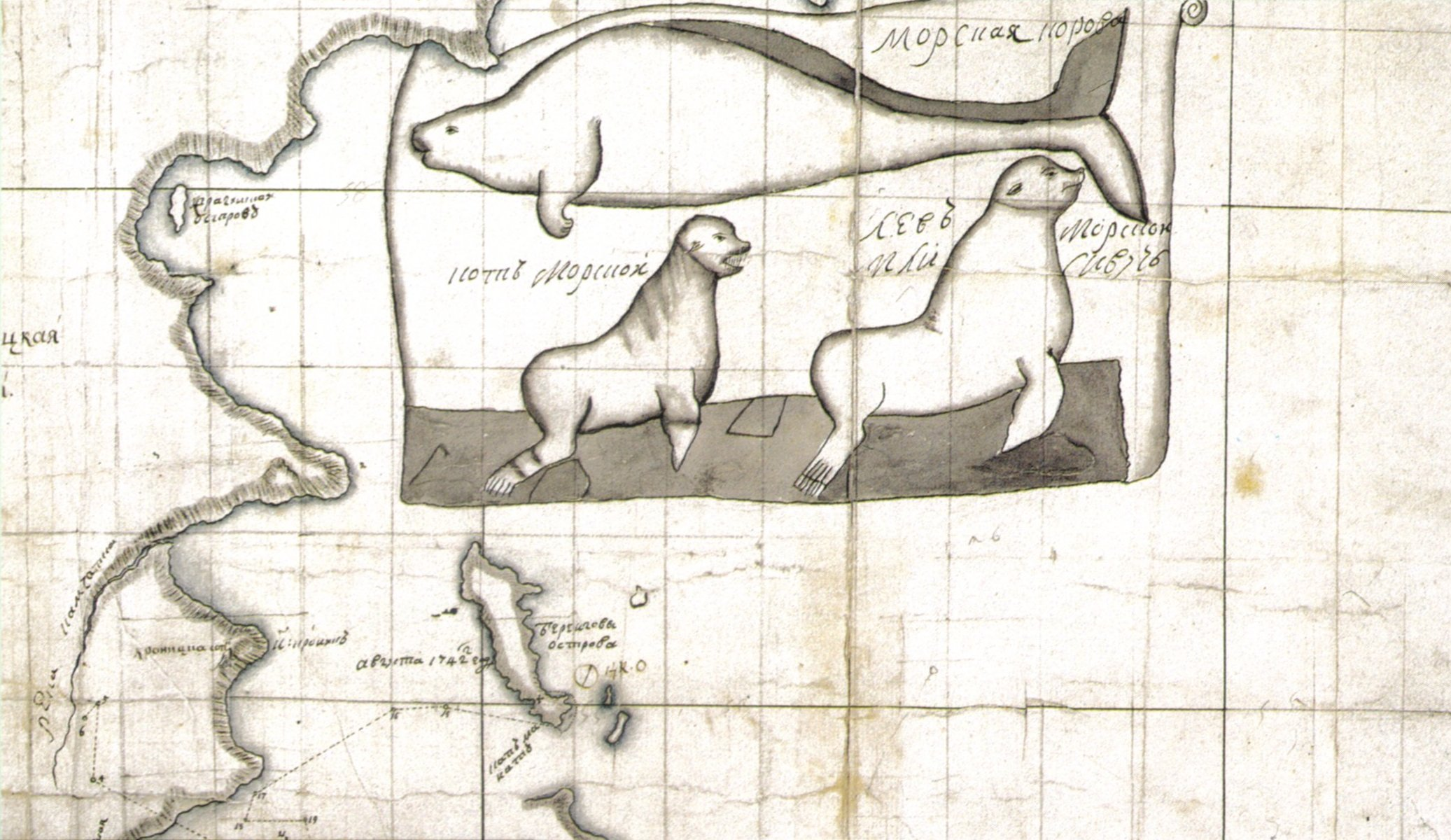
Detail from an early map by Bering expedition member S. Khitrov of eastern Kamchatka, including the Commander Islands, with drawings of Steller's sea cow, the northern fur seal and the Steller sea lion.

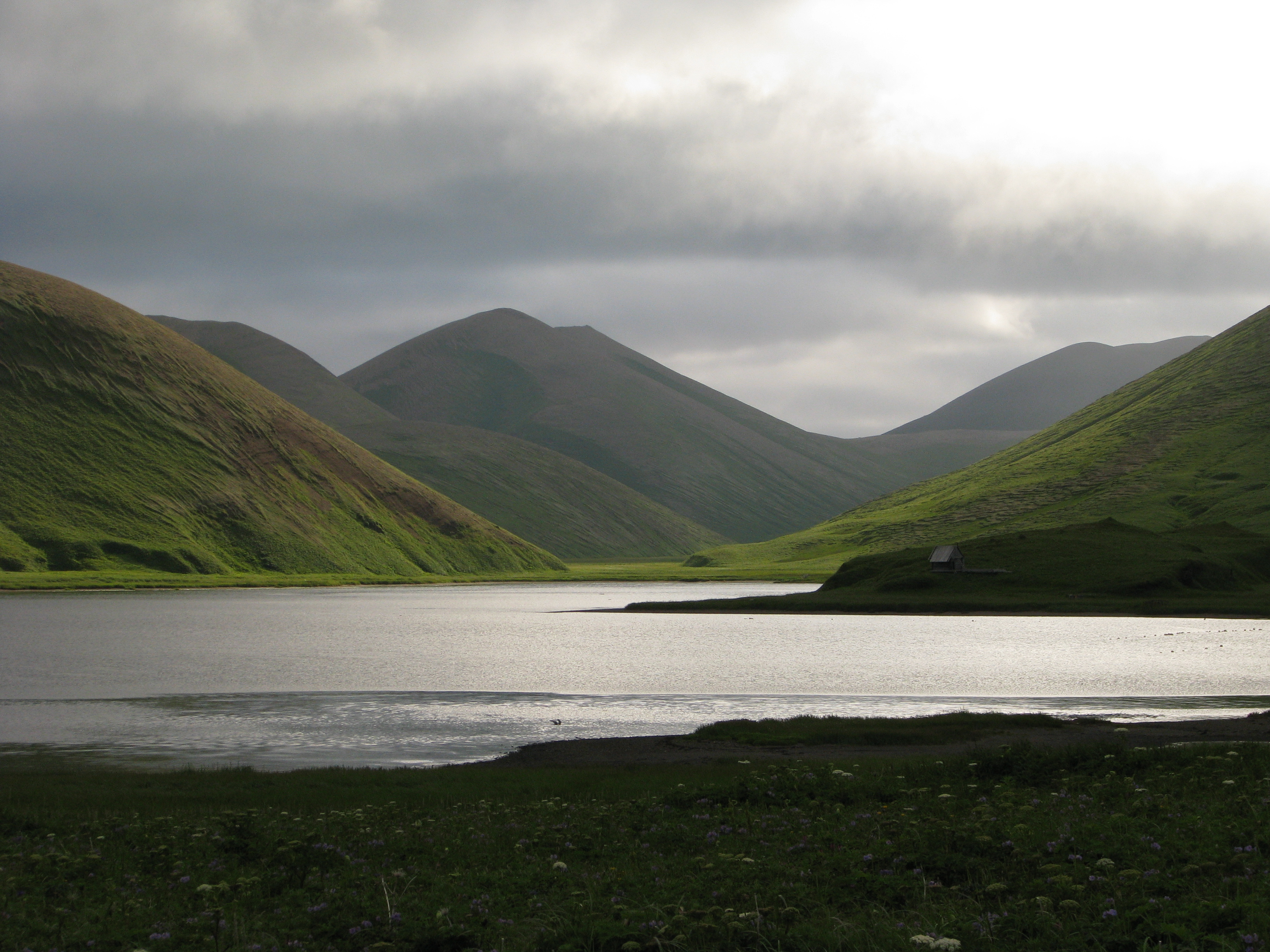
Medny Island

There is no true forest on the Commander Islands. The vegetation is dominated by lichens, mosses and different associations of marshy plants with low grass and dwarf trees. Very tall umbellifers are also common.

=== Mammals ===
Due to the high productivity of the Bering Sea shelf and the Pacific slope and their remoteness from human influence, the Commander Islands are marked by a great abundance of marine animal life and a relative paucity of terrestrial organisms. Notably, significant numbers of northern fur seals (some 200,000 individuals) and Steller sea lions (approximately 5,000 individuals) summer there, both on reproductive rookeries and non-reproductive haul-outs. Sea otters, common seals and larga seals are likewise abundant. Indeed, the sea otter population is stable and possibly increasing, even as their population is falling precipitously in the rest of the Aleutian islands.

The neighboring waters provide important feeding, wintering and migrating habitat for many whale species, many of which are threatened or endangered. Among these are: sperm whales, orcas, several species of Minke whales, beaked whales, and porpoises, humpbacks and endangered species such as the North Pacific right whales and fin whales.

Bering Island was the only known habitat of Steller's sea cows, an immense (over 4,000 kg or 8,800 lb) sirenian related to the dugong. The sea cow was hunted to extinction within 27 years of its discovery in 1741.

The much less diverse terrestrial fauna includes two distinct, endemic subspecies of Arctic fox, (Alopex lagopus semenovi and A. l. beringensis). Though relatively healthy now, these populations had been significantly depleted in the past due to the fur trade. Most other terrestrial species, including wild reindeer, American mink and rats, have all been introduced to the islands by man.

=== Birds ===
Over a million seabirds gather to nest on numerous large colonies along almost all the coastal cliffs. The most common are northern fulmar; common, brunnich's and pigeon guillemots; horned and tufted puffins; cormorants; gulls; and kittiwakes including the extremely local red-legged kittiwake which nests in only a few other colonies in the world. Waterfowl and sandpipers are also abundant along the pre-lake depressions and river valleys of Bering Island, though largely absent from Medny Island. Migratory birds of note with critical nesting or feeding habitat on the islands include such species as Steller's eider, Pacific golden plover and Aleutian tern. Raptors of note include the rare Steller's sea eagle and gyrfalcon. Other bird types include auks such as the Ancient murrelet and game birds such as the Rock ptarmigan. In total, over 180 bird species have been registered on the Commander Islands. The spectacled cormorant, a large essentially flightless bird in the cormorant family, was driven to extinction by around 1850. The islands have been recognised as an Important Bird Area (IBA) by BirdLife International because they support populations of various threatened bird species, including many waterbirds and seabirds.

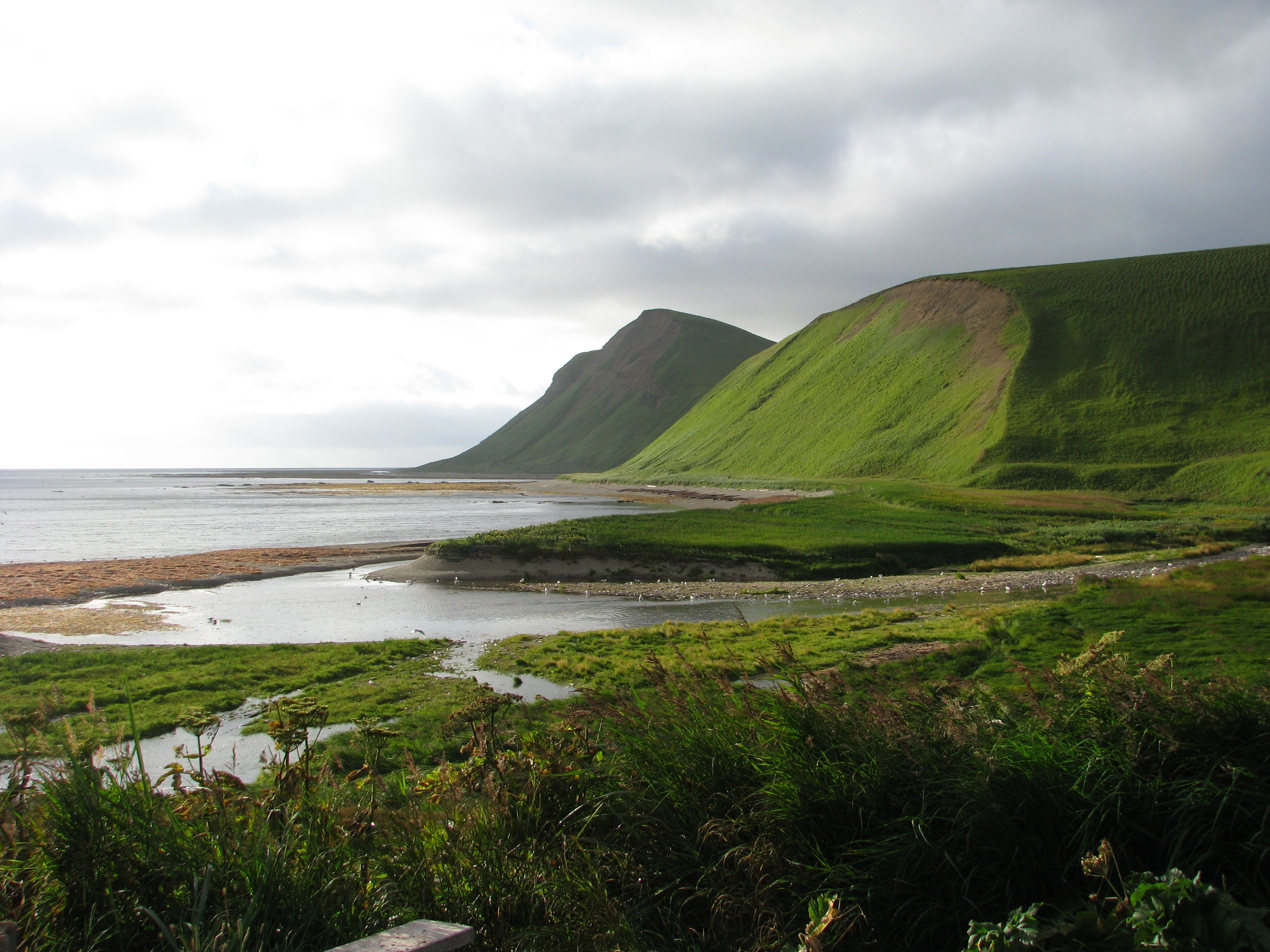
Bering Island

The fish fauna in the mountainous, fast running streams is composed primarily of migratory salmonids, including Arctic char, Dolly Varden, black spotted trout, chinook, sockeye, coho and pink salmon.

There are no amphibians or reptiles on the Commander Islands.

=== Lichens ===
Modern lichen surveys have identified the Commander Islands as a regional centre of diversity for Teloschistales, an order of lichen-forming fungi. A 2019–2022 inventory using temporary sample plots and DNA sequencing collected nearly 600 Teloschistales specimens from 154 plots and recorded 36 species, a higher total than reported from other well-studied local biomes around the North Pacific. Species richness was uneven across habitats, with coastal sites supporting the greatest number of species and the highest plot-level richness, whereas tundra plots were typically poorer and dominated by arctic-alpine elements. The assemblage includes widely distributed boreal and circumpolar taxa alongside species otherwise associated with the western coast of North America or maritime north-east Asia; this mixture has been interpreted as evidence that the Aleutian Arc can act as a dispersal corridor for some lichens between the two landmasses, and a small number of taxa may be local endemics. The authors also caution that this concentration of Teloschistales is not mirrored across all lichen groups on the islands, whose overall lichen richness appears relatively low, possibly reflecting the lack of forest vegetation and severe climatic conditions.

== History ==
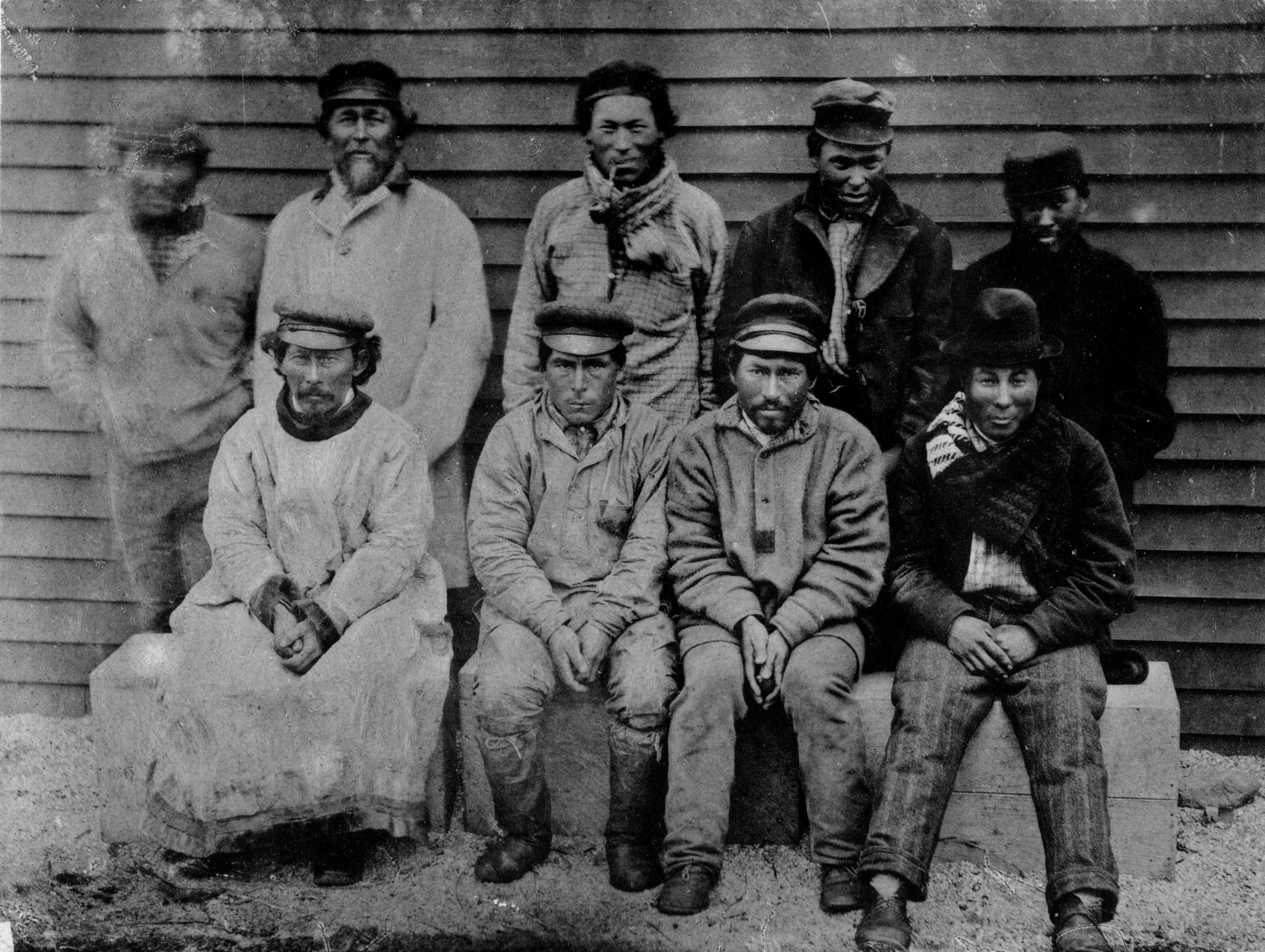
Group of Aleut hunters from Bering Island (c. 1884–1886)

The Commander Islands received their name from Commander Vitus Bering, whose ship St Peter wrecked on the otherwise uninhabited Bering Island on his return voyage from Alaska in 1741. Bering died on the island along with much of the crew. His grave is marked by a modest monument. About half of the crew did manage to survive the winter, thanks in part to the abundance of wildlife (notably the newly discovered Steller's sea cow) and the efforts of naturalist and physician Georg Wilhelm Steller, who cured many of the men of scurvy by compelling them to eat seaweed. Eventually, a smaller boat was built from the remains of the St. Peter and the survivors found their way back to Kamchatka, heavily laden with valuable sea otter pelts. The discovery of the sea otters sparked the great rush of fur-seeking "promyshlenniki" which drove the Russian expansion into Alaska.

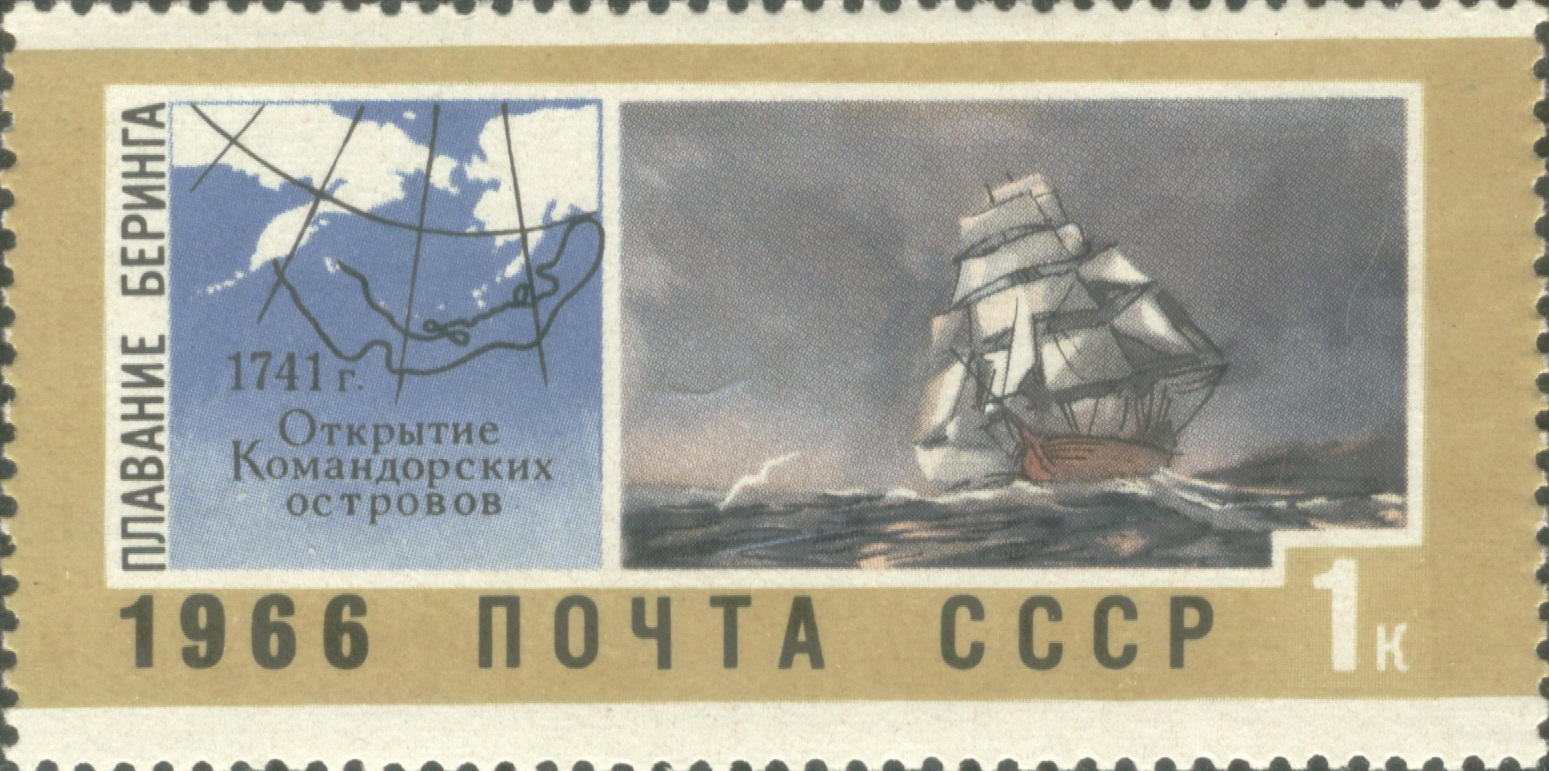
1966 Soviet postage stamp depicting Bering's second voyage and the discovery of the Commander Islands

Aleut (Unangan) people were transferred to the Commander Islands early in 1825 by the Russian-American Company from the Aleutians for the seal trade. Most of the Aleuts inhabiting Bering Island came from Atka Island and those who lived on Medny Island came from Attu Island, now both American possessions. A mixed language called Mednyj Aleut, with Aleut roots but Russian verb inflection, developed among the inhabitants. Today the population of the islands is about two-thirds Russian and one-third Aleut.

The 1943 Battle of the Komandorski Islands took place in the open sea about 160 km (100 mi) south of the islands.

== See also ==
- Aleuts in Russia
- Preobrazhenskoye, Kamchatka Oblast, a now-abandoned village on Medny Island.
