= Medny Island =

Island in the Bering Sea, part of Commander Islands

Coordinates: 54°42′23.52″N 167°43′2.23″E

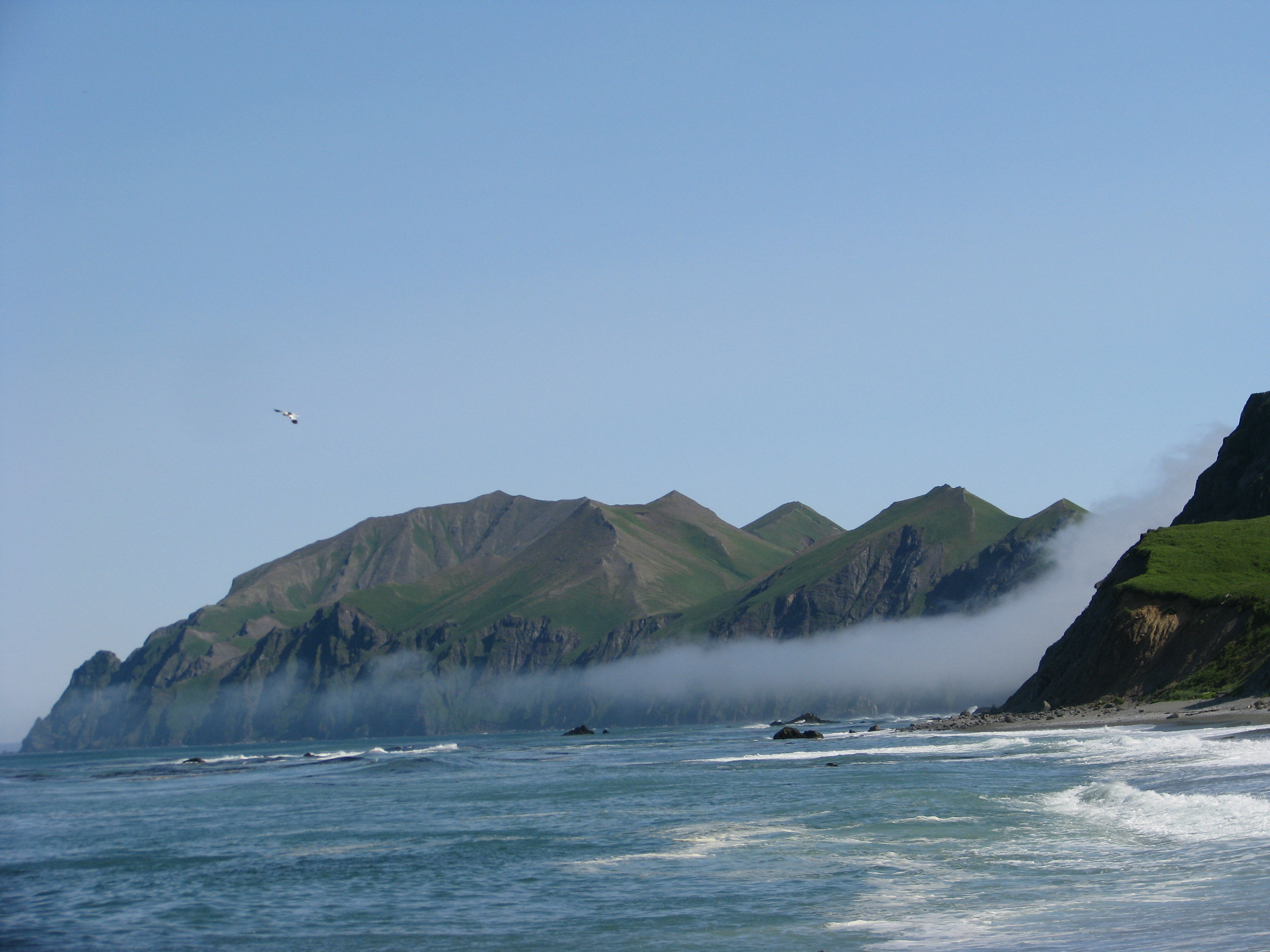
Medny Island

Medny Island (Russian: о́стров Ме́дный), also spelled Mednyy or Mednyi, sometimes called Copper Island in English (literally translated from Russian), is the smaller (after Bering Island) of the two main islands in the Commander Islands in the North Pacific Ocean, east of Kamchatka, Russia. (The other fifteen are better described as islets and rocks.) These islands belong to the Kamchatka Krai of the Russian Federation.

The island was uninhabited until the late 19th century, when Aleuts came from Attu Island in the Aleutian Islands to Medny Island.

The island is 56 km (35 mi) long and between 5 and 7 km (3.1 and 4.3 mi) wide and its area is 186 km^{2} (72 sq mi). Its maximum elevation is 640 m (2,100 ft) and the average annual temperature is +2.8 °C (37.0 °F). About 100 metres (330 ft) off the northwestern end of the islands are the Beaver Stones (Бобровые камни in Russian), two islets connected by an isthmus, with a combined length of 1 km (0.62 mi). Sea Lion Rock (Russian: Сивучий Камень, Sivuchiy Kamen), is another rock islet just off Medny Island.

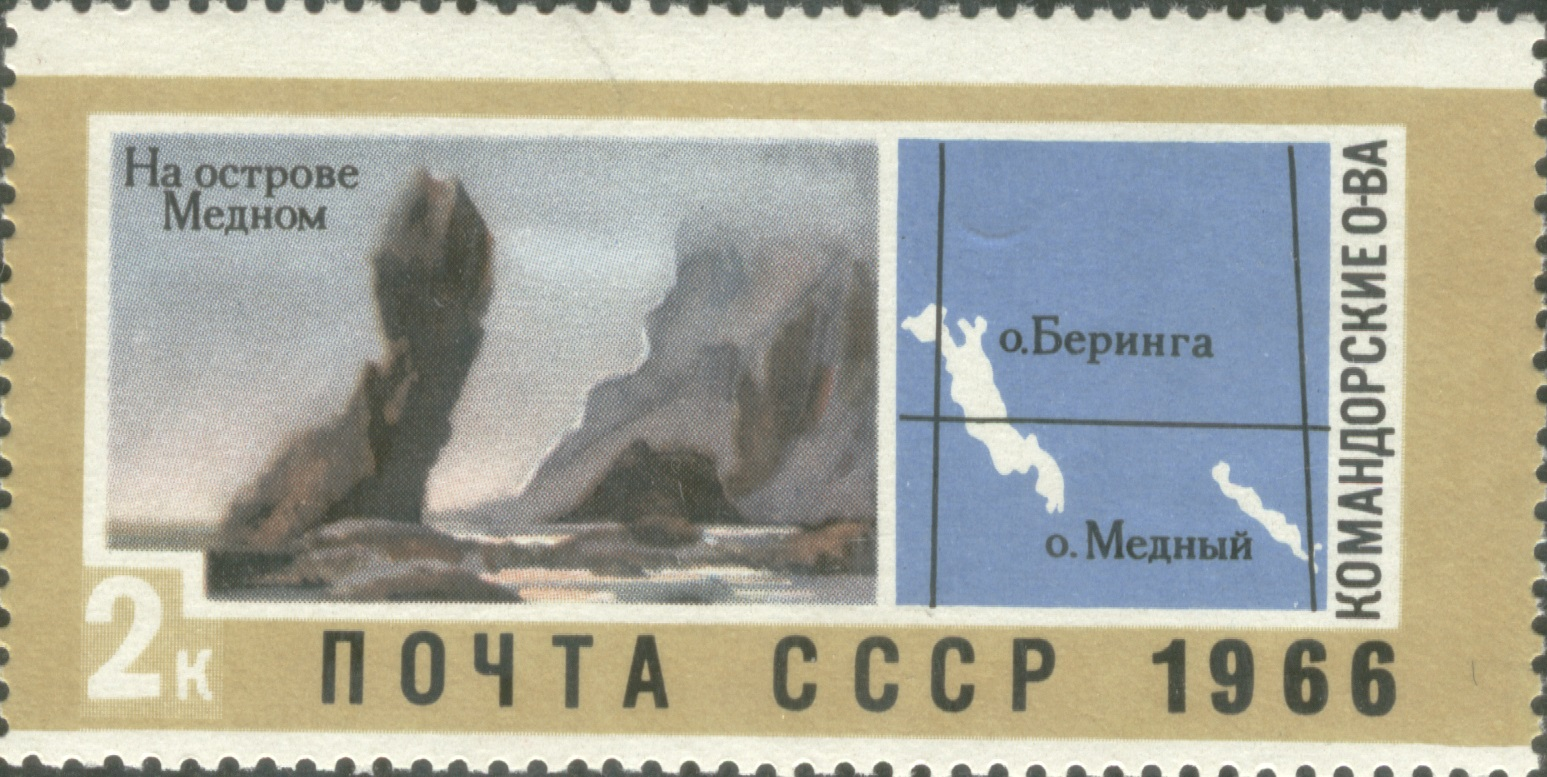
1966 Soviet postage stamp depicting Medny Island.

== History ==
The island was sighted on 5 November 1741 by Bering and his crew while returning from the expedition during which he found America from the west, but he did not land on this island.

The Russian naval officer and historian Vasily Berch believed that Yemelyan Basov reached this island in 1745, during his second of four expeditions to the Commander Islands between 1743 and 1749, and that most of the furs he brought back to Kamchatka in 1745 were hunted on this island.

Towards the end of the 19th century, the settlement of Preobrazhenskoye was established by Aleuts who moved there from Attu Island.

According to linguists, the island's residents spoke a creole language, known as the Mednyj Aleut language, which combined Russian and Aleut vocabulary and grammar.

In 1970, all citizens of the island were moved to neighboring Bering Island. Until 2001, the island was occupied as a frontier post. Since then, the island has been completely uninhabited. Scientific studies of the fauna and flora are conducted annually.

== Ecology ==
Medny Island is home to many Steller sea lions. 340 pups were born on the island in 1999, and 153 in 2016.
