= Bering Island =

Russian island in the Bering Sea

Native name: Behring Island
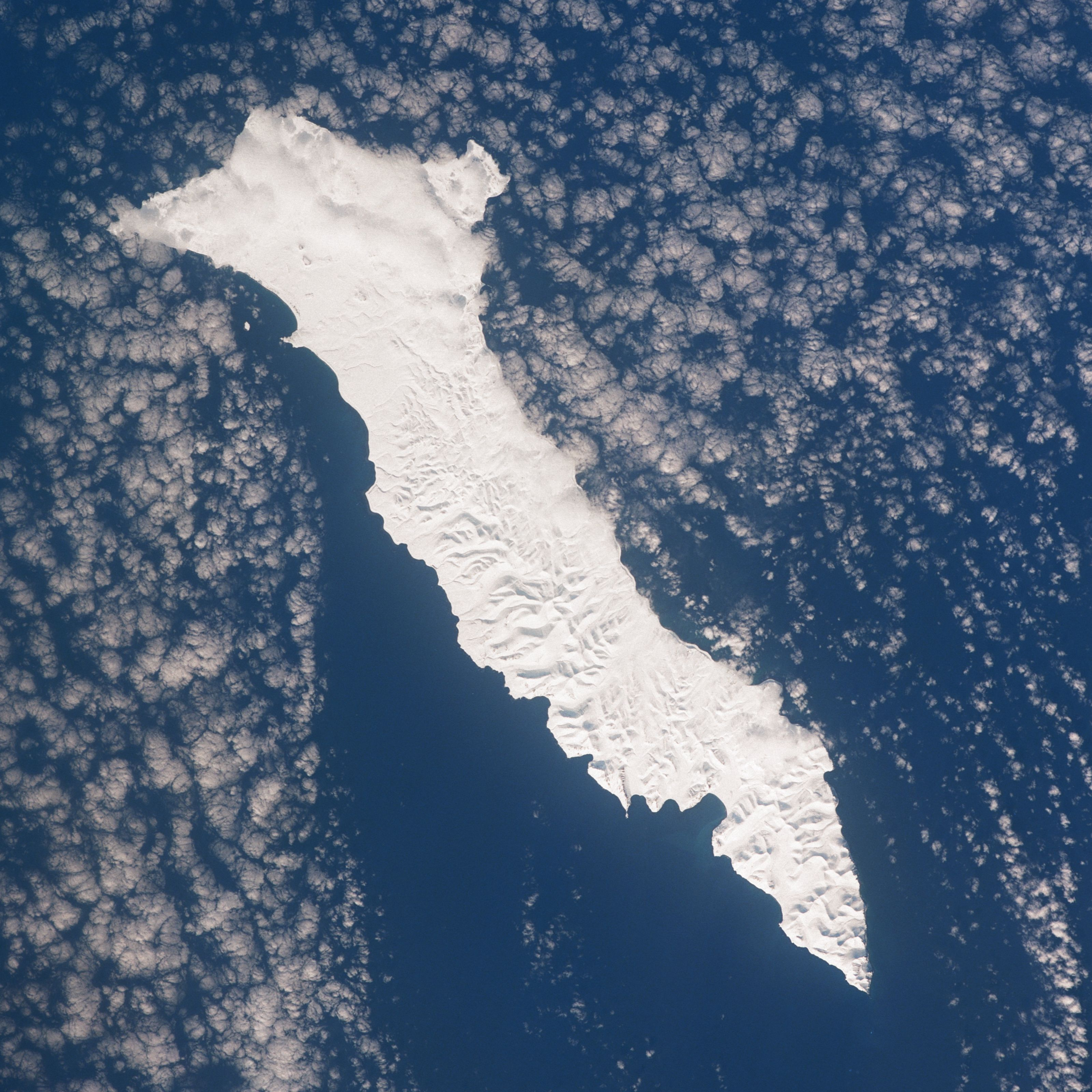
- Bering Island from space, March 1992
- Interactive map of Bering Island

Geography
- Location: Bering Sea
- Coordinates: 55°0′3″N 166°16′23″E

Administration
- Russia
- Oblast: Kamchatskaya
- City: Nikolskoye

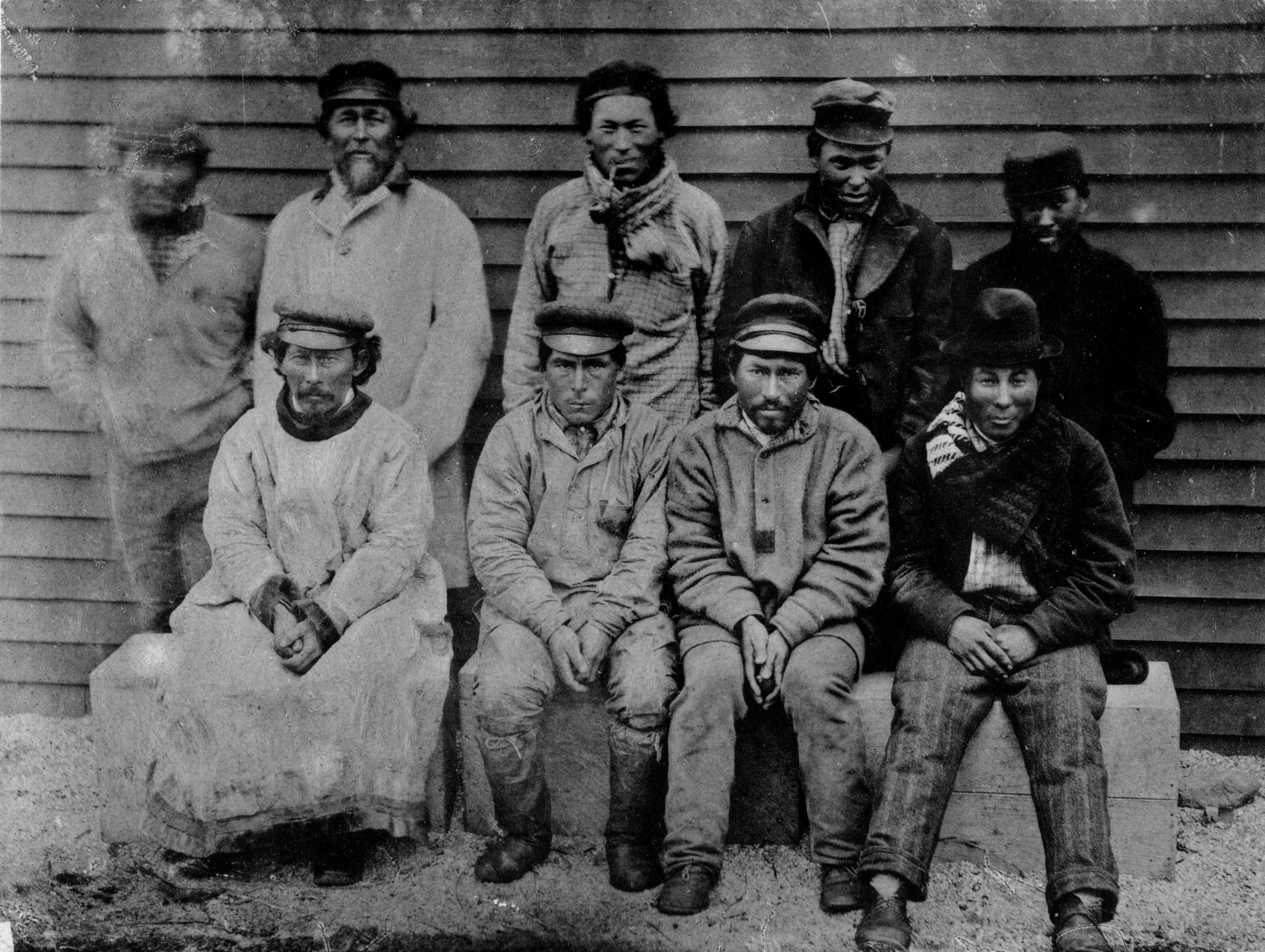
Group of Aleut hunters from Bering Island in the mid 1880s.

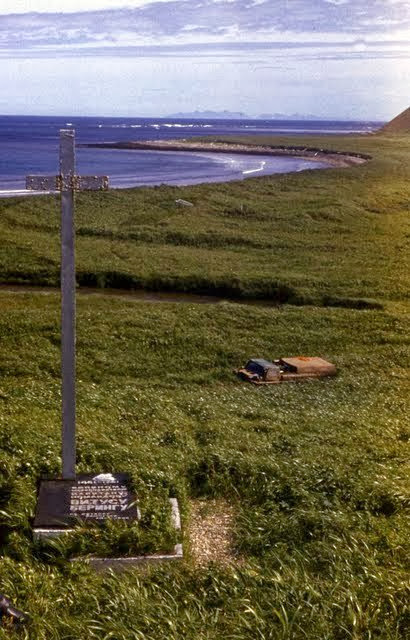
The grave of Vitus Bering

Bering Island (Russian: Остров Беринга, romanized: Ostrov Beringa) is located off the Kamchatka Peninsula in the Bering Sea.

== Description ==
At 95 km (59 mi) long by 15 km (9.3 mi) wide, it is the largest and westernmost of the Commander Islands, with an area of 1,667 km^{2} (644 sq mi). Most of Bering Island and several of the smaller islands in their entirety are now part of the Komandorsky Zapovednik nature preserve.

Bering Island is treeless, desolate and experiences severe weather, including high winds, persistent fog and earthquakes. It had no year-round human residents until roughly 1826. The 2021 Russian census recorded a population of 654 people, with roughly 300 of them identifying as Aleuts. The island's small population is involved mostly in fishing.

Two and a half miles (4 km) off Bering Island's western shore lies small Toporkov Island (Ostrov Toporkov) 55°12′9″N 165°55′59″E. It is a round island with a diameter of 800 m (2,600 ft).

== History ==
In 1741 Commander Vitus Bering, sailing in Svyatoy Pyotr (St. Peter) for the Russian Navy, was shipwrecked and died of scurvy on Bering Island, along with 28 of his men. His ship had been destroyed by storms as they returned from an expedition that discovered mainland Alaska as well as the Aleutian Islands for Russians. The survivors under the command of the Swedish born lieutenant Sven Waxell were stranded on the island for 10 months, and managed to survive by killing seals and birds. They were able to build a boat out of their stranded wreck and managed to return to Petropavlovsk on the Kamchatka Peninsula in 1742 with sea otter furs and preserved meat from the newly discovered island.

Another of the expedition's survivors was Georg Wilhelm Steller, who eventually managed to convince his companions to eat seaweed (thus curing their scurvy). Steller explored Bering Island and cataloged its fauna, including Steller's sea cow, which became extinct within three decades due to being hunted for its meat. The island's highest point (2,464 feet (751 m)) is now named to honor the German-born naturalist. Upon returning to the Russian mainland, Steller then explored the Kamchatka peninsula and ultimately published De Bestiis Marinis (‘On the Beasts of the Sea’). However, his sympathies for the native peoples led to accusations that he was fomenting rebellion, so he was imprisoned and recalled to St. Petersburg, dying en route at age 37, although his diaries were later published to great acclaim and historic significance.

In 1743 Emilian Basov landed on Bering Island to hunt sea otter, beginning the island's documented human habitation as well as ecological destruction. Promyshlenniki began to island-hop across the Bering Sea to the Aleutian islands and ultimately Alaska. In 1825 the Russian-American Company transferred Aleut families from Attu Island to Bering Island to hunt, and another group of Aleut and mixed-race settlers followed the following year, thus establishing the first known permanent human habitation on Bering Island. After Russia sold Alaska and the Aleutian islands to the United States in 1867, Bering Island was placed under the Petropavlovsk-Kamchatsky jurisdiction. The population grew from 110 people in 1827 (17 Russians, 45 Aleuts and 48 mixed race) to more than 300 people in 1879 (100 Aleuts on Copper island alone, along with 332 mixed-race and about 10% Russian or other nationalities). In 1990, after 170 years of separation and loss of cultural traditions, a planeload of Aleuts from Nikolskoye met another planeload of Alaskan Aleuts in Kamchatka's capital, and were surprised they could still communicate in the old Aleut language. Because of their isolation, like the now-Alaskan Pribilof Islands, the Aleuts have been used for studies of genetic drift.

== Nature ==
The area surrounding Bering Island is now a biosphere reserve, known for its diverse wildlife, and particularly marine mammals. The island's shores form a natural habitat for sea otters, and their population now appears stable, unlike those on other Aleutian islands, and although they had been hunted almost to extinction between the discovery of Bering Island and 1854. Steller sea lions continue to summer on Bering Island, but the manatee-like Steller's sea cows, which fed on the kelp beds surrounding the island, were hunted to extinction by 1768.

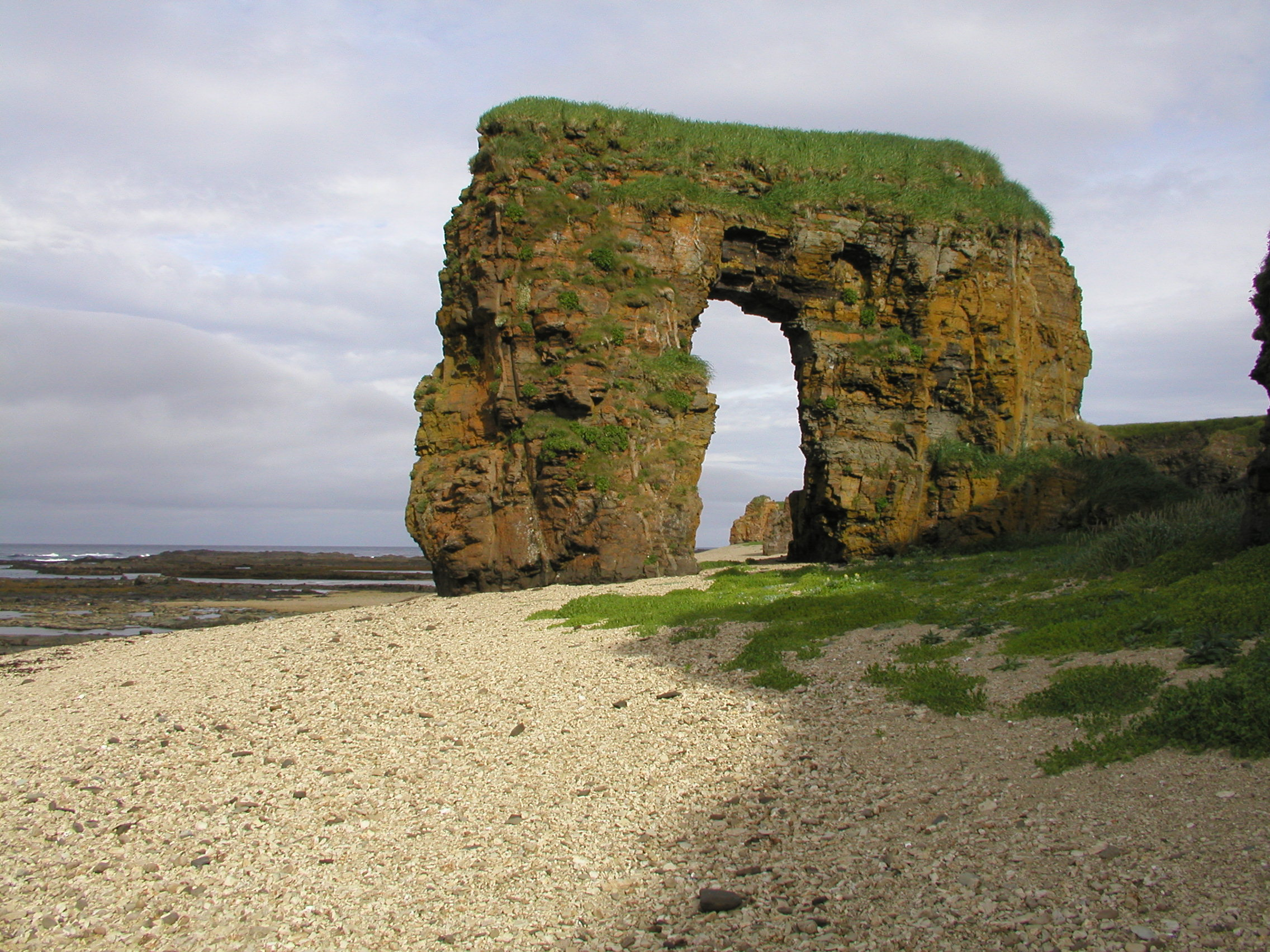
Steller's Arch

Bering Island has also long been famous for its seal rookeries, including northern fur seals, common seals and larga seals, although that population dropped to but 2 rookeries totaling 3,000 seals by 1913 (two years after the North Pacific Fur Seal Convention of 1911), particularly after the 20 year hunting lease of Hutchinson, Kohl and Company of San Francisco, which removed over 800,000 pelts.

Whale species sighted in the surrounding waters include sperm whales, orcas, several species of beaked whales, humpback, and right whales. Porpoises also frequent these waters.

Bering Island also has numerous seabirds. UNESCO noted that 203 bird species have been sighted on the Commander Islands, including 58 nesting there. Puffins are abundant, although the semi-flightless spectacled cormorant became extinct circa 1850. Two species of the Arctic foxes that tormented Bering's crew remain. Humans introduced reindeer, American mink and rats to the islands, with negative effects on native wildlife.

== Climate ==
Like the rest of Kamchatka Krai, Bering Island has a subarctic climate (Dfc), though the ocean makes temperatures much less extreme than interior Siberia, with winters being about four degrees milder than in Petropavlovsk-Kamchatsky. The transition to the subpolar oceanic climate of southwest Alaska to the east is very apparent, especially in the extremely low sunshine hours, which average only around 2.8 h per day due to the consistent fog from the Aleutian Low and the Oyashio Current on its western flank. Extreme temperatures have ranged from −23.5 to 21.9 °C (−10.3–71.4 °F), with the latter occurring as recently as 11 July 2022.

Climate data for Bering Island (1991–2020 normals, extremes 1899–present)
Month	Jan	Feb	Mar	Apr	May	Jun	Jul	Aug	Sep	Oct	Nov	Dec	Year
Record high °C (°F)	6.5 (43.7)	5.1 (41.2)	8.8 (47.8)	10.2 (50.4)	13.6 (56.5)	21.5 (70.7)	21.9 (71.4)	21.0 (69.8)	18.5 (65.3)	13.1 (55.6)	9.2 (48.6)	7.4 (45.3)	21.5 (70.7)
Mean daily maximum °C (°F)	−1.6 (29.1)	−1.7 (28.9)	−0.5 (31.1)	1.3 (34.3)	4.6 (40.3)	7.8 (46.0)	11.0 (51.8)	12.9 (55.2)	11.5 (52.7)	7.2 (45.0)	2.6 (36.7)	−0.6 (30.9)	4.5 (40.2)
Daily mean °C (°F)	−3.1 (26.4)	−3.2 (26.2)	−2.0 (28.4)	−0.1 (31.8)	2.8 (37.0)	5.9 (42.6)	9.3 (48.7)	11.3 (52.3)	9.9 (49.8)	5.7 (42.3)	1.1 (34.0)	−2.1 (28.2)	3.0 (37.3)
Mean daily minimum °C (°F)	−5.2 (22.6)	−5.2 (22.6)	−4.0 (24.8)	−1.6 (29.1)	1.4 (34.5)	4.5 (40.1)	8.1 (46.6)	10.0 (50.0)	8.2 (46.8)	3.8 (38.8)	−0.8 (30.6)	−4.0 (24.8)	1.3 (34.3)
Record low °C (°F)	−21.0 (−5.8)	−23.5 (−10.3)	−21.9 (−7.4)	−13.9 (7.0)	−9.6 (14.7)	−2.3 (27.9)	−0.5 (31.1)	−0.1 (31.8)	−2.9 (26.8)	−8.5 (16.7)	−15.4 (4.3)	−19.9 (−3.8)	−23.5 (−10.3)
Average precipitation mm (inches)	63 (2.5)	53 (2.1)	46 (1.8)	39 (1.5)	38 (1.5)	32 (1.3)	39 (1.5)	63 (2.5)	71 (2.8)	91 (3.6)	82 (3.2)	62 (2.4)	679 (26.7)
Average precipitation days	13.8	12.7	11.4	9.6	7.7	6.2	7.6	10.4	10.8	14.2	15.0	15.1	134.5
Mean monthly sunshine hours	31.0	56.5	99.2	120.0	102.3	84.0	74.4	108.5	123.0	111.6	54.0	27.9	992.4
Source 1: Погода и Климат (Weather and Climate)
Source 2: allmetsat.com (sunshine only)
