= Description of the Land of Kamchatka (Krasheninnikov) =

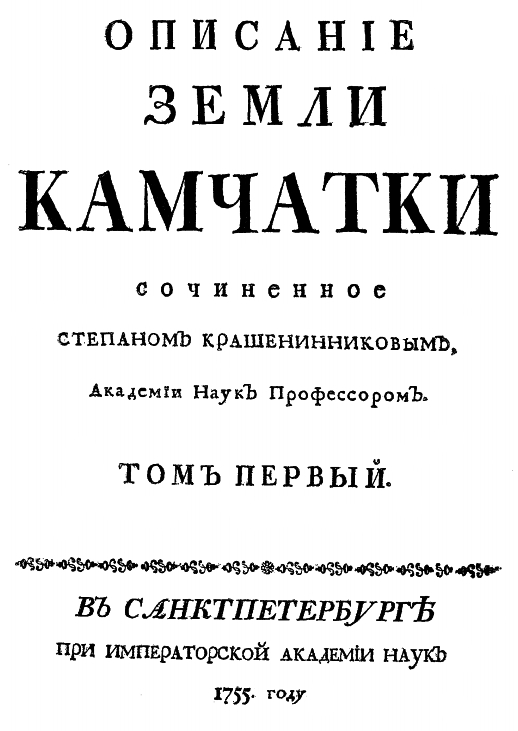
Opisanie zemli Kamchatki (Description of the Land of Kamchatka), 1755

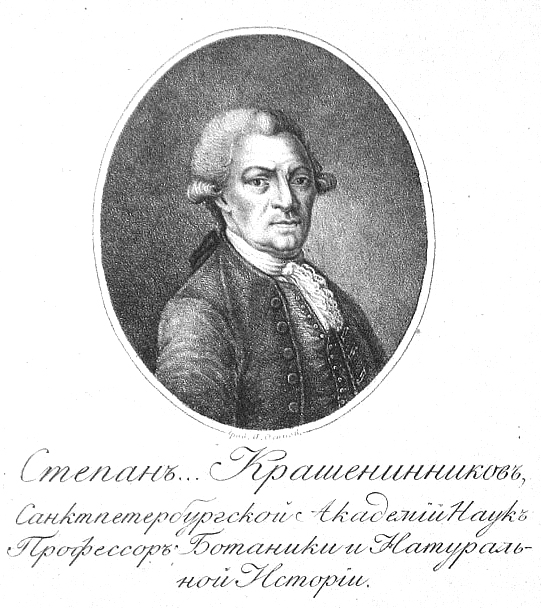
"Stepan Krasheninnikov, Professor of Botany and Natural History at the St. Petersburg Academy of Sciences." (Portrait by A. A. Osipov, 1801)

Opisanie zemli Kamchatki (Russian: Описание земли Камчатки; Description of the Land of Kamchatka) is an early fundamental text on Siberia of the Russian geographer and explorer Stepan Krasheninnikov (1711–1755) who gave in it the first full description of Kamchatka in the early 18th century. The author was elected to the Russian Academy of Sciences in 1745. He was Professor of Botany and Natural History at the St. Petersburg Academy of Sciences.

== Introduction ==
The author Krasheninnikov was the son of a soldier, he was selected for scientific training to participate in the Second Kamchatka Expedition due to his outstanding academic achievements. The expedition set out in August 1733. After four years of extremely arduous travel, the members of the “academic delegation” refused to continue the journey, citing health problems, and reported back to St. Petersburg that the student Krasheninnikov could carry out the exploration of Kamchatka on his own, what he did. Over ten years (1733–1743), he traveled 25,773 versts (more than half the circumference of the earth) through Siberia and Kamchatka, undertaking numerous research trips to Lake Baikal, along the Lena River, and into Yakutia — but most importantly, he explored, studied, and described the land of Kamchatka in its full breadth and depth: its borders, terrain, climate, flora and fauna, volcanoes and geysers, and its native population. He collected extensive scientific specimens, conducted meteorological observations, recorded tides, and compiled a small dictionary of the Koryak language.

His work contains detailed accounts of the zoology, geography and botany of this Siberian region as well as on the language and culture of the Itelmen and Koryak peoples. The English translation of James Grieve was published under the title The history of Kamtschatka and the Kurilski Islands with the countries adjacent. A new edition of the work is contained in the Russian book series Great Russian travelers (Великие русские путешественники). The Krasheninnikov Volcano on Kamchatka is named in his honour.

„Description of the Land of Kamchatka“ was published only after the author’s death (1755). This two-volume work was translated into English (1764), German (1766), French (1767), and Dutch (1770). For a longer time, this publication was not only an encyclopedia of the region but also the only work about Kamchatka in European literature.

The printing of the first edition, based on various earlier manuscript versions, was completed in February 1755 (the second edition appeared in 1786; the third in the Complete Collection of Scientific Travels through Russia (Полное собрание ученых путешествий по России), published on the initiative of Sergei Uvarov, President of the Imperial Academy of Sciences in Saint Petersburg; Vol. I–II, 1818–1819).

This work marked the beginning of a new genre of scientific travel literature in Russia. It contains material and wording in literary language based on spoken Russian. It gained popularity among a wide readership. Alongside the works of M. V. Lomonosov, A. P. Sumarokov, and G. R. Derzhavin, it also served as a source for the compilation of the Dictionary of the Russian Academy (Словарь Академии Российской).

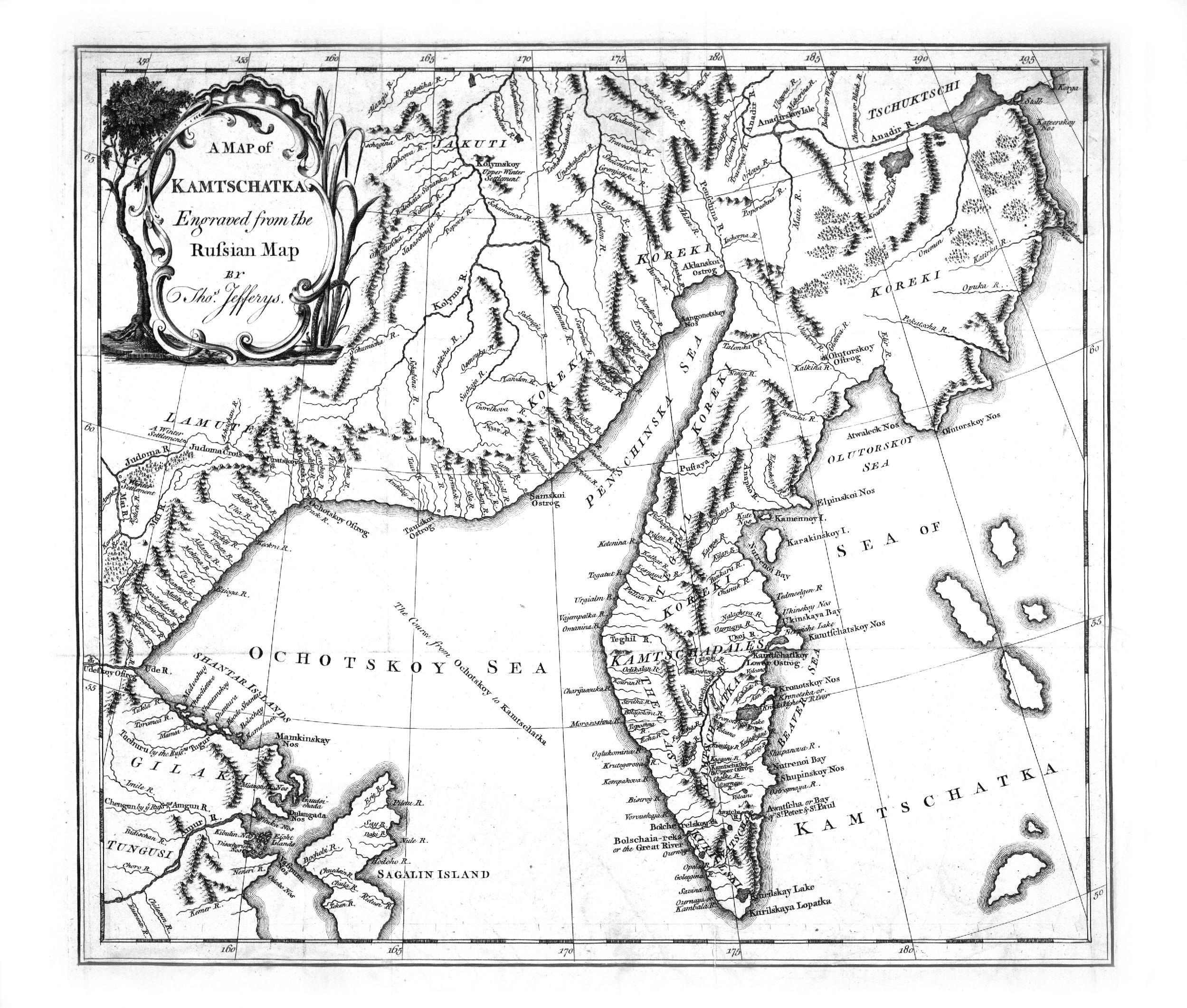
Thomas Jefferys engraved this Russian map depicting discoveries made during the Second Kamchatka Expedition conveyed in Stepan Krasheninnikov's book.

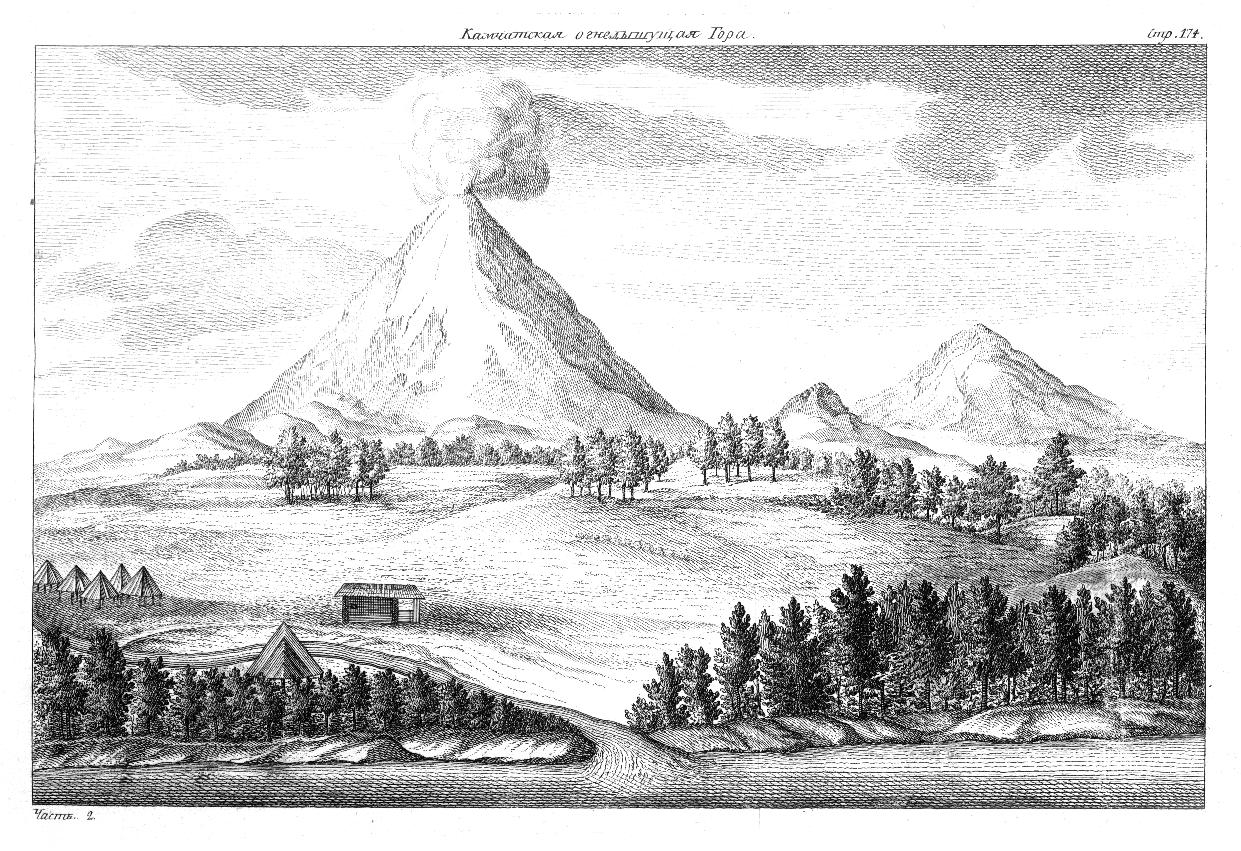
"The Fire-Breathing Mountain of Kamchatka." Illustration from the book by S. Krasheninnikov: Description of the Land of Kamchatka, St Petersburg 1755.

== About the author and his work ==
From the preface to the 1st edition of Description of the Land of Kamchatka (1755):

Он был из числа тех, кои ни знатною природою ни фортуны благодеянием не предпочтены, но сами собою, своими качествами и службою, произошли в люди, кои ничего не заимствуют от своих предков и сами достойны называться начальниками своего благополучия.

He was from among those who were not favored by noble nature or fortune, but by themselves, by their own qualities and service, came to be men who borrow nothing from their ancestors and are themselves worthy to be called the rulers of their well-being.

A. M. Karamyshev (ru):

Ingenio et scientia ornatus indefessa opera legit Sibiricas gazas, multumque utilitatis, dignus Patriae civis in posterum praestitisset, si fata tam cito eum non abstulissent… — Endowed with intellect and knowledge, he gathered the treasures of Siberia with the greatest difficulty; a worthy citizen of his homeland, he would have brought much benefit to posterity, had fate not taken him so early.

V. I. Vernadsky:

Like Gmelin and Steller, Krasheninnikov was not a genius scientist, but he was an accurate observer whose works have withstood the passage of time. The names of Gmelin, Steller, and Krasheninnikov — scientists of the first half of the 18th century — have retained their significance for us; at the same time, their works are historical documents, as they scientifically and precisely described the nature of Russia under conditions that have already vanished and will never return.

With the emergence of Krasheninnikov and Lomonosov, the preparatory period in the history of scientific creativity of the Russian people came to an end. Russia finally entered the ranks of the educated world as an equal cultural force, and a new era of its cultural life began.

== Editions ==
Russian:

- Описание земли Камчатки, Sankt Petersburg 1755, Vol. 1 and Vol 2 – Online from Niedersächsische Staats- und Universitätsbibliothek Göttingen
- Полное собрание ученых путешествий по России, издаваемое Императорскою Академией Наук, по предложению ее президента [Complete Collection of Scientific Voyages in Russia, published by the Imperial Academy of Sciences, at the suggestion of its President]. I (1818), II (1819)
- С. П. Крашенинников: Описание земли Камчатки. С приложением рапортов, донесений и других неопубликованных материалов. Академия наук СССР. Институт географии. Географическое общество Союза ССР. Институт этнографии. Издательство Главсевморпути, М.,-Л. 1949 Ответственные редакторы академик Л. С. Берг, Академик А. А. Григорьев и проф. И. Н. Степанов (Online: I, II)
- С.П. Крашенинников в Сибири: Неопубликованные материалы. — М.—Л.: Наука, 1966. — 241 с.
- Крашенинников С. П. Описание Земли Камчатки: В двух томах: Репринт. воспроизведение. — СПб.: Наука, 1994. Т. 1. ISBN 5-02-028232-4, ISBN 5-8440-0006-4.
- Крашенинников С. П. Описание Земли Камчатки: В двух томах: Репринт. воспроизведение. — СПб.: Наука, 1994. Т. 2. ISBN 5-02-028233-2, ISBN 5-8440-0007-2.
- Крашенинников, С. П. Описание земли Камчатки. М.: Эксмо; Око, 2014 (Великие русские путешественники)

Translations:

- 1764 — The history of Kamtchatka and the Kurilski Islands with the countries adjacent. 1764. - English translation of James Grieve – Online)
- 1767 — Histoire de Kamsсhatka, des isles Kurilski et des contrées voisines: en 2 vol. 1767 - French translation (Online: I, II)
- 1766 — Opisanie Zemli Kamtschatki d. i. Beschreibung des Landes Kamtschatka ... 1755 in einem Auszuge in Englischer Sprache bekant gemacht von Jac. Grieve und mit Landkarten und Kupferbildern 1764 hrsg. von T. Jefferys nun in das Deutsche übersetzet und mit Anmerkungen erläutert von Joh. T. Köhler. Lemgo, Meyer 1766 - German translation
- 1770 — Aardrykskundige en natuurlyke beschryving van Kamtschatka : en de Kurilsche Eilanden met en gedeelte der kust van Amerika : behelzende eene omstandige beschryving dier landen, de natuurlyke histoire, den aart, zenden en genwonten der inwooneren, en de erste ontedekking derzelven, benevens de verovering van Kamtschatka door de Russen : op Ruk-Keizerlijk bevel, te Petersburg, in de Russische taal uitgegeeven, in 2 vol. Amsterdam, 1770 - Dutch translation

== See also ==
- Great Academic Expeditions (in Russian)
- Second Kamchatka Expedition
- First Kamchatka Expedition
- Vitus Bering
- Georg Wilhelm Steller
- Gerhard Friedrich Müller
- Johann Georg Gmelin
