= Krasheninnikov =

Krasheninnikov may refer to:

- Pavel Krasheninnikov, Russian lawyer and politician
- Stepan Krasheninnikov, Russian explorer
- Yuri Krasheninnikov, Russian beach soccer player
- Krasheninnikov (volcano), two stratovolcanoes in Kamtchatka named for Stepan Krasheninnikov
- Krasheninnikov Peak, peak on the south side of the Svarthausane Crags in the Südliche Petermann Range of the Wohlthat Mountains, Antarctica.
