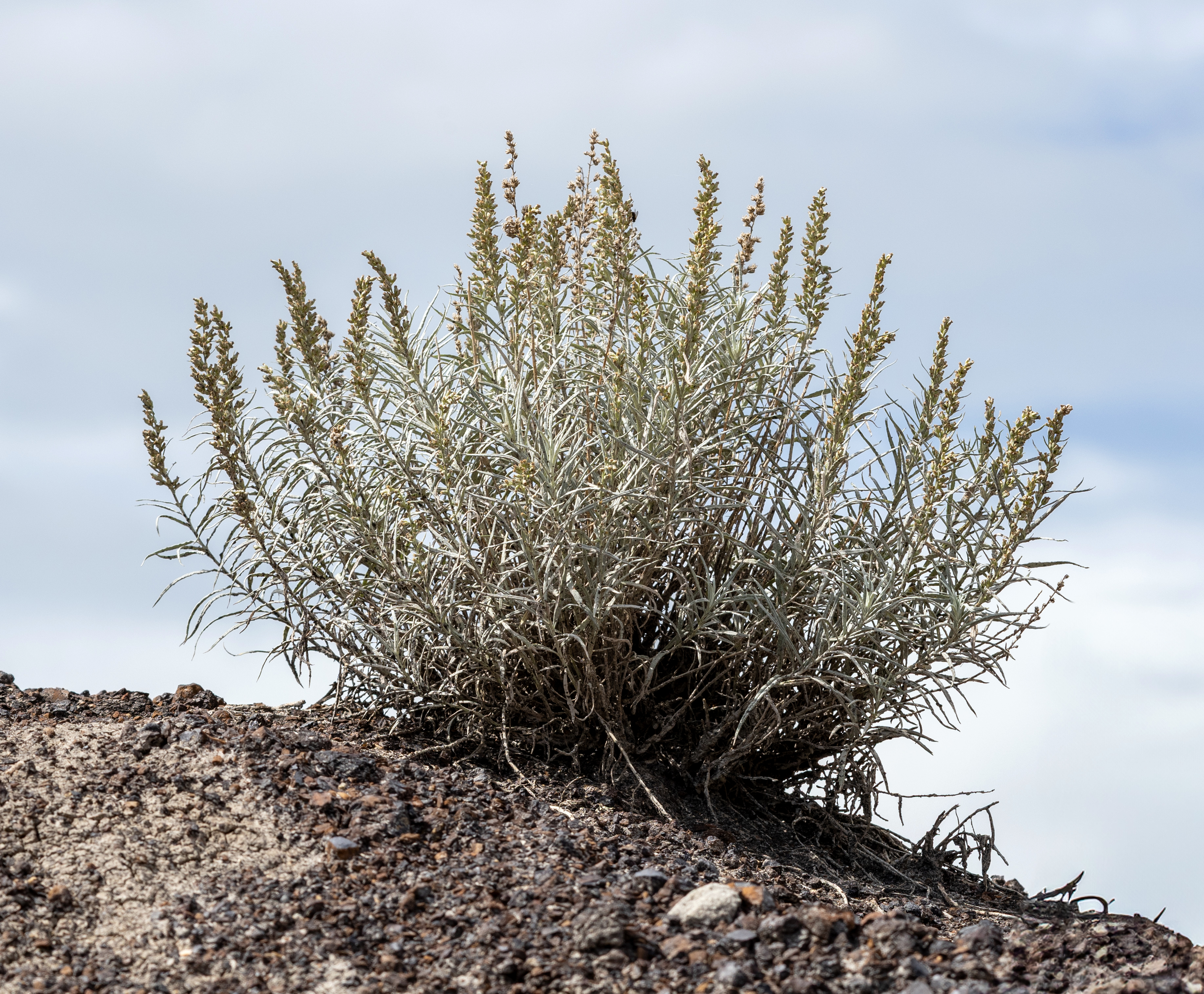

Conservation status
- Secure (NatureServe)

Scientific classification
- Kingdom: Plantae
- Clade: Tracheophytes
- Clade: Angiosperms
- Clade: Eudicots
- Order: Caryophyllales
- Family: Amaranthaceae
- Genus: Krascheninnikovia
- Species: K. lanata

Binomial name
- Krascheninnikovia lanata (Pursh) A.Meeuse & Smit

Synonyms
- Ceratoides lanata (Pursh) J.T. Howell

= Krascheninnikovia lanata =

Species of flowering plant

Krascheninnikovia lanata is a species of flowering plant currently placed in the family Amaranthaceae (previously, Chenopodiaceae), known by the common names winterfat, white sage, and wintersage. It is native to much of western North America: from central Western Canada; through the Western United States; to northern Mexico.

The genus was named for Stepan Krasheninnikov—the early 18th-century Russian botanist and explorer of Siberia and Kamchatka.

== Distribution and habitat ==
Winterfat grows in a great variety of habitats at 100–2,700 metres (330–8,860 ft) in elevation—from grassland plains and xeric scrublands to rain shadow faces of montane locations.

Winterfat is a halophyte that thrives in salty soils such as those on alkali flats, including those of the Great Basin, Central Valley, Great Plains, and Mojave Desert.

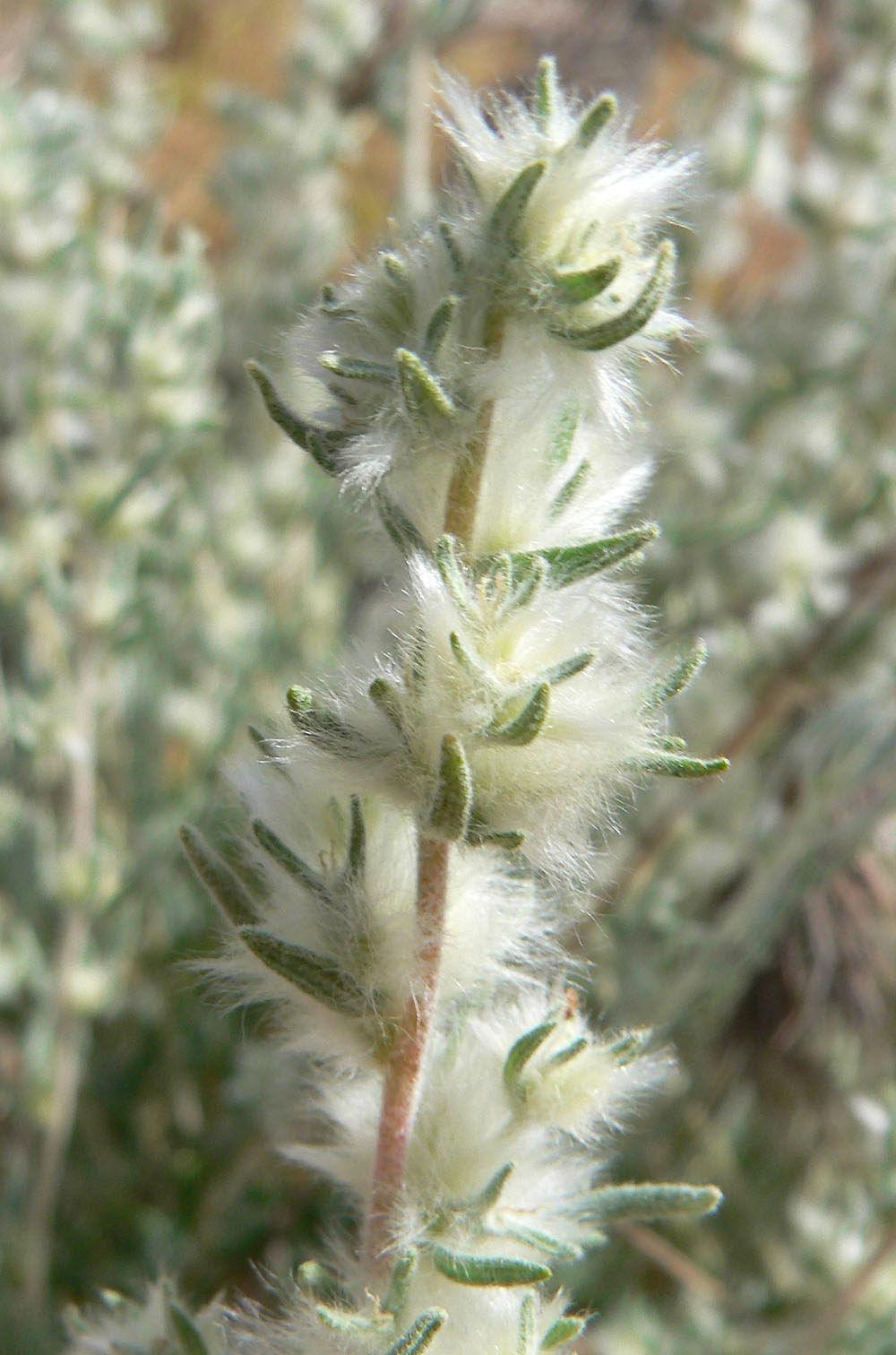
Close-up of plant at Red Rock Canyon, N.E. Mojave Desert, Nevada.

== Description ==
Krascheninnikovia lanata is a small shrub sending erect stem branches to heights between 0.5–1 metre (1.6–3.3 ft). It produces flat lance-shaped leaves up to 3 centimeters long. The stems and gray foliage are covered in woolly white hairs that age to a reddish color. The woolly hairs start development in the late fall and gradually diminish through the winter season.

The tops of the stem branches are occupied by plentiful spike inflorescences from March to June. The shrub is generally monoecious, with each upright inflorescence holding mostly staminate flowers with a few pistillate flowers clustered near the bottom. The staminate flowers have large, woolly leaflike bracts.

The pistillate flowers have smaller bracts and develop tiny white fruits. The silky hairs on the fruits allow for wind dispersal.

== Cultivation ==
Krascheninnikovia lanata is cultivated in the specialty plant nursery trade as an ornamental plant for xeriscape and wildlife gardens, and native plant natural landscapes. The light gray foliage can be a distinctive feature in garden designs. The plants are very long-lived.

== Uses ==
Winterfat is an important winter forage for livestock and wildlife because its evergreen leaves are high in protein, hence its common name.

=== Cultivation ===
Winterfat is sometimes grown in xeriscape or native plant gardens for its striking whitish wool. It is especially valued for the fall and winter interest it provides in gardens. Small plants are easily transplanted.

=== Native American use ===
Winter fat was a traditional medicinal plant used by many Native American tribes that lived within its large North American range. These tribes used traditional plants to treat a wide variety of ailments and for other benefits. The Zuni people use a poultice of ground root bound with a cotton cloth to treat burns.
