= Krasheninnikov Peak =

Mountain in Antarctica

Krasheninnikov Peak (71°41′S 12°40′E) is a peak, 2,525 metres (8,280 ft) high, on the south side of the Svarthausane Crags in the Südliche Petermann Range of the Wohlthat Mountains, Antarctica. It was discovered and plotted from air photos by the Third German Antarctic Expedition, 1938–39, and was mapped from air photos and surveys by the Sixth Norwegian Antarctic Expedition, 1956–60. It was remapped by the Soviet Antarctic Expedition, 1960–61, and named after Russian geographer S.P. Krasheninnikov.
