= Description of the Land of Kamchatka =

Description of the Land of Kamchatka refers to:

- Description of the Land of Kamchatka (Krasheninnikov) of Stepan Krasheninnikov
- Description of the Land of Kamchatka (Steller) of Georg Wilhelm Steller
