= Martin Spanberg =

Danish-born Russian naval lieutenant (died 1761)

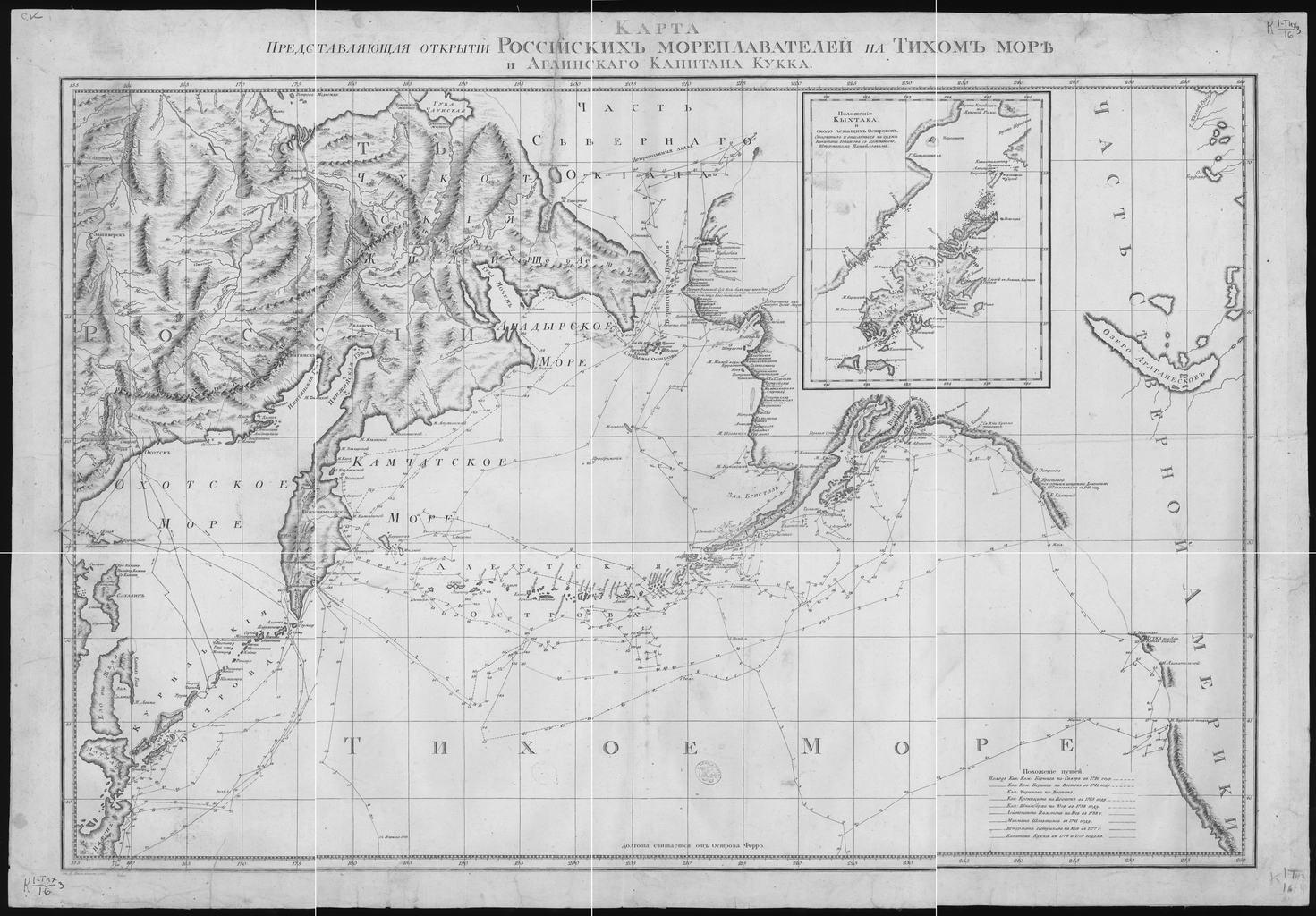
A map of the paths of James Cook and Russian explorers in the North Pacific during the 18th century, including Spanberg's three voyages.

Martin Spanberg (Russian: Мартын Петрович Шпанберг, romanized: Martyn Petrovich Shpanberg; died 1761) was a Danish-born Russian naval officer who took part with his compatriot Vitus Bering in both Kamchatka expeditions as second in command. He is best known for finding a sea route to Japan from Russian territory and for exploring the Kuril Islands. Shikotan, one of the Kurils, was renamed in his honor by the Russians in 1796.

== Career ==
Spanberg led three voyages in 1738, 1739, and 1742. On the first of these voyages, Spanberg left 29 June 1738 aboard the Archangel Michael (Архангел Михаил, Arkhangel Mikhail) with his own assistants William Walton (Вильям or Вилим Вальтон, Vilim Valton) and Alexander Shelting (Алексей Елеазарович Шельтинг, Aleksey Yeleazarovich Shel'ting) commanding the Sv. or St. Gabriel (Святой Гавриил, Sviatoi Gavriil) and the Nadezhda (Надежда) respectively. He charted 30 of the Kurils. On the second voyage, he gained a fourth ship—the Bolsheretsk (Большерецк)—and was the first Russian commander to visit Honshu in Japan, establishing Russo-Japanese diplomatic relations. His ships landed in a scenic area now part of the Rikuchu Kaigan National Park but, despite isolationist Japanese sakoku policy of the time, the sailors were treated with courtesy. The second and third voyages also surveyed the coasts of Japan and Sakhalin as well as the Kurils.

== Works ==
Spanberg wrote a brief account of his travels. They pointedly failed to locate the phantom islands of Rica de Oro and Rica de Plata ("Rich in Gold and Silver") supposedly in the area. Producing the first trustworthy account of the region, Spanberg further established that the supposedly enormous Staten Island (Dutch: Staten Eylandt, lit. "States Island") and Company Land (Dutch: Compagnies Landt; French: Terre de la Compagnie) common on European maps after the 1643 visit of Maarten Gerritsz Vries of the Dutch East India Company were either nonexistent or much smaller in extent, grossly misrepresenting some of the Kurils like Urup and Iturup. This was not, however, immediately accepted, and the various phantom islands continued to appear on French and other maps for decades longer.

== Honors ==
Shpanberg Island in the Kurils and Shpanberg Island in the Nordenskiöld Archipelago are named for him.

== See also ==
- Vitus Bering
- Dembei
- Gerasim Izmailov
- Ivan Fyodorov
- Great Northern Expedition

== Sources ==
- Lensen, George Alexander (2017), "Early Russo-Japanese Relations", Japan and the Pacific, 1540–1920, The Pacific World: Lands, Peoples, and History of the Pacific, 1500–1900, Abingdon: Routledge, ISBN 9781351925549.
- Wroth, Lawrence C. (1944), "The Early Cartography of the Pacific", The Papers of the Bibliographical Society of America, vol. 38, Chicago: University of Chicago Press, pp. 87–231 & 233–268, JSTOR 24301919.
