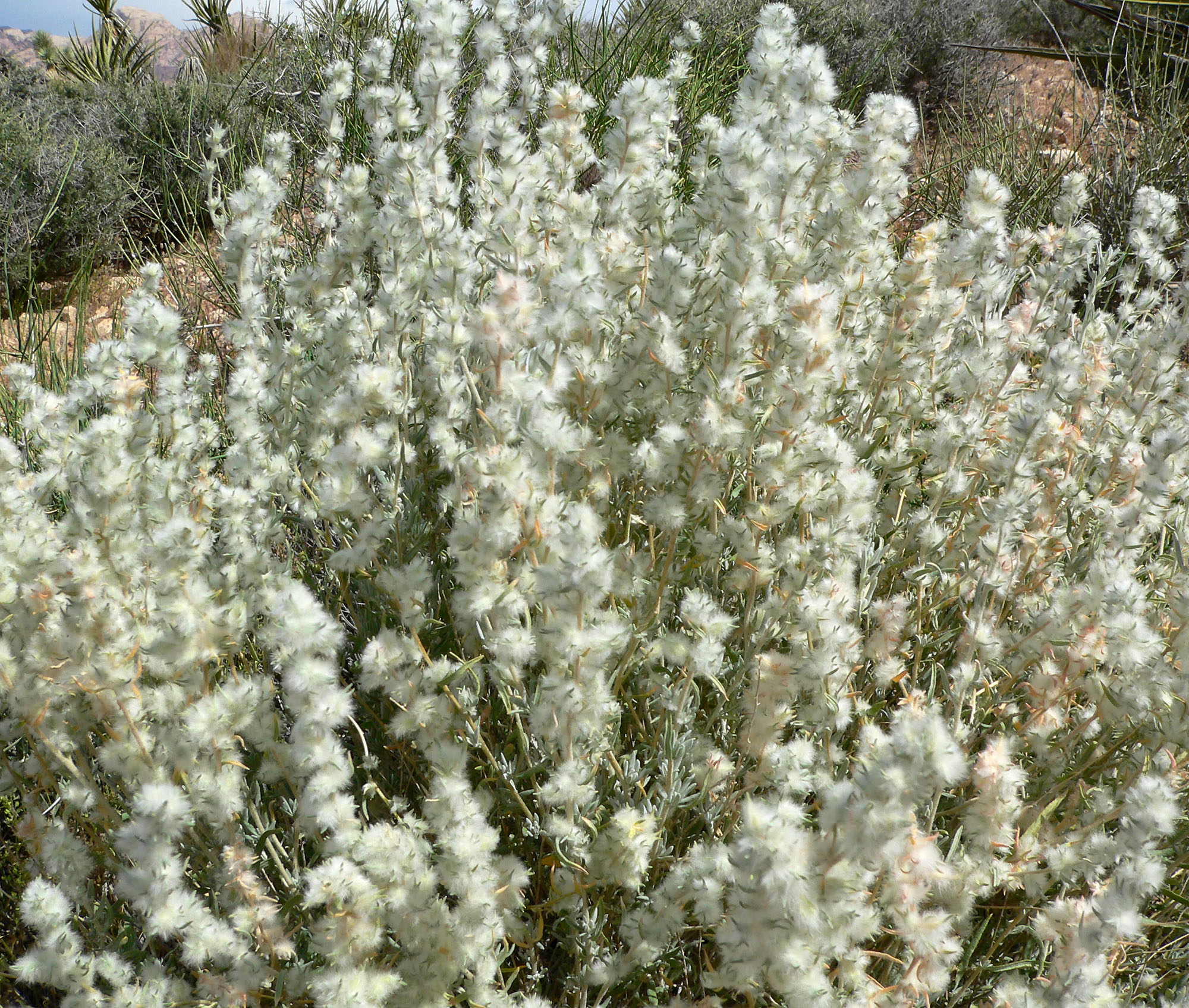
- Krascheninnikovia lanata

Scientific classification
- Kingdom: Plantae
- Clade: Embryophytes
- Clade: Tracheophytes
- Clade: Angiosperms
- Clade: Eudicots
- Order: Caryophyllales
- Family: Amaranthaceae
- Subfamily: Chenopodioideae
- Tribe: Axyrideae
- Genus: Krascheninnikovia; Güldenst. (1772), nom. cons.

Species
- 3, see text

Synonyms
- Ceratoides Gagnebin (1755); Ceratospermum Pers. (1807), nom. superfl.

= Krascheninnikovia =

Genus of flowering plants

Krascheninnikovia is a genus of flowering plants in the subfamily Chenopodioideae of the family Amaranthaceae known as winterfat, so-called because it is a nutritious livestock forage. They are known from Eurasia and western North America. These are hairy perennials or small shrubs which may be monoecious or dioecious. They bear spike inflorescences of woolly flowers.

== Description ==
The species of Krascheninnikovia are erect subshrubs or shrubs. The plants are densely covered with dendroid stellate hairs and additionally with simple, unbranched hairs. The alternate leaves stand solitary or grouped in fascicles, and can be petiolate or nearly sessile. The flat, non-fleshy leaf blades are linear to narrowly lanceolate to ovate, with entire margins, and truncate, cuneate, rounded, or subcordate base.

The flowers are unisexual, the plants can be monoecious or dioecious. Male flowers form an interrupted spike or subcapitate inflorescence of glomeruled, ebracteate flowers. These consist of 4 basally connate perianth segments, that are ovate or elliptic, membranous and abaxially hairy; and 4 stamens with oblong anthers and linear, exserted filaments. Female flowers sitting single or paired axillary, enclosed by 2 hairy bracteoles, that are connate in the lower part, compressed to slightly keeled, with 4 hornlike tips; a perianth is missing, the female flowers consist just of an ovary with a short style and 2 elongated stigmas.

The hairy fruit enclosed by the bracteoles is ovate and compressed, its membranous pericarp is free from the seed. The vertically orientated seed has a brown thin seed coat covered with white hairs. The embryo is nearly annular or horseshoe-shaped and encloses the copious perisperm.

The chromosome base number is x=9, for example 2n=36 for Krascheninnikovia ceratoides, 2n=18 and 2n=36 for Krascheninnikovia lanata.

== Distribution ==
The species of Krascheninnikovia are mostly distributed in Eurasia, two species occur in North America. In Europe, Krascheninnikovia ceratoides is the only species, it is native in eastern and Southern Europe, Winterfat occurs in dry valley bottoms, on flat mesas, and on hillsides, at elevations between 2,400 and 9,300 feet (730 and 2,830 m). It is drought resistant and intolerant of flooding, excess water, or acidic soils. Seed production especially in desert regions, is dependent on precipitation. Good seed years occur when there is appreciable summer precipitation and little browsing. Winterfat occurs on well-drained, calcareous soils with low to moderate salt concentrations.

== Systematics ==
Krascheninnikovia has been first described in 1772 by Johann Anton Güldenstädt. The genus was named for the Russian botanist and explorer of Siberia and Kamchatka, Stepan Krasheninnikov. The type species is Krascheninnikovia ceratoides (L.) Gueldenst. The older name Ceratoides had to be rejected: it referred just to a pre-Linnaeus description by Joseph Pitton de Tournefort, comprising the type of the related genus Ceratocarpus.

The genus Krascheninnikovia belongs to the subfamily Chenopodioideae of the family Amaranthaceae. After phylogenetic research, it was grouped into the tribe Axyrideae.

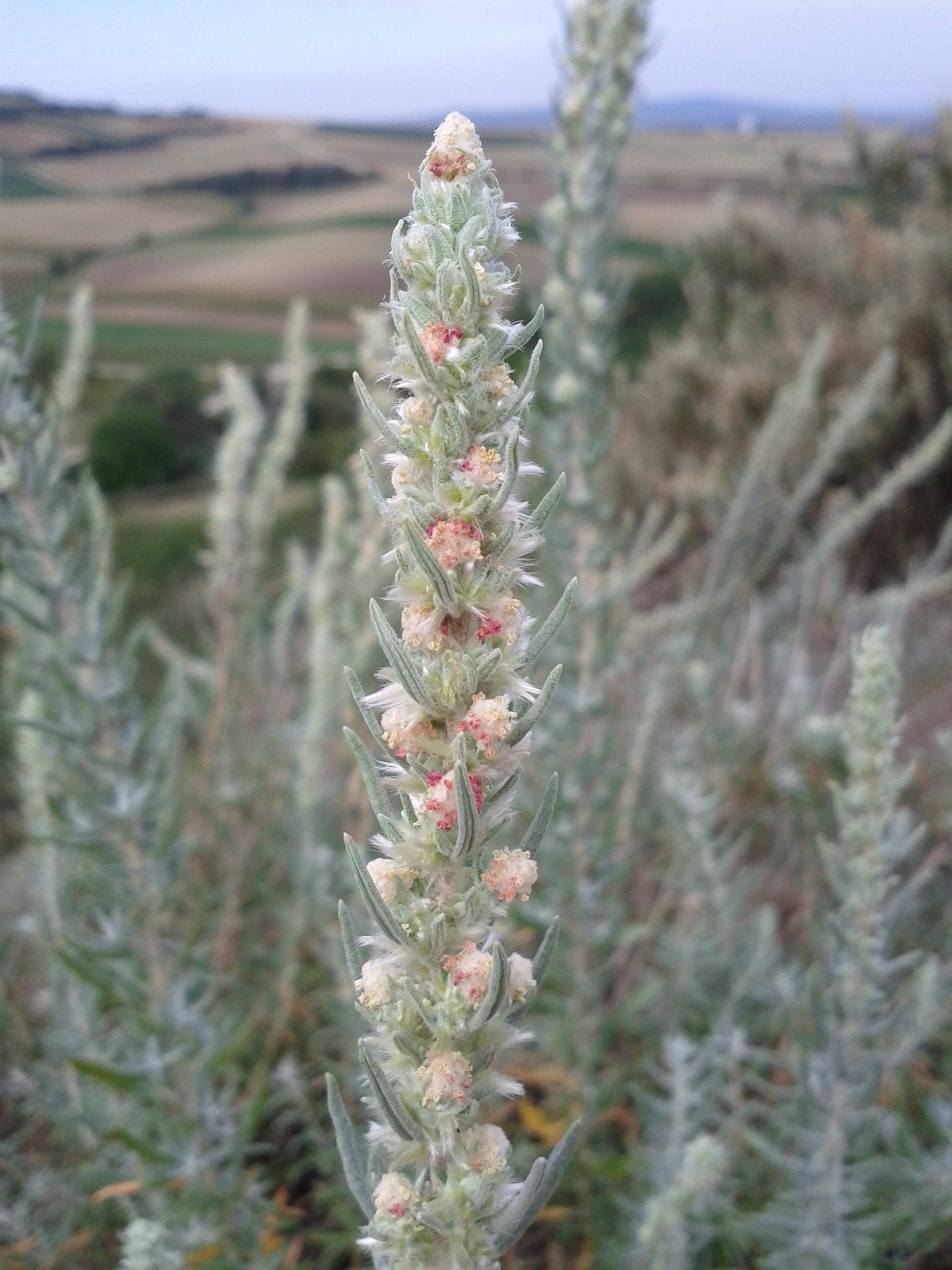
Krascheninnikovia ceratoides

The genus includes three accepted species:)

- Krascheninnikovia ceratoides (L.) Gueldenst. (including Krascheninnikovia lenensis (Kumin.) Tzvelev) – from Europe to East Asia
- Krascheninnikovia fruticulosa (Pazij.) Czerep. – in Asia
- Krascheninnikovia lanata (Pursh) A.Meeuse & A.Smit – in North America
