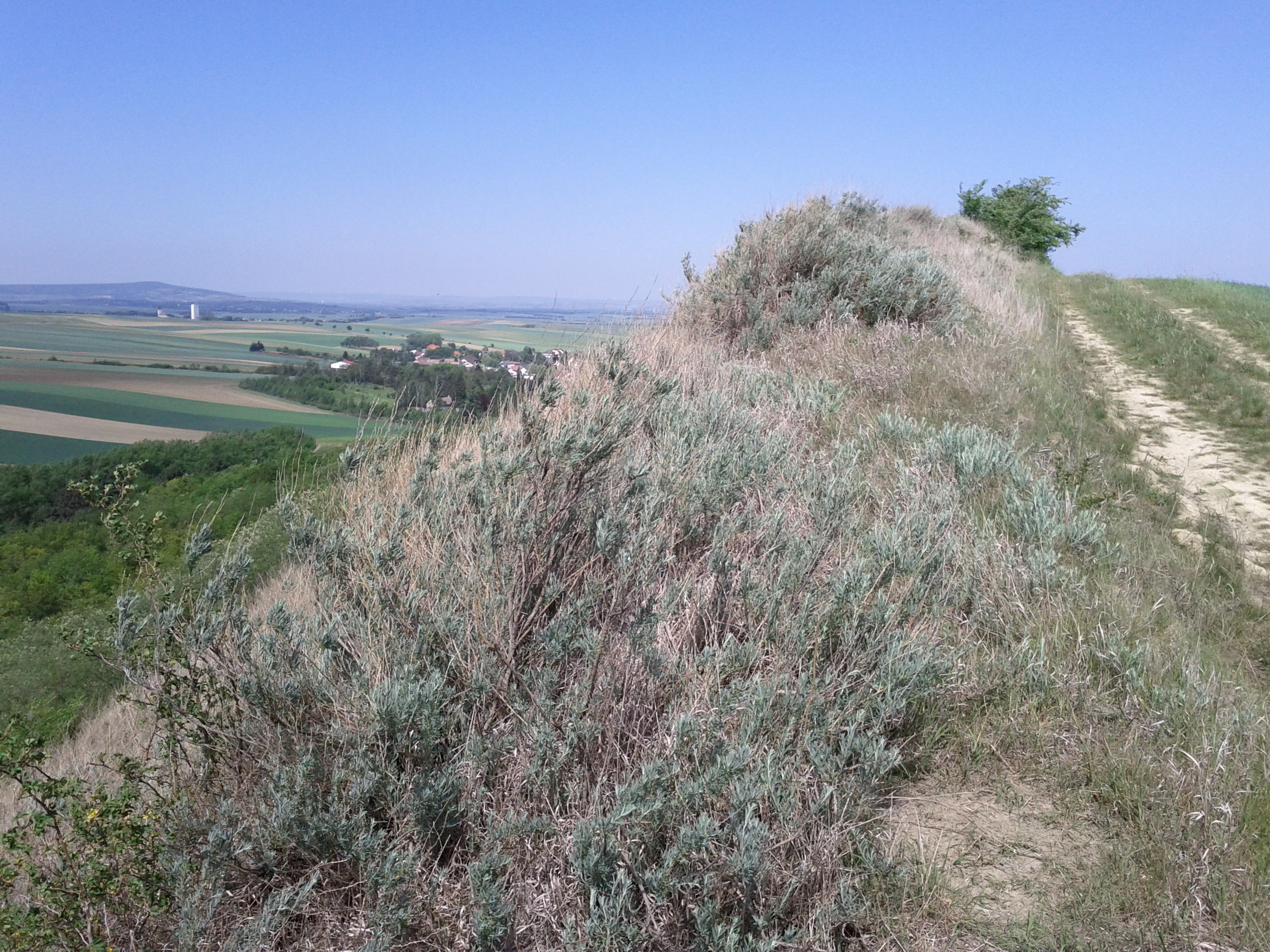
- Krascheninnikovia ceratoides in Austria

Scientific classification
- Kingdom: Plantae
- Clade: Embryophytes
- Clade: Tracheophytes
- Clade: Spermatophytes
- Clade: Angiosperms
- Clade: Eudicots
- Order: Caryophyllales
- Family: Amaranthaceae
- Genus: Krascheninnikovia
- Species: K. ceratoides

Binomial name
- Krascheninnikovia ceratoides (L.) Gueldenst.

Synonyms
- Achyranthes papposa Forssk.; Axyris ceratoides L.; Ceratoides arborescens (Losinsk.) C.P.Tsien & C.G.Ma; Ceratoides compacta (Losinsk.) Soják; Ceratoides compacta (Losinsk.) C.P. Tsien & C.G. Ma; Ceratoides compacta var. longipilosa C.P.Tsien & C.G.Ma; Ceratoides eversmanniana (Stschegl. ex I.G.Borshch.) Botsch. & Ikonn.; Ceratoides intramongolica H.C.Fu, J.Y.Yang & S.Y.Zhao; Ceratoides latens Reveal & N.H.Holmgren; Ceratoides lenensis (Kuminova) Jurtzev & Kamelin; Ceratoides papposa Botsch. & Ikonn.; Ceratoides pungens (Popov) Czerep.; Ceratospermum papposum Pers.; Diotis ceratoides (L.) Willd.; Diotis ferruginea T.Nees; Eurotia arborescens Losinsk.; Eurotia ceratoides (L.) C.A. Mey.; Eurotia ceratoides var. ferruginea (T.Nees) Boiss.; Eurotia ceratoides var. lanata (Pursh) Kuntze; Eurotia ceratoides var. latifolia Moq.; Eurotia ceratoides var. pratensis Losinsk.; Eurotia ceratoides var. pungens Popov; Eurotia ceratoides var. tenuifolia Moq.; Eurotia ceratoides f. tragacanthoides Losinsk.; Eurotia ceratoides var. tragacanthoides (Losinsk.) Iljin; Eurotia compacta Losinsk.; Eurotia eversmanniana Stschegl. ex I.G.Borshch.; Eurotia ferruginea (T.Nees) Boiss. ex Moq.; Eurotia lanata (Pursh) K.Koch; Eurotia lanata var. subspinosa (Rydb.) Kearney & Peebles; Eurotia lenensis Kuminova; Eurotia prostrata Losinsk.; Eurotia pungens (Popov) Pazij; Krascheninnikovia arborescens (Losinsk.) Czerep.; Krascheninnikovia ceratoides var. pratensis (Losinsk.) Gang Yang; Krascheninnikovia ceratoides subsp. tragacanthoides Ovcz. & Kinzikaeva; Krascheninnikovia compacta (Losinsk.) Grubov; Krascheninnikovia compacta var. longipilosa (C.P.Tsien & C.G.Ma) Mosyakin; Krascheninnikovia intramongolica (H.C.Fu, J.Y.Yang & S.Y.Zhao) Z.Y.Zhu, C.Z.Liang & W.Wang; Krascheninnikovia latens J.F.Gmel.; Krascheninnikovia lenensis (Kuminova) Tzvelev; Krascheninnikovia longipilosa (C.P.Tsien & C.G.Ma) G.L.Chu; Krascheninnikovia pungens (Popov) Czerep.; Krascheninnikovia pungens Podlech; Saltia papposa (Forssk.) Moq.

= Krascheninnikovia ceratoides =

Species of plant

Krascheninnikovia ceratoides, or the Pamirian winterfat, is a plant species native to Central Europe and Southern Europe, North Africa, and parts of Asia. It has been reported from Russia, China, Mongolia, Pakistan, Kazakhstan, Uzbekistan, Iran, Afghanistan, Ukraine, Egypt, Morocco, Spain, Austria, Slovakia, Czech Republic, and Romania.

Krascheninnikovia ceratoides is a shrub up to 100 cm tall, appearing whitish because of a thick layer of finely branched hairs. Leaves are highly variable in shape, up to 25 mm long.The flowers are tiny, covered with long silky hairs, borne in axillary clusters and a terminal raceme; staminate (male, pollen-producing) and pistillate (female, seed-producing) organs are in different flowers on the same plant. The fruit is egg-shaped, about 3 mm long, with 4 angles and 2 horns.
