= Samuel Sharp (surgeon) =

English surgeon and author

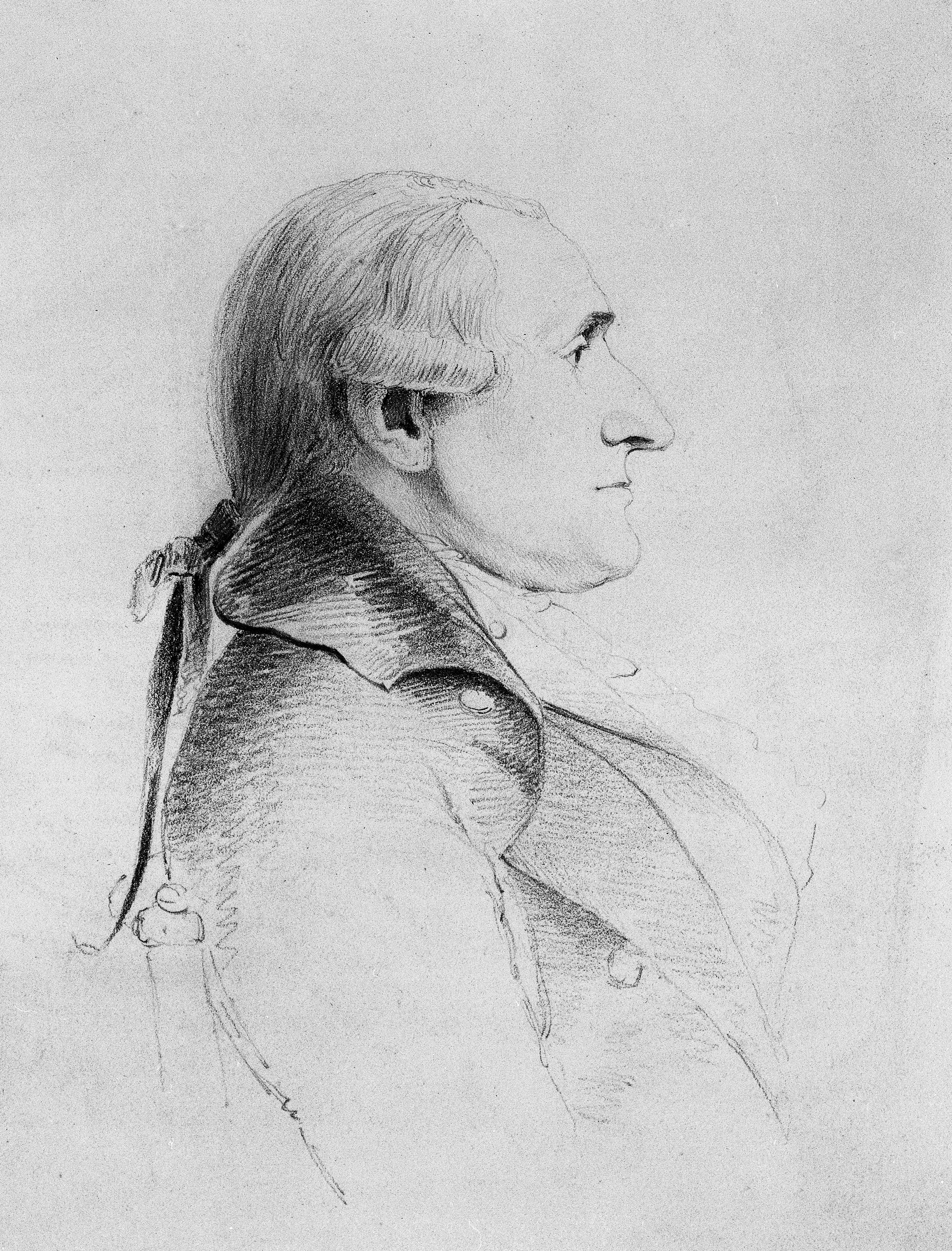
Samuel Sharp

Samuel Sharp FRS (1709–1778) was an English surgeon and author. As a surgeon at Guy's Hospital, from 1733 to 1757, was internationally famous. His A Treatise on the Operations of Surgery (1st ed., 1739), was the first British study focuses exclusively on operative technique.

== Development ==
He was born about 1709. He was bound apprentice for seven years to William Cheselden, surgeon at St. Thomas's Hospital, on 2 March 1724. He paid £300. when his indentures were signed, the money being found by Elizabeth Sale, a widow living at Hertford. Sharp appears to have spent a part of his apprenticeship in France, where he made the acquaintance of Voltaire, and acquired a knowledge of French surgery which afterwards stood him in good stead. He was admitted a freeman of the Company of Barbers and Surgeons of London on 7 March 1731, obtained his diploma on 4 April 1732, and on 6 June, when he was living in Ingram Court, Fenchurch Street, he was admitted to the Company.

== Medical career ==
He was elected surgeon to Guy's Hospital on 9 August 1733, the year in which Cheselden published his ‘Osteographia,’ (or anatomy of bones). Sharp is said to have assisted his former master in the preparation of this great work, and Cheselden introduced a portrait of Belchier and Sharp into the frontispiece. Sharp rapidly acquired an extensive practice. In 1746 want of leisure, probably combined with frequent attacks of asthma, led him to resign to William Hunter the ‘course of anatomical lectures, to which were added the operations of surgery, with the application of bandages.’ He had been in the habit of delivering the lectures in Covent Garden on winter afternoons to a society of navy surgeons. Out of these lectures grew Hunter's Great Windmill Street school of medicine, which laid the foundations of modern medical teaching.

Sharp paid a second visit to Paris in 1749, and was elected a member of the Paris Royal Society, having been made a Fellow of the Royal Society of London on 13 April 1749. The direct outcome of this journey was ‘A Critical Enquiry into the Present State of Surgery,’ published in 1754, a work which gives an interesting account of the contemporary practice of surgery, especially in French schools.

== Legacy ==
Sharp resigned his appointment at Guy's Hospital on 23 September 1757 on the ground of ill-health; but he continued to practise until 1765, when he set out on a winter tour through Italy. The results were published in his plain-speaking Letters from Italy, which appeared in August 1766. (The book gains a mention from a character in Tobias Smollett's epistolary novel The Expedition of Humphry Clinker.) Sharp died on 24 March 1778. Sharp's work attracted notice on the Continent, and he is interesting as the immediate link connecting the old with modern surgery. Cheselden was his master; Hunter, if not actually his pupil, learnt from him by tradition. Among other improvements in surgical instruments introduced by Sharp, he is said to have been the first to suggest that the barrel of a trephine should be conical.

Besides the Letters from Italy, Sharp published:

- A Treatise on the Operations of Surgery, London, 1739; 2nd edit. 1739; 3rd edit. 1740; 4th edit. 1743; 6th edit. 1751; 8th edit. 1761; 10th edit. 1782; French translation by A. F. Jault, Paris, 1741, Portuguese by J. C. Sarmento, London, 1744
- A Critical Enquiry into the Present State of Surgery, London, 1750; 2nd edit. 1750; 3rd edit. 1754; 4th edit. 1761; translated into French 1751, Spanish 1753, German 1756, and Italian 1774. This clearly written book in good English contains 13 short chapters upon hernia, lithotomy, amputations, concussion of the brain, tumours of the gall-bladder, extirpation of the tonsils, hydrocele, and a few other matters.

To the Philosophical Transactions Sharp contributed two papers in 1753 on ‘A New Method of Opening the Cornea in order to Extract the Crystalline Humour,’ and in 1754 a paper ‘On the Styptic Powers of Agaric.’ In addition, he reviewed the surgical portion of James Greive's translation of 'A. Cornelius Celcus of Medicine' published in 1756.
