= James Grieve (Scottish translator) =

Scottish translator, writer and physician

James Grieve FRS (died 1773) was a Scottish translator, writer and physician. As translator of ‘Celsus,’ his work helped restore a path to classical medicine.

== Early years ==
Grieve studied medicine at the University of Edinburgh, graduating with an MD in 1733.

== Russian Service ==
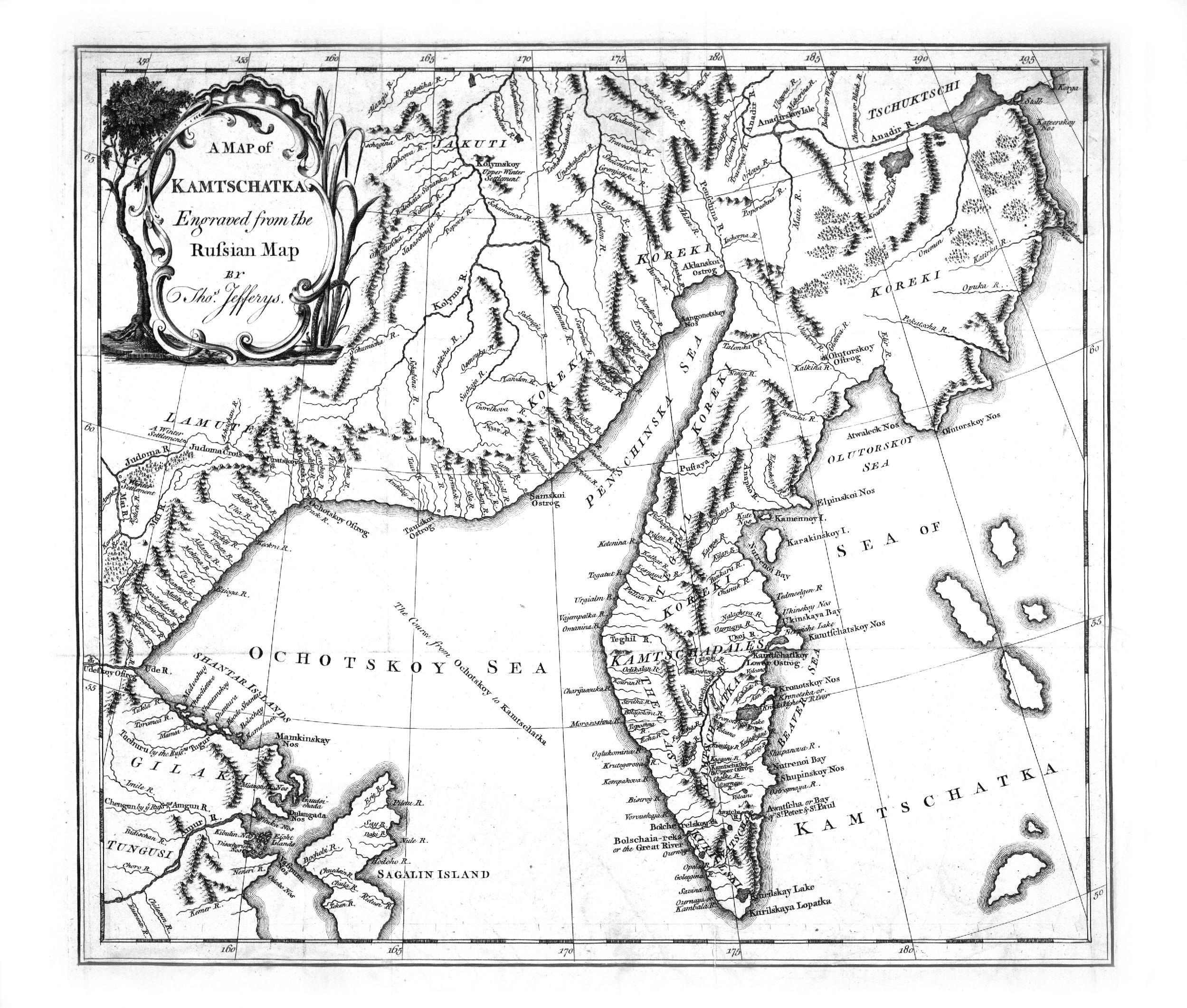
Thomas Jefferys engraved this Russian map depicting discoveries made during the Second Kamchatka Expedition conveyed in Stepan Krasheninnikov's book.

Grieve was authorised to practice medicine in Russia in 1734, arriving two years ahead of his contemporary James Mounsey, future archiater to Empress Elizabeth. He spent several years as physician to the Kazan,' moved to Orenburg, and then to Saint Petersburg, initially to the army hospital as physician to the guards regiment, and ultimately as Shtadt-fizik (City Physician). In 1751 he transferred to Moscow as Shtadt-fizik. He was created licentiate from the Royal College of Physicians in 1753 and selected fellow to the Royal College of Physicians of Edinburgh on 6 February, a position he held several years to include the assignment as physician to the Empress of Russia. He translated for publication the "History of Kamtschatka," in 1763 as his Russian service ended. This book details the overland portion of the 1733-1743 exploration into the vast eastern expanses of Asia initiated under Emperor Peter I and concluded during Empress Elizabeth's reign.

== Return to England ==
In 1764 he was appointed physician to St Thomas's Hospital, and in the following year to the Charterhouse. He was elected a fellow of the Royal Society 2 March 1769, and became a fellow of the College of Physicians 'speciali gratiâ' 30 September 1771. He died 9 July 1773 at his official residence in Charterhouse Square. He is described by Dr Lettsom, who was his pupil, as an amiable man and unassuming scholar.

== Translations ==
His published translations include two works: 'A. Cornelius Celsus of Medicine in eight books, translated, with Notes Critical and Explanatory, by James Grieve, M.D.' A third edition of this translation, was published in 1837, 'carefully revised with additional notes by George Futvoye', Samuel Sharp reviewed the text portions related to surgery while on staff at Guy's Hospital; and Stepan Krasheninnikov's 'History of Kamtschatka...,’ published at London 1763, Gloucester 1764, and afterwards at Saint Petersburg.

== Family ==
He married Miss Anne Le Grand (d. 1767) in late 1764 and together they had one daughter, Anne, who survived both parents.

== Selected bibliography ==
1. A. Cornelius Celcus of Medicine
2. The History of Kamtschatka and the Kurilski Islands, with the Countries Adjacent, (Gloucester 1764).

== Sources ==
"Grieve, James" . Dictionary of National Biography. London: Smith, Elder & Co. 1885–1900.
