= Johann Georg Gmelin =

German naturalist and botanist (1709–1755)

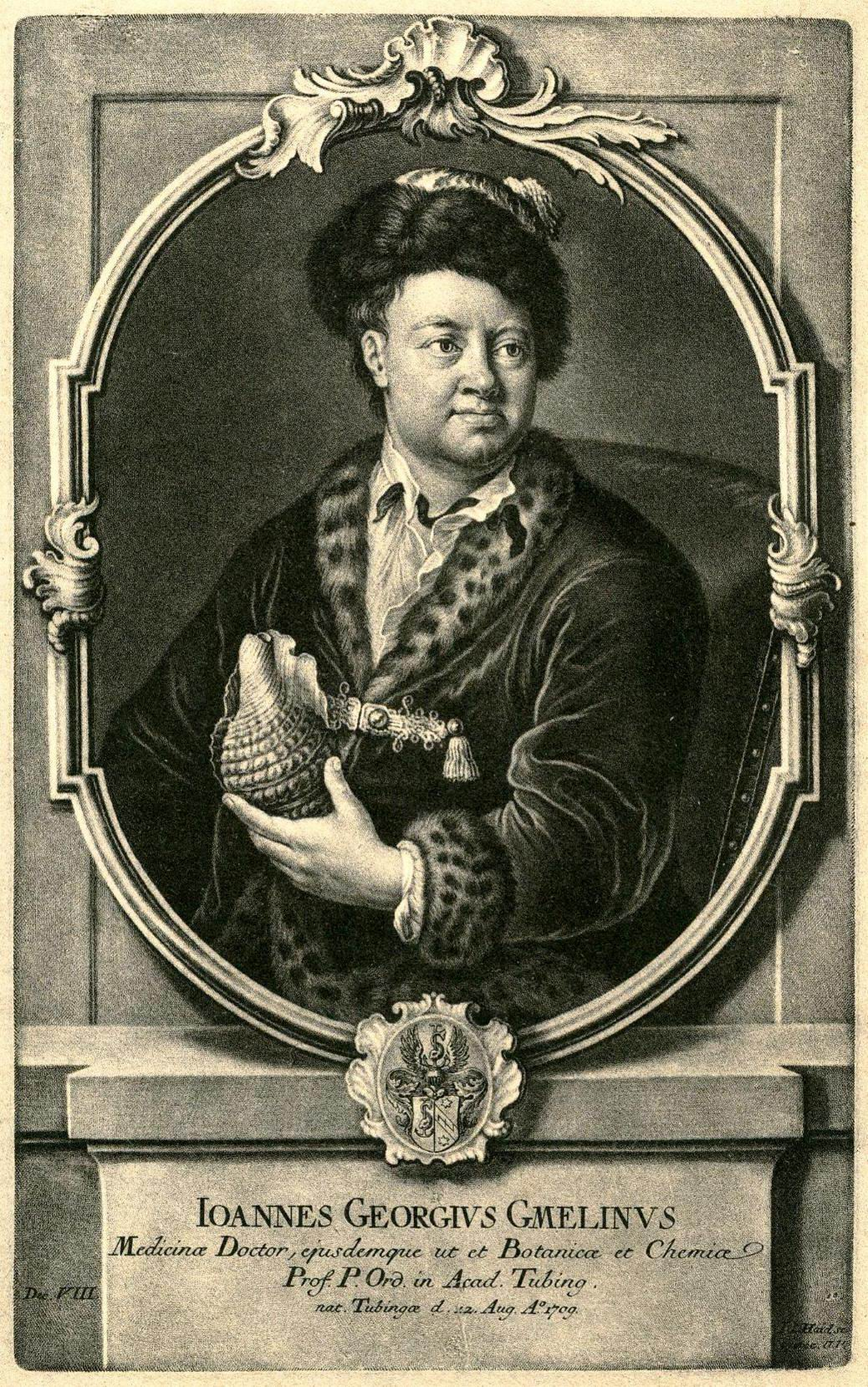
- Born: 8 August 1709; Tübingen, Duchy of Württemberg, Holy Roman Empire
- Died: 20 May 1755 (aged 45); Tübingen, Duchy of Württemberg, Holy Roman Empire
- Other names: Ioanne Georgio Gmelin, Иоганн Георг Гмелин
- Education: University of Tübingen
- Occupations: Physicist and botanist
- Known for: Exploring Siberia
- Relatives: Samuel Gottlieb Gmelin (nephew)
- Scientific career
- Institutions: Russian Academy of Sciences; University of St. Petersburg; University of Tübingen
- Author abbrev. (botany): J.G.Gmel.

Johann Georg Gmelin (8 August 1709 – 20 May 1755) was a German naturalist, botanist and geographer.

== Early life and education ==
Gmelin was born in Tübingen, the son of a professor at the University of Tübingen. He was a gifted child and began attending university lectures at the age of 14. In 1727, he graduated with a medical degree at the age of 18. He then travelled to St Petersburg and obtained a fellowship at the Academy of Sciences in 1728. He lectured at the university from 1730, and in the following year was appointed professor of chemistry and natural history.

At his suggestion, Johann Amman left Hans Sloane in London to take up a post in St Petersburg. The final two volumes of Johann Christian Buxbaum's (1693–1730) Centuria were published posthumously by Gmelin.

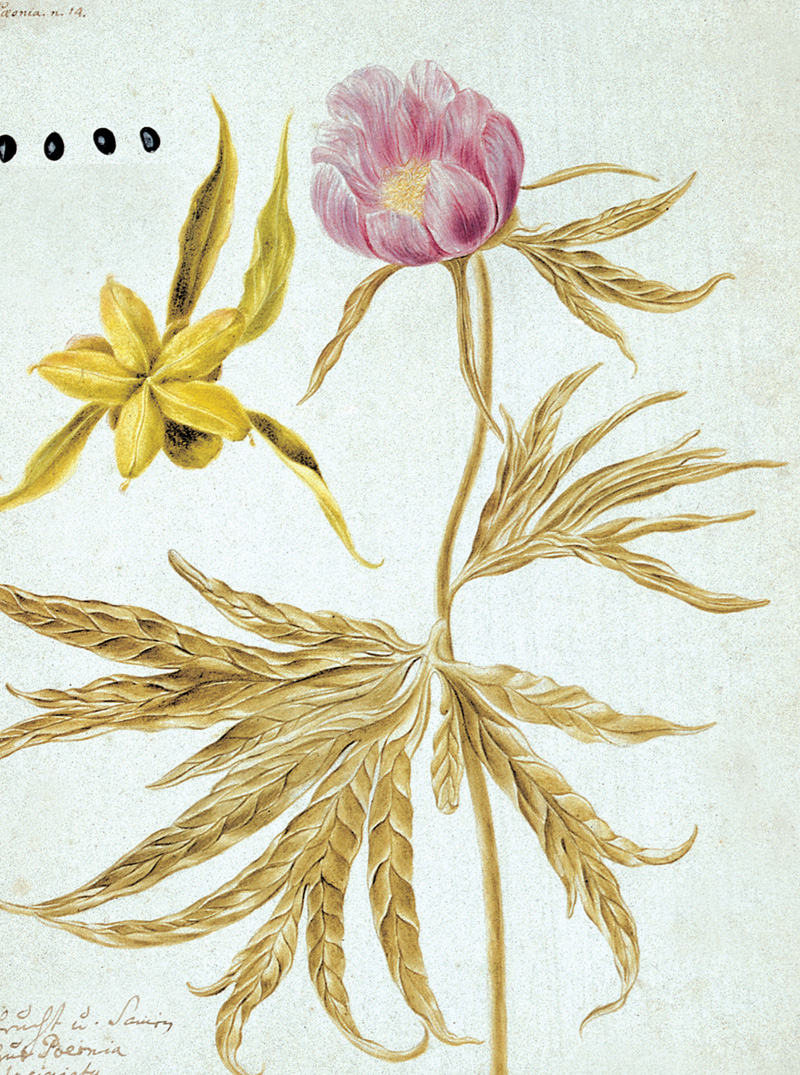
Paeonia anomala L. from Flora Sibirica

== The Second Kamchatka Expedition ==
Gmelin was elected one out of three professors to join Vitus Bering’s Second Kamchatka Expedition (1733–1743). During the early part of the expedition - leaving St Petersburg in August 1733 - he was accompanied by the young student Stepan Krasheninnikov. They travelled together through the Ural Mountains and western Siberia to Yeniseysk. He described the position of the Yenisey river as a boundary between Europe and Asia and participated in measuring the lowest temperature ever recorded at Yeniseysk. He was also the first person to measure the fact that the level of the Caspian Sea was below that of the Mediterranean Sea. He eventually reached Bering’s headquarters at Yakutsk in September 1736. Unfortunately, Gmelin's residence burned on November 8, destroying all his natural history collections and notes plus part of his library. The subsequent summer, he made as many re-collections of specimens as possible to replace the loss. His Flora Sibirica (1747–1769) was based on his observations and collections. It contains descriptions of 1178 species, 294 of which he illustrated. His nephew Samuel Gottlieb Gmelin assisted him in editing the final two volumes. A fifth volume of Flora Sibirica, mainly on cryptogams, was written by Stepan Krasheninnikov, but was never printed. Gmelin also described the journey in his Reise durch Sibirien von dem Jahr 1733 bis 1743 (1751–1752).

== Later life ==
Gmelin returned to the University of Tübingen in 1747 and became professor of medicine and, in 1751, director of the university's botanic garden. His travel description was published there. It was translated to French and Dutch, but not to Russian, "because it contained uncomplimentary observations and comments on Russians".

Gmelin was elected a foreign member of the Royal Swedish Academy of Sciences in 1749.

The plant genus Gmelina (Lamiaceae) and several dozen plant and animal species are named after him. Although possibly some are named after Johann Friedrich Gmelin.

== Sources ==
- "Гмелины" . Brockhaus and Efron Encyclopedic Dictionary (in Russian). 1906.

== Complete Bibliography ==
- on WorldCat
- Digital edition: Johann Georg Gmelin 1709–1755 : der Erforscher Sibiriens; ein Gedenkbuch by the University and State Library Düsseldorf
