= Svarthausane Crags =

Svarthausane Crags (71°40′S 12°40′E) is a group of crags surmounted by Zhil'naya Mountain, forming the northeast end of Sudliche Petermann Range in the Wohlthat Mountains. Discovered and plotted from air photos by German Antarctic Expedition, 1938–39. Replotted from air photos and surveys by Norwegian Antarctic Expedition, 1956–60, and named Svarthausane (the black crags).
