= Great Northern Expedition =

Russian expedition to the coasts of Siberia and Alaska

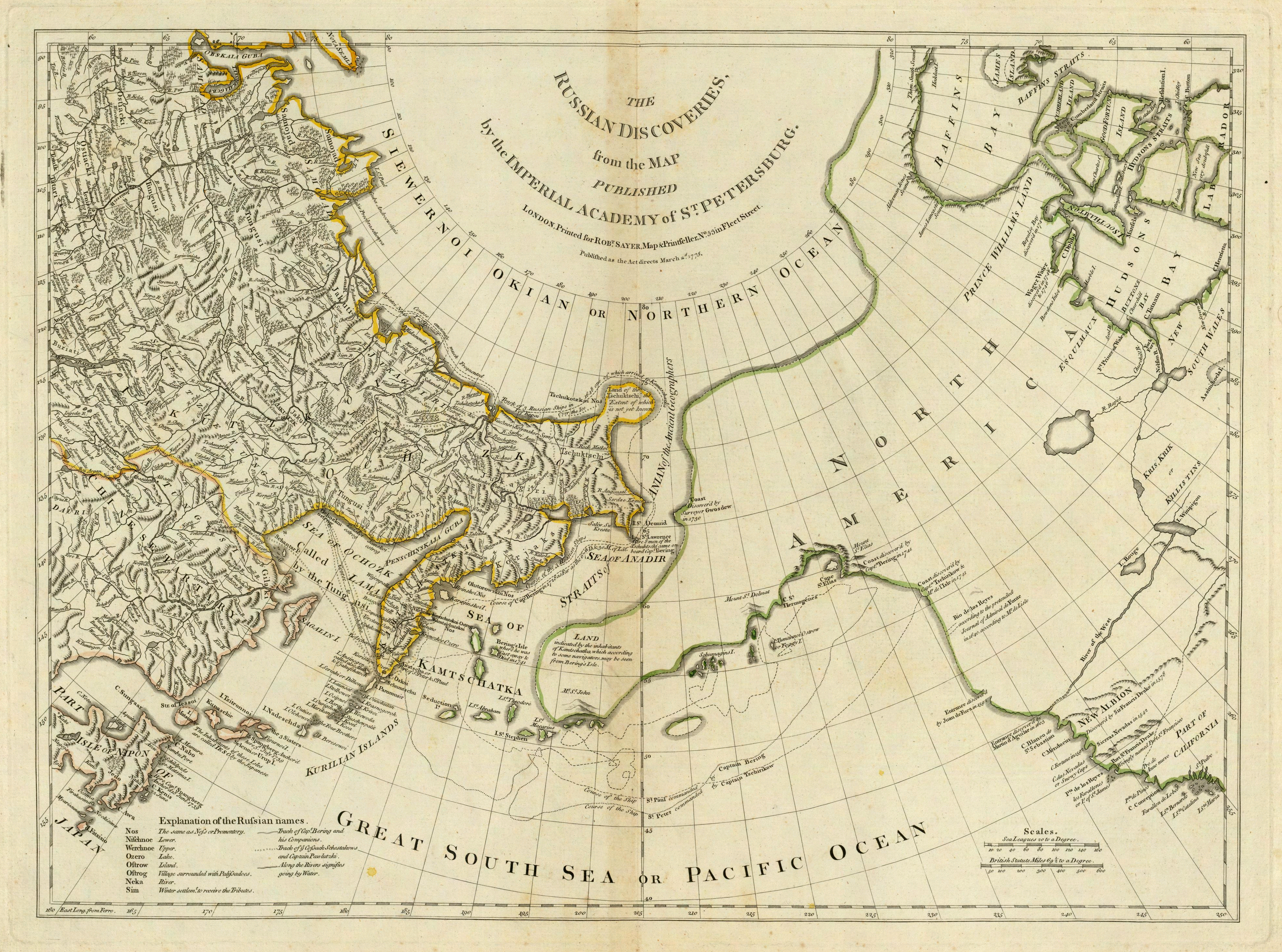
1776 reprint of The Russian Discoveries, a 1775 map prepared by London cartographer Thomas Jefferys showing the coastline first surveyed in the expedition

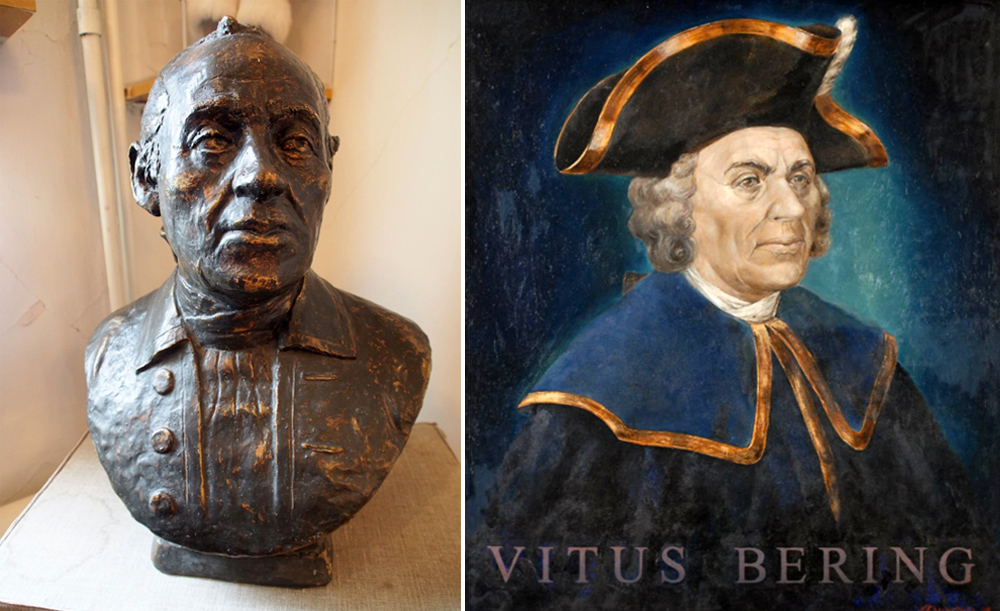
Vitus Bering

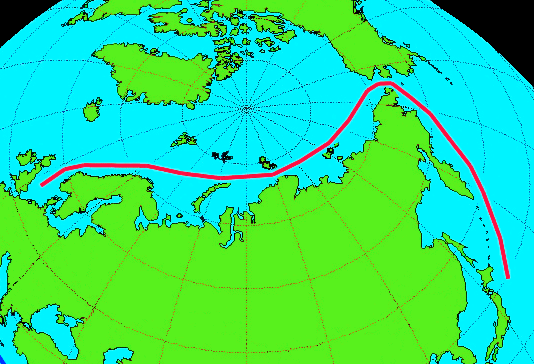
Northern Sea route between Europe and the Pacific

The Great Northern Expedition (Russian: Великая Северная экспедиция) or Second Kamchatka Expedition (Russian: Вторая Камчатская экспедиция) was a major Russian Arctic expedition between roughly 1733 and 1743, which mapped most of the Arctic coast of Siberia and much of the Arctic coast of North America, greatly reducing "white areas" on maps. It was conceived by Russian emperor Peter the Great, and took place under empresses Anna and Elizabeth. Peter hoped for the 18th-century Russian Navy to map a Northern Sea Route from Europe to the Pacific. The endeavour was sponsored by the Admiralty College in Saint Petersburg. The main organiser and leader of the expedition was Vitus Bering, who had been commissioned by Peter to lead the earlier First Kamchatka Expedition (1725 to 1731). With over 3,000 people directly or indirectly involved, it was one of the largest expeditions in history.

The expedition's primary objective was reaching the eastern reaches of Siberia, and from there the western shores of North America. The expedition included the European discovery of Alaska, the Aleutian Islands, the Commander Islands, and Bering Island—as well as a detailed cartographic assessment of the northern and north-eastern coast of Russia and the Kuril Islands. Any large landmass in the North Pacific, as well as any economically viable Northeast Passage sought since the 16th century, were both proven not to exist. Other findings included ethnographic, historic, and scientific research into Siberia and Kamchatka. Its cost was an estimated 1.5 million rubles, financed entirely by the Russian state, equal to roughly one-sixth of state income in 1724.

== Historical context ==
Systematic exploration and scientific discovery in the eastern part of Asia was at the initiative of Tsar Peter the Great (1672–1725).

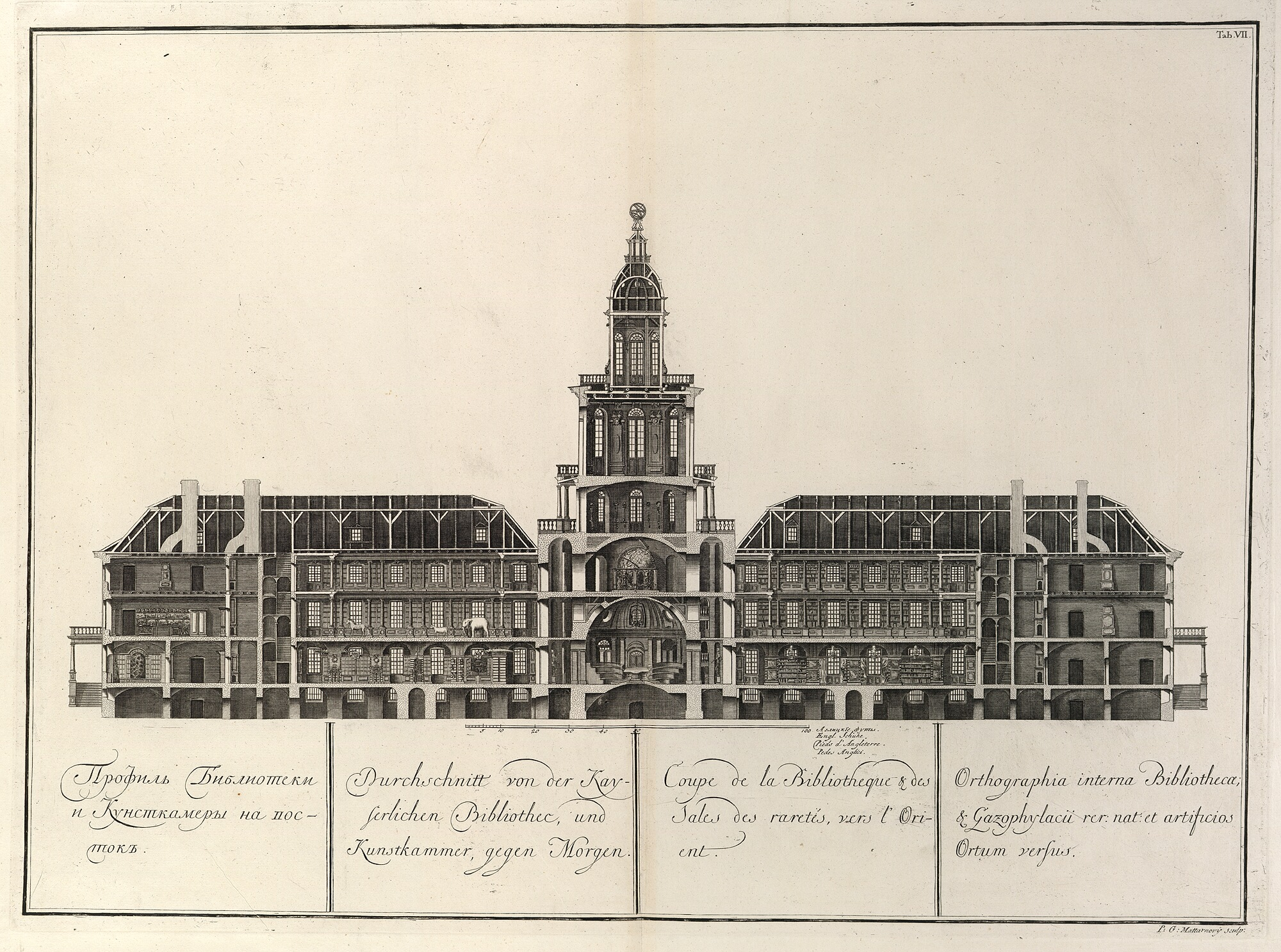
Contemporary depiction of the main building of the Russian Academy of Sciences in Saint Petersburg. Plate entitled Cross-section of the imperial library and art room towards morning, taken from a series of twelve etchings published in 1741. They were the first collaborative work from the workshops of the St. Petersburg academy.

In December 1725, the institution was inaugurated with celebrations. Young, mostly German-speaking scholars formed the core of the academy in its first decades. One of their tasks was to organize and eventually accompany scientific expeditions to then-unexplored parts of the Russian Empire. During Peter's lifetime, the German doctor Daniel Gottlieb Messerschmidt (1685–1735) traveled from 1720 to 1727 to western and central Siberia. This was the beginning of investigation in geography, mineralogy, botany, zoology, ethnography, and philology there, as well as an opening-up of the region to trade. Messerschmidt's Expedition was the first in a long series of scientific explorations of Siberia.

Shortly before his death in February 1725, the Tsar signed an Ukase (decree) authorizing a second great expedition to the east. Over the course of his life, Peter had met many times with German polymath Gottfried Wilhelm Leibniz (1646–1716). At their final meeting at Bad Pyrmont in 1716, Leibniz spoke of a possible land bridge between northeastern Asia and the North America, a point of great relevance in contemporary discussion about the origins of humanity, among other matters. The common origin of humans was generally accepted, but it posed the problem of the origins of human settlements in the New World. To resolve the question of a land bridge, Peter the Great sent in 1719 the geodesists Iwan Jewreinow (1694–1724) and Fjodor Luschin (died 1727) to the easternmost reaches of his empire. The expedition was unsuccessful, at least as to the land bridge question. In 1724, Peter gave the same task to another expedition, the First Kamchatka expedition.

This undertaking, lasting from 1728 to 1730, was led by the Danish-born Russian captain Vitus Jonassen Bering (1681–1741), an officer in the Russian imperial navy since 1704. In the ship St. Gabriel, which had been built at the outlet of the Kamchatka River, Bering made two voyages northeast in successive years (1728 and 1729), and at one point reached 67 degrees north, from which point the coast no longer extended north. He failed to reach North America in either trip, due to adverse weather. Despite the new knowledge about the northeast coast of Siberia, Bering's report led to divisive debate, because the question of a connection with North America remained unanswered. This prompted Bering to propose a second Kamchatka expedition.

== The Expedition ==
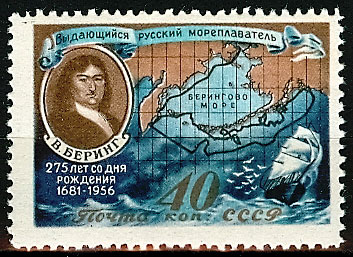
1957 Soviet stamp depicting the Bering voyage

=== Planning and preparation ===
They had originally planned to make one journey in a small boat to survey the coast of the rivers Lena and Yenisei.

The expedition was originally under the control of Bering. Bering's main goal was to discover a passage or strait between America and Asia. During Bering's first expedition he did not complete this goal.

Bering's deputy and successor, Alexi Chirkov or Aleksei Chirikov, was designated navigator of the expedition, as he was a Russian naval officer who had attended school for mathematics and navigation.

=== Bering's expedition plan and the two fleets ===
The central goals in Bering's vision for the new expedition was the survey of the northern coast of the Russian Empire; the expansion of the port of Okhotsk as the gateway to the Pacific Ocean; the search for a sea route to North America and Japan; the opening of access to Siberian natural resources; and finally, the securing of Russian sovereignty in the eastern parts of Asia. The conditions for this gigantic project proved to very favourable. Empress Anna (1693–1740), reigning from 1730, wanted to continue Peter the Great's territorial and economic expansion of the empire. The empress issued an Ukase issued on April 17, 1732, ordering a new expedition. This was followed on May 2 and 15, 1732 by two further Ukases from the Russian Senate to the Admiralty ordering the preparation of the undertaking, and the commissioning of Vitus Bering as its commander. Another Ukase on June 2, 1732, obligated the Russian Academy of Sciences to prepare instructions for the scientific component of the journey. A further Ukase on December 27, 1732, concerned the organization and the formal commissioning of the expedition.

The expedition was separated into three groups, each with further subdivisions. The mission of the northern group was to measure and chart the northern coast of Russia between Arkhangelsk on the White Sea and the Anadyr River in eastern Siberia. The completion of this mission set the foundations for determining the status of the north east passage as a possible connection between Europe and the Pacific Ocean. It was seen as a possible alternative to the land transport used in Russia's trade with China. From "Joao-da-Gama-Land", Bering's group was to set out farther east to the coast of North America. The second Pacific division was under the command of the Danish-born Russian captain Martin Spanberg (d. 1761), who had accompanied Bering on the First Kamchatka Expedition, and had been charged with exploring the sea route from Okhotsk to Japan and China.

=== The academic component ===
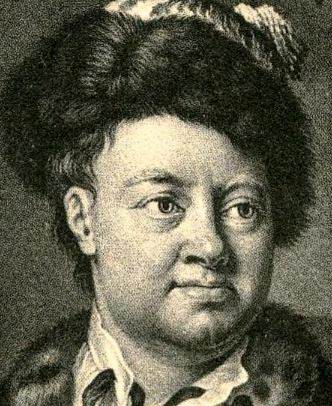
Johann Georg Gmelin

The academic portion of the expedition was led by three professors from the Russian Academy of Sciences. Johann Georg Gmelin (1709–1755) was responsible for research into the plant and animal world as well as the mineral characteristics of the regions to be explored. Gmelin was a natural philosopher and botanist from Württemberg, who had studied in Tübingen and had researched the chemical composition of curative waters. At the urging of his former teacher Georg Bernhard Bilfinger (1693–1750), Gmelin had moved to Russia with him in 1727. There he received a teaching post in chemistry and natural history in 1731.

The academy chose the German historian and geographer Gerhard Friedrich Müller (1705–1783) to head the geographic and historical studies. Müller had studied in Rinteln and Leipzig and had gone to Saint Petersburg in 1725 on the recommendation of a colleague. He became an extraordinary professor in 1730, and a year later was promoted to full professor. He researched Russian history intensively, resulting in the publication in 1732 of the first volume of the Collected History of Russia. Because of Müller's haughty bearing as the chancellor's secretary, there was frequent friction between him and his colleagues. His participation in the expedition was due not only to his desire to have access to historical sources through the expedition, but to spend some time away from Saint Petersburg. It was while engaged in this trip that he developed his concept of Ethnography.

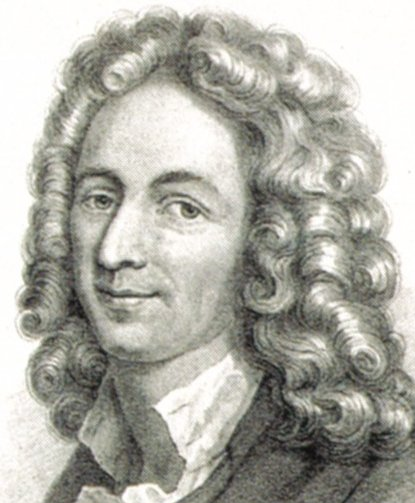
Louis de l'Isle de la Croyere

On the suggestion of the astronomer Joseph Nicolas Delisle (1688–1768), the Academy of Sciences entrusted the job of astronomical and geographic metrology to Delisle's younger brother, Louis de l'Isle de la Croyère (1690–1741). Louis had been working at the academy as an adjunct for astronomy. In 1727 he was promoted to professor and was sent on a three-year exploration survey of Arkhangelsk and the Kola Peninsula, giving him some experience in exploration expeditions.

The participants in the academic portion of the expedition were answerable not to its leader Bering, but to the Academy of Sciences. Each of the professors received a precise commission in regard to the accomplishment of their research program. The directions given to Croyère and his geodesists were written by his brother Joseph Nicolas. Gmelin wrote the instruction for his own research work in natural history. He received further instructions from the anatomist Johannes Georg Duvernoi (1691–1759), who had been part of the teaching faculty in Tübingen. Among other things, Duvernoi wanted to find out whether the peoples of Siberia could move their ears, whether their uvulas were simple, or split into two or three parts, whether Siberian males had milk in their breasts, etc. The physicist Daniel Bernoulli (1700–1782) authored instructions intended for Croyère and Gmelin about the carrying out of series of physical observations. The historian Müller drafted his own plan of work. His chief goals consisted of researching the history of all the cities the expedition would visit and collecting information about the languages of the groups they would meet along the way. The painters Johann Christian Berckhan (died 1751) and Johann Wilhelm Lürsenius (died around 1770), both of whom were part of the academic component, got special instructions. The academy directed all the researchers to prepare reports about the state and the results of the expedition in Russian and Latin. The academic component of the expedition was provided with many astronomical, geodesic, and physical measuring instruments to pursue its research. The governor of Siberia and the various local authorities were ordered to provide the researchers all the aid they required.

=== The voyage of the academic group (1733–1743) ===
The two Pacific divisions of the expedition, led by Martin Spanberg and Vitus Bering, left St. Petersburg in February and April 1733, while the academic group departed on August 8, 1733. In addition to the academy members Gmelin, Müller and Croyère, the group also included the Russian students Stepan Krasheninnikov, Alexei Grolanov, Luka Ivanov, Wassili Tretjakov and Fyodor Popov, the translator (also a student) Ilya Jaontov, the geodesists Andrei Krassilnikov, Moisei Uschakov, Nikifor Tschekin and Alexandr Ivanov, the instrument maker Stepan Ovsjanikov, and the painters Johann Christian Berckhan and Johann Wilhelm Lürsenius. Two soldiers accompanied them for their protection, together with a corporal and a drummer. The group used horses as land transportation and barges on water.

The academic component's travel route took them first to Novgorod, Kazan, Jekaterinburg and Tyumen to Tobolsk, where they arrived in January 1734. In May, Gmelin and Müller separated from the rest of the group, who were put under Croyères' leadership, and travelled until December 1734 to the Irtysh River, and then onwards to Semipalatinsk, Kusnezk near Tomsk, and then onto Yeniseysk. Passing through Krasnoyarsk and Udinsk, they reached Irkutsk in March 1735. They left a portion of their baggage train there and began to survey the area around Lake Baikal. They studied trade in the Sino-Russian border city of Kyakhta in Transbaikal and visited the mines near Argun. They then returned to Irkutsk for the winter. In the meantime, Müller located and investigated area archives and made copies and transcriptions, while Gmelin studied plants he had collected over the course of the summer.

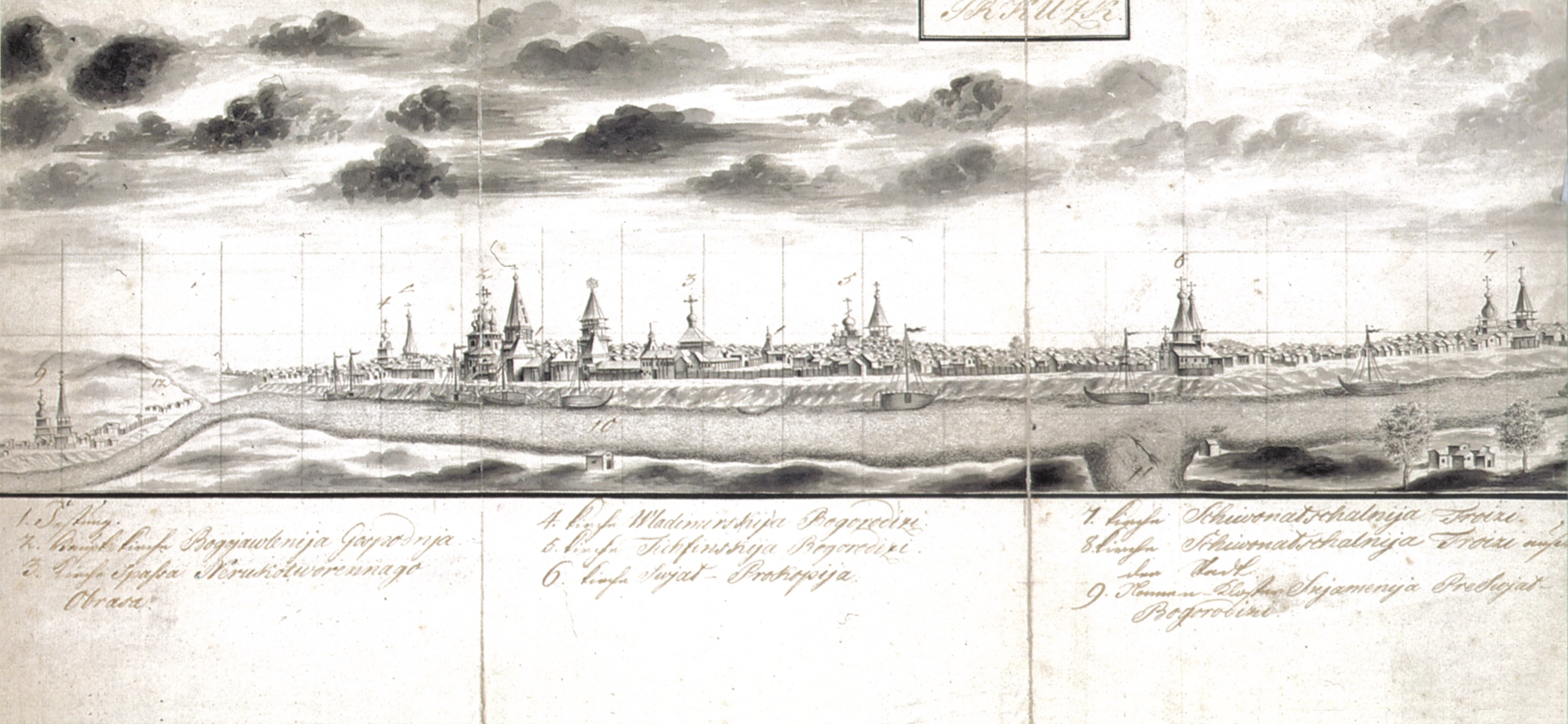
View of Irkutsk. Pencil drawing from 1735.

Their next destination was Yakutsk, where the participants in the academic component were to meet with Bering and were then meant to travel on to Kamchatka together. After their departure from Irkutsk, the two scholars journeyed along the icy Angara River to Ilimsk, where they celebrated Easter. When the Lena River was free from ice, they resumed their voyage, travelling downstream with boats. They reached Yakutsk in September 1736. Almost all the members of the two Pacific divisions of the expedition had gathered there in the meantime, and as a result, Gmelin and Müller experienced difficulties in locating accommodation.

Though aboard the St. Peter with Vitus Bering, Georg Wilhelm Steller was a naturalist by trade and contributed a considerable amount to the scientific observation and recording on the expedition. In his time on the journey, he sampled and recorded many plant and bird species that Europeans had never been exposed to. He was the first European to encounter and document the Aleut people.

== Russian discovery of Alaska ==
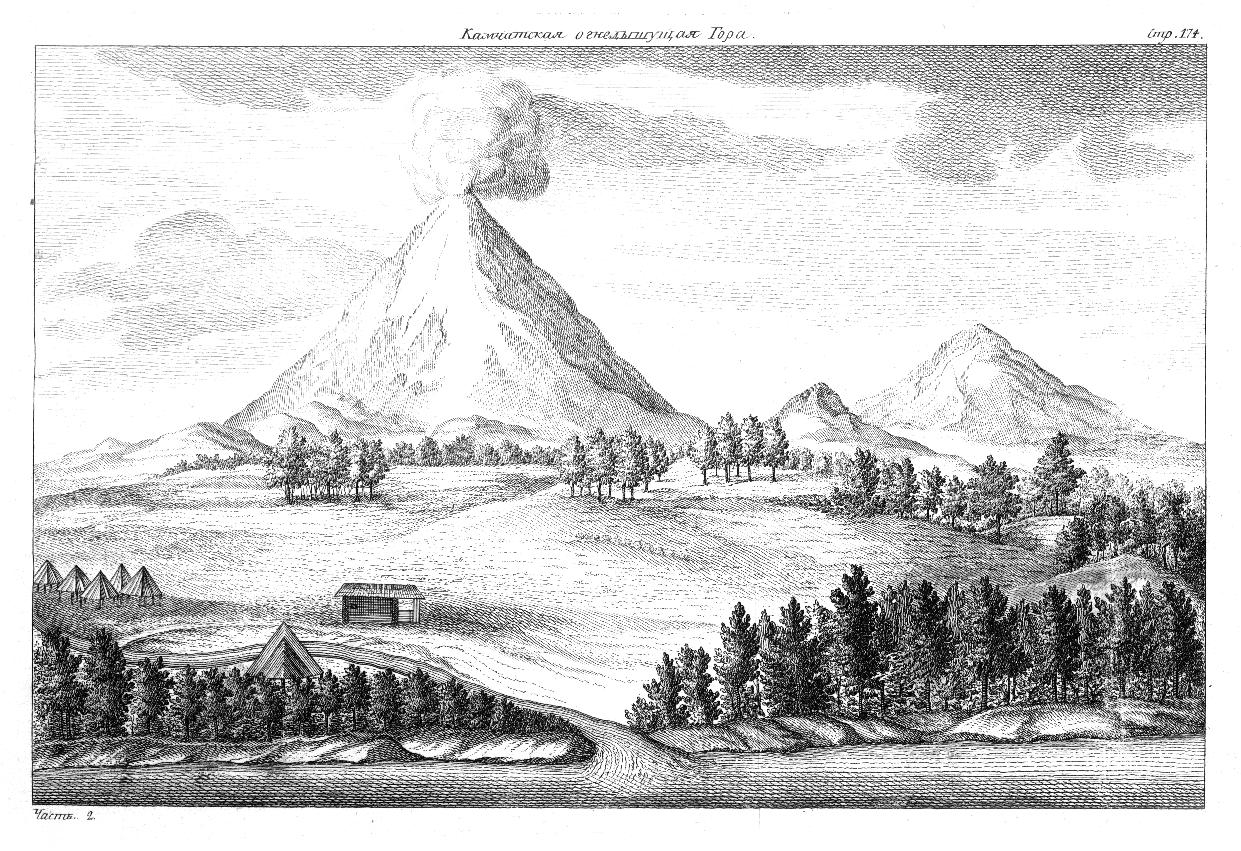
Illustration from Stepan Krasheninnikov's Account of the Land of Kamchatka (1755)

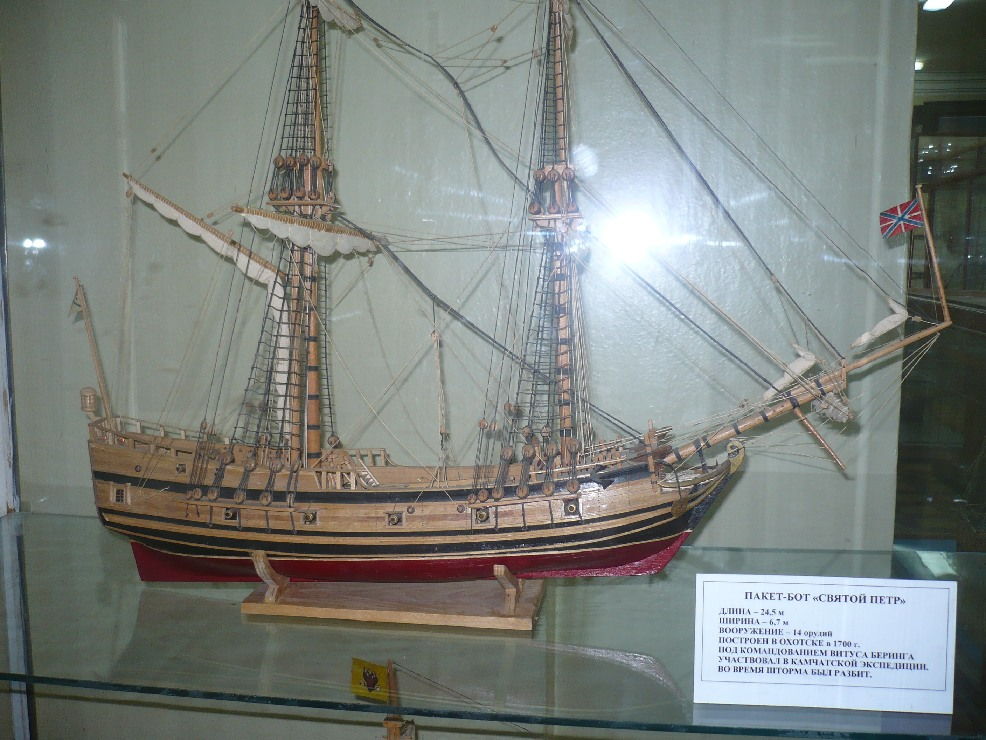
Mock-up of the ship St.Peter which can be seen in The Russian Black Sea Fleet Museum in Sevastopol.

In June 1741, the ships St. Peter and the St. Paul set sail from Petropavlovsk. Six days later they lost sight of each other in a thick fog, but both vessels continued to sail east.

On July 15, Chirikov sighted land, probably the west side of Prince of Wales Island in Southeast Alaska. He sent a group of men ashore in a long boat, making them the first Europeans to land on the northwestern coast of North America. When the first group failed to return, he sent a second, which also vanished. Chirikov weighed anchor and moved on.

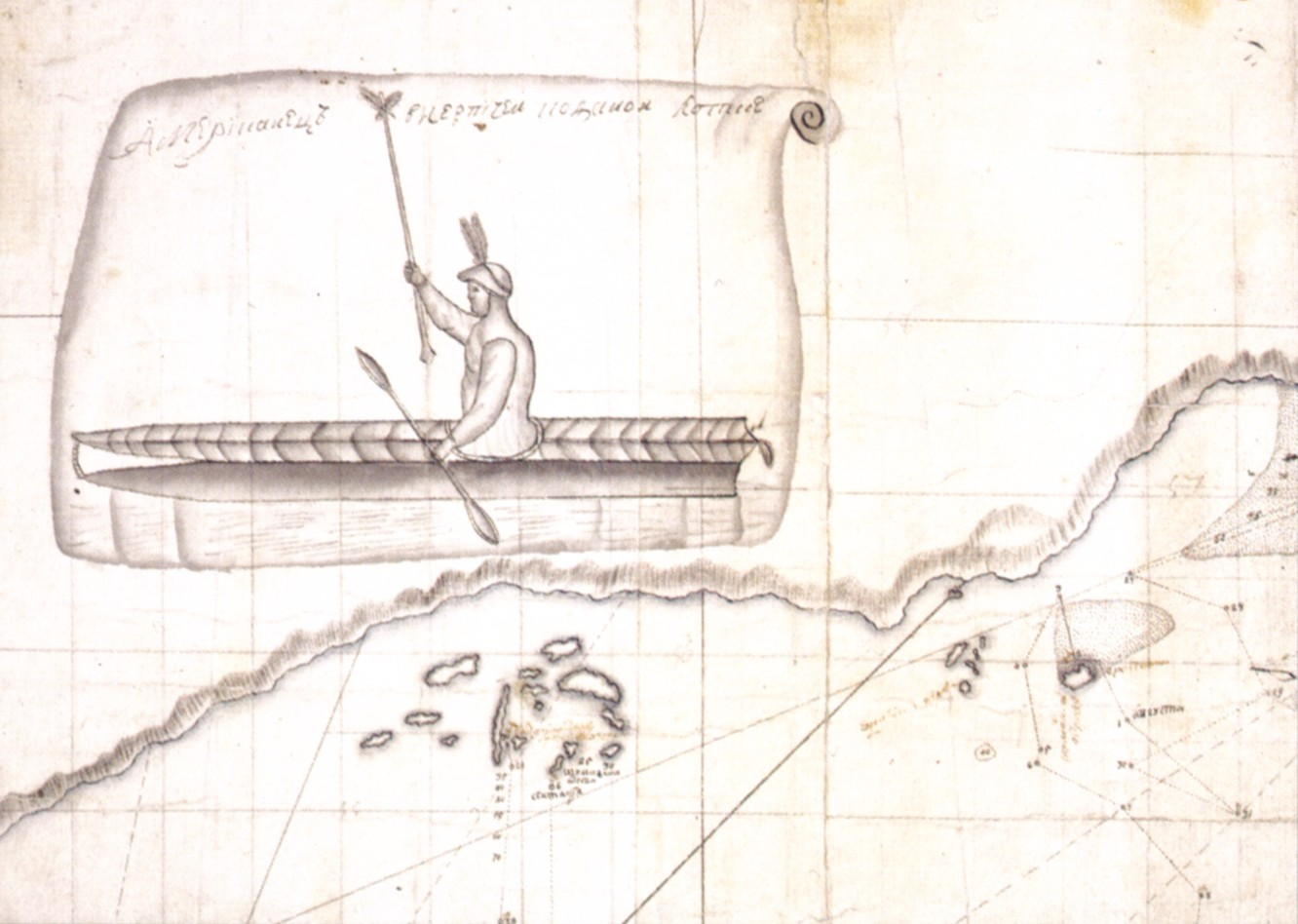
Bering's first encounter with Aleuts at the Shumagin Islands. Drawing by Sven Waxell, the mate of Bering's ship St. Peter.

On roughly July 16, 1741, Bering and the crew of St. Peter sighted a towering peak on the Alaska mainland, Mount Saint Elias. Bering was anxious to return to Russia and turned westward. He later anchored his vessel off Kayak Island while crew members went ashore to explore and find water. Georg Wilhelm Steller, the ship's naturalist and physician, hiked around the island and documented the plants and wildlife. Steller kept a diary that has detailed accounts of their voyage from 1741-1742. It details the hardships and different situations that the crew and himself went through. He notes in his manuscripts of signs of native Kamchatkans and that the crew left them an iron kettle, a pound of tobacco, a Chinese pipe, and a piece of Chinese silk in a "cellar" that was found on the island. Steller also first recorded the Steller's jay that bears his name, as well as having a sea cow, Steller's Sea Cow, named after him.

Chirikov and the St. Paul headed back to Russia in October with news of the land they had found.

Bering's ship was battered by storms, and in November his ship was wrecked on the shore of Bering Island, which many of the crew thought to be the coast of Kamchatka. Steller attempted to treat the crew's scurvy with local leaves and berries he had gathered, but officers dismissed him. Steller and his assistant were some of the few voyagers who did not suffer from scurvy. On the return journey, with only 12 members of the crew able to move and the rigging rapidly failing, the expedition was shipwrecked on what later became known as Bering Island. Almost half of the crew had perished during the voyage. Bering was among the crew to fall sick with scurvy and died on December 8, 1741. The stranded crew wintered on the island, with 28 crew members dying. When weather improved, the 46 survivors built a 40-foot (12 m) boat from the wreckage and set sail for Petropavlovsk in August 1742. Bering's crew reached the shore of Kamchatka in 1742, carrying word of the expedition. The sea otter pelts they brought, soon judged to be the finest fur in the world, would spark Russian settlement in Alaska.

== See also ==
- Northern Sea Route
- Northwest Passage
- Arctic Bridge
- Territorial claims in the Arctic
- Arctic policy of Russia
- Continental shelf of Russia
- List of Russian explorers
