= Stepan Krasheninnikov =

Russian explorer, naturalist, and geographer (1711–1755)

- Степан Крашенинников
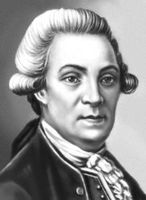
- Stepan Krasheninnikov
- Born: Stepan Petrovich Krasheninnikov; November 11, 1711; Moscow, Russia
- Died: March 8, 1755 (aged 43); Saint Petersburg, Russia
- Other name: Stephan Krascheninnikow
- Occupations: Naturalist and geographer
- Known for: Exploring Kamchatka and Siberia

Stepan Petrovich Krasheninnikov (Russian: Степа́н Петро́вич Крашени́нников; November 11 [O.S. October 31] 1711 – March 8 [O.S. February 25] 1755) was a Russian explorer of Siberia, naturalist and geographer who gave the first full description of Kamchatka in the early 18th century. He was elected to the Russian Academy of Sciences in 1745. The Krasheninnikov Volcano on Kamchatka is named in his honour.

== Early life ==
Krasheninnikov was educated in the Slavic Greek Latin Academy of Moscow (1724–32), where Lomonosov was his class-mate. As part of Vitus Bering’s extensive preparations for the Second Kamchatka Expedition, 12 students from the academy were selected as potential student interns or assistants for the professors – Krasheninnikov being one of them. Thus, he furthered his education in St Petersburg before embarking upon the Second Kamchatka Expedition (1731–42).

== The Second Kamchatka Expedition ==
Krasheninnikov studied plants, animals and minerals, but in addition he developed a strong interest in Siberian history and geography. During the early part of the expedition, he accompanied professor Gmelin on the travel through the Ural Mountains and western Siberia to Yeniseysk. He made numerous observations of natural history, ethnology and linguistics, e.g. records of Evenki (tungus) and Buryat vocabulary. From Bering’s headquarters at Yakutsk, the expedition professors Gmelin and Gerhard Friedrich Müller sent Krasheninnikov ahead to Okhotsk and Kamchatka to build house and make preliminary observations. Thus, he became the member of the expedition with the most extensive knowledge of the peninsula. He published his observations in 1755 ("Описание земли Камчатки"; English translation by James Grieve (1764) as History of Kamtschatka). It is claimed that he drew extensively on the manuscripts of the deceased Georg Wilhelm Steller, but it is also argued that "it was in fact Steller who used the materials which Krasheninnikov gave him in Kamchatka, and the completed sections which later went into Krasheninnikov's book". Apart from detailed accounts of the plants and animals of the region, there also were reports on the language and culture of the indigenous Itelmen and Koryak peoples, with whom he is said to have got along extremely well.

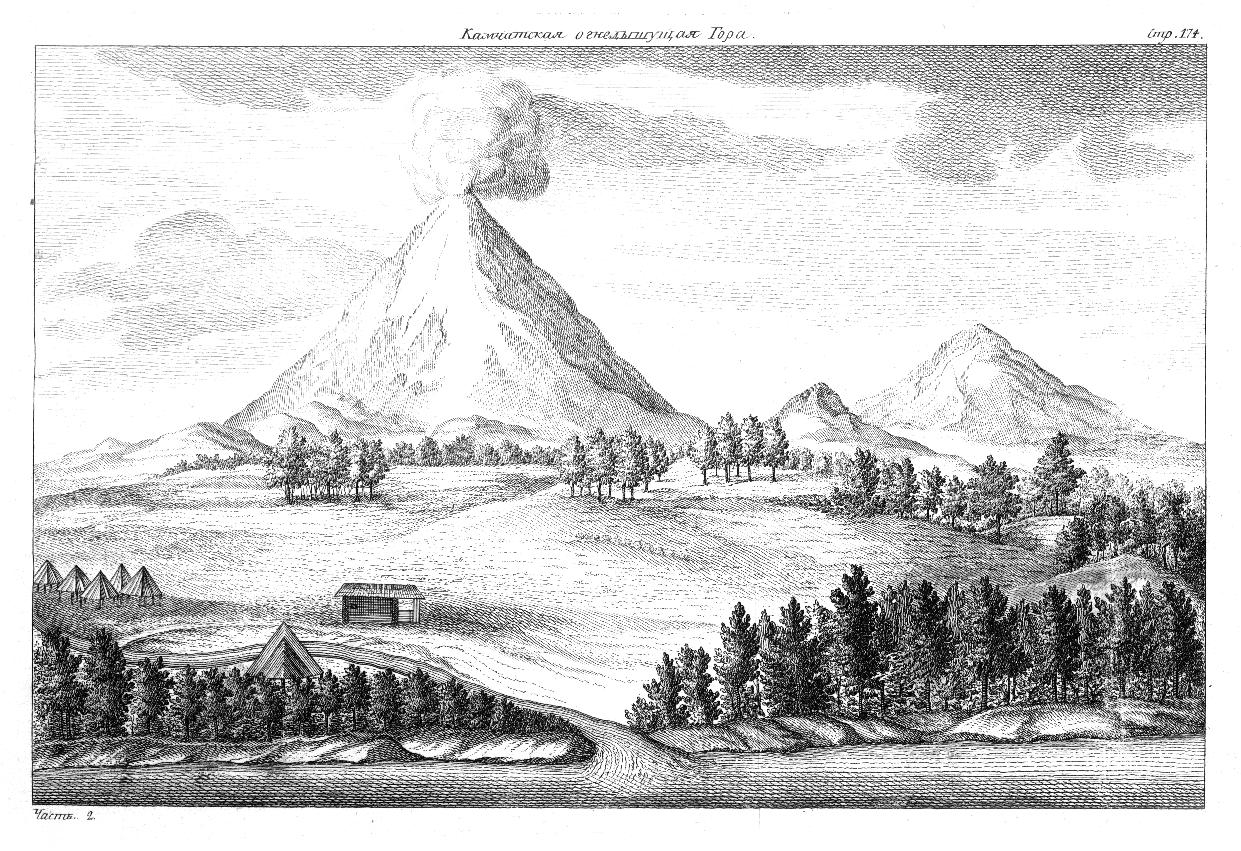
"Volcanoes on Kamtchatka. From: Описание земли Камчатки, St Petersburg 1755."

== Later life ==
Krasheninnikov spent ten years on the Second Kamchatka Expedition. On his return to St Petersburg, he wrote and defended his doctoral thesis on ichthyology in 1745. He was appointed adjunct at the Academy of Sciences, and later head of the Academy's Botanic Garden and professor of natural history at the university. He was one of only 26 Russians to become Academy members in the 18th century. In 1752, Krasheninnikov went on his last expedition to the tracts of Lake Ladoga and Novgorod to investigate the flora. He died before being able to publish his observations, which instead were published by David de Gorter.

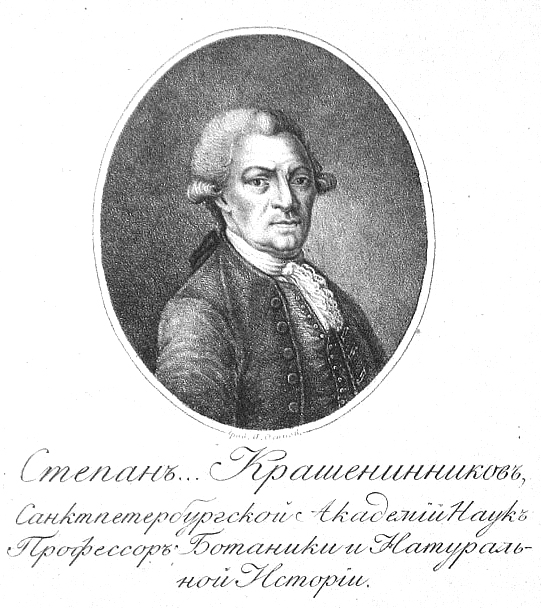

== Plant species named for S. P. Krasheninnikov ==
More than 20 species have been named in his honour, e.g.

- The sedge species Carex krascheninnikovii Komarov ex Hultén, which was collected by V. L. Komarov in 1909 on the same hillock that Krasheninnikov had found it on during the Second Kamchatka Expedition.
- The genus Krascheninnikovia Gueldenst. (Chenopodiaceae)

== See also ==
- Description of the Land of Kamchatka (Krasheninnikov)
