= Russian colonization of North America =

Russian America Русская Америка Russkaya Amerika
- Colony of the Russian Empire
- 1732–1867
- Flag (1806–1867) Coat of arms

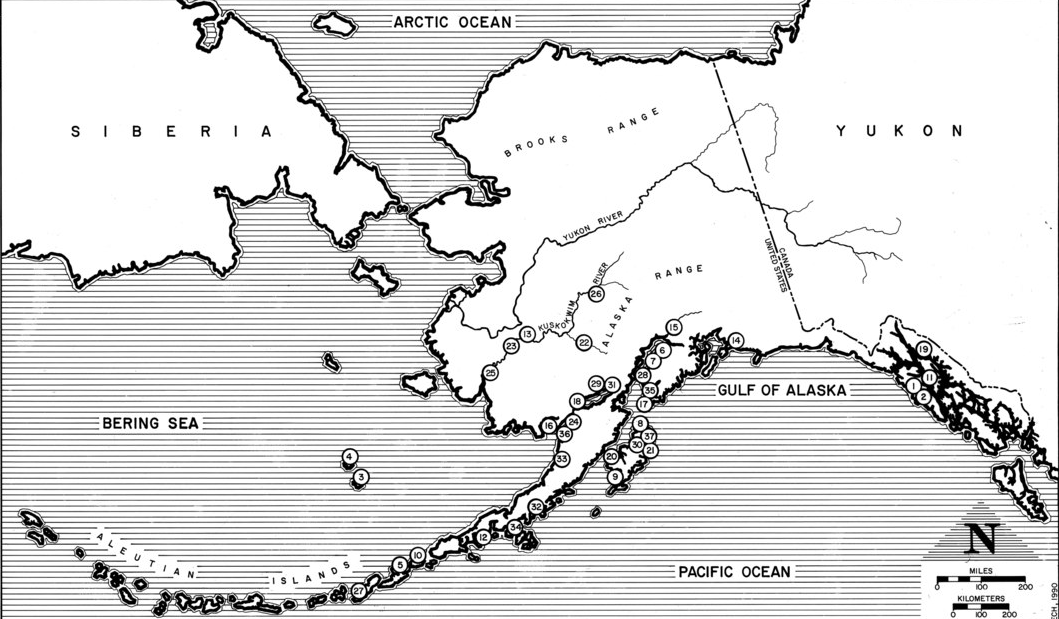
- Russian Creole settlements
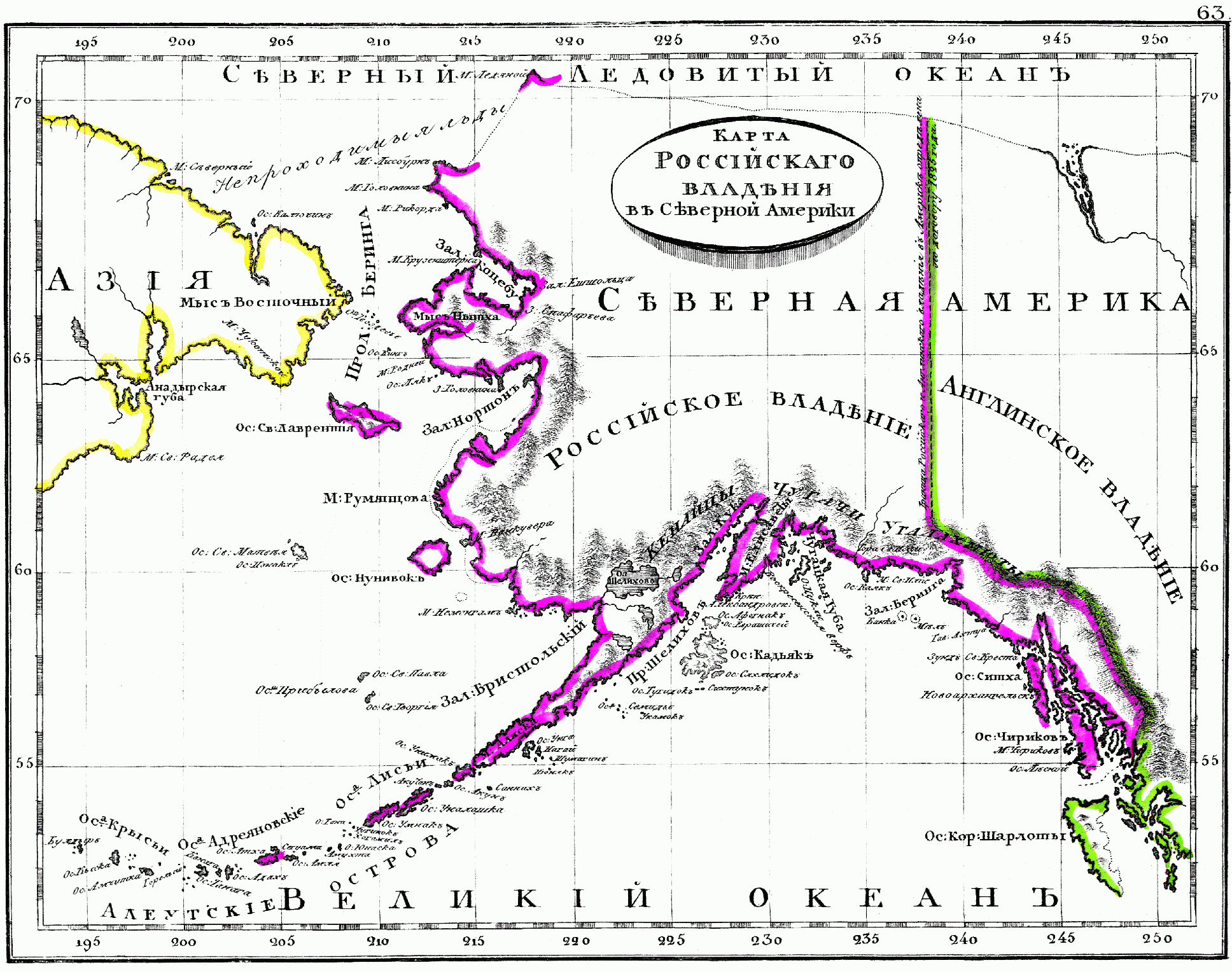
- Russian possessions in North America (1835)

Anthem
- "Боже, Царя храни!" Bozhe Tsarya khrani! (1833–1867) ("God Save the Tsar!")
- Capital: Kodiak (1799–1804); Novo-Arkhangelsk
- Demonym: Alaskan Creole
- Government
  - Type: Absolute monarchy
- Governor
  - 1799–1818 (first): Alexander Baranov
  - 1863–1867 (last): Dmitry Maksutov
- History
  - Great Northern Expedition: July 15 1732
  - Alaska Purchase: October 18 1867
Preceded by	Succeeded by
Alaska Natives	Department of Alaska
- Today part of: United States: Alaska

Russian colonization of North America describes colonies and territories claimed by the Russian Empire in the Pacific Coast region of North America from 1732 to 1867. Russian colonial possessions in the Americas were collectively known as Russian America from 1799 to 1867.

Russian America consisted mostly of present-day Alaska in the United States, but also included the outpost of Fort Ross in California. Russian Creole settlements were concentrated in Alaska, including the capital, New Archangel (Novo-Arkhangelsk), which is now Sitka.

Russian expansion eastward began in 1552 with the Russo-Kazan wars and Russian explorers reached the Pacific Ocean in 1639. In 1725, Emperor Peter the Great ordered navigator Vitus Bering to explore the North Pacific for potential colonization. The Russians were primarily interested in the abundance of fur-bearing mammals on Alaska's coast, as stocks had been depleted by over hunting in the Siberian fur trade. Bering's first voyage was foiled by thick fog and ice, but in 1741 a second voyage by Bering and Aleksei Chirikov discovered part of the North American mainland. Bering claimed the Alaskan country for the Russian Empire. Russia later confirmed its rule over the territory with the Ukase of 1799 which established the southern border of Russian America along the 55th parallel north. The decree also provided monopolistic privileges to the state-sponsored Russian-American Company (RAC) and established the Russian Orthodox Church in Alaska.

Russian promyshlenniki (trappers and hunters) quickly developed the maritime fur trade, which instigated several conflicts between the Aleuts and Russians in the 1760s. The fur trade proved to be a lucrative enterprise, capturing the attention of other European nations. In response to potential competitors, the Russians extended their claims eastward from the Commander Islands to the shores of Alaska. In 1784, with encouragement from Empress Catherine the Great, explorer Grigory Shelekhov founded Russia's first permanent settlement in Alaska at Three Saints Bay. Ten years later, the first group of Orthodox Christian missionaries arrived, evangelizing thousands of Native Americans, many of whose descendants continue to maintain the religion. By the late 1780s, trade relations had opened with the Tlingits, and in 1799 the RAC was formed to monopolize the fur trade, also serving as an imperialist vehicle for the Russification of Alaska Natives.

Angered by encroachment on their land and other grievances, the indigenous peoples' relations with the Russians deteriorated. In 1802, Tlingit warriors destroyed several Russian settlements, most notably Redoubt Saint Michael (Old Sitka), leaving New Russia as the only remaining outpost on mainland Alaska. This failed to expel the Russians, who re-established their presence two years later following the Battle of Sitka. Peace negotiations between the Russians and Native Americans would later establish a modus vivendi, a situation that, with few interruptions, lasted for the duration of Russian presence in Alaska. In 1808, Redoubt Saint Michael was rebuilt as New Archangel and became the capital of Russian America after the previous colonial headquarters were moved from Kodiak. A year later, the RAC began expanding its operations to more abundant sea otter grounds in Northern California, where Fort Ross was built in 1812.

By the middle of the 19th century, profits from Russia's North American colonies were in steep decline. Competition with the British Hudson's Bay Company had brought the sea otter to near extinction, while the population of bears, wolves, and foxes on land was also nearing depletion. Faced with the reality of periodic Native American revolts, the political ramifications of the Crimean War, and the inability to fully colonize the Americas to their satisfaction, the Russians concluded that their North American colonies were too expensive to retain. Eager to release themselves of the burden, the Russians sold Fort Ross in 1841, and in 1867, after less than a month of negotiations, the United States accepted Emperor Alexander II's offer to sell Alaska. The Alaska Purchase for $7.2 million (equivalent to $166 million in 2025) ended Imperial Russia's colonial presence in the Americas.

== Exploration ==
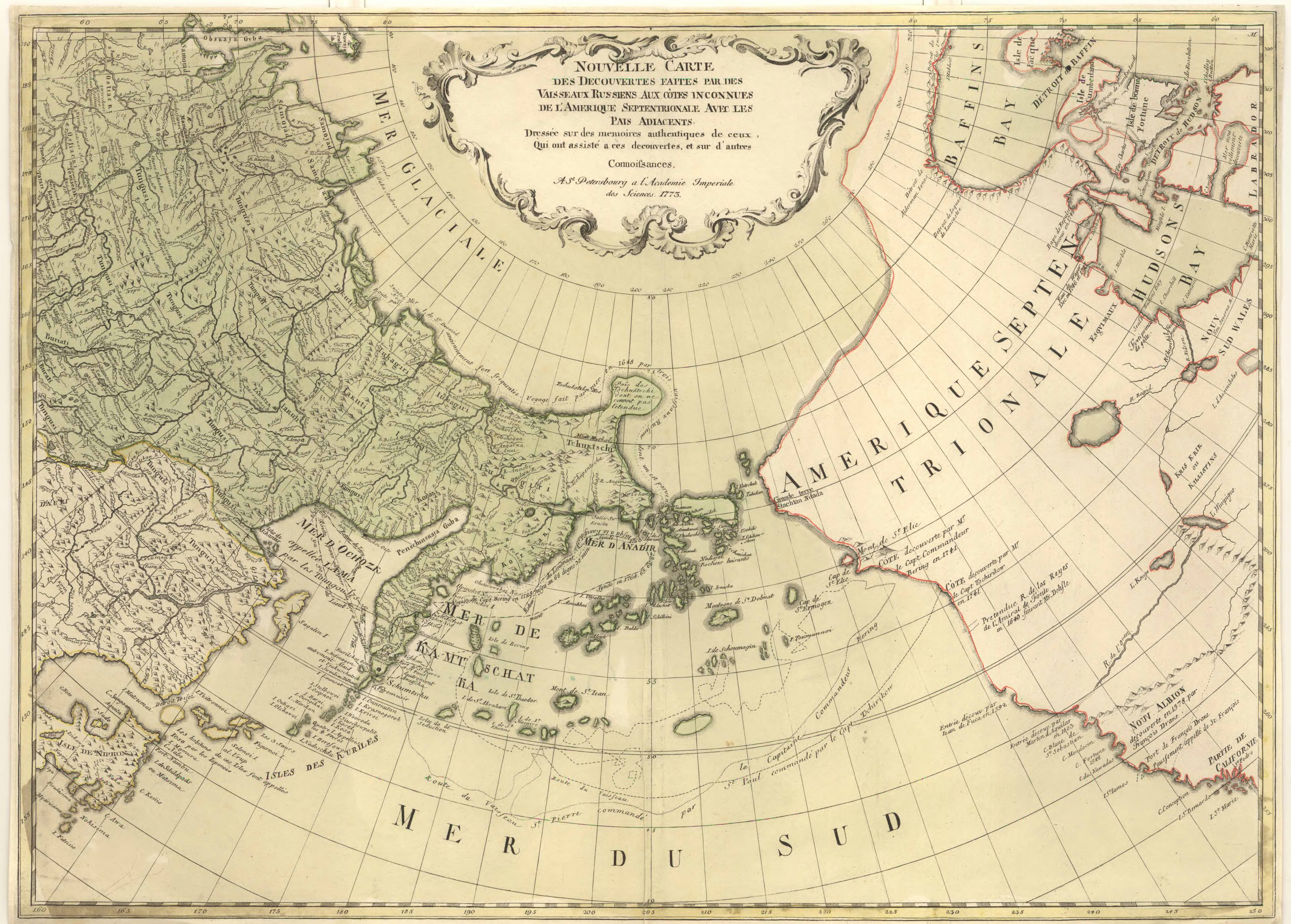
A 1773 map of northwestern America based on reports from Russian explorers.

The earliest written accounts indicate that the Eurasian Russians were the first Europeans to reach Alaska. There is an unofficial assumption that Eurasian Slavic navigators reached the coast of Alaska long before the 18th century.

In 1648, Semyon Dezhnev sailed from the mouth of the Kolyma River through the Arctic Ocean and around the eastern tip of Asia to the Anadyr River. One legend holds that some of his boats were carried off course and reached Alaska. However, no evidence of settlement survives. Dezhnev's discovery was never forwarded to the central government, leaving open the question of whether or not Siberia was connected to North America.

The first sighting of the Alaskan coastline was in 1732; this sighting was made by the Russian maritime explorer and navigator Ivan Fedorov from the sea near present-day Cape Prince of Wales on the eastern boundary of the Bering Strait opposite Russian Cape Dezhnev. He did not land.

The first landfall happened in southern Alaska in 1741 during the Russian exploration by Vitus Bering and Aleksei Chirikov. In the early 1720s, Tsar Peter the Great called for another expedition. As a part of the 1733–1743 Second Kamchatka expedition, the Sv. Petr under the Danish-born Russian Vitus Bering and the Sv. Pavel under the Russian Alexei Chirikov set sail from the Kamchatkan port of Petropavlovsk in June 1741. They were soon separated, but each continued sailing east. On July 15, Chirikov sighted land, probably the west side of Prince of Wales Island in southeast Alaska. He sent a group of men ashore in a longboat, making them the first Europeans to land on the northwestern coast of North America. On roughly July 16, Bering and the crew of Sv. Petr sighted Mount Saint Elias on the Alaskan mainland; they turned westward toward Russia soon afterward. Meanwhile, Chirikov and the Sv. Pavel headed back to Russia in October with news of the land they had found. In November, Bering's ship was wrecked on Bering Island. There Bering fell ill and died, and high winds dashed the Sv. Petr to pieces. After the stranded crew wintered on the island, the survivors built a boat from the wreckage and set sail for Russia in August 1742. Bering's crew reached the shore of Kamchatka in 1742, carrying word of the expedition. The high quality of the sea otter pelts they brought sparked Russian settlement in Alaska.

Due to the distance from central authority in St. Petersburg, and combined with the difficult geography and lack of adequate resources, the next state-sponsored expedition would wait more than two decades until 1766, when captains Pyotr Krenitsyn and Mikhail Levashov embarked for the Aleutian Islands, eventually reaching their destination after initially been wrecked on Bering Island. Between 1774 and 1800 Spain also led several expeditions to Alaska to assert its claim over the Pacific Northwest. These claims were later abandoned at the turn of the 19th century following the aftermath of the Nootka Crisis. Count Nikolay Rumyantsev funded Russia's first naval circumnavigation under the joint command of Adam Johann von Krusenstern and Nikolai Rezanov in 1803–1806, and was instrumental in the outfitting of the voyage of the Riurik's circumnavigation of 1814–1816, which provided substantial scientific information on Alaska's and California's flora and fauna, and important ethnographic information on Alaskan and Californian (among other) natives.

== Trading company ==
Imperial Russia was unique among European empires for having no state sponsorship of foreign expeditions or territorial settlement. The first state-protected trading company for sponsoring such activities in the Americas was the Shelikhov-Golikov Company of Grigory Shelikhov and Ivan Larionovich Golikov. A number of other companies were operating in Russian America during the 1780s. Shelikhov petitioned the government for exclusive control, but in 1788 Catherine II decided to grant his company a monopoly only over the area it had already occupied. Other traders were free to compete elsewhere. Catherine's decision was issued as the imperial ukase (proclamation) of September 28, 1788.

The Shelikhov-Golikov Company formed the basis for the Russian-American Company (RAC). Its charter was laid out in 1799 by the new Tsar Paul I, which granted the company monopolistic control over trade in the Aleutian Islands and the North American mainland, south to 55° north latitude. The RAC was Russia's first joint stock company, and came under the direct authority of the Ministry of Commerce of Imperial Russia. Siberian merchants based in Irkutsk were initially the major stockholders, but were soon replaced by Russia's nobility and aristocracy based in Saint Petersburg. The company constructed settlements in what is today Alaska, Hawaii, and California.

== Russian colonization ==
=== 1740s to 1800 ===
Beginning in 1743, small associations of fur-traders began to sail from the shores of the Russian Pacific coast to the Aleutian islands.

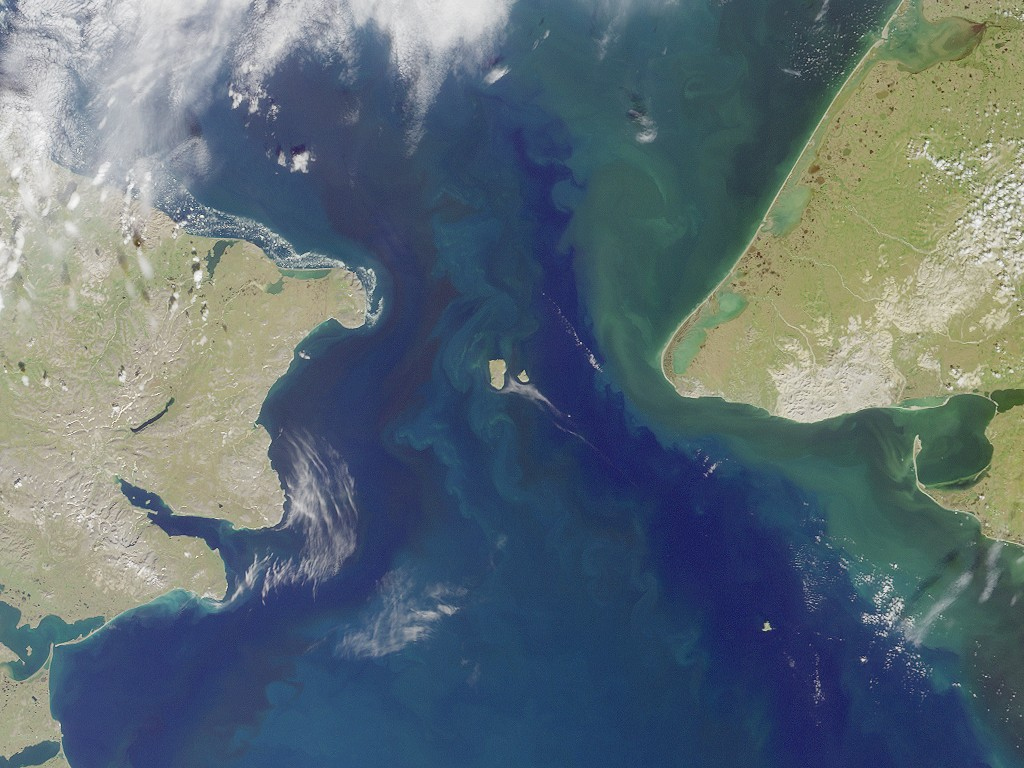
The Bering Strait, where Russia's east coast lies closest to Alaska's west coast. Early Russian colonization occurred well south of the strait, in the Aleutian Islands.

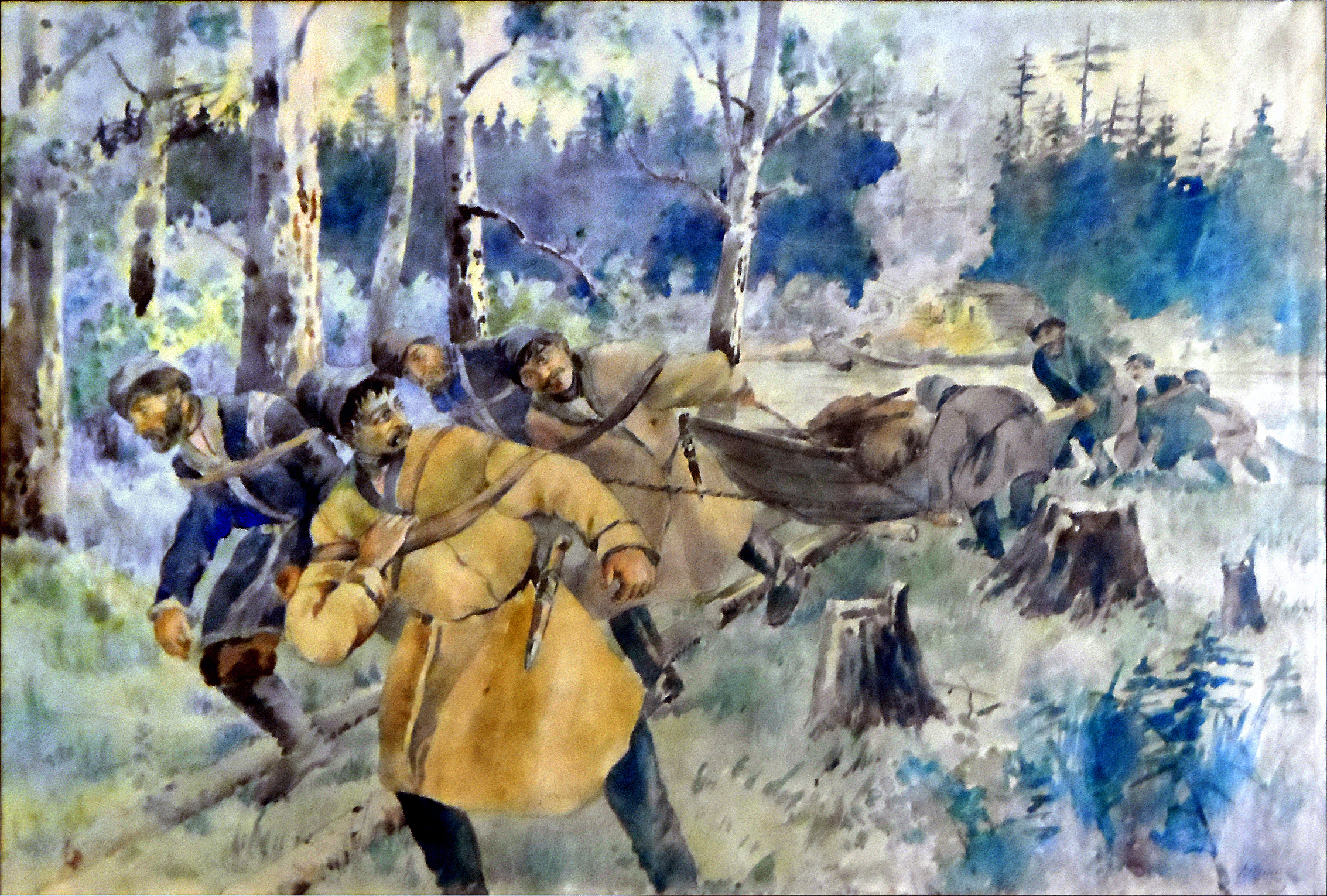
Sibero-Russian promyshlenniki (hunter-trapper frontiersmen)

Rather than hunting the marine life themselves, the Sibero-Russian promyshlenniki forced the Aleuts to do the work for them, often by taking hostage family members in exchange for hunted seal furs. This pattern of colonial exploitation resembled some of the promyshlenniki practices in their expansion into Siberia and the Russian Far East. As word spread of the potential riches in furs, competition among Russian companies increased and a large number of Aleuts were enserfed.

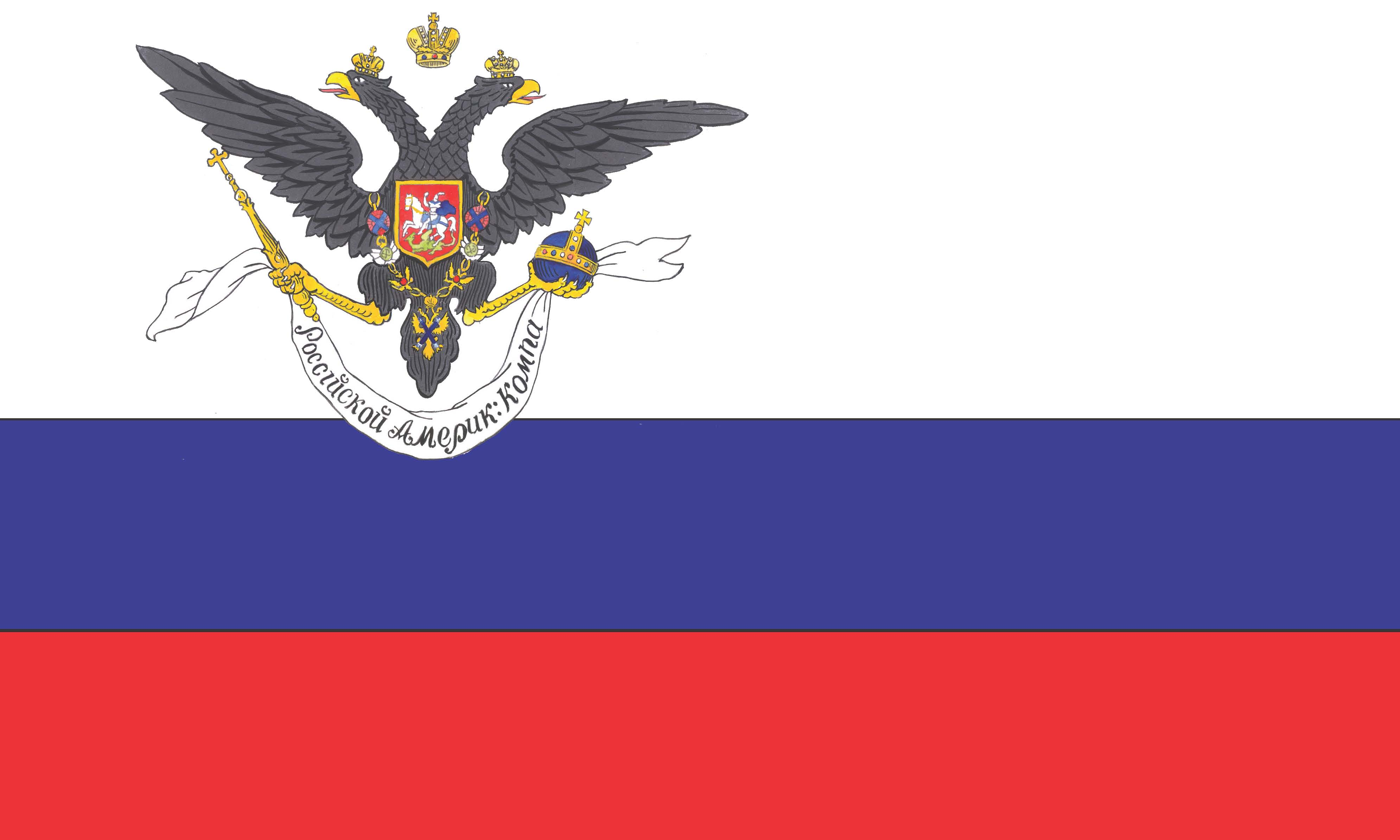
Flag of the Russian-American Company (1806–1881).

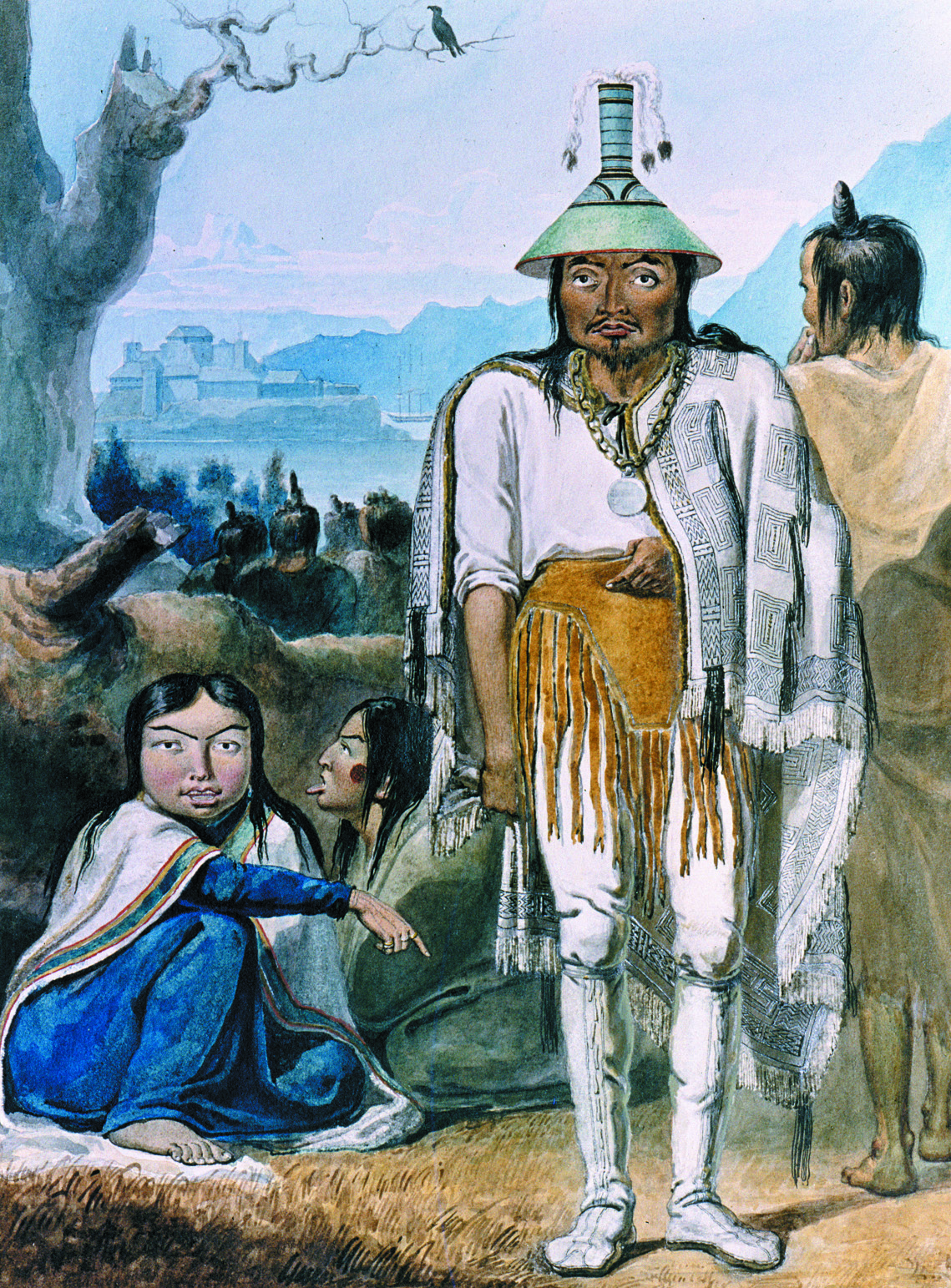
Tlingit Chieftain of Sitka

As the animal populations declined, the Aleuts, already too dependent on the new barter economy fostered by the Russian fur trade, were increasingly coerced into taking greater and greater risks in the highly dangerous waters of the North Pacific to hunt for more otter. As the Shelekhov-Golikov Company of 1783–1799 developed a monopoly, its use of skirmishes and violent incidents turned into systematic violence as a tool of colonial exploitation of the indigenous people. When the Aleutian serfs revolted and won some victories, the promyshlenniki retaliated, killing many and destroying their boats and hunting gear, leaving them no means of survival. The most devastating effects came from disease: during the first two generations (1741–1759 & 1781–1799) of Sibero-Russian promyshlenniki contact, 80 percent of the Aleut population died from Eurasian infectious diseases; these were by then endemic among Eurasians, but the Aleuts had no immunity against the diseases.

Though the Alaskan colony was never very profitable because of the costs of transportation, most Russian traders were determined to keep the land for themselves. In 1784, Grigory Ivanovich Shelekhov, who later set up the Russian-American Company that developed into the Alaskan colonial administration, arrived in Three Saints Bay on Kodiak Island with two ships, the Three Saints (Russian: Три Святителя) and the St. Simon. The Koniag Alaska Natives harassed the Russian party and Shelekhov responded by killing hundreds and taking hostages to enforce the obedience of the rest. Having established his authority on Kodiak Island, Shelekhov founded the second permanent Russian settlement in Alaska (after Unalaska, permanently settled in 1774) on the island's Three Saints Bay.

In 1790, Shelekhov, back in Russia, hired Alexander Andreyevich Baranov to manage his Alaskan fur enterprise. Baranov moved the colony to the northeast end of Kodiak Island, where timber was available. The site later developed into what is now the city of Kodiak. Russian colonists took Koniag's wives and started families whose surnames continue today, such as Panamaroff, Petrikoff, and Kvasnikoff. In 1795 Baranov, concerned by the sight of non-Russian Europeans trading with the natives in southeast Alaska, established Mikhailovsk six miles (9.7 km) north of present-day Sitka. He bought the land from the Tlingit, but in 1802, while Baranov was away, Tlingit from a neighboring settlement attacked and destroyed Mikhailovsk. Baranov returned with a Russian warship and razed the Tlingit village. He built the settlement of New Archangel (Russian: Ново-Архангельск, romanized: Novo-Arkhangelsk) on the ruins of Mikhailovsk. It became the capital of Russian America – and later the city of Sitka.

As Baranov secured the Russians' settlements in Alaska, the Shelekhov family continued to lobby Empress Catherine the Great for a monopoly on Alaska's fur trade. In 1799 Shelekhov's son-in-law, Nikolay Petrovich Rezanov, succeeded when he acquired a monopoly on the American fur trade from Emperor Paul I. Rezanov formed the Russian-American Company. As part of the deal, the Emperor expected the company to establish new settlements in Alaska. Thus, while the company was focused on its commercial enterprise, it also effectively became an outpost for the Russian Empire in North America.

=== 1800 to 1867 ===
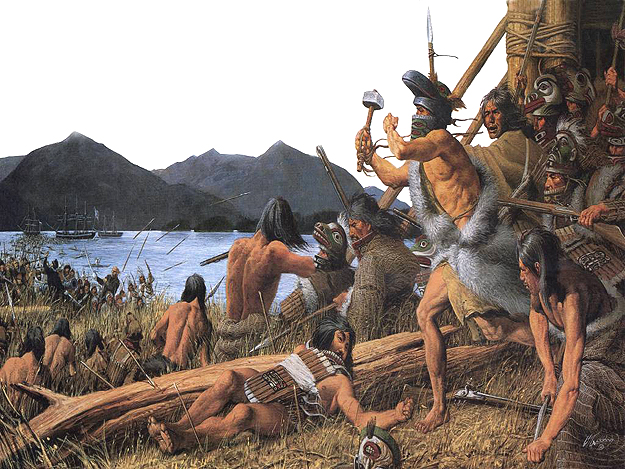
Aleutian & Russian allied forces defeat the Tlingit tribe at the Battle of Sitka, 1804.

By 1804, Baranov, now manager of the Russian–American Company, had consolidated the company's hold on fur trade activities in the Americas following his suppression of the Tlingit clan at the Battle of Sitka. The Russians never fully colonized Alaska. For the most part, they clung to the coast and shunned the interior.

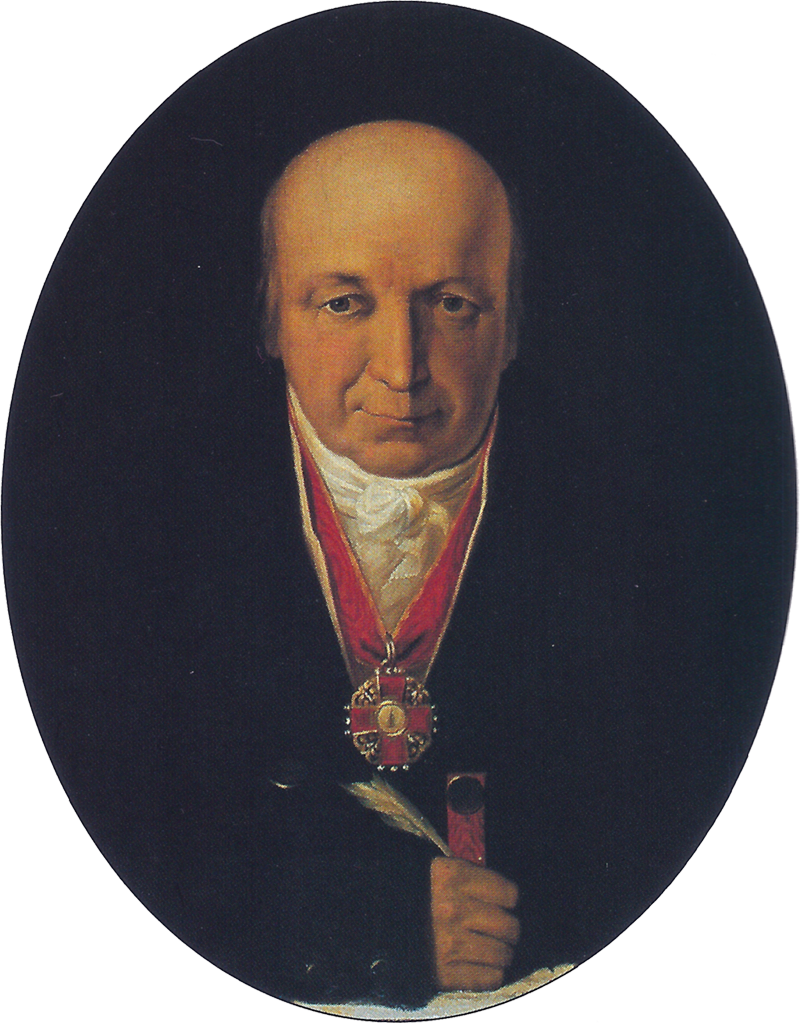
Alexander Andreyevich Baranov, called "Lord of Alaska" by Hector Chevigny, played an active role in the Russian–American Company and was the first governor of Russian America.

From 1812 to 1841, the Russians operated Fort Ross, California. From 1814 to 1817, Russian Fort Elizabeth was operating in the Kingdom of Hawaii. By the 1830s, the Russian monopoly on trade was weakening. The British Hudson's Bay Company was leased the southern edge of Russian America in 1839 under the RAC-HBC Agreement, establishing Fort Stikine which began siphoning off trade.

A company ship visited the Russian American outposts only every two or three years to give provisions. Because of the limited stock of supplies, trading was incidental compared to trapping operations under the Aleutian laborers. This left the Russian outposts dependent upon British and American merchants for sorely needed food and materials; in such a situation Baranov knew that the RAC establishments "could not exist without trading with foreigners." Ties with Americans were particularly advantageous since they could sell furs at Guangzhou, close to the Russians at the time. The downside was that American hunters and trappers encroached on territory Russians considered theirs.

Starting with the destruction of the Phoenix in 1799, several RAC ships sank or were damaged in storms, leaving the RAC outposts with scant resources. On June 24, 1800, an American vessel sailed to Kodiak Island. Baranov negotiated the sale of over 12,000 rubles worth of goods carried on the ship, averting "imminent starvation." During his tenure, Baranov traded over 2 million rubles worth of furs for American supplies, to the consternation of the board of directors. From 1806 to 1818 Baranov shipped 15 million rubles worth of furs to Russia, only receiving under 3 million rubles in provisions, barely half of the expenses spent solely on the Saint Petersburg company office.

The Russo-American Treaty of 1824 recognized exclusive Russian rights to the fur trade north of latitude 54°40'N, with the American rights and claims restricted to below that line. This division was repeated in the Treaty of Saint Petersburg, a parallel agreement with the British in 1825 (which also settled most of the border with British North America). However, the agreements soon went by the wayside, and with the retirement of Alexandr Baranov in 1818, the Russian hold on Alaska was further weakened.

When the Russian-American Company's charter was renewed in 1821, it stipulated that the chief managers from then on be naval officers. Most naval officers did not have any experience in the fur trade, so the company suffered. The second charter also tried to cut off all contact with foreigners, especially the competitive Americans. This strategy backfired since the Russian colony had become used to relying on American supply ships, and the United States had become a valued customer for furs. Eventually the Russian–American Company agreed with the Hudson's Bay Company, which gave the British rights to sail through Russian territory.

== Colonies ==
The first Russian colony in Alaska was founded in 1784 by Grigory Shelikhov. Subsequently, Russian explorers and settlers continued to establish trading posts in mainland Alaska, on the Aleutian Islands, Hawaii, and Northern California.

=== Alaska ===
The Russian-American Company was formed in 1799 with the influence of Nikolay Rezanov to hunt sea otters for their fur. The peak population of the Russian colonies was about 4,000 although almost all of these were Aleuts, Tlingits and other Native Alaskans. The number of Russians rarely exceeded 500 at any one time.

=== California ===
The Russians established an outpost called Fortress Ross (Russian: Крѣпость Россъ, Krepost' Ross) in 1812 near Bodega Bay in Northern California, north of San Francisco Bay. The Fort Ross colony included a sealing station on the Farallon Islands off San Francisco. By 1818 Fort Ross had a population of 128, consisting of 26 Russians and 102 Native Americans. The Russians maintained it until 1841 when they left the region. As of 2015, Fort Ross is a Federal National Historical Landmark on the National Register of Historic Places. It is preserved—restored in California's Fort Ross State Historic Park, about 80 miles (130 km) northwest of San Francisco.

Spanish concern about Russian colonial intrusion prompted the authorities in New Spain to initiate the upper Las Californias Province settlement, with presidios (forts), pueblos (villages), and the California missions. After declaring their independence in 1821, the Mexicans also asserted themselves in opposition to the Russians: the Mission San Francisco de Solano (Sonoma Mission, 1823) specifically responded to the presence of the Russians at Fort Ross; and Mexico established the El Presidio Real de Sonoma or Sonoma Barracks in 1836, with General Mariano Guadalupe Vallejo as the Commandant of the Northern Frontier of the Alta California Province.

== Missionary activity ==
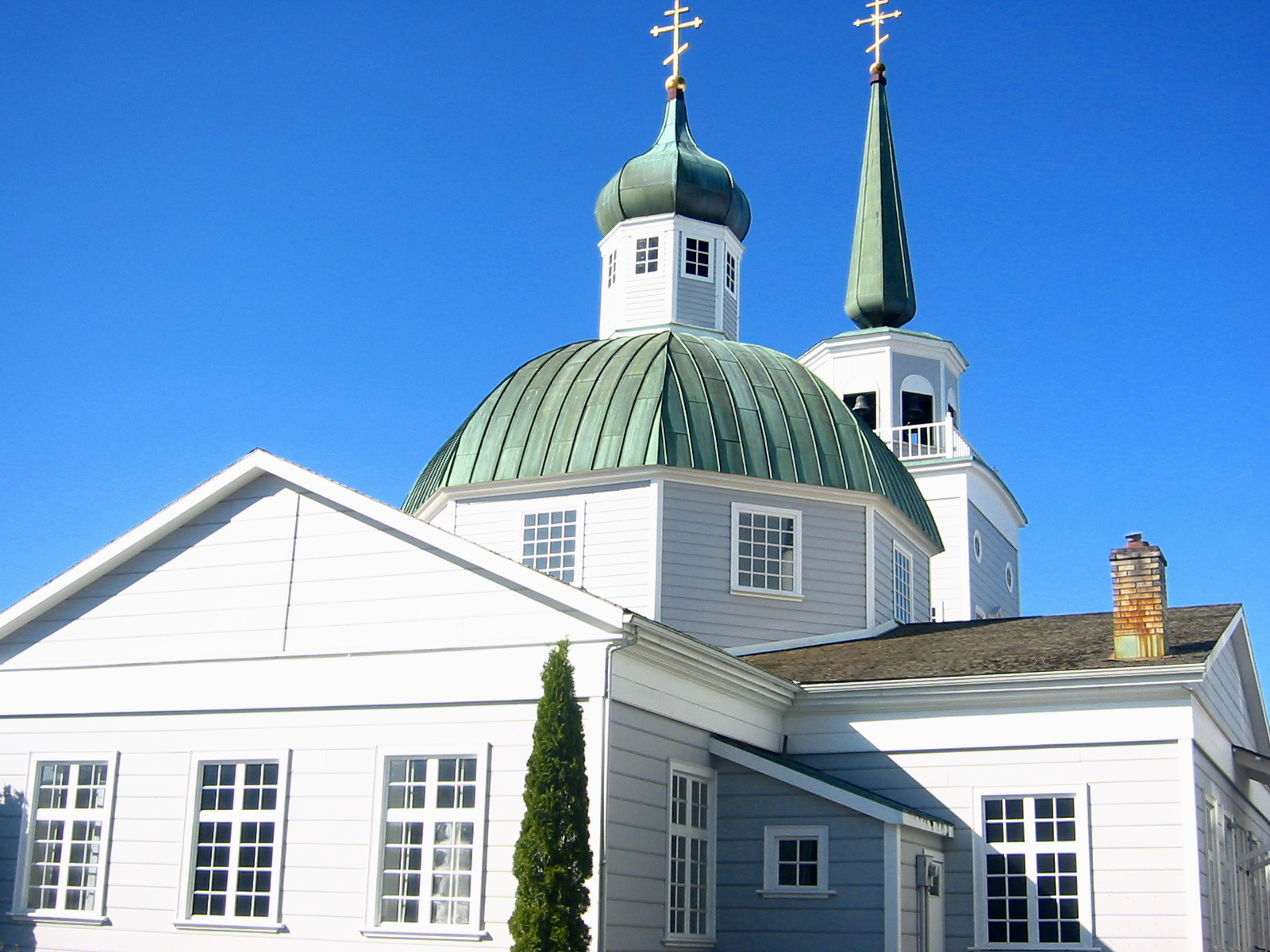
Russian Orthodox cathedral, in present-day Sitka

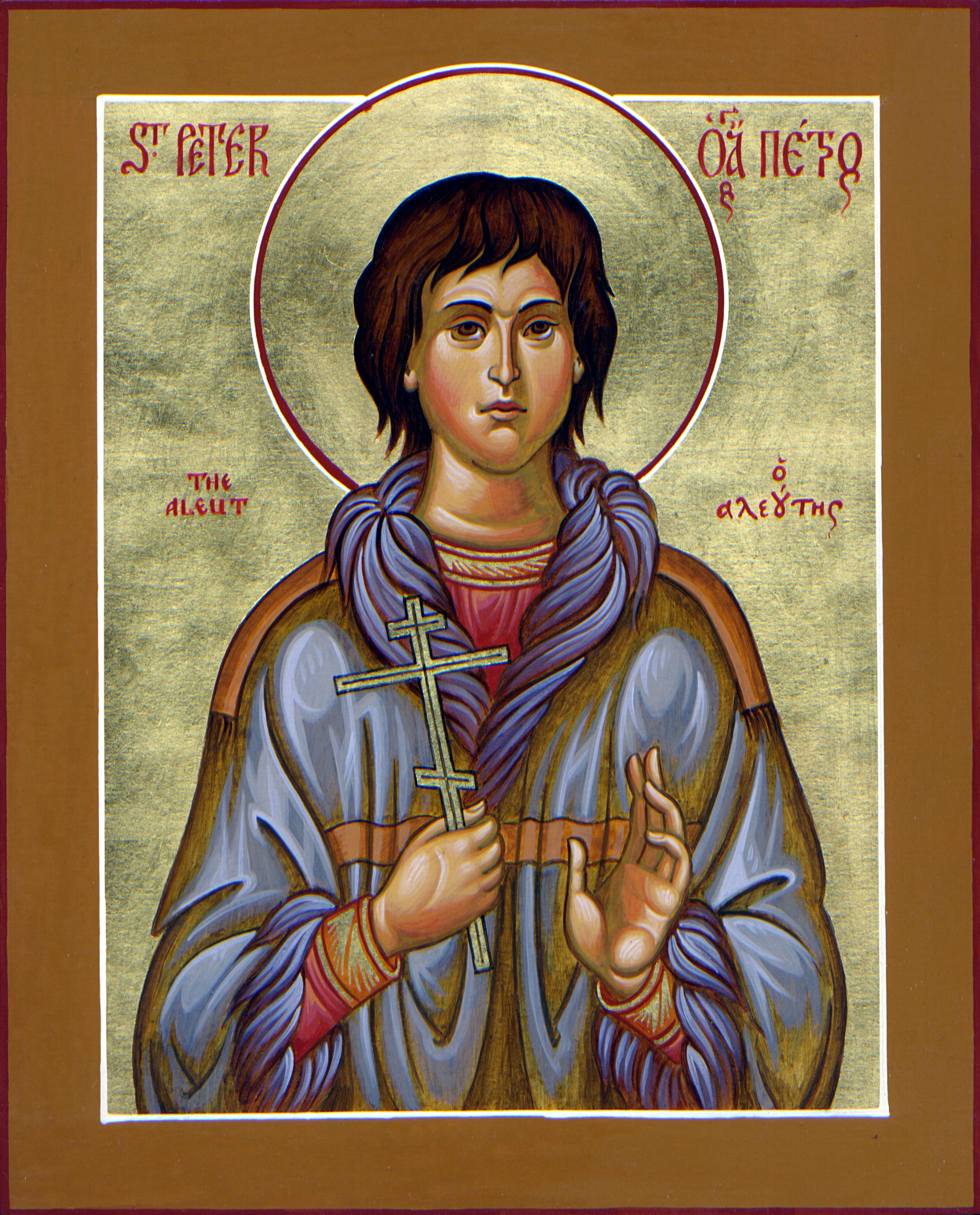
St. Peter the Aleut, a martyred Aleutian Creole

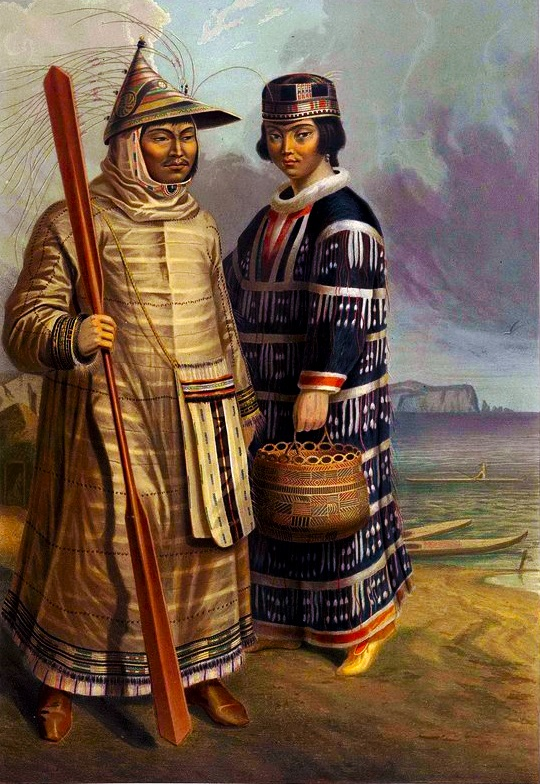
An Aleutian man and woman

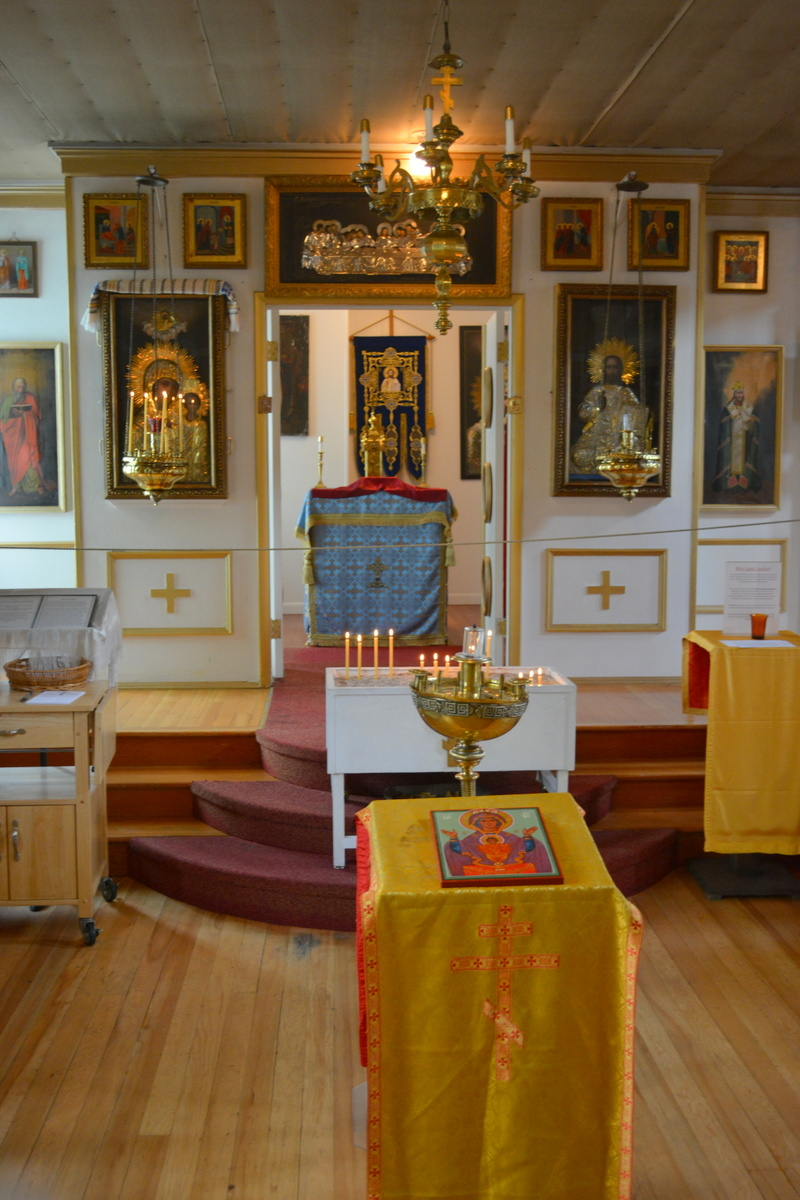
The Sanctuary of St. Michael's Cathedral

At Three Saints Bay, Shelekov built a school to teach the natives to read and write Russian and introduced the first resident missionaries and clergymen who spread the Russian Orthodox faith. This faith (with its liturgies and texts, translated into Aleut at a very early stage) had been informally introduced, in the 1740s–1780s. Some fur traders founded local families or symbolically adopted Aleut trade partners as godchildren to gain their loyalty through this special personal bond. The missionaries soon opposed the exploitation of the indigenous populations, and their reports provide evidence of the violence exercised to establish colonial rule in this period.

The RAC's monopoly was continued by Emperor Alexander I in 1821, on the condition that the company would financially support missionary efforts. The company board ordered chief manager Arvid Adolf Etholén to build a residency in New Archangel for bishop Veniaminov When a Lutheran church was planned for the Finnish population of New Archangel, Veniamiov prohibited any Lutheran pastors from proselytizing to neighboring Tlingits. Veniamiov faced difficulties in exercising influence over the Tlingit people outside New Archangel, due to their political independence from the RAC leaving them less receptive to Russian cultural influences than Aleuts. A smallpox epidemic spread throughout Alaska in 1835–1837 and the medical aid given by Veniamiov created converts to Orthodoxy.

Inspired by the same pastoral theology as Bartolomé de las Casas or St. Francis Xavier, the origins of which were in early Christianity's need to adapt to the cultures of Classical antiquity, missionaries in Russian America applied a strategy that placed value on local cultures and encouraged indigenous leadership in parish life and missionary activity. When compared to later Protestant missionaries, the Orthodox policies "in retrospect proved to be relatively sensitive to indigenous Alaskan cultures." This cultural policy was originally intended to gain the loyalty of the indigenous populations by establishing the authority of Church and State as protectors of over 10,000 inhabitants of Russian America. (The number of ethnic Russian settlers had always been less than the record 812, almost all concentrated in Sitka and Kodiak).

Difficulties arose in training Russian priests to attain fluency in any of the various Indigenous Alaskan languages. To redress this, Veniaminov opened a seminary for mixed-race and native candidates for the Church in 1845. Promising students were sent to additional schools in either Saint Petersburg or Irkutsk, the later city becoming the original seminary's new location in 1858. The Holy Synod instructed for the opening of four missionary schools in 1841, to be located in Amlia, Chiniak, Kenai, and Nushagak. Veniamiov established the curriculum, which included Russian history, literacy, mathematics, and religious studies.

A side effect of the missionary strategy was the development of a new and autonomous form of indigenous identity. Many native traditions survived within local "Russian" Orthodox tradition and in the religious life of the villages. Part of this modern indigenous identity is an alphabet and the basis for written literature in nearly all of the ethnic-linguistic groups in the Southern half of Alaska. Father Ivan Veniaminov (later St. Innocent of Alaska), famous throughout Russian America, developed an Aleut dictionary for hundreds of language and dialect words based on the Russian alphabet.

The most visible trace of the Russian colonial period in contemporary Alaska is the nearly 90 Russian Orthodox parishes with a membership of over 20,000 men, women, and children, almost exclusively indigenous people. These include several Athabascan groups of the interior, very large Yup'ik communities, and quite nearly all of the Aleut and Alutiiq populations. Among the few Tlingit Orthodox parishes, the large group in Juneau adopted Orthodox Christianity only after the Russian colonial period, in an area where there had been no Russian settlers nor missionaries. The widespread and continuing local Russian Orthodox practices are likely the result of the syncretism of local beliefs with Christianity.

Observers noted that while their religious ties were tenuous, before the sale of Alaska there were 400 native converts to Orthodoxy in New Archangel. Tlingit practitioners declined in number after the lapse of Russian rule, until there were only 117 practitioners in 1882 residing in the place, by then renamed as Sitka.

== Purchase of Alaska ==
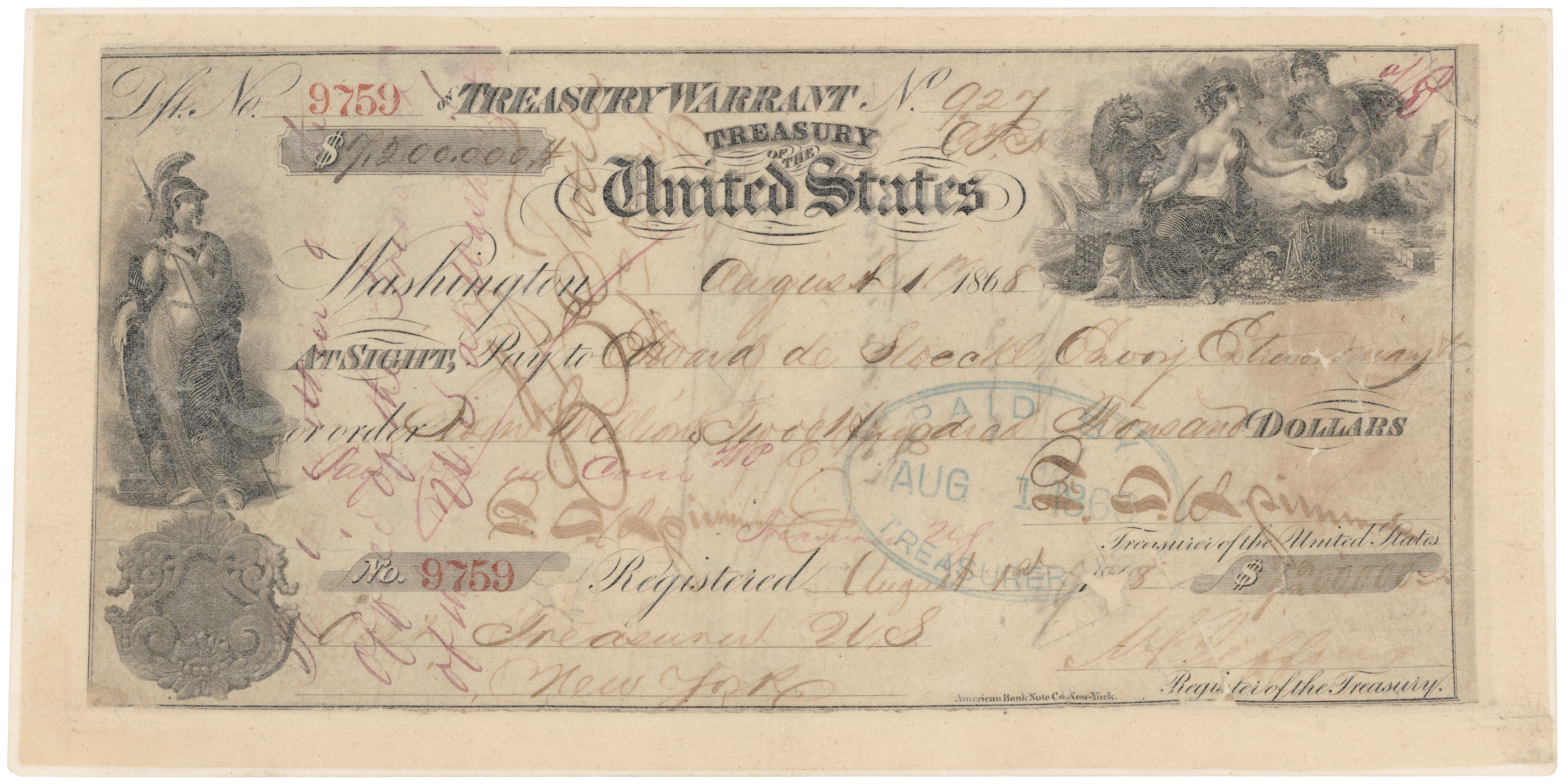
Check used for the purchase of Alaska

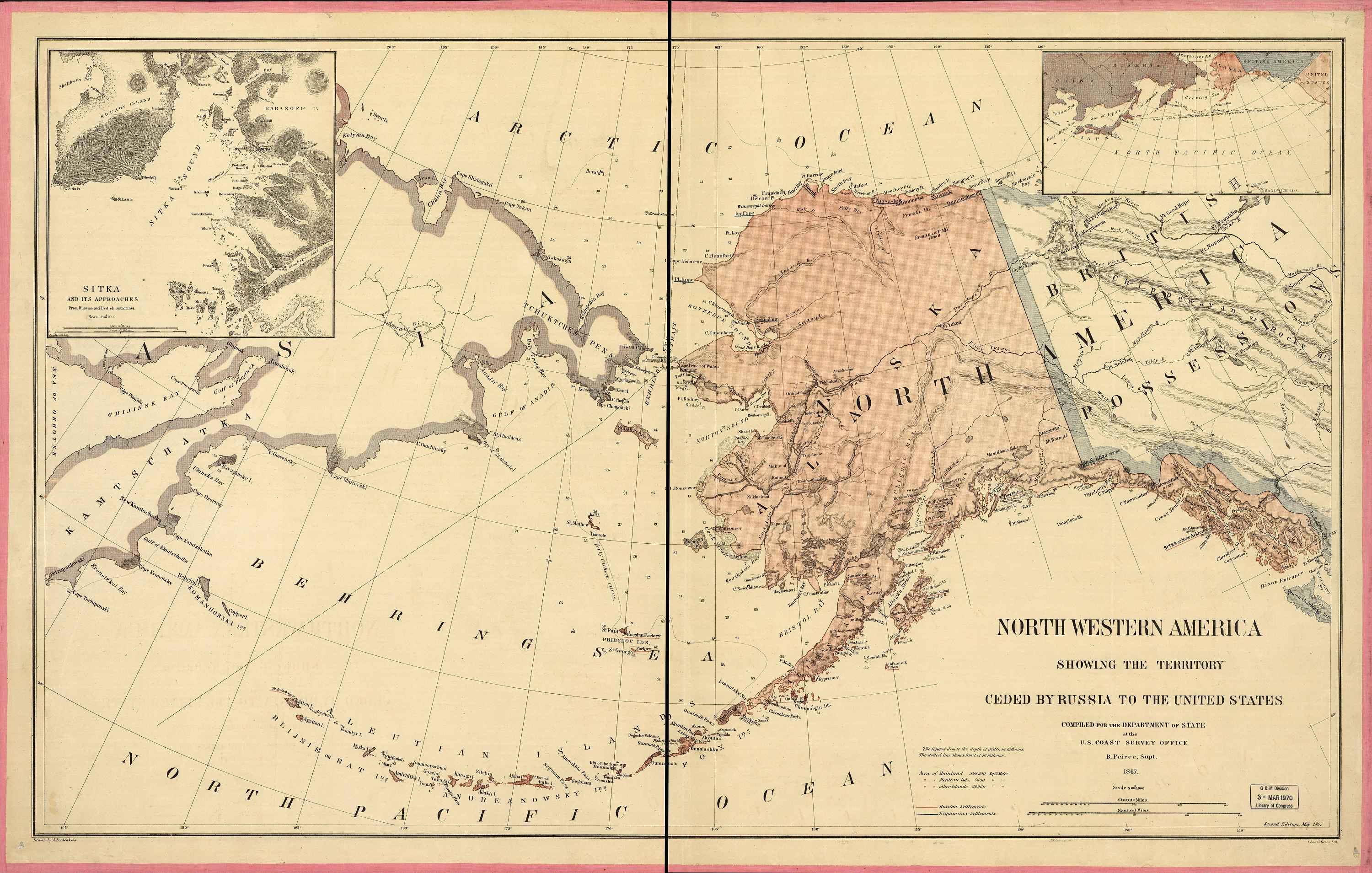
A map depicting the territory of Alaska in 1867, immediately after the Alaska Purchase

By the 1860s, the Russian government was ready to abandon its Russian America colony. Over-hunting had severely reduced the fur-bearing animal population, and competition from the British and Americans exacerbated the situation. This, combined with the difficulties of supplying and protecting such a distant colony, reduced interest in the territory. In addition, Russia was in a difficult financial position after the Crimean War and feared losing Russian Alaska without compensation in some future conflict, especially with the British Empire. The Russians believed that in a dispute with Britain, their hard-to-defend region might become a prime target for British aggression from British Columbia, and would be easily captured. So following the Union victory in the American Civil War, Tsar Alexander II instructed the Russian minister to the United States, Eduard de Stoeckl, to enter into negotiations with the United States Secretary of State William H. Seward in the beginning of March 1867. At the instigation of Seward the United States Senate approved the purchase, known as the Alaska Purchase, from the Russian Empire. The cost was set at 2 cents an acre, which came to a total of $7,200,000 on April 9, 1867. The canceled check is in the present day United States National Archives.

After Russian America was sold to the U.S. in 1867, for $7.2 million (2 cents per acre, equivalent to $165,857,143 in 2025), all the holdings of the Russian–American Company were liquidated.

Following the transfer, many elders of the local Tlingit tribe maintained that "Castle Hill" comprised the only land that Russia was entitled to sell. Other indigenous groups also argued that they had never given up their land; the Americans had encroached on it and taken it over. Native land claims were not fully addressed until the latter half of the 20th century, with the signing by Congress and leaders of the Alaska Native Claims Settlement Act.

At the height of Russian America, the Russian population had reached 700, compared to 40,000 Aleuts. They and the Creoles, who had been guaranteed the privileges of citizens in the United States, were given the opportunity to become citizens within three years, but few decided to exercise that option. General Jefferson C. Davis ordered the Russians out of their homes in Sitka, maintaining that the dwellings were needed for the Americans. The Russians complained of rowdiness and assaults by the American troops. Many Russians returned to Russia, while others migrated to the Pacific Northwest and California.

== Legacy ==
The Soviet Union (USSR) released a series of commemorative coins in 1990 and 1991 to mark the 250th anniversary of the first sighting of and claiming domain over Alaska–Russian America. The commemoration consisted of a silver coin, a platinum coin, and two palladium coins in both years.

The Alaska Native population was first recorded in the 1880 United States census, and it was estimated that the population had declined from 80,000 in 1741 to 33,000 due to disease. The population continued to decline until 1910 and it was not until 1947 that this number surpassed the 1880 figure. The Alaskan Native peoples claimed that they still had title to the territory in that the U.S. bought the right to negotiate with the indigenous populations, rather than buying the territory outright; however, following the enactment of the Alaska Statehood Act, the U.S. government ceded 44 million acres to Alaska’s native populations.

In the early 21st century, Russian officials and pro-Kremlin bloggers have fuelled discussion in Russia, generally facetious, of an ambition to regain control of Alaska. Some Russian ultra-nationalists viewed the sale as an enormous mistake.

== Russian settlements in North America ==
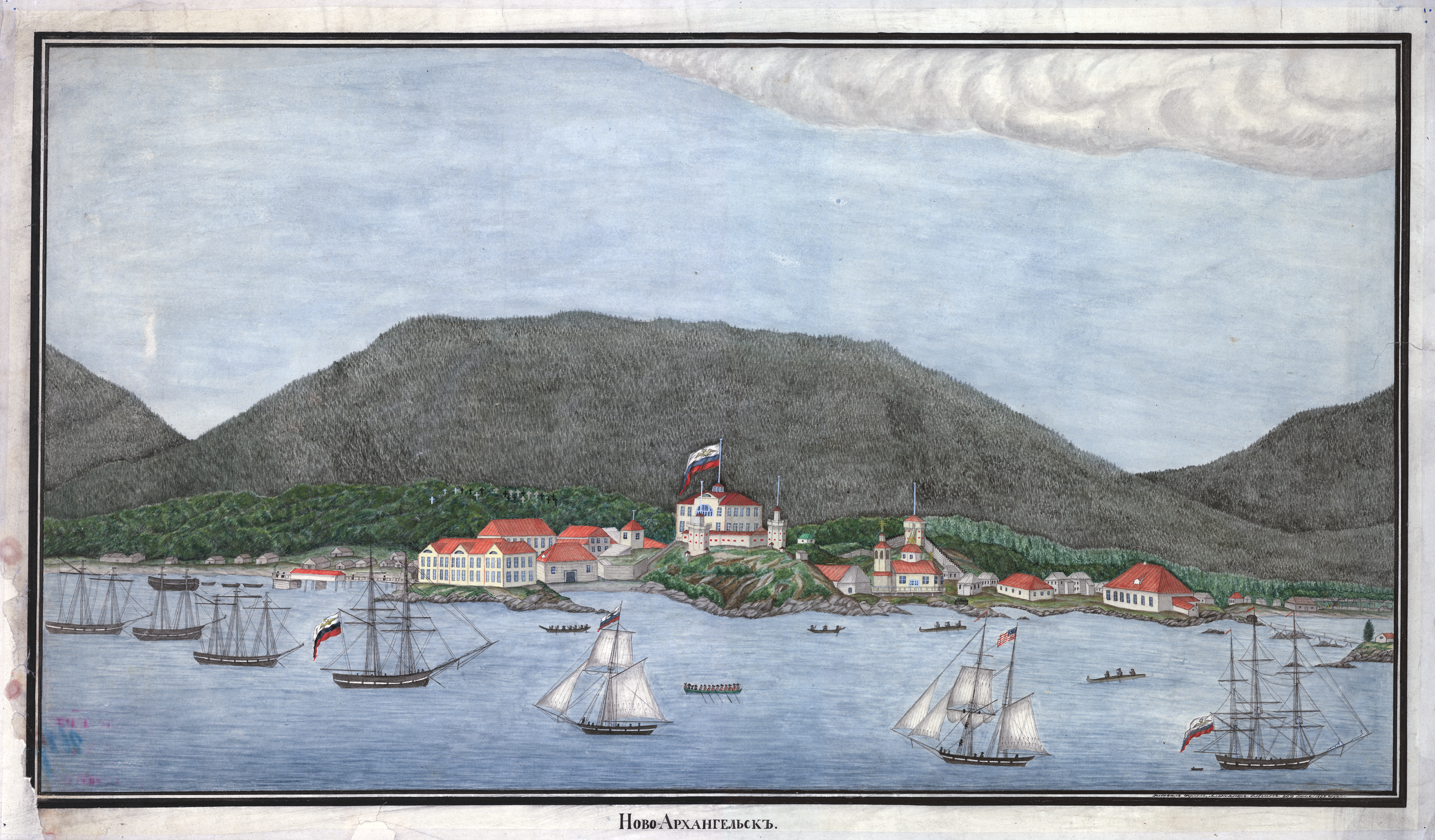
New Archangel (present-day Sitka, Alaska), the capital of Russian America, in 1837

- Unalaska, Alaska – 1774
- Three Saints Bay, Alaska – 1784
- Fort St. George in Kasilof, Alaska – 1786
- St. Paul, Alaska – 1788
- Fort St. Nicholas in Kenai, Alaska – 1791
- Pavlovskaya, Alaska (now Kodiak) – 1791
- Fort Saints Constantine and Helen on Nuchek Island, Alaska – 1793
- Fort on Hinchinbrook Island, Alaska – 1793
- New Russia near present-day Yakutat, Alaska – 1796
- Redoubt St. Archangel Michael, Alaska near Sitka – 1799
- Novo-Arkhangelsk, Alaska (now Sitka) – 1804
- Fort Ross, California – 1812
- Fort Elizabeth near Waimea, Kaua'i, Hawai'i – 1817
- Fort Alexander near Hanalei, Kaua'i, Hawai'i – 1817
- Fort Barclay-de-Tolly near Hanalei, Kaua'i, Hawai'i – 1817
- Fort (New) Alexandrovsk at Bristol Bay, Alaska – 1819
- Kolmakov Redoubt, Alaska – 1832
- Redoubt St. Michael, Alaska – 1833
- Nulato, Alaska – 1834
- Redoubt St. Dionysius in present-day Wrangell, Alaska (now Fort Stikine) – 1834
- Pokrovskaya Mission, Alaska – 1837
- Ninilchik, Alaska – 1847

== See also ==
Native Americans

- Juana Maria
- Peter the Aleut
- Jacob Netsvetov

Russians

- List of Russian explorers
- Herman of Alaska
- Mikhail Tebenkov
- Johan Hampus Furuhjelm
- Nikolai Rezanov
- Vitus Bering

History

- Russian Colonialism
- Territorial evolution of Russia
- Great Northern Expedition
- California Fur Rush
- Awa'uq Massacre
- Russo-American Treaty of 1824
- History of the west coast of North America

Other topics

- Alaska boundary dispute
- Flag of the Russian-American Company
- Alaskan Creole people
- Russian Americans
- Russian–American Telegraph
- Slavic Voice of America
- Ukase of 1821
