= Natalia Shelikhova =

Russian businessperson and wife of Grigory Shelikhov

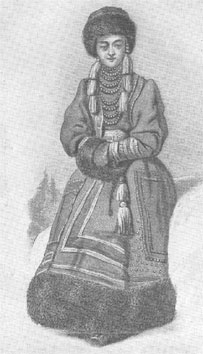
Natalia Alekseevna Shelikhova

Natalia Alekseevna Shelikhova (Russian: Ната́лья Алексе́евна Ше́лихова; 1762–1810), was a Russian businessperson and the wife of Grigory Shelikhov, founder of Russian Alaska. She was one of the founders of the Russian-American Company and has been referred to as one of the first successful female entrepreneurs in Russia.

== Life ==
Natalia Alekseevna Kozhevina was the daughter of a prominent clan of Okhotsk navigators and mapmakers. She had very little education during her childhood. In 1775, Natalia Alekseevna married the fur trader Grigory Shelikhov. They founded the Shelikhov-Golikov Company in 1782.

In the late 1780s, the couple settled in Irkutsk. During the absence of Grigory Shelikhov, he entrusted the authority of his company to his wife, who handled all the affairs of the economy of the company and its business relations. She kept informed of all relevant news through the wives of generals, and the agents of her spouse reported directly to her. She also conducted business negotiations as the representative of her spouse. Women's participation in trade and commerce on this level was very unusual in 18th-century Russia, but she managed to establish herself as an important person in society and enjoyed great respect even from officials, who referred to her by the honorary title of Mother. Though she lacked education, she reportedly made herself respected by a combination of firmness, charm and an ability to win people over. In 1795, her daughter Anna married the official Nikolai Rezanov, which gave the family a link to the government.

Upon the death of her spouse the same year, she applied for a permit to formally take over his company in her own name. This was controversial not only socially but also legally and led to a legal process that lasted for several years. During the process, she negotiated personally with the Russian government. In 1799, finally, her deal with the Russian government resulted in the foundation of the Russian-American Company.

The Shelikhovs had five surviving daughters and one son.
