= Fort Alexander =

Fort Alexander may refer to:

- Fort Alexander (Hawaii)
- Fort Alexander, Manitoba
- Fort Alexander (St. Petersburg)
