= Nikolai Rezanov =

Russian noble and explorer (1764–1807)

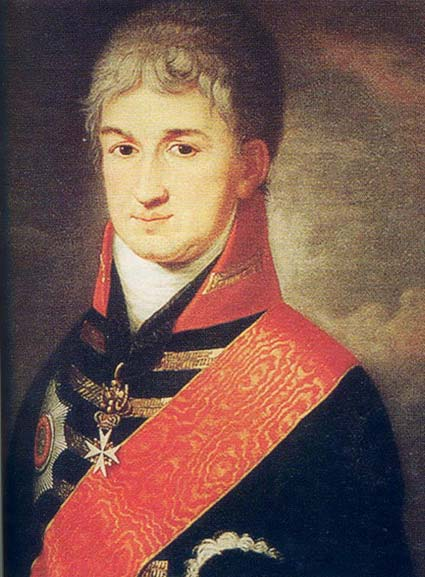
Rezanov's portrait from the State Historical Museum

Nikolai Petrovich Rezanov (Russian: Николай Петрович Резанов, 28 March [O.S. 17 March] 1764 – 13 March [O.S. 1 March] 1807), a Russian nobleman and statesman, promoted the project of Russian colonization of Alaska and California to three successive Emperors of All Russia—Catherine the Great, Paul, and Aleksander I. Aleksander I commissioned Rezanov as Russian ambassador to Japan (1804) with the aim of concluding a commercial treaty. In order to get to his post he was appointed co-commander of the First Russian circumnavigation (1803–1806), led by Adam Johann von Krusenstern. Rezanov left the expedition in 1805 when it returned to Kamchatka after visiting Japan (1804–1805).

Rezanov wrote a lexicon of the Japanese language and several other works, which are preserved in the library of the Saint Petersburg Academy of Sciences, of which he was a member. Rezanov's greatest legacy proved the founding of the Russian-American Company in 1799.

== Early life ==
Rezanov was born in Saint Petersburg on 28 March 1764. He mastered five languages by the age of 14. He joined the Izmaylovsky Regiment at the same age and left five years later in 1784 as captain. Rezanov then spent five years as a court officer in Pskov. In 1791, he joined the staff of Gavrila Derzhavin in his capacity as the private secretary to the Empress Catherine II. Platon Zubov took interest in Rezanov, hiring him as an aide within a year of his employment with Derzhavin. Zubov became interested in the fur trade activities of Irkutsk merchant Grigory Shelikhov. His influence with Catherine was used to secure priests from the Valaam Monastery and colonists for Shelikov's settlements on Kodiak Islands.

== Interest in fur trade ==
In the winter of 1793, Rezanov was appointed as Zubov's personal representative to oversee the fledgling operations. In August 1794, Rezanov arrived at Irkutsk, the center of the Shelikhov-Golikov Company, a city where his father Pyotr had once served as a civil servant for several decades. He likely joined Shelikhov in visiting Kyakhta during the annual trading with the Qing Empire. Rezanov found the land routes to China "inefficient and archaic" when compared to the naval trade of the British in Guangzhou. In January 1795, he married Shelikhov's and Natalia Shelikova's 14-year-old daughter Anna, who came with a dowry in shares of Shelikhov's company. Anna died in childbirth seven years later. Rezanov became a partner in the company, rapidly developing into a keen and tireless man of business. At the death of Shelikhov later in 1795, he became the leading spirit of the wealthy and amalgamated company, but felt marginalized and harassed because the heir to the company was Shelikhov's formidable wife Natalia. Rezanov resolved to develop the company by obtaining for himself and his partners a royal charter with monopoly privileges to exploit and rule, like the privileges granted by Great Britain to the East India Company.

=== Russian-American Company ===
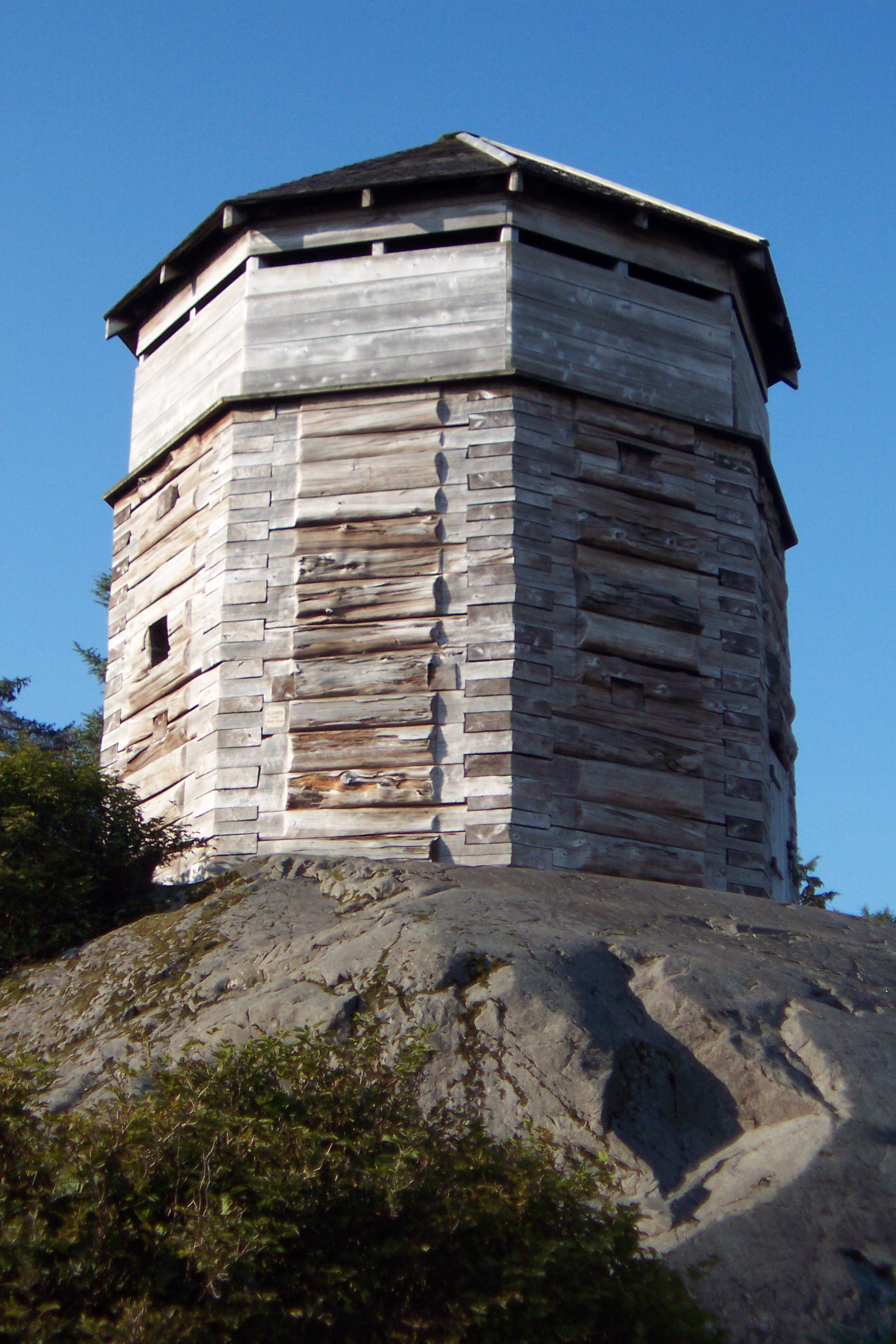
A replica of Russian Block House #1 (one of three watchtowers that guarded the stockade walls at Novo-Arkhangelsk) as constructed by the National Park Service in 1962.

Rezanov had just succeeded in persuading Catherine II to sign his charter when she died (1796), forcing him to begin again to obtain a charter from the unbalanced and intractable Emperor Paul I. For a time the outlook appeared hopeless, but Rezanov's skill, subtlety and address prevailed, and he obtained the Emperor's signature to the Ukase of 1799 shortly before the Emperor was assassinated. The Russian-American Company (RAC) was granted a monopoly over the Pacific Northwest coast of North America, from latitude 55 degrees northward, roughly the southern border of Alaska today; and over the chain of islands extending from Kamchatka northward to Alaska and southward to Japan for a period of twenty years. As a civil servant, Rezanov couldn't be directly named a director of the company, so he was officially designated the RAC's "High Representative in the Capital". The majority of the shares were owned by the Shelikhov family, although Rezanov, Emperor Paul, the future Emperor Alexander I of Russia and Grand Duke Constantine Pavlovich were also shareholders. Initially the company turned a favorable profit until the first years of the 19th century, after which mismanagement and scarcity of nourishing food threatened it with serious losses, if not ultimate ruin.

In order to get a fleet to the area, the first Russian circumnavigation was undertaken, with Rezanov on board, taking the route from Saint Petersburg to Brazil to the Hawaiian Kingdom to Kamchatka. The ships would not only supply the colonies in America but also begin a Russian fur trade between Alaska, Japan, and China, and collect scientific data. Rezanov was appointed as minister plenipotentiary and given the special assignment of opening diplomatic relations with the isolationist Tokugawa shogunate. Before reaching Japan, the Russians visited Hawaii where they learned of the destruction of the Russian colony of Redoubt Saint Michael in America. The Neva, one of the two ships in the expedition, was dispatched north on 31 May 1804 and was critical in taking back Saint Michael in the Battle of Sitka later that year. Rezanov was impressed with the agricultural potential of the Hawaiian Islands, exclaiming that "All of Siberia might be supplied by sugar from Owhyhee". On board the Nadezhda, Rezanov and the remaining crew under Adam Johann von Krusenstern sailed for Petropavlovsk.

Finally departing for Japan in the autumn of 1804, the Nadezhda entered Nagasaki Bay in September. Rezanov did not endear himself with his hosts, a Japanese translator telling him that "All of Japan is talking of you and saying that you are different from the Dutch, prouder, more heated and that you look down on the Japanese". After many months of waiting for the Shogun's decision about opening trade relations with Russia, first isolated on board ship, then confined in a small compound on shore, the Russians left Nagasaki on 5 April 1805, their efforts at opening trade an embarrassing failure.

Nadezhda returned to Petropavlovsk on 24 May 1805, where Rezanov found orders directing him to remain in the Russian colonies as Imperial inspector and plenipotentiary of the company, and to correct the abuses that were ruining the great enterprise. He departed on the Maria on 28 July for Novo-Arkhangelsk by way of the Aleutian islands. While touring the colonies, Rezanov established measures to protect the fur-bearing animals from reckless slaughter, especially on the Pribilof Islands, along with punishing or banishing the worst offenders against the company's laws. Additionally he established several schools and libraries, donating some of his own books, and he established cooking schools that flourished briefly.

In 1806–1807, Rezanov, frustrated by the failure to establish trade relations with Japan, ordered his subordinate Khvostov to attack Iturup, a Japanese military base on Sakhalin. The following series of raids is better known as the Khvostov Incident.

=== Mission to Alta California ===
Conditions in the colonies were harsh; housing was primitive, and food was scarce, with many supply ships being lost at sea. In 1806, the colonists at Sitka were dying of scurvy and starvation. The American maritime fur trader John DeWolf was at Sitka when Rezanov arrived. DeWolf, noting the food crisis and the difficulty the RAC had in acquiring decent ships, offered to sell his ship Juno to the RAC. Rezanov readily agreed. In desperation, on 26 February 1806, Rezanov put together a small crew and left Sitka sailing south on the Juno on a life-or-death expedition to California to buy food and supplies from Russia's chief competitor in colonizing the Pacific coast, the Spanish. Sick with hunger and scurvy, they arrived under the guns of the Spanish overlooking San Francisco Bay on 27 March, meeting with the comandante of San Francisco, Don José Darío Argüello. During a stay of six weeks, Rezanov was successful in bartering and buying wheat, barley, peas, beans, flour, tallow, salt and other items. Departing on 10 May, he reached Sitka on 8 June.

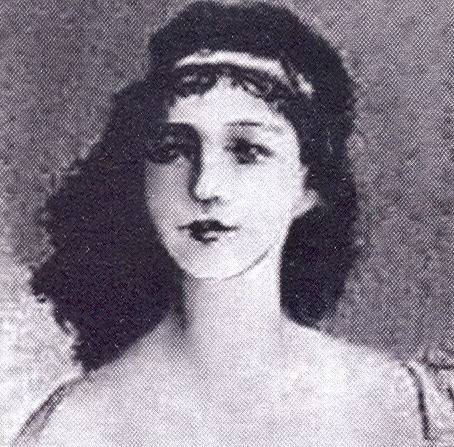
María de la Concepción Marcela Argüello y Moraga (1791–1857)

Rezanov had begun a love affair with the 15-year-old daughter of the comandante Concepción Argüello ("Conchita"). The couple became engaged, causing a sensation in the tight-knit California society, especially because of their differences in religion and nationality, but Rezanov's diplomatic skill won over the clergy. Rezanov had the promise of the perplexed governor to forward a copy of the treaty to Spain at once. He proceeded to Petropavlovsk, where he dispatched his ships, without the consent of the Emperor of All Russia—in effect declaring war on his own—to attack the Japanese island Sakhalin of the lower Kuril group. Rezanov then began the overland trip to Saint Petersburg, hoping to obtain the Emperor's approval for the treaty. He wrote personal letters to Pope Pius VII and to King Charles IV of Spain asking dispensation and royal consent for his marriage.

== Death ==
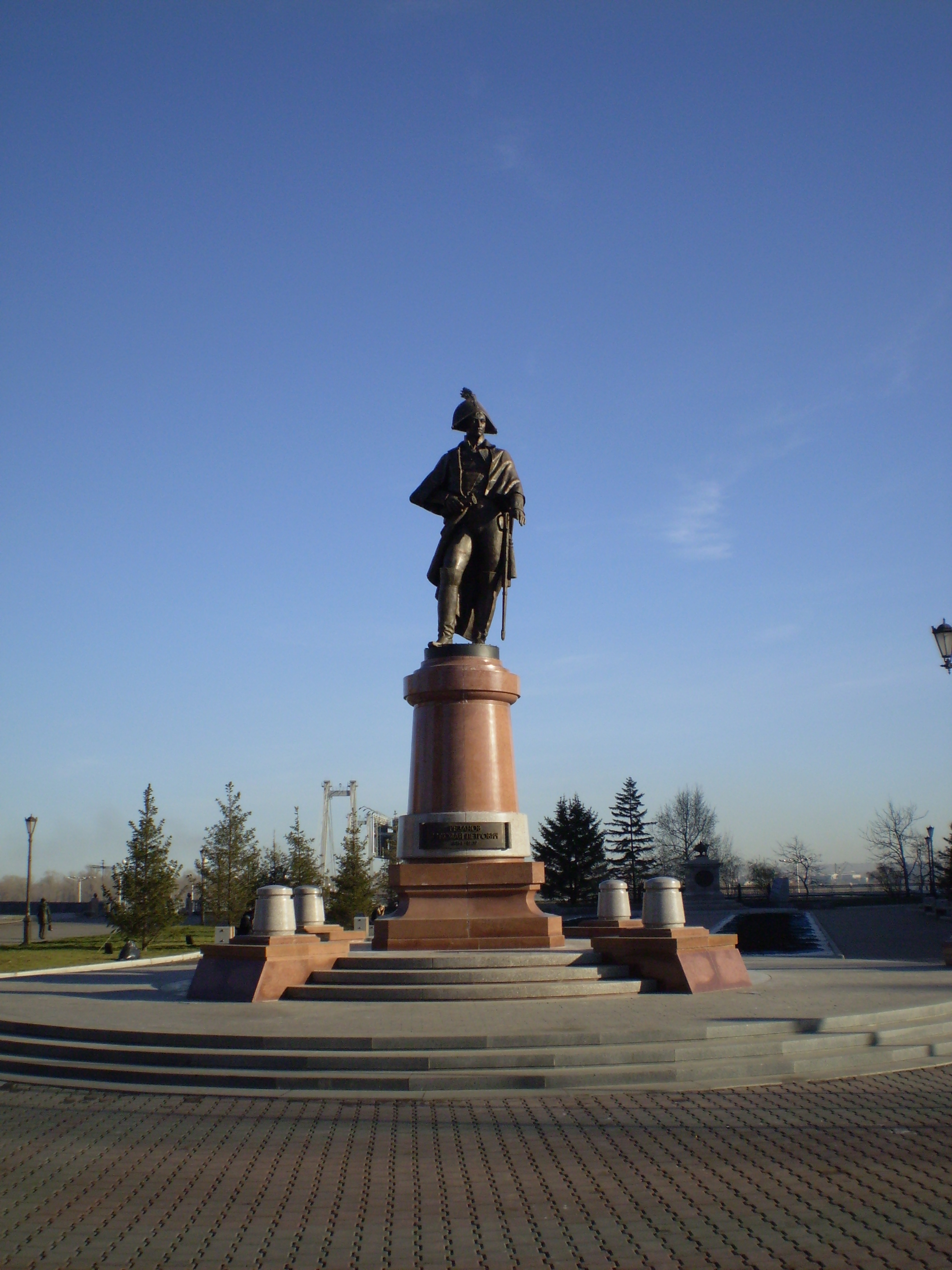
The Ryazanov Monument in Krasnoyarsk

He died of fever and exhaustion in Krasny Yar (now Krasnoyarsk), Siberia, on 8 March 1807. His grave was destroyed by Bolsheviks, but his remains were reburied. On 28 October 2000, at Rezanov's grave in the Trinity churchyard of Krasnoyarsk (where according to one account his remains were moved in the late 1950s) there was a service for the dead and the dedication of a memorial to Rezanov. Poets had taken up the story of Rezanov and Conchita, turning it into a famous romance in Russia. The memorial has a white cross, bearing on one side the inscription "Nikolai Petrovich Rezanov 1764 — 1807. I will never forget you", and on the other side — "Maria Concepcion de Arguello 1791 — 1857. I will never see you again", quoting the lines from "Juno and Avos" by Andrei Voznesensky.

== Legacy ==
Rezanov's romance with Concepción became the subject of Concepcion de Arguello, a ballad by the San Francisco author, Francis Bret Harte, and a 1937 novel, Rezánov and Doña Concha, by the largely forgotten San Francisco author Gertrude Atherton, who had also written a biography of Rezanov on the centennial of his romance with Concepcion.

In 1979, the composer Alexei Rybnikov and the poet Andrey Voznesensky wrote one of the first Russian rock operas, choosing the love affair of Rezanov and Concepcion as their subject and naming the opera after two of Rezanov's ships, Juno and Avos. The original production has enjoyed immense success in the Lenkom Theatre and is still being performed to standing ovations as of 2013. The original actor playing Rezanov from 1979 to 2005, Nikolai Karachentsov, was seriously injured in a car crash in 2005, and has been replaced in the production by Dmitry Pevtsov and Viktor Rakov.

The High Mass for the two lovers was attended by Gary E. Brown, Police Chief of the city of Monterey, California. He was in Siberia as part of a Pointman Leadership Institute team to instruct the National Police in Ethical Based Leadership. Chief Brown scattered on Rezanov's tomb some earth from Conchita's grave, and at the suggestion of Monterey resident John Middleton, a rose from her burial site, and took some earth from Rezanov's grave to scatter on the resting place of Concepcion de Arguello in Benicia, California. "It will connect them forever in a symbolic way" said the chief. He went on to share that the love story which took place 200 years ago forever united the cities of Krasnoyarsk and Monterey.

== See also ==
- Alexandr Baranov
- Nikolay Muravyov-Amursky
