= Phoenix (1794) =

Three-mast ship of the Shelikhov-Golikov Company

Phoenix (also spelled Feniks) was the first ship built in Russian America (roughly equivalent to today's Alaska), for the Shelikhov-Golikov Company, a precursor of the Russian–American Company (RAC). James George Shields, a British mariner in the employ of the Russian Navy, directed her construction, using mainly local materials. The ship was launched at Voskresenskaia on Resurrection Bay in the summer of 1794.

The ship was three-masted, 90 feet long, with a burthen of between 180 and 240 tons (bm) (sources differ), and mounted 22–24 light cannons. It was by far the largest and most important vessel of any Russian American fur trading company of the time.

The ship was named after the British Phoenix, a trading vessel involved in the maritime fur trade, which in turn was the namesake of Phoenix Bay on Afognak Island.

Phoenix was lost at sea in late 1799, last seen on 24 August 1799 when departing Okhotsk for Kodiak Island. Wreckage washed up on shores from Unalaska Island to the Alexander Archipelago. It was the greatest marine catastrophe in the history of Russian America. In addition to the ship itself, 103 people died, including 92 promyshlenniki, Captain James Shields, Bishop Joasaph Bolotov, head of the Russian Ecclesiastical Mission in Alaska, along with cargo worth 569,328 rubles. The total financial loss was 622,328 rubles, over twice the combined capital of the Kodiak and Unalaska RAC Departments.

The loss of Phoenix and its large load of colonist passengers greatly slowed the tempo of the Russian colonization of the Americas, effectively ending RAC Governor Baranov's plan to establish a colony south of Sitka, Alaska on either Prince of Wales Island or in Haida Gwaii. The promyshlenniki passengers had been essential to this plan. In addition, the loss of Bishop Joasaph and his retinue was a major blow for the Orthodox Church in America. It took 40 years for the Church to assign a new bishop to the American diocese. The loss of Captain Shields was also a major setback, as he was one of the most experienced captains and shipbuilders working in Russian America.

== See also ==
- Juvenaly of Alaska
