= New Russia (trading post) =

Archaeological site in Alaska, United States

- New Russia Site
- U.S. National Register of Historic Places
- U.S. National Historic Landmark
- Alaska Heritage Resources Survey
- Location within Alaska
- Location: South of Kardy Lake, about 3.5 miles (5.6 km) southwest of Yakutat
- Nearest city: Yakutat, Alaska
- Coordinates: 59°31′37″N 139°49′36″W
- Area: 1 acre (0.40 ha)
- Built: 1796
- NRHP reference No.: 72001593
- AHRS No.: YAK-029

Significant dates
- Added to NRHP: February 23, 1972
- Designated NHL: June 02, 1978
- Designated AHRS: 1971

New Russia (Russian: Новороссийск; also called Novarassi, Slavarassi, Slavorossiya (Russian: Славороссия), Yakutat Colony, and Yakutat Settlement) was a trading-post for furs and a penal colony established by Russians in 1796 in present-day Yakutat Borough, Alaska, United States. It was presumably named after the Joseph Billings ship Slava Rossii, or "Glory of Russia".

The post was attacked and destroyed by Tlingit people in 1805 during the Russo-Tlingit War of 1802-1805. The 7 buildings inside a stockade, and 5 buildings outside, were burnt in 1805, and the site was never again occupied. The events at New Russia represent a pivotal moment in Russian-Tlingit relations. As an archaeological site, it was declared a National Historic Landmark in 1978.

== Description and history ==
The site of New Russia is outside the city of Yakutat on the Phipps Peninsula, a swampy spit of land which forms the southeastern edge of Yakutat Bay. The site is on the south-facing shoreline of the peninsula, wedged between the Pacific Ocean and a group of saltwater lakes called the Ankau Saltchucks. The site is now densely forested, with little visible evidence of human occupation, beyond a single log wall section seen during a state archaeological survey in 1971. The site's subsurface artifacts include a charcoal layer, clear evidence of significant fire occurring at the site, and it has long been reported locally as a source of other types of artifacts, including cannonballs and iron scraps.

New Russia was established in 1796 by the Russian-American Company as one of a series of outposts and settlements that extended as far south as Old Sitka (called Redoubt St. Archangel Michael by the Russians). The Yakutat site was contemplated as a possible site for the capital of Russian America. The land was purchased from the local Tlingit people by Alexander Baranov in 1794, with settlement planned for the following year. The 1795 settlement attempt was called off due to the hostility of the Tlingits to a hunting party sent to the area in advance of the settlers. A settlement group of 192 Russians were finally landed in June 1796; that year they built two large log buildings, a palisade, and a blockhouse.

By 1805 the settlement had grown to include seven buildings within the palisade, and five outside, and there was a small shipyard which had built two boats. The settlers continued to be viewed with hostility by the Tlingits, who made occasional attacks on hunting parties. In 1802 the Tlingits launched a major attack on Redoubt St. Archangel Michael, destroying that settlement. Alexander Baranov organized a response to this attack, and used the New Russia site as a launching point for the 1804 operation which resulted in the founding of present-day Sitka. In 1805 the Tlingit attacked the New Russia settlement. It was burned to the ground, and all of its occupants except for a few women and children were slaughtered. The site was never reoccupied.

After the attack, the Tlingit successfully prevented the Russians from penetrating into Yakutat Bay, and the area did not receive significant attention. Visiting American traders in the 1870s noted that the site's cellar holes had trees 2 feet (0.61 m) in diameter growing out of them. It was listed on the National Register of Historic Places in 1972, and designated a National Historic Landmark in 1978.

== See also ==
- Maritime Fur Trade
- List of National Historic Landmarks in Alaska
- National Register of Historic Places listings in Yakutat, Alaska

== Sources ==
- Grinev, A. V. (2005). The Tlingit Indians in Russian America, 1741-1867. University of Nebraska Press. ISBN 9780803205383.
