= Ukase of 1799 =

Russian imperial decree chartering the Russian-American Company

Coordinates: 55°00′00″N 131°00′00″W

The Ukase of 1799 (Russian: Указ 1799 года) was a decree of Tsar Paul I issued on 8 July 1799. It formally established the Russian-American Company. The patent was later superseded by Tsar Alexander I's Ukase of 1821.

== Contents ==
The United American Company was given a controlling interest in the chartered Russian-American Company. A monopoly over commercial activities in Russian America, with a southern border of claimed along the 55th parallel north, and on the Kuril Islands was granted for a period of twenty years.

Russian fur traders were forbidden to operate in Russian America unless affiliated with the RAC, although foreign traders were still allowed access. The RAC was also authorised to establish colonies where its directors deemed prudent.

== See also ==
- Russian colonization of the Americas
- Russian Alaska

== Bibliography ==
- United Kingdom (1893). Behring Sea Arbitration. London: Harrison and Sons.
