= Fort Alexander (Hawaii) =

Fort in Hawaii

Coordinates: 22°13′17″N 159°29′49″W

Fort Alexander (Russian: форт Александра) was one of the three forts built by Georg Anton Schäffer on island of Kauai in the Kingdom of Hawaii. It was named after emperor Alexander I, and built in October 1816 near Hanalei River. It was an earthwork fort.

== Schäffer affair ==
Schäffer made an alliance with Kaumualii against Kamehameha I. Schäffer built the Russian forts between 1816 and 1817. Fort Alexander had low earthwork walls and may have had palisades too. One account might refer to the Fort Alexander as a breastwork that had been mounted with a few cannons, but it is unclear whether the account refers to both or only one of the forts in Hanalei. It was built mainly with Russian-American Company's labor unlike Fort Elizabeth that was built partially by Hawaiian natives. Most of the Schäffer's employees were Native Alaskans.

On 17 June 1817 Schäffer proclaimed himself a chief of Hanalei at Fort Alexander, after ordering a Russian flag to be raised and a three cannon salute. He also proclaimed a formal Russian claim for island of Kauai on the same occasion.

Forts Alexander and Barclay were destroyed when the Hawaiians revolted in Hanalei. A distillery was also burnt down, and one Aleutian worker was killed. On 8 May 1817 the Russians were expelled from Hawaii.

== Legacy ==
Fort Alexander was one of the two Russian forts built in Hanalei River Valley. The other fort situated nearby was known as Fort Barclay. However, only Fort Elizabeth has been partially preserved. As of 2002 the location of Fort Alexander is occupied by a hotel (at 5520 Ka Haku Road), and a general outline of part the fort could still be noticed.

== See also ==
- Russian colonization of the Americas
- Fort Ross, California
