= Ukase of 1821 =

Russian proclamation of sovereignty over northwestern North America

The Ukase of 1821 (Russian: Указ 1821 года) was a Russian proclamation (a ukase) of territorial sovereignty over northwestern North America, roughly present-day Alaska and most of the Pacific Northwest. The ukase was declared on September 4, 1821 (O. S.).

== Jurisdiction ==
The first section of the ukase stated that "the pursuits of commerce, whaling, fishing and other industry, on all islands, ports and gulfs, including the whole north-west coast of North America to the 45°50′ north latitude, are all included in this edict for the purpose of granting the same exclusivity to Russian subjects". The second section "prohibits all foreign vessels not only from landing on the coasts and islands belonging to Russia, but, also, does not permit them to approach these islands and coasts within less than one hundred Italian miles, without the vessels being subject to confiscation, along with the whole cargo" (one Italian mile was 2,025 yards/1,852 meters).

The southward limit of Russian territorial claim - to south of the mouth of the Columbia - was revised in light of initial protests by the US and Britain to 51° N latitude, known as "the line of the Emperor Paul", first having been established by the Ukase of 1799 during the reign of Emperor Paul I of Russia. "The line of the Emperor Paul" boundary had been revised northward to 55° north latitude in 1802 (51° N latitude corresponds, roughly, to the northern tip of Vancouver Island at Cape Scott). American and British diplomats and commentators strenuously objected to news of the Ukase of 1821, noting that American, British and French fur-trading vessels had frequented Norfolk Sound (Sitka Sound) before Russia had ever extended its claim eastward; the British pointed out that the landings and explorations of Captains Cook and Vancouver pre-dated any Russian assertion of sovereignty, and claimed (controversially) that British vessels had pioneered the region's fur trade before those of any other nation.

Extended negotiations and exchanges of diplomatic notes and missions by Great Britain and the U.S.A. led to the signing of both the Russo-American Treaty of 1824 and the Anglo-Russian Convention of 1825. In them Russia agreed to cede all claims south of 54°40′ N latitude. The 54°40′ N latitude line was proposed by the British, as general negotiations had focussed on 55° north latitude, but part of the Russian terms was a desire to retain all of Prince of Wales Island, the southern tip of which is at 54°40′ N latitude. British diplomats were less concerned about any eventual land boundary than they were about freedom of navigation in the North Pacific. In addition to the adjustment to include all of Prince of Wales Island within the Russian sphere, the Anglo-Russian Convention of 1825 also established the principle of the lisière, a vaguely defined strip of mainland extending inland ten leagues from the sea, and also included wording concerning the marine boundary north from Prince of Wales Island's southern tip. The latter items mentioned figured prominently in the Alaska boundary dispute of 1821–1903.

== Consequences ==
The only attempt to enforce the ukase occurred in 1822, when the Russian sloop Apollon seized the American ship Pearl on its way from Boston to Novoarkhangelsk (now known as Sitka, Alaska). When the American government protested, the vessel was released and compensation was paid for the detention.

Washington responded to Russia's 1821 ukase in the Monroe Doctrine, promulgated in 1823.

== See also ==
- Russian colonization of the Americas
