= Shelikhov-Golikov Company =

1782–1799 Russian fur trading venture

- Native name: Северо-Восточная компания, 'North-Eastern Company'
- Industry: Fur trade
- Founded: 1782
- Founder: Grigory Shelikhov
- Defunct: 1799
- Fate: Ukase of 1799
- Successor: Russian-American Company
- Headquarters: Irkutsk, later Saint Petersburg
- Key people: Natalia Shelikova, Alexander Baranov

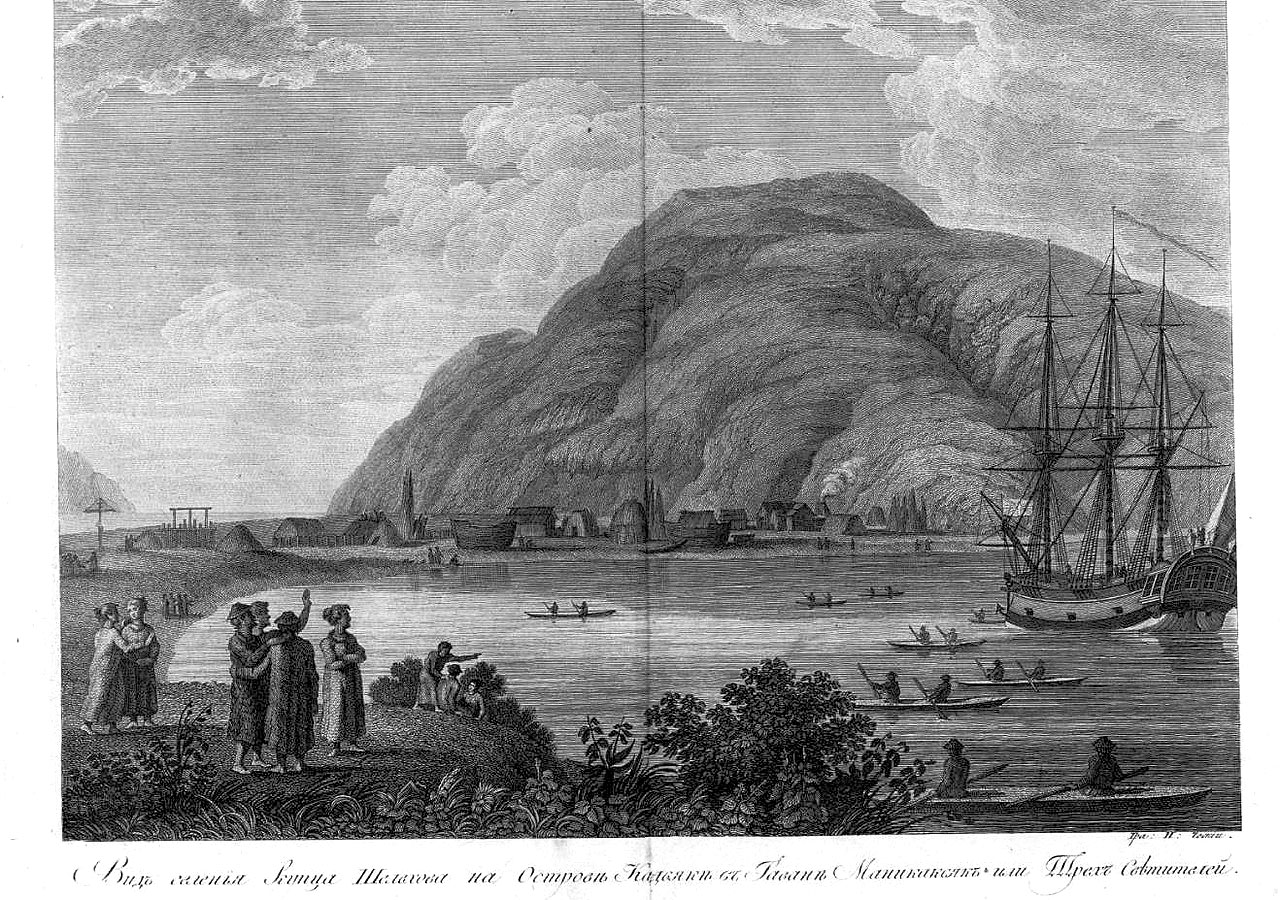
Shelikhov settlement

The Shelikhov-Golikov Company (SGC) was a Russian fur trading venture, founded by Irkutsk entrepreneurs Grigory Shelikhov and Ivan Larionovich Golikov in 1783. Formed in Eastern Siberia during the 1780s along with several competing companies, the SGC had operations in Kurile Islands and areas that later became Russian America. Russian ventures had been focused on maritime operations under promyshlenniki, though costs had continued to rise as more distant sea otter populations had to be exploited. Centered on the Kodiak and several Aleutian Islands, the majority of the company's indentured laborer was recruited among the Aleut and Alutiiq nations. A common practice amongst Russian companies was to take hostages from various villages, to force maritime hunters to gather otter furs. Shelikhov led aggressions on Kodiak Island against the indigenous Alutiiqs in 1784, known as the Awa'uq Massacre, where Russian employees killed over 2,000 people according to some estimates. In consequence of the massacre, the island became fully controlled by the company.

Competing European traders were generally fellow Russian traders, principally the Lebedev-Lastochkin Company. Visiting British and American ships typically paid higher rates for furs when negotiating with Alaskan Natives, which undercut the SGC trading operations. These same merchants were often the only means of supply for the scattered Russian stations, leaving the company dependent on its commercial rivals. The United American Company was created out of rival Russian companies in 1797, including the assets of Lebedev-Lastochkin Company, ensuring its commercial dominance among Russian merchants. In the Ukase of 1799 the company was granted a monopoly among Russians in North America by Tsar Paul I, becoming the basis of the Russian-American Company.

== Formation ==
Both of the partners were natives of Kursk, beginning their commercial cooperation in 1783. The company was funded by the men "to sail to the land of Aliaska, which is called America, to islands known and unknown, in order to trade in furs, make explorations, and arrange voluntary trade with the natives." It was also intended to sell fish and furs to ports in China, Japan, Korea, the Indian subcontinent and the Philippines. In return supplies needed in Eastern Siberia, including salt and rice, would be purchased.

== Operations ==
The first company expedition was sent during 1783 under the command of Shelikhov, with the intention to make several permanent trading posts. The first post was created at Three Saints Bay on Kodiak Island in 1784. During that year, Shelikhov lead a small militia in the Awa'uq Massacre against Alutiiqs living on the island. Before Shelikhov's departure in 1786, Promyshlenniki, Aleuts from the Fox Islands and Alutiiq created company stations on Cook Inlet, Cape Saint Elias and Afognak Island. Shelikov's commercial activities in the Northern Pacific expanded in subsequent years. The North Eastern and Baptist companies were founded in 1790; in the following year the Unalaska Company was formed. The operational quarters were moved to Pavlovskaya in 1792.

== Interest in monopoly ==
Shelikhov departed for Irkutsk on 22 May 1786, intending to inform the Imperial Government of his commercial activities. Both he and his partner Golikov sought a monopoly amongst Russian fur traders in North America from Empress Catherine II. It was argued that only a single consolidated Russian company could be effective against British and American entrepreneurs active in the region. Government subsidies were petitioned for as well, hoped to bolster the operational capacity of the company. Additionally, soldiers of the Russian Imperial Army were requested to be stationed at company outposts.

Ivan V. Yakoby, the Governor-General of Irkutsk, forwarded the requests from the merchants. The official noted that because "those charged with collecting the iasak had often misused their powers", many Alaskan Natives "shunned any allegiance and had attempted to take vengeance on the Russians in any way they could." and advised the iasak be made voluntary for the indigenous of the New World. The College of Commerce supporting giving Golikov and Shelikhov "a noninterest-bearing loan of 200,000 rubles, to be repaid in installments over twenty years..." as the financial advisors felt the Imperial Government could draw profits by "collecting 10 percent duties for imported and exported goods." The Empress gave gifts to two merchants, pleased of their discoveries. Despite the support of government officials, Catherine refused to stray from her laissez-faire economic policies and declined granting a monopoly to the Irkutsk entrepreneurs.

== Later period ==
With Shelikhov's death in 1795 his widow, Natalia Shelikova, was left in control of the company. The various assets were amalgamated into the American Company. Golikov became a partner with Nikolai Mylnikov, another Irkutsk based fur trader, during 1797 in an attempt to rival Shelikhova. Natalia delegated more responsibilities of the daily operations in Russian America upon Alexander Baranov, and used her son-in-law, Nikolai Rezanov to curry favor with the Imperial Court. Tsar Paul I was found to be far more receptive to a Russian fur monopoly than his deceased mother. Rezanov was able to broker a merger with Golikov and Mylnikov on 20 July 1797, creating the United American Company. Natalia sold her assets, valued at ₽688,460, for ₽600,000 and reinvested a third of the proceeds as capital in the new venture.

Two years later the Russian government announced the Ukase of 1799, which granted a fur monopoly in Russian America to the United American Company and established the Russian-American Company.

== Chief Managers ==
No.	Name	Term
1	Grigory Ivanovich Shelikhov (1747–95)	1783 – 22 May 1786
2	Konstantin Alekseevich Samoilov (fl. 1780s)	22 May 1786 – 1787
3	Evstratii Ivanovich Delarov (ca. 1740–1806)	1787 – 27 July 1791
4	Aleksandr Andreyevich Baranov (1746–1819)	27 July 1791 – 1799

== See also ==
- Awa'uq Massacre

== Bibliography ==
=== Articles ===
- Ledonne, John P. (2004). "Proconsular Ambitions on the Chinese Border: Governor General Iakobi's Proposal of War on China". Cahiers du Monde russe. 45 (1/2): 31–59. JSTOR 20174845.
- Klyuchko, V. N. (2014). "Особенности становления и развития акционерных компаний в России: дореволюционный и советский период" [Features of the formation and development of joint-stock companies in Russia: pre-revolutionary and Soviet periods]. Менеджмент и бизнес-администрирование (in Russian) (4). Moscow: Экономическая газета (издательский дом): 8–43.

=== Books ===
- Barratt, Glynn (1981). Russia in Pacific Waters, 1715–1824. Vancouver, BC: University of British Columbia Press.
- Black, Lydia T. (2004). Russians in Alaska, 1732–1867. Fairbanks, AK: University of Alaska Press. ISBN 1889963054.
- Borneman, Walter R. (2003). Alaska: Saga of a Bold Land. New York, NY: HarperCollins.
- Lincoln, W. Bruce (1994). The Conquest of a Continent: Siberia and the Russians. New York, NY: Random House.
- Tikhmenev, Petr A. (1978). A History of the Russian-American Company. Translated by Pierce, Richard A.; Donnelly, Alton S. Seattle: University of Washington Press. ISBN 978-0295955643.
