= Kolmakov Redoubt Site =

Archaeological site in Alaska, United States

- U.S. National Register of Historic Places
- Alaska Heritage Resources Survey
- Location within Alaska
- Location: Address restricted
- Nearest city: Sleetmute, Alaska
- Coordinates: 61°34′02″N 158°37′11″W
- Area: 5 acres (2.0 ha)
- Built: 1841
- NRHP reference No.: 74002322
- AHRS No.: SLT-001
- Added to NRHP: February 15, 1974

The Kolmakov Redoubt Site is a historic archaeological site on the Kuskokwim River in western Alaska. The site is located downriver from the hamlet of Sleetmute, about 21 miles east of Aniak. The site was the location of a major trading post, which was one of the only ones established deep in the Alaskan interior by the Russian-American Company. The first site established by the Russians, in 1832, was little more than a log cabin near the confluence of the Kuskokwim with the Aniak River, and was known as Kolmakov's Townlet, after the trader Fedor Kolmakov. The success of this location prompted the construction in 1833 of an "odinochka" (a small outpost staffed by 1-3 men) at the present location, near the confluence of the Kuskokwim and Kolmakof Rivers. At this site the Russians collected more than 1,400 beaver pelts in 1834, when their entire Alaska trade amounted to about 5,000. This facility was then upgraded to a "redoubt" (not a conventional military redoubt earthworks, but something more akin to a fortified trading post). The site was used until 1867, when American traders took over the fur trade following the Alaska Purchase.

The site was listed on the National Register of Historic Places in 1974.

== See also ==
- National Register of Historic Places listings in Bethel Census Area, Alaska
