= Old Sitka Site =

Archaeological site in Alaska, United States

- Redoubt St. Archangel Michael Site
- U.S. National Register of Historic Places
- U.S. National Historic Landmark
- Alaska Heritage Resources Survey
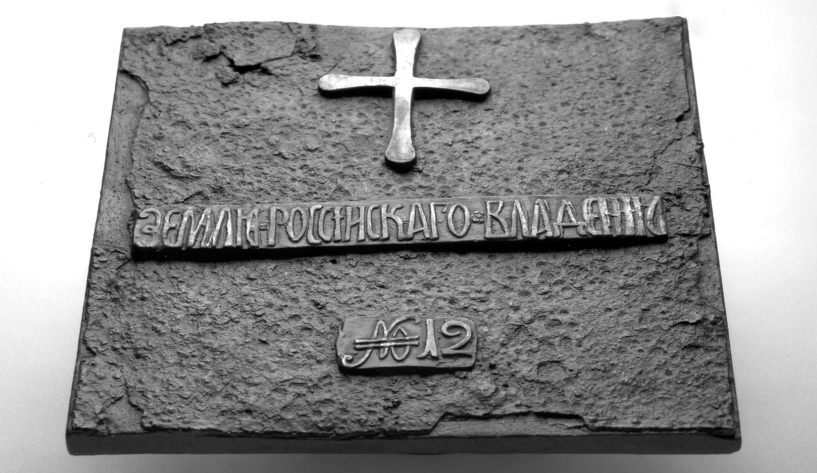
- This Russian plate was buried at the time of the settlement's establishment, and is now in the Russian Bishop's House in Sitka.

- Location within Alaska
- Location: Mile 6.9 of Halibut Point Road, about 6 miles (9.7 km) north of Sitka
- Nearest city: Sitka, Alaska
- Coordinates: 57°07′46″N 135°22′24″W
- Area: 5 acres (2.0 ha)
- Built: 1799
- NRHP reference No.: 66000166
- AHRS No.: SIT-006

Significant dates
- Added to NRHP: October 15, 1966
- Designated NHL: June 13, 1962

The Redoubt St. Archangel Michael Site, also known as the Old Sitka Site and now in Old Sitka State Historical Park, is a National Historic Landmark near Sitka, Alaska. Now of archaeological interest, the site, about 7 miles (11 km) north of Sitka at the end of Halibut Point Road, was the site of the early Russian-American Company settlement known as Redoubt St. Archangel Michael (Russian: форт Архангела Михаила, romanized: Fort Arkhangela Mikhaila). It was the first non-Native settlement on Baranof Island. It was declared a National Historic Landmark in 1962, and was made a state park in 1966.

== History ==
In 1779, Alexander Baranov, a leader of the Russian-American Company, arrived near the site of modern Sitka, and negotiated with the local Tlingit people for a site on which the company could establish an outpost. Although he would have preferred what is now called Castle Hill in Sitka, he was granted this site on Starrigavan Bay. It was not until 1799 that the company established a presence, building a number of log buildings, surrounded by a palisade. In 1802 the Tlingit attacked and destroyed the premises. The Russians returned to the area in force in 1804, and established a permanent presence at Castle Hill after the Battle of Sitka. Replacements were built in 1808, 1823, 1836 and 1894. In 1900 an agricultural station was built and demolished after 1955.

The site was excavated in 1934–35, at which time archaeologists recovered numerous artifacts and identified the locations of the Russian buildings of the former redoubt. In the years that followed the site was partially compromised by erosion and construction activity. 1 The state built a wayside stop at the site in 1966, and now operates it as a state park. It was designated a National Historic Landmark (as "Redoubt St. Archangel Michael Site") in 1962, and listed on the National Register of Historic Places in 1966 (as "Old Sitka Site").

== See also ==
- List of National Historic Landmarks in Alaska
- National Register of Historic Places listings in Sitka City and Borough, Alaska
