= Juvenaly of Alaska =

Russian hieromartyr

Saint Juvenaly of Alaska
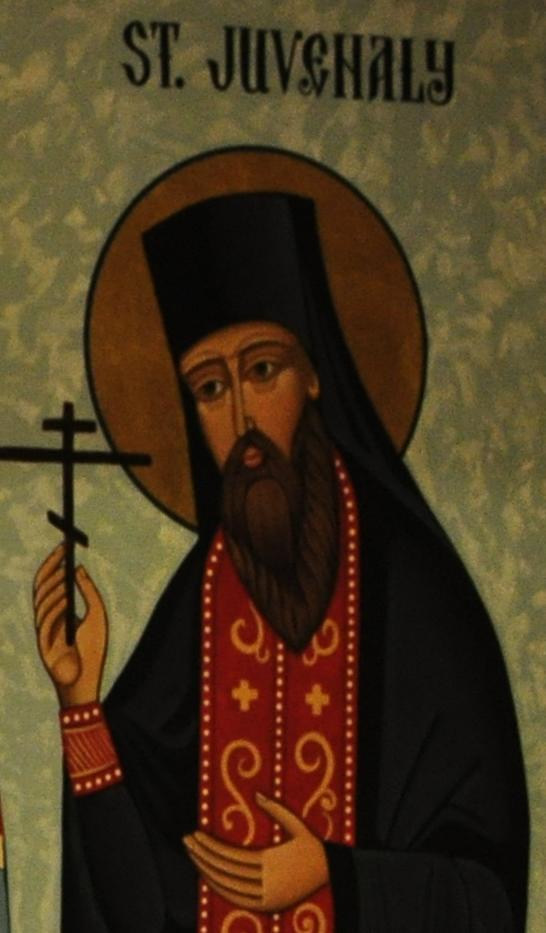
- Icon of Juvenaly

Protomartyr of America, Hieromartyr
- Born: Yakov Feodorov Govorukhin c. 1761; Yekaterinburg, Russia
- Died: c. 1796; Kuinerrak, Alaska
- Venerated in: Eastern Orthodoxy
- Canonized: 1980, Alaska by Russian Orthodox Church
- Feast: 2 July; 24 September; 12 December
- Attributes: Monastic habit Epitrachelion; Cross
- Patronage: Alaska

Juvenaly of Alaska (Russian: Иеромонах Ювена́лий; 1761, Yekaterinburg, Russia – 1796, Kuinerrak, Alaska), Protomartyr of America, was a Russian hieromartyr and member of the first group of Orthodox missionaries who came from the monasteries of Valaam and Konevets to evangelize the native inhabitants of Alaska. He died while evangelizing among the Yupik Eskimos on the mainland of Alaska in 1796. His feast day is celebrated on July 2, and he is also commemorated with all the saints of Alaska (September 24), and with the first martyrs of the American land (December 12).

== Life ==
He was born in 1761 in Yekaterinburg, Russia, and was named Yakov Feodorov Govorukhin. He was the son of smelting master Feodor Govorukhin of the Nerchinsk mines. Yakov himself also worked at the Voskresenskiĭ mines in Kolyvan with the rank of an ensign. In 1791 he left this position of his own will and went to live in the Valaam Monastery as a novice. In 1793 he was selected for the American mission and was tonsured a monk and ordained a priest. He was given the name Juvenaly in memory of St. Juvenal, fifth century Patriarch of Jerusalem.

In 1793, a group of 10 monks and novices were selected from the Valaam and Konevets Monasteries to serve as missionaries in Russian America. This group of missionaries was led by Archimandrite Joasaph Bolotov and was composed of four hieromonks including Juvenaly and Makary, one hierodeacon and a monk named German, as well as four novices. Their destination was the Russian settlement on Kodiak Island in the Gulf of Alaska, some 8,000 miles away across the length of Asia through Siberia and then the Bering Sea of the northern Pacific Ocean. The group arrived on Kodiak Island on September 24, 1794, to an unexpected scene. The settlement was primitive beyond what they were told, and violence was commonplace. The promised church was not there, and the promised supplies for three years were absent.

After their arrival, Fathers Juvenaly and Makary went around the island of Kodiak and in two months and baptized the local Sugpiaq Eskimos, altogether 6,000 people. In 1795, Fr. Juvenaly left for the mainland, and he baptized Chugach Eskimos in Nuchek and Dena'ina Indians in Kenai. The following year he continued west, and he proceeded west of Lake Iliamna "to the northern parts of the continent and far beyond Alyaska, and the local peoples there, who had not yet been pacified by us, killed him and three promyshlenniki and a few baptized Kenia natives."

== Death ==
Father Juvenaly died in the village of Kuinerrak at the mouth of the Kuskokwim River sometime in 1796.

False accounts of the circumstances of his death became widely known first through the writings of Ioann Veniaminov and later through the so-called diary of Fr. Juvenaly, which was fabricated by Ivan Petroff. Veniaminov (1840, II: 155–156/1984: 235) writes:

The cause of his death was not only that he forbade polygyny, as has been reported, but more the fact that the local toions and notables, after having given him their children to be educated at Kad'iak, later regretted it. Overtaking him, they fell upon him and took back their children, killing him as a deceiver. It is said that Iuvenaliĭ, when attacked by the savages, did not attempt either to flee or to defend himself, which he might have done with success, but surrendered himself without any kind of resistance into their hands asking only for the safety of his companions, which was granted him. Afterwards the Americans themselves related that Iuvenaliĭ, after having been, to all intents and purposes, killed, rose up and followed his murderers, speaking to them (probably the same as he had said formerly). Considering him still living, the savages fell upon him again and beat him. But again he rose and went after them. This was repeated several times. At last the savages, in order to be rid of him, hacked his body into small pieces. Only then did the Preacher of the Word of God and, one may say, martyr, fall silent. However, according to the tales of the self-same Americans, in that place where his remains were, there immediately appeared a pillar of smoke, extending toward the sky. How long this phenomenon lasted is not known.

Petroff's "A daily journal kept by the Rev. Father Juvenal" has been proved by Lydia T. Black beyond all doubt to be a fabrication: "This mildly uninspiring document, which contradicts both Church and Native traditions about the saint's activities, was summarized in Bancroft's influential History of Alaska and accepted for a century as a major primary source. However, it is now very strongly suspected of being a forgery written by one of Bancroft's assistants."

== Veneration ==
Juvenaly was canonized in 1980 in the Eastern Orthodox Church.

== Hymns ==
=== From the September 24 Feast Day ===
Troparion (Tone 4)

Today Alaska rejoices and America celebrates,
For the new world has been sanctified by martyrdom.
Kodiak echoes with songs of thanksgiving,
Iliamna and Kenai observe the festival of faith.
The Apostle and martyr Juvenaly is glorified,
And Peter the Aleut is exalted by his voluntary sacrifice,
In their devotion and love for the Lord
They willingly endured persecution and death for the Truth,
Now in the Kingdom of Heaven they intercede for our souls!

Kontakion (Tone 4)

Today Valaam joins Alaska
In celebrating this joyous feast,
As her spiritual son Juvenaly
Embraces the new martyr Peter with love.
Together they suffered for the Lord in America
And united the old world with the new by their voluntary sacrifice.
Now forever they stand before the King of glory and intercede for our souls.

== Sources ==
- Black, Lydia T., "The Daily Journal of Reverend Father Juvenal: A Cautionary Tale," Ethnohistory 28(1)33, 1981.
- L'vov, Apollinariĭ Nikolayevič, 1894: "Краткiя историческiя свѣдѣнiя объ учрежденiи въ Сѣверной Америкѣ православной миссiй, объ основанiи Кадьякской епархiи и о дѣятельности тамъ первыхъ миссiонеровъ." (Къ столѣнему юбилею православiя въ Америкѣ.) Прибавленiя къ Церковнымъ вѣдомостямъ, № 38–39, 17 и 24 сентября, стр. 1317–1326, 1361–1370.
- Oleksa, Michael, 1983: "The oral tradition about the death of Fr Juvenaly among the native peoples of southwestern Alaska", St. Vladimir's Theological Quarterly 27:2 (1983), pp. 133–137.
- Oleksa, Michael, 1986: "The Death of Hieromonk Juvenaly", St. Vladimir's Theological Quarterly 30:3 (1986), pp. 231–268.
- Onufriĭ, hierodeacon (Makhanov, Oleg Harisovich), 2005: Причал молитв уедининных. Царское дело, Санкт-Петербург.
- Passek, Vadim, 1842: Очерки Россіи, издавлемые Вадимомъ Пассекомъ, книга V: «Распространеніе православной вѣры въ Америкѣ.» Москва.
- Veniaminov, Ioann, 1840: Записки объ островахъ Уналашкинскаго отдѣла. Санктпетегбургъ.
- Veniaminov, Ioann, 1984: Notes on the Islands of the Unalashka District. Alaska History no. 27. The Limestone Press. Kingston, Ontario.
