= The Limestone Press =

- Status: Inactive
- Founded: 1972
- Founder: Richard Pierce
- Country of origin: Canada
- Headquarters location: Kingston, Ontario
- Distribution: University of Alaska Press
- Publication types: Books

The Limestone Press is a one-man publishing house, established in 1972 by historian Richard Pierce (1918–2004). Pierce lived and worked at that time in Kingston, Ontario, and he chose the name from the nickname of Kingston, the “Limestone City”, which has its origins in its many limestone buildings. He published mainly books on Alaska’s history, mostly concerning its Russian era, but also on Ukrainian and African and other topics, as well as books dealing with Kingston's history.

It is unclear whether The Limestone Press will publish any new works, since Pierce died in 2004. The remaining back catalogue is being distributed by the University of Alaska Press.

== The Alaska History Series ==
- Note: The name of the series was originally Materials for the Study of Alaska History, under which name it appeared from 1972 to 1980. This covers numbers 1–17. The new name Alaska History begins with no. 18. From 1993 on the series has been distributed solely by the University of Alaska Press, which is also reflected in the ISBNs.
- Note: The Alaska History Series is not to be confused with Alaska History, a journal published by the Alaska Historical Society.
1. Richard A. Pierce: Alaskan Shipping, 1867–1878. Arrivals And Departures at the Port of Sitka. 1972. 72 pp., illustrated. Shipping at the end of the Russian regime and during the first decade of American rule. LCSH: Ship registers—Sitka, Alaska; Geographical Subject: Sitka (Alaska)—History—Sources. This book does not have an ISBN. Printing: 250 copies.
2. Frederic William Howay: A List of Trading Vessels in the Maritime Fur Trade, 1785–1825. 1973. 209 pp., bibliography, index. Reprinted from various issues of Proceedings and Transactions of the Royal Society of Canada, vol. XXIV to XXVII, 1930–1934. Fundamental work on early Northwest Coast. LCSH: Ship registers—Alaska Geographical Subject: Alaska—History—Sources. Printing: 550 copies. ISBN 0-919642-51-9 (hardcover); ISBN 0-919642-52-7 paperback.
3. Kiril Timofeevich Khlebnikov: Baranov, Chief Manager of the Russian Colonies in America. 1973. 140 pp., illustrated, index. Biography of the first governor of the Russian colonies in America. Translated from Russian edition of 1835. ISBN 0-919642-50-0. DDC: 979.8020924. Out of print (1990). Original title: Жизнеописаніе Александра Андреевича Баранова, главнаго правителя россійскихъ колоніи въ Америкѣ.
4. Svetlana Grigor’evna Fedorova: The Russian Population in Alaska and California, Late 18th Century to 1867. 1973. 367 pp., illustrated, maps, index. Translated from the Russian edition of 1971 by Richard A. Pierce and Alton S. Donnelly. ISBN 0-919642-53-5. Original title: Русское население Аляски и Калифорнии: конец XVIII века –1867.
5. Vasiliĭ Nikolaevich Berkh (Bergh): A Chronological History of the Discovery of the Aleutian Islands. 1974. 121 pp., illustrated, maps, index. Translated from the Russian edition of 1823. Out of print (1990). ISBN 0-919642-54-3. Original title: Хронологическая исторія открытія Алеутскихъ острововъ, или подвиги Россійскаго купечества. LCSH: Fur trade—Alaska—Aleutian Islands Geographical Subject: America—Discovery and exploration—Russian; Aleutian Islands (Alaska)—Discovery and exploration.
6. Raisa Vsevolodovna Makarova: Russians on the Pacific, 1743–1799. 1975. 301 pp., illustrated, maps, index. Translated from Russian edition of 1968. ISBN 0-919642-61-6. Out of print (1990). Original title: Русские на Тихом океане во второй половине XVIII в. / Р. В. Макарова; Мин. высшего и среднего спец. образования РСФСР;Московский гос. историко-архивный институт. LCSH: Fur trade—Northwest coast of North America; Russians in the Northwest coast of North America; Geographical Subject: Northwest coast of North America—Discovery and exploration.
7. Documents on the History of the Russian-American Company. 1976. 220 pp., illustrated, maps, index. Translated from the Russian edition of 1957 by Marina Ramsay. ISBN 0-919642-56-X. DDC: 979.802. Original title: К истории Российско-американской компании. Subject (Corporate Name): Russian-American Company. Geographical Subject: Alaska, History to 1867, Sources.
8. Richard A. Pierce: Russia's Hawaiian Adventure, 1815–1817. 1976. xvii, 245 p., maps (on lining papers), illustrated, maps, index. Reprint of the 1965 edition from University of California Press. ISBN 0-919642-68-3 (hardcover ed.) ISBN 0-919642-69-1 (paperback ed.).
9. H. W. Elliott: The Seal Islands of Alaska. 1976. Reprint of the 1881 edition, prepared for the Tenth Census of the United States. 176 pp., large format, many illustrations. Fundamental work on Alaska sealing and the Pribilof Islands. ISBN 0-919642-72-1. Original work: A Monograph of the Seal-Islands of Alaska. Washington, 1882.
10. Gavriil Ivanovich Davydov: Two Voyages to Russian America, 1802–1807. 1977. 257 pp., illustrated, maps, index. Translated from the Russian edition of 1810–1812. Lively account of travel, history and ethnography in Siberia and Russian America (modern Alaska). Invalid ISBN 0-919642-75-6. Original title: Двукратное путешествие въ Америку морскихъ офицеровъ Хвостова и Давыдова, писанное симъ последнимъ.
11. The Russian Orthodox Religious Mission in America, 1794–1837. 1978. 257 pp., illustrated, index. 186 pp. Translated from the Russian edition of 1894. Documents on the mission and the life of its most famous member, the monk German (St. Herman), with ethnographic notes on the Kodiak islanders and Aleuts by the Hieromonk Gedeon. ISBN 0-919642-80-2. Out of print (1990). Subject Aleuts—Missions; Missions—Alaska—Aleutian Islands. Other Keywords: History of missionary work, Alaska. Original title: Очеркъ изъ исторiи американской православной духовной миссiи (Кадьякской миссiи 1794–1837 гг.)
12. H.M.S. Sulphur on the Northwest and California Coasts, 1837 and 1839. Accounts by Captain Edward Belcher and Midshipman G. (Francis Guillemard) Simpkinson, concerning native peoples of Russian America and California. 1979. Edited by Richard Pierce and John H. Winslow. 144 pp., illustrated, maps. ISBN 0-919642-75-6.
13. Piotr Aleksandrovich Tikhmenev: A History of the Russian-American Company. Vol. 2: Documents. 1979. Appendices to a classic account. (Vol. 1 published by University of Washington Press, 1978.) Translated from the Russian edition of 1861–1863. ISBN 0-919642-81-0. DDC: 979.802. LCC: F907. Original title: Историческое обозрѣніе образованіе россійско-американской компаніи и дѣйствій ея до настоящаго времени / составилъ П. Тихменевъ, Санктпетербургъ, 1861–1863.
14. N. A. Ivashintsov: Russian Round-the-World Voyages, 1803–1849. 1980. 156 pp., illustrated, maps. translated by Glynn R. Barratt; edited by Richard A. Pierce. Translated from Russian edition of 1849, with supplementary list of voyages to 1867. Summaries, based on logs, indicating ports of call, activities and personnel. Essential for several fields of research. Illustrated. ISBN 0-919642-76-4. Original title: Русскія кругосвѣтныя путешествія, съ 1803 по 1849 годъ / Н. Ивашинцовъ, Санктпетербургъ, 1872. 245 pp.
15. Baron Ferdinand von Wrangel: Russian America. Statistical and Ethnographic Information on the Russian Possessions on the Northwest Coast of America. 1980. With additional material by Karl-Ernst Baer. Translated from the German edition, published in St. Petersburg, 1839. Translated by Mary Sadouski, edited by Richard Pierce. Original title: Statistische und ethnographische Nachrichten über die russischen Besitzungen an der Nordwestküste von Amerika / gesammelt von Contre-Admiral von Wrangel; hrsg. von K. E. von Baer. 204 pp. ISBN 0-919642-79-9.
16. The Journal of Iakov Netsvetov: The Atka Years, 1828–1844. 1980. Translated by Lydia Black from the unpublished manuscript, with notes and supplements on the history and ethnography of the Aleutian Islands. 340 pp. ISBN 0-919642-92-6.
17. Siberia and Northwestern America, 1788–1792. The Journal of Carl Heinrich Merck, Naturalist With the Russian Scientific Expedition Led By Captain Joseph Billings And Gavriil Sarychev. 1980. Translated by Fritz Jaenach from the unpublished German manuscript. Includes ethnographic, biological and geological observations. Illustrated, maps, index. ISBN 0-919642-93-4
18. David Hunter Miller: The Alaska Treaty. 1981. 221 pp. Definitive study of the Alaska Purchase, prepared in 1944 for the U.S. Dept. of State's Treaty Series, but never published. ISBN 0-919642-95-0. DDC: 979.802.
19. Grigoriĭ Ivanovich Shelikhov: Voyage to America, 1783–1785. 1981. 162 pp., illustrated, maps, index, supplementary materials. Translated from Russian edition of 1812. Includes Shelikhov's book published in 1791, with materials erroneously attributed to him since early 19th century. Original title: Россійскаго купца Именитаго Рыльскаго гражданина Григоья Шелехова первое странствование съ 1785 по 1787 годъ изъ Охотска по Восточному Океану къ Американскимъ берегамъ, и возвращеніе его въ Россію, съ обстоятельнымъ увѣдомленіемъ объ открытіи новообрѣтенныхъ имъ острововъ Кыктака и Афагнака [и проч]. ISBN 0-919642-67-5.
20. Kodiak and Afognak Life, 1868–1870. 1981. The Journals of Lieutenants E. L. Huggins and John Campbell, and merchant Frederick Sargent, with other materials relating to the first years of the American regime in Alaska, including portraits, and early map of Kodiak. Details on ship movements, personnel, trade and life style. 163 pp. ISBN 0-919642-96-9
21. Mikhail Dmitrievich Teben’kov: Atlas of the Northwest Coasts of America From Bering Strait to Cape Corrientes and the Aleutian Islands with Several Sheets on the Northwest Coast of Asia. 1981. Compiled by Teben’kov while governor of Russian America, and published in 1852. 39 sheets, boxed, with softbound vol. with rare Hydrographic Notes (109 pp.) and supplementary information. Original titles: Атласъ сѣверозападныхъ береговъ Америки отъ Берингова пролива до мыса Корріэнтесъ и Острововъ Алеутскихъ съ присовокупленіемъ нѣкоторыхъ мѣстъ Сѣверовосточнаго берега Азіи and Гидрографическія замѣчанія къ Атласу сѣверозападныхъ береговъ Америки, острововъ Алеутскихь и нѣкоторыхъ другихъ мѣстъ Сѣвернаго Тихаго Океана / капитана 1 ранга Тебѣнькова. 1981. ISBN 0-919642-55-1. DDC: 623.892245. LCC: G1106.
22. G. R. Adams: Life on the Yukon, 1865–1867. 1982. 219 pp., illustrated. From manuscript diary of a participant in the Western Union Telegraph Expedition, and his autobiographical account, written later. ISBN 0-919642-87-X
23. Dorothy Jean Ray: Ethnohistory in the Arctic: The Bering Strait Eskimo. 1983. Articles assembled in one volume for the first time, on early trade, the legendary 17th century Russian settlement, the history of St. Michael, Eskimo picture writing, land tenure and polity, settlement and subsistence patterns, and place names. Translated of Russian accounts of the Vasil’ev–Shishmarev expedition (1819–1822). 280 pp., illustrated, maps. ISBN 0-919642-98-5. LCC: E99.
24. Lydia Black: Atka. An Ethnohistory of the Western Aleutians. 1984. 219 pp., illustrated. Problems of prehistory, ethnography, and 18th century foreign contacts, with a list of Russian voyages, the account of navigator Vasil’ev (1811–1812), Fr. Ioann Veniaminov, and biographical materials. ISBN 0-919642-99-3. DDC: 979.83. LCC: F951.
25. The Russian-American Company. Correspondence of the Governors. Communications Sent: 1818. 1984. xiv, 194 pp., illustrated, index, notes. Translated of seldom-used manuscript material in U.S. National Archives. ISBN 0-919642-02-0
26. The Journals of Iakov Netsvetov: The Yukon Years, 1845–1863. 1984. 505 pp., illustrated, maps. Translated by Lydia Black from unpublished manuscript in Library of Congress, with notes and appendices on the history and ethnography of the Yukon and Kuskokwim regions of Alaska. ISBN 0-919642-01-2.
27. Ioann Veniaminov (St. Innokentiĭ): Notes on the Islands of the Unalashka District. 1985. 511 pp., illustrated. Translated from Russian edition, St. Petersburg, 1840. A classic account. Published jointly by the Limestone Press and the Elmer E. Rasmuson Library Translation Program. Original title: Записки объ островахъ Уналашкинскаго отдѣла and Записки объ атхинскихъ алеутахъ и колошахъ. ISBN 0-919642-03-9.
28. Richard A. Pierce: Builders of Alaska: The Russian Governors, 1818–1867. 1986. Biographies of Alaska’s 13 forgotten governors, from Hagemeister to Maksutov. 53 pp., illustrated. ISBN 0-919642-07-1.
29. Frederic Litke: A Voyage Around The World, 1826–1829. Vol. I: To Russian America and Siberia, 1826–1827. 1987.Translated from French edition (Paris, 1835) by R. Marshall; with a parallel account by F. H. Baron von Kittlitz. Translated from the German edition of 1854 by V. J. Moessner. 232 pp., maps, illustrated. Original French title: Voyage autour du monde,: exécuté par ordre de sa majesté l’empereur Nicolas Ier, sur la corvette Le Séniavine, dans les années 1826, 1827, 1828 et 1829, par Frédéric Lutké, ... commandant de l’expédition. Partie historique, avec un atlas, litographié d’après les dessins originaux d’Alexandre Postels et du baron Kittlitz. Traduit du russe sur le manuscrit original, sous les yeux de l’auteur, par le conseiller d’état F. Boyé. Tome I–III. Original Russian title: Путешествіе вокругъ свѣта, совершенное по повелѣнію императора Николая I, на военномъ шлюпѣ Сенявинъ въ 1826, 1827, 1828 и 1829 годахъ, Флота Капитаномъ Ѳедоромъ Литке. ISBN 0-919642-97-7.
30. A. I. Alekseev: The Odyssey of a Russian Scientist: I. G. Voznesenskiĭ in Alaska, California and Siberia, 1839–1849. 1988. Translated from the Russian edition (Moscow, 1977), by Wilma C. Follette. Edited by Richard A. Pierce 130 pp., illustrated, maps.
31. Ann Fienup-Riordan, editor: The Yup’ik Eskimo as Described in the Travel Journals and Ethnographic Accounts of John and Edith Kilbuck, 1885–1900. 1988. lvii + 528 pp., illustrated, maps. ISBN 0-919642-17-9.
32. The Round The World Voyage of Hieromonk Gideon 1803–1809. 1989. Translated with introduction and notes by Lydia T. Black. xiii + 184 pp., illustrated, maps. ISBN 0-919642-20-9. Alaska State Library Historical Monograph No. 9.
33. Richard A. Pierce: Russian America, A Biographical Dictionary. 1990. Data on over 600 Russian and foreign statesmen, explorers, administrators, and skippers, Native leaders and women. 560 pp., illustrated. ISBN 0-919642-45-4.
34. A. I. Alekseev: The Destiny of Russian America, 1741–1867. 1990. Translated from the Russian edition, Moscow, 1975. 340 pp. A comprehensive history. ISBN 0-919642-13-6. DDC: 979.802. LCC: F907.
35. Russia in North America. Proceedings of the 2nd International Conference on Russian America. Sitka, Alaska, August 19–22, 1987. 1990. 527 pp., illustrated. ISBN 0-919642-44-6
36. Katherine Plummer, editor: A Japanese Glimpse at the Outside World, 1839–1843. The Travels of Jirokichi in Hawaii, Siberia & Alaska. Adapted from a translation of Bandan. 1991. 182 +94 pp., illustrated. ISBN 0-919642-34-9
37. Rhys Richards: Captain Simon Metcalfe, Pioneer Fur Trader in the Pacific Northwest, Hawaii and China, 1787–1794. 1991. 234 pp., illustrated. ISBN 0-919642-37-3. DDC: 338.476753092.
38. The Lovtsov Atlas of the North Pacific Ocean, Compiled at Bol’sheretsk, Kamchatka, in 1782. 1991. Translated, with introduction and notes, by Lydia T. Black. ISBN 0-919642-38-1
39. E. O. Essig, Adele Ogden & Clarence John DuFour: Fort Ross, California Outpost of Russia. Alaska, 1812–1841. 1991. Reprint. Quarterly of the California Historical Society, Vol. 12: 3, San Francisco, September 1933. ISBN 0-919642-27-6. DDC: 979.4. LCC: F869.
40. Roscoe, Fredition: From Humboldt to Kodiak 1886–1895. Recollections of a frontier childhood. 1992. Edited by Stanley N. Roscoe. Softbound. ISBN 0-919642-40-3.
41. Georg Heinrich von Langsdorff: Remarks and Observations on a Voyage Around the World From 1803 to 1807. 1993. A new translation from German edition of 1812, by Joan Moessner. Two volumes in one. Illustrated. ISBN 1-895901-00-6.
42. Kiril Timofeevich Khlebnikov: Notes on Russian America, Parts II–IV: Kad’iak, Unalashka, Atkha, The Pribylovs and St. Matthew Island. 1994. 424 pp. Original title: Русская Америка в неопубликованных записках К. Т. Хлебникова: Ново-Архангельск. Наука, Л., 1979. Transcribed by Roza G. Liapunova and Svetlana Fedorova. Translated from the Russian edition of 1979 by Marina Ramsay. ISBN 1-895901-02-2.
43. Kiril Timofeevich Khlebnikov: Notes on Russian America. Part I: Novo-Arkhangel’sk. 1994. 308 pp. Original title: Русская Америка в «записках» К. Т. Хлебникова: Ново-Архангельск. Наука, М., 1985. Transcribed by Svetlana Fedorova. Translated from the Russian edition of 1985 by Serge Lecomte and Richard A. Pierce. ISBN 1-895901-04-9.
44. John Middleton: Clothing in Colonial Russian America. A New Look. 1996. Edited by Lyn Kalani. 138 pp, illustrated. ISBN 1-895901-08-1.
45. Bolkhovitinov, Nikolai Nikolaevich: Russian-American Relations and the Sale of Alaska, 1834–1867. 1996. Translated and edited by Richard A. Pierce. 405 pp, illustrated, index. ISBN 1-895901-06-5.
46. Robert DeArmond: The USS Saginaw in Alaskan Waters 1867–1868. 1997. 174 pp. ISBN 1-895901-10-3. ISBN 978-1-895901-10-8.
47. Mary Malloy: ‘Boston Men’ on the Northwest Coast: The American Maritime Fur Trade. 232 pp. ISBN 1-895901-18-9.
48. Richard A. Pierce (ed.): The Romance of Nikolai Rezanov and Concepcion Arguello/The Concha Arguello Story. 1998. ISBN 1-895901-22-7. Paperback.
49. Lydia Black: History and Ethnohistory of the Aleutians East Borough. 1999. ISBN 1-895901-26-X. ISBN 978-1-895901-26-9.
50. Emily R. Baker: Caleb Reynolds: American Seafarer. 2000, pp. xiv + 213, ill., maps, bibliography, appendices, notes. index. Hardback. ISBN 1-895901-25-1.
51. Alix O’Grady: From the Baltic to Russian America, 1829–1836. The Journey of Elisabeth von Wrangell. 2001. ISBN 1-895901-27-8.

== Books on Ukraine ==
- Lubomyr Y. Luciuk: Ukrainians in the Making: Their Kingston Story. 1980. ISBN 0-919642-91-8.
- Bohdan Kordan and Lubomyr Luciuk, eds. A Delicate and Difficult Question: Documents in the History of Ukrainians in Canada, 1899–1962. 1986. ISBN 0-919642-08-X.
- Bohdan Kordan and Lubomyr Luciuk, compilers: Anglo-American Perspectives on the Ukrainian Question, 1938–1951: A Documentary Collection. Foreword by Hugh A. Macdonald. 1987. ISBN 0-919642-26-8. DDC: 947.710842. LCC: DK508.833.
- Marco Carynnyk, Lubomyr Luciuk & Bohdan Kordan, eds.: The Foreign Office and the Famine: British Documents on Ukraine and the Great Famine of 1932–1933. Foreword by Michael R. Marrus. 1988. ISBN 0-919642-29-2. DDC: 363.809477109043. LCC: HC337.
- Lubomyr Y. Luciuk: A Time for Atonement: Canada's First National Internment Operations and the Ukrainian Canadians, 1914–1920. 1988. ISBN 0-919642-28-4.

== Books on Southern Africa ==
- K. Nyamayaro Mufuka: Missions and politics in Malawi. ca. 1977. ISBN 0-919642-73-X (also ISBN 0-919642-74-8). DDC: 266.26897
- Bridglal Pachai: Land and Politics in Malawi, 1875–1975. ca. 1978. Paperback. ISBN 0-919642-83-7 (also ISBN 0-919642-82-9). DDC: 333.73096897. LCC: HD997.
- Kenneth O. Hall: Imperial Proconsul (Sir Hercules Robinson and South Africa 1881–1889, Modern Africa #3). 1980. Hardcover. ISBN 0-919642-89-6.
- A. J. Christopher: The Crown Lands of British South Africa, 1853–1914. 1984. ISBN 0-919642-04-7. DDC: 333.10968. LCC: HD991.

== Books on other topics ==
- Lanny B. Fields: Tso Tsung-t’ang and the Muslims: Statecraft in Northwest China, 1868–1880. 1978. ISBN 0-919642-85-3. DDC: 951.030924. LCC: DS760.9
- N. T. Mirov: The Road I Came: The Memoirs of a Russian-American Forester. 1978. ISBN 0-919642-84-5. DDC: 634.90924. LCC: SD129
- Marion E. Meyer: The Jews of Kingston: A Microcosm of Canadian Jewry? ca. 1983. ISBN 0-919642-00-4. DDC: 971.372004924. LCC: F1059.5
- C. M. D. Crowder (ed.): Unity, Heresy and Reform, 1378–1460: The Conciliar Response to the Great Schism. ca. 1986. ISBN 0-919642-10-1. DDC: 262.52
- J. L. Black and D. K. Buse: G.-F. Müller and Siberia, 1733–1743. Translation of German materials by Victoria Joan Moessner. 1989. ISBN 0-919642-23-3. DDC: 915.7047. LCC: DK754.
