= List of American Eastern Orthodox saints =

This is a list of American Eastern Orthodox saints.

== List ==
For saints who were not born in and did not die in the territory of America, a note has been added detailing their connection to the country.

Image	Name	Born	Died	Feast Day	Canonization	Notes
	Alexander Hotovitzky	February 11, 1872 in Kremenetz, Volhynia, Russia	August 19, 1937 in Moscow, Russia	December 4	December 4, 1994	Worked as a priest in the United States before returning to Russia in 1914.
	Alexei Kabalyuk	September 1, 1877 in Transcarpathia	December 2, 1947 in Transcarpathia	December 2	November 1, 2001	Served as a priest in the United States in the 1940s
	Alexis of Wilkes-Barre	March 18, 1854 in the Austrian Empire	May 7, 1909 in Wilkes-Barre, Pennsylvania, United States	May 7	May 29-30, 1994 by the Orthodox Church in America	
	Anatoly (Kamensky)	October 3, 1863, Samara, Russian Empire	c. September 20, 1925 in the Soviet Union	September 20	Russian Orthodox Church	Headed a missionary school in Minnesota.
	Bogolyub Gakovich	Unknown	1941 in the Jadovno concentration camp		2004	Worked as a priest in the United States 1930s.
	Bazyli Martysz	February 20, 1874 in Poland	May 4, 1945 in Poland	May 4	June 7-8, 2003	Served as a priest in the United States from 1900 to 1912.
	Herman of Alaska	Around 1756-1760 in Serpukhov, Russia	November 15, 1837 in Spruce Island, Alaska	August 9	August 9th, 1970 by both the Orthodox Church In America and the Russian Orthodox Church Outside of Russia	
	Innocent of Alaska	September 6 [O.S. August 26] 1797 in Anginskoye, Irkutsk Governorate, Russian Empire	April 12 [O.S. March 31] 1879 in Moscow, Russia	October 6 (glorification) and March 31 (repose)	October 6, 1977 by the Russian Orthodox Church	Served as a prominent missionary to Alaska and was a bishop of these areas.
	Jacob Netsvetov	1802 in Atka Island, Aleutian Islands, Russian Alaska	July 26, 1864 in New Archangel (Sitka), Russian Alaska	July 26	October 15-16, 1994 by the Orthodox Church in America	
	John Kochurov	July 13, 1871 in Bigildino-Surky, Ryazan, Russia	October 31, 1917 in Tsarskoye Selo, Russia	October 31	December 3-4, 1994 by the Russian Orthodox Church.	Worked as a priest in the United States before returning to Russia in 1907.
	John Maximovitch	June 4, 1896 in Adamovka, Izyumsky Uyezd, Kharkov Governorate, Russian Empire	July 2, 1966 in Seattle, Washington, United States	July 2	July 2, 1994 by the Russian Orthodox Church Outside of Russia and July 2, 2008 by the Russian Orthodox Church.	
	Juvenaly of Alaska	c. 1761 in Nerchinsk, Siberia	c. 1796 in Quinahgak, Alaska	September 24	1980	
	Mardarije Uskokovich	December 22, 1889 in Kornet, Ljesani County, Montenegro	December 12, 1935 in Ann Arbor, Michigan, United States	December 12	May 29, 2015 by the Serbian Orthodox Church	
	Matej Stijačić	December 11, 1883 in Klobuk, Herzegovina	1941 in the Jadovno concentration camp		2004	Served as a parish priest in the US in the 1920s and 1930s.
	Nikolaj Velimirović	January 4, 1881 in Lelić, Serbia	March 18, 1956, United States	March 18 and May 3	May 19, 2003 by the Serbian Orthodox Church.	
	Olga of Alaska	February 3, 1916 in Kwethluk, Alaska	November 3rd, 1979 in Kwethluk, Alaska	October 27	June 19, 2025 by the Orthodox Church in America.	
	Peter the Aleut	Unknown, presumably in Alaska	1815 in California	September 24	1980 by the Russian Orthodox Church Outside of Russia and the Alaskan Diocese of the Orthodox Church in America.	
	Raphael of Brooklyn	1860 in Syria	February 14, 1915 in Brooklyn, New York	February 27	May 28-29, 2000 by the Orthodox Church in America.	
	Sebastian Dabovich	1863 in San Francisco, California	November 30, 1940 at the Žiča Monastery	November 30	September 5, 2015 by the Serbian Orthodox Church.	
	Seraphim (Samoylovich) of Uglich	July 19, 1881 in Myrgorod, Poltava, Russian Empire	November 4, 1937 in the Soviet Union	November 4	August 2000, by the Russian Orthodox Church	Worked as a priest in America.
	Tikhon of Moscow	December 19, 1865, Toropets, Russian Empire	April 7, 1925 in Moscow	October 9	October 9, 1989 by the Russian Orthodox Church	Worked as a bishop in the United States.
	Varnava Nastić	January 31, 1914 in Gary, Indiana	November 12, 1964, Serbia	November 12	May 15, 2005, by the Serbian Orthodox Church	

== See also ==
- List of Eastern Orthodox saint titles
- List of Eastern Orthodox saints
- List of Russian saints

== Sources ==
- Parts of the page are derived with permission from List of American saints at OrthodoxWiki.
