= Lydia T. Black =

American anthropologist (1925–2007)

- Born: December 16, 1925; Kiev, Ukrainian SSR, Soviet Union
- Died: March 12, 2007 (aged 81); Kodiak, Alaska, U.S.
- Resting place: Kodiak City Cemetery
- Education: Brandeis University (B.A., M.A., 1971); University of Massachusetts Amherst (Ph.D., 1973)
- Occupations: Anthropologist, professor, translator
- Notable work: Russians in Tlingit America
- Spouse: Igor Black

Lydia T. Black (Russian: Лидия Сергеевна Блэк, romanized: Lidiya Sergeyevna Blek; December 16, 1925 – March 12, 2007) was an American anthropologist. She won an American Book Award for Russians in Tlingit America: The Battles of Sitka, 1802 And 1804. She also received a Historian of the Year award from the Alaska Historical Society.

== Life ==
She grew up in Kiev in the Ukrainian SSR. Her father was executed in 1933, and her mother died of tuberculosis in 1941. During World War II, she was sent to a German forced labor camp. After the war, in Munich, she was a janitor. She was enlisted by the Americans as a translator, at the United Nations Relief and Rehabilitation Administration displaced children's camp, since she could speak six languages. She married Igor Black, and immigrated in 1950.

She graduated from Brandeis University with a B.A., and M.A. in 1971, and University of Massachusetts Amherst with a Ph.D. in 1973. She taught at Providence College beginning in 1973. She taught at the University of Alaska Fairbanks from 1984 to 1998. She worked translating and cataloging the Russian archives of Saint Herman's Orthodox Theological Seminary, earning the Cross of St. Herman. In April 2001, she, along with fellow anthropologist and historian and close colleague Richard Pierce, historians Barbara Sweetland Smith, John Middleton-Tidwell, and Viktor Petrov (posthumous), was decorated by the Russian Federation with the Order of Friendship Medal, which they received at the Russian consulate in San Francisco.

She is buried at Kodiak City Cemetery.

== Family ==
She married Igor A. Black (died 1969), an engineer for NASA contractors; they had four daughters.

== Works ==
- Russians in Alaska, 1732-1867. University of Alaska Press. 2004. ISBN 978-1-889963-04-4.
- Nora Dauenhauer; Richard Dauenhauer; Lydia Black, eds. (2008). Russians in Tlingit America. University of Washington Press. ISBN 978-0-295-98601-2.
- The journals of Iakov Netsvetov: the Yukon years, 1845-1863. Translated by Lydia T. Black. The Limestone Press. 1984. ISBN 978-0-919642-01-0.
