= List of Eastern Orthodox universities and colleges in the United States =

There are several Eastern Orthodox colleges and universities in the United States. This includes seminaries. There are also a number of distance education programs affiliated with Eastern Orthodox churches in North America, and blended residency and online certification programs in theology or ministry.

Orthodox education has existed in North America since Russian colonization of Alaska in the late 18th Century, but has only existed in the United States since the early 20th Century.

== Accreditation ==
Accreditation of Orthodox institutes of higher learning in the United States is not uniform. For example, Saint Herman's Orthodox Seminary of Alaska lost its accreditation as an institution of higher education in the 1990s, and now works under state authorization as an exempted religious institution.

== Universities and colleges ==
Major colleges or universities that are or have been affiliated with Eastern Orthodoxy:

- Hellenic College - Brookline, Massachusetts; Greek Orthodox Archdiocese of America. The institution also has within it a seminary.

=== Defunct ===
- University of Saint Katherine - San Marcos, California; active 2010–2024.

== Seminaries ==
- Christ the Saviour Carpatho-Russian Seminary - Johnstown, Pennsylvania; American Carpatho-Russian Orthodox Diocese.
- Holy Cross Greek Orthodox School of Theology - Brookline, Massachusetts; Greek Orthodox Archdiocese of America. The institution also has within it a college.
- Holy Trinity Orthodox Seminary - Jordanville, New York; Russian Orthodox Church Outside Russia.
- Saint Herman's Orthodox Theological Seminary - Kodiak, Alaska; Diocese of Alaska, Orthodox Church in America.
- Saint Sava Serbian Orthodox Seminary - Libertyville, Illinois; Serbian Orthodox Church in North and South America.
- St. Sophia Ukrainian Orthodox Theological Seminary - South Bound Brook, New Jersey; Ukrainian Orthodox Church of the USA.
- Saint Tikhon's Orthodox Theological Seminary - South Canaan, Pennsylvania; Orthodox Church in America.
- Saint Vladimir's Orthodox Theological Seminary - Yonkers, New York; Orthodox Church in America.

== Distance (Online) Education ==
These are distance or online education programs that are not affiliated with any other listed institutions:

- Great Martyr Euphemia Orthodox Theological Academy
- St. Gregory Nazianzen Orthodox Theological Institute - Ecumenical Patriarchate
- St. Stephen's Course in Orthodox Theology - Antiochian Orthodox Christian Archdiocese of North America
- The Pastoral School of the Diocese of Chicago and Mid-America of the Russian Orthodox Church Outside of Russia offers diplomas in Pastoral Theology and Orthodox Studies.
- The Pavel Florensky School of Theology and Ministry - An academic unit within the Euclid University Consortium. The Master's Degree in Orthodox Theology and Doctoral / Ph.D. programs are administered by a priest of the Ukrainian Orthodox Church of the USA (Patriarchate of Constantinople).

== Other ==
This category includes educational institutions that are not standard seminaries nor major colleges or universities:

- St. Athanasius Academy of Orthodox Theology - Elk Grove, California; Antiochian Orthodox Christian Archdiocese of North America.
- St. Athanasius College - Katy, Texas; Antiochian Orthodox Christian Archdiocese of North America.
- Saint Constantine College - Houston, Texas; Pan-Orthodox
- The Antiochian House of Studies - La Verne, California; Antiochian Orthodox Christian Archdiocese of North America.
- The Patriarch Athenagoras Orthodox Institute - Berkeley, California; Ecumenical Patriarchate of Constantinople.

== Traditionalist Orthodox institutions ==
- St. Photios Orthodox Theological Seminary - Etna, California; "Genuine Orthodox Church"
