= Bolotov =

Bolotov is a Russian surname, and may refer to:

- Andrey Bolotov (1738–1833), Russian agriculturist
- Joasaph Bolotov (1761–1799), Bishop of Kodiak
- Valery Bolotov (1970–2017), Ukrainian militant leader involved in the War in Donbas
- 7858 Bolotov (1978 SB3), a main-belt asteroid discovered on September 26, 1978
