= Dauenhauer =

Dauenhauer is a surname. Notable people with the surname include:

- Nora Marks Dauenhauer (1927–2017), American poet, writer, and scholar
- Paul Dauenhauer (born 1980), American engineer and inventor
- Richard Dauenhauer (1942–2014), American poet and translator
