= Herman of Alaska =

Russian Orthodox monk and saint (c. 1736 – 1837)

Saint Herman of Alaska
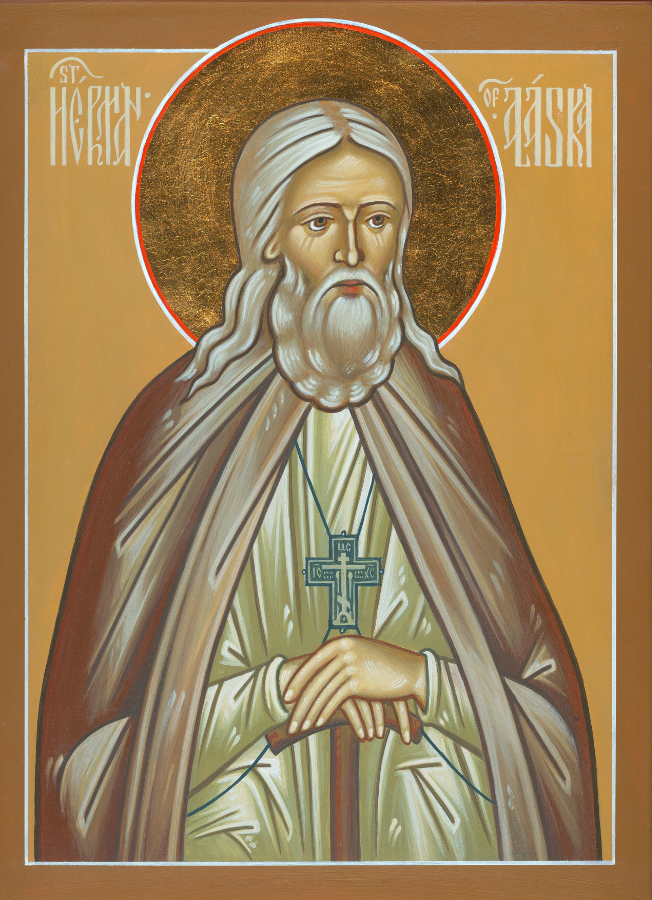
- Icon of Herman

Venerable, Wonderworker
- Born: c. AD 1756; Serpukhov or Voronezh Governorate, Russia
- Died: 27 November, AD 1837; Spruce Island, Russian Alaska
- Venerated in: Eastern Orthodox Church; Anglican Communion
- Canonized: August 9, 1970, Kodiak, Alaska by the Holy Synod of the Orthodox Church in America (OCA), and simultaneously in San Francisco by the Russian Orthodox Church Outside of Russia (ROCOR)
- Major shrine: Holy Resurrection Cathedral, Kodiak, Alaska (relics); Sts. Sergius and Herman of Valaam Chapel, Spruce Island, Alaska (burial site)
- Feast: August 9 (glorification); December 13 (repose); November 15 (repose-alternate)
- Attributes: Clothed as a monk, with a flowing white beard; sometimes wearing a wrought iron cross and chains about his chest.
- Patronage: Americas

Herman of Alaska (Russian: Герман Аляскинский, romanized: German Alaskinsky; c. 1756 – 27 November [O.S. 15 November] 1837) was a Russian Orthodox monk and missionary to Alaska, which was then part of Russian America. He was the first saint of North America to be canonized by the Orthodox Church.

== Early life ==
Biographers disagree about Herman's early life. His official biography, which Valaam Monastery published in 1867, said that his pre-monastic name was unknown, but that Herman was born into a merchant's family in Serpukhov, a city in Moscow Governorate. He was said to later become a novice at the Trinity-St. Sergius Hermitage near St. Petersburg before going to Valaam to complete his training and receive full tonsure as a monk. But, modern biographer Sergei Korsun found this account to be based on erroneous information provided by Semyon Yanovsky, an administrator from 1818 through part of 1820 of the Russian-American Company (RAC) in Alaska. He confused Herman's biographical information with that of another monk, Joseph (Telepnev).

Another former RAC Chief Manager, Ferdinand von Wrangel, stated Herman was originally from a prosperous peasant family in the Voronezh Governorate and served in the military. He then entered monastic life as a novice at Sarov Monastery. This concurred with testimony of Archimandrite Theophan (Sokolov), and a letter written by Herman himself. These agree that Herman began his monastic life as a novice at Sarov, and later received the full tonsure at Valaam. A young military clerk named Egor Ivanovich Popov, from the Voronezh Governorate, was tonsured with the name 'Herman' at Valaam in 1782.

All biographers agree that at Valaam, Herman studied under Abbot Nazarius, previously of Sarov Monastery. The abbot had been influenced by the hesychastic tradition of Paisius Velichkovsky. Herman undertook various obediences and was well-liked by the brethren, but wanted a more solitary life. He became a hermit with Abbot Nazarius' blessing. His hermitage, which later became known as "Herman's field" or Germanovo, was two kilometers from the monastery. Metropolitan Gabriel of St. Petersburg offered to ordain Herman to the priesthood and twice offered to send him to lead the Russian Orthodox Mission in China, but he refused, preferring the solitary life and remaining a simple monk. Years after he left for North America, Herman continued to keep in touch with his spiritual home. In a letter to Abbot Nazarius, he wrote, "in my mind I imagine my beloved Valaam, and constantly behold it across the great ocean."

== Mission in Alaska ==
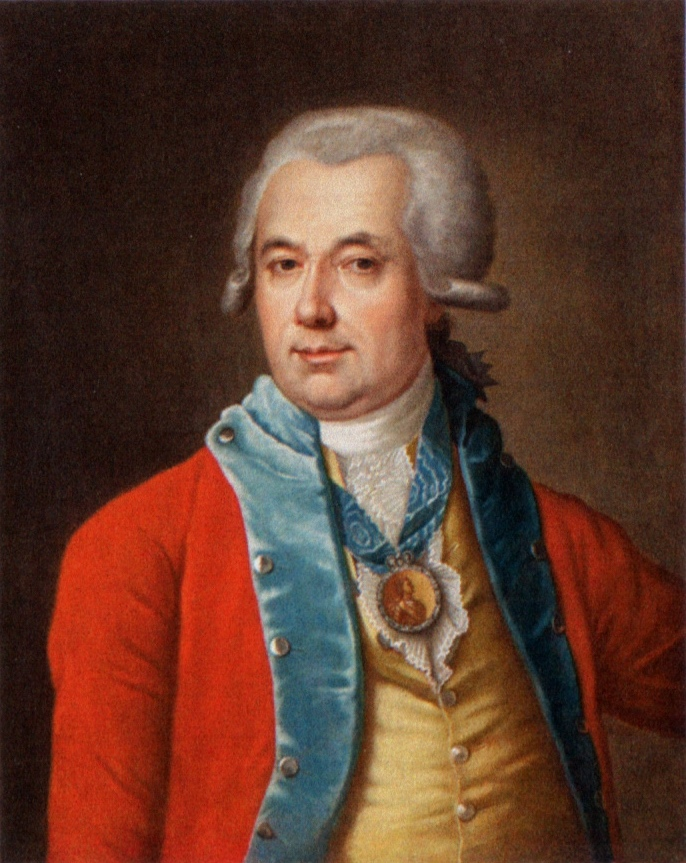
Grigory Shelikhov, the founder of the Kodiak Island settlement, invited the first Russian Orthodox missionaries to the New World.

The Russian colonization of the Americas began when Vitus Bering and Aleksei Chirikov discovered Alaska on behalf of the Russian Empire in 1741. The expedition harvested 1,500 sea otter pelts, which Chinese merchants bought for 1,000 rubles apiece at their trading post near Lake Baikal. This spurred a "fur rush" from 1741 to 1798 in which frontiersmen known as promyshlenniki explored Alaska and the Aleutian Islands. They alternately fought with and intermarried the native peoples.

Grigory Shelikhov, a fur-trader, subjugated the native population of Kodiak Island. With Ivan Golikov, he founded a fur-trading company that eventually received a monopoly from the Imperial government; it became known as the Russian-American Company. Shelikhov founded a school for the natives, and many were converted to Russian Orthodox Christianity.

The Shelikhov-Golikov Company appealed to the Most Holy Synod of the Russian Orthodox Church to provide a priest for the natives. Catherine the Great decided instead to send an entire mission to America. She entrusted the task of recruiting missionaries to Metropolitan Gabriel of St. Petersburg, who sent ten monks from Valaam, including Herman. The missionaries arrived on Kodiak on September 24, 1794.

Herman and the other missionaries encountered a harsh reality at Kodiak that did not correspond to Shelikhov's rosy descriptions. The native Kodiak population, called "Americans" by the Russian settlers, were subject to harsh treatment by the Russian-American Company, which was being overseen by Shelikhov's manager Alexander Baranov, who later became the first governor of the colony.

The men were forced to hunt for sea otter even during harsh weather, and women and children were abused. The monks were also shocked at the widespread alcoholism in the Russian population, and the fact that most of the settlers had taken native mistresses. The monks themselves were not given the supplies that Shelikhov promised them, and had to till the ground with wooden implements.

Despite these difficulties, the monks baptized more than 7,000 natives in the Kodiak region, and set about building a church and monastery. Herman was assigned in the bakery and acted as the mission's steward (ekonom).

The monks became the defenders of the native Kodiak population. Herman was especially noted for his zeal in protecting them from the excessive demands of the RAC, and Baranov disparaged him in a letter as a "hack writer and chatterer." A contemporary historian compares him to Bartolomé de las Casas, the Roman Catholic friar who defended the rights of native South Americans against the Spanish colonists.

After over a decade spent in Alaska, Herman became the head of the mission in 1807, although he was not ordained to the priesthood. The local population loved and respected him, and he had established good relations with Baranov. Herman ran the mission school, where he taught church subjects such as singing and catechism, alongside reading and writing. He also taught agriculture on Spruce Island. But, because he still longed for the life of a hermit, he retired from active duty in the mission and moved to Spruce Island.

== Life on Spruce Island ==
Herman moved to Spruce Island around 1811 to 1817. The island is separated from Kodiak by a mile-wide strait, making it ideal for eremitic life. Herman named his hermitage "New Valaam." He wore simple clothes and slept on a bench covered with a deerskin. When asked how he could bear to be alone in the forest, he replied, "I am not alone. God is here, as God is everywhere."

Despite his solitary life, he soon gained a following. He received many visitors—especially native Alutiiq —on Sundays and church feasts. Soon a chapel and guesthouse were built next to his hermitage, and then a school for orphans. Herman had a few disciples, including the Creole orphan Gerasim Ivanovich Zyrianov, a young Aleut woman named Sofia Vlasova, and others.

Entire families moved to the island in order to be closer to the Elder, who helped to sort out their disputes. Herman had a deep love for the native Aleuts: he stood up for them against the excesses of the Russian-American Company, and once during an epidemic, he was the only Russian to visit them, working tirelessly to care for the sick and console the dying. Herman spent the rest of his life on Spruce Island, where he died on November 15, 1837.

== Sainthood and legacy ==
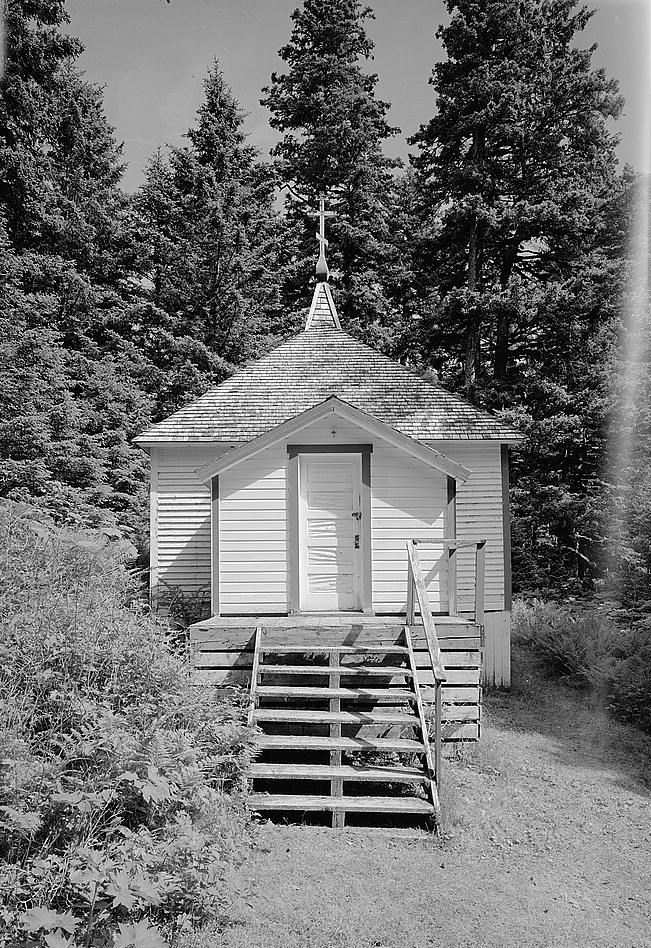
Saints Sergius and Herman of Valaam Chapel, built in 1898 over the site where Herman was buried on Spruce Island in December 1836. Located near Monk's Lagoon, in the immediate vicinity of St. Herman's hermitage.

=== Canonization ===
On March 11, 1969, the bishops of the Orthodox Church in America (OCA) formally declared their intention to canonize Herman "as a sublime example of the Holy Life, for our spiritual benefit, inspiration, comfort, and the confirmation of our Faith." On August 9, 1970, Metropolitan Ireney (Bekish) of the OCA along with Archbishop Paul (Olmari) of Finland and other hierarchs and clergy presided over the canonization service, which was held at Holy Resurrection Cathedral on Kodiak Island. His relics were transferred from his grave underneath the Sts. Sergius and Herman of Valaam Chapel (i.e., the Saints Sergius and Herman of Valaam Chapel), on Spruce Island, to the Holy Resurrection Cathedral.

On the same date, the bishops of the Russian Orthodox Church Outside of Russia (ROCOR) also canonized Herman at the Holy Virgin Cathedral ("Joy of All Who Sorrow") in San Francisco. At the all-night vigil, the canon to Herman was read for the first time by Gleb Podmoshensky, one of the founding brothers of the St. Herman of Alaska Serbian Orthodox Brotherhood in 1963. He, Eugene (Seraphim) Rose, and Lawrence Campbell gathered material for the Synod of Bishops in order to support the glorification of Herman, and also helped compose the liturgical service in his honor.

=== Feast days ===
There are several feast days throughout the year on which Saint Herman of Alaska is commemorated. Since there are two different calendars currently in use among various Orthodox churches, two dates are listed: the first date is the date on both the Revised Julian Calendar and the traditional Julian Calendar, the second date, after the slash, is the same day on the date on the more contemporary Gregorian Calendar date for the Julian Calendar date.

- July 27/August 9—Glorification: This is the anniversary of the joint-glorification (canonization) of Herman of Alaska as a saint in 1970.
- November 15/28—Repose: This is the anniversary of the actual death of Herman.
- December 13/26—Repose: Due to an error in recordkeeping, this was originally thought to be the day of Herman's death, and because of the long-established tradition of celebrating his memory on this day, it has remained a feast day. It is more likely that this is the day he was buried. For those Orthodox Christians who follow the Julian Calendar, this day falls on December 26 of the Gregorian Calendar.
- Second Sunday after Pentecost: as one of the saints commemorated on the Synaxis of the Saints of North America—this is a moveable feast of the ecclesiastical year, and the date of its observance will change from year to year.

In 2022, Herman was officially added to the Episcopal Church liturgical calendar with a feast day on 15 November.

=== Relics and legacy ===
The major portion of his relics are preserved at Holy Resurrection Cathedral in Kodiak, Alaska, His burial site at the Sts. Sergius and Herman Chapel, Spruce Island, Alaska is an important pilgrimage site. The devout will often take soil from his grave and water from the spring named in his honor.

A portion of his relics are enshrined at the St. Ignatius Chapel at the Antiochan Village in Pennsylvania, a conference and retreat center of the Antiochian Orthodox Christian Archdiocese of North America. He is regarded as one of their patron saints.

In 1963, with the blessing of John Maximovitch, Archbishop of Shanghai and San Francisco, a community of Orthodox booksellers and publishers called the St. Herman of Alaska Brotherhood was formed to publish Orthodox missionary information in English.

One of the founders was Father Seraphim Rose. The Brotherhood did much to advance the cause of Herman's glorification as a saint. Saint Herman's Orthodox Theological Seminary in Kodiak, Alaska is named in his honor, as are numerous parish churches throughout the world.

On Tuesday, August 4, 1970, the 91st Congress of the United States acknowledged the glorification of Herman of Alaska with a speech in the Senate, and his biography was formally entered into the Congressional Record.

In 1993, Patriarch Alexis II visited Kodiak to venerate the relics of Saint Herman. He left as a gift an ornate lampada (oil lamp) which burns constantly over the reliquary. Pilgrims from all over the world are anointed with holy oil from this lampada.

Finnish Orthodox Espoo Church in Tapiola, Espoo, is dedicated to St. Herman of Alaska.

== See also ==
- List of American Eastern Orthodox saints
- Peter the Aleut
