= Innocent of Alaska =

Russian bishop and saint (1797–1879)

Saint Innocent of Alaska
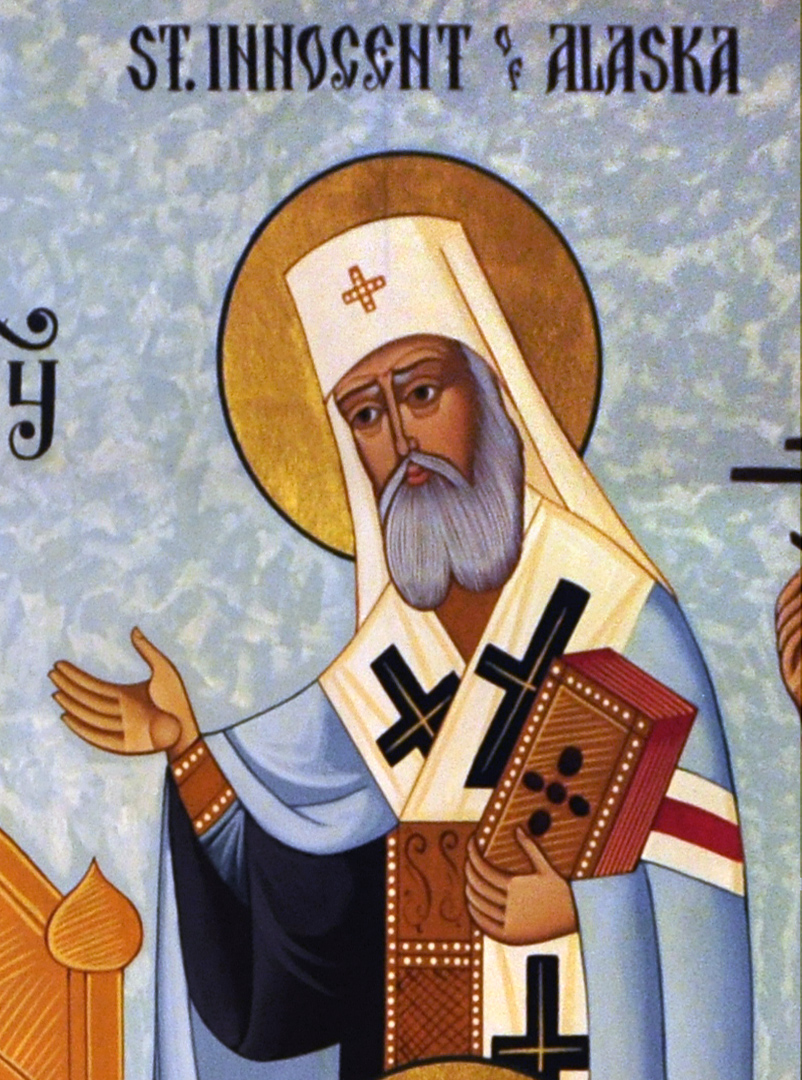

Enlightener of Alaska and Siberia
- Born: 6 September [O.S. 26 August] 1797; Anginskoye, Irkutsk Governorate, Russian Empire
- Died: 12 April [O.S. 31 March] 1879 (aged 81); Moscow, Russian Empire
- Venerated in: Eastern Orthodox Church; Anglican Communion
- Canonized: 6 October [O.S. 23 September] 1977, Moscow by Patriarch Pimen I, Russian Orthodox Church
- Major shrine: Trinity-St. Sergius Lavra
- Feast: 13 April (as of the 21st century where the Julian calendar is in use) [O.S. 31 March] (repose); 6 October (Glorification); 30 March (Anglican Communion)
- Attributes: Vested as a bishop, with a moderately long black beard, holding a Gospel Book or scroll

Innocent of Alaska
- Metropolitan and archbishop of Moscow
- Church: Russian Orthodox Church
- See: Moscow
- Installed: 1867
- Term ended: 1879
- Predecessor: Philaret Drozdov
- Successor: Macarius Bulgakov

Innocent of Alaska (Russian: Иннокентий; August 26, 1797 – 12 April [O.S. 31 March] 1879), also known as Innocent Metropolitan of Moscow, was a Russian Orthodox missionary priest, then the first Orthodox bishop and archbishop in the Americas, and finally the Metropolitan of Moscow and Kolomna. Remembered for his missionary work, scholarship, and leadership in Alaska and the Russian Far East during the 19th century, he is known for his abilities as a scholar, linguist, and administrator, as well as his great zeal for his work.

As a missionary priest he took his wife and family with him. In these territories he learned several languages and dialects of the indigenous peoples. He wrote many of the earliest scholarly works about the native peoples of Alaska, including dictionaries and grammars for their languages for which he devised writing systems; also, he wrote religious works in, and translated parts of the Bible into, several of these languages. His books were published beginning in 1840.

== Early life and education ==
Innocent was born Ivan Evseyevich Popov (Иван Евсеевич Попов) on August 26, 1797, into the family of a church server in the village of Anginskoye, Verkholensk District, Irkutsk Governorate, in Russia. His father, Evsey Popov, died when Ivan was six, and Ivan lived with his uncle, the parish deacon, in Anga.

In 1807 at age 10, Ivan entered the Irkutsk Theological Seminary, where the rector renamed him Veniaminov in honor of the recently deceased Bishop Veniamin of Irkutsk.

In 1817 he married a local priest's daughter named Catherine. On May 18 that year Ivan Veniaminov was ordained a deacon of the Church of the Annunciation in Irkutsk.

After completing his studies in 1818, Veniaminov was appointed a teacher in a parish school. On May 18, 1821 he was ordained a priest to serve in the Church of the Annunciation in Irkutsk. In Russian he was known as Father Ioann, the religious version of Ivan.

== Ministry in Alaska ==
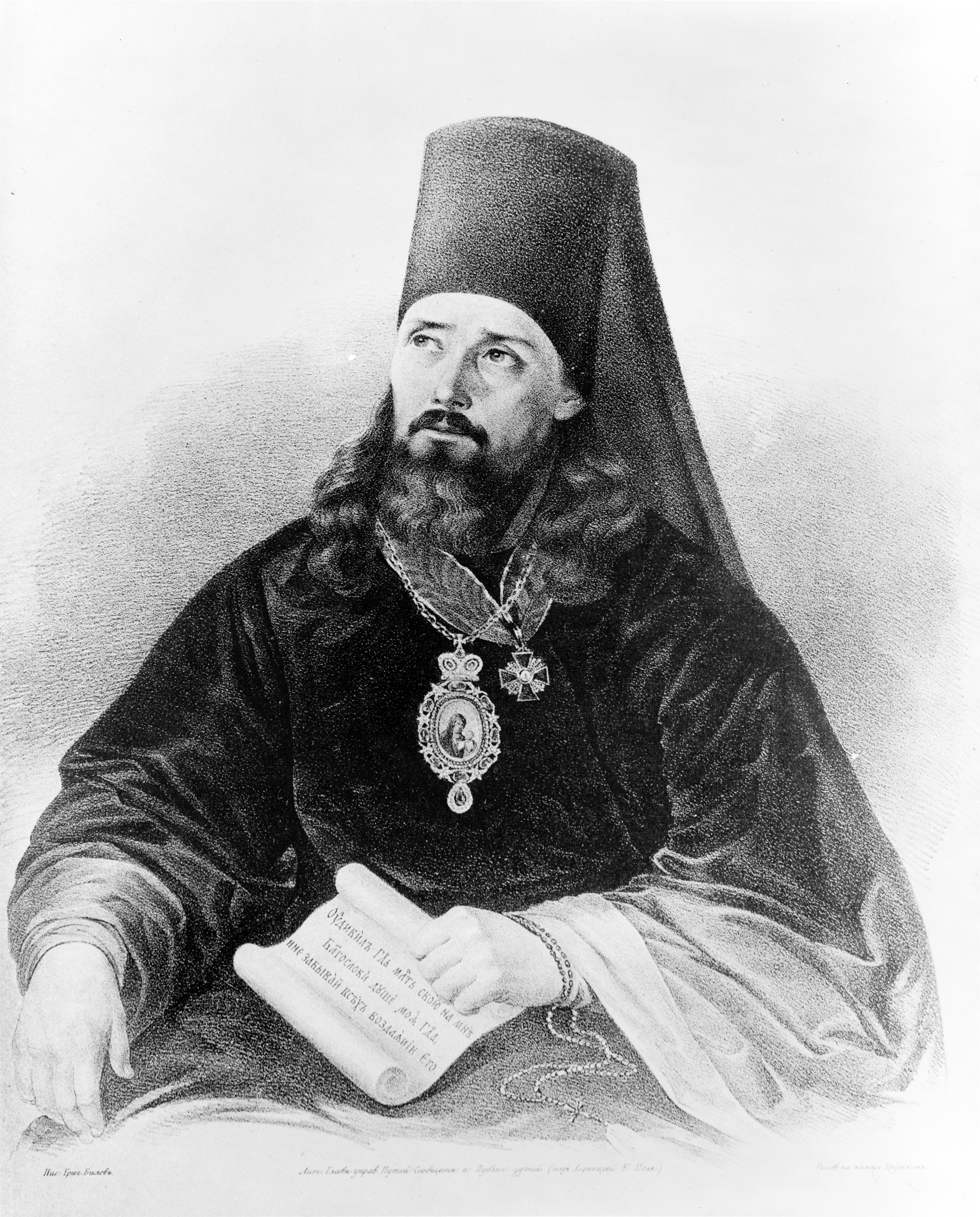
Contemporary portrait of Bishop Innocent.

At the beginning of 1823, Bishop Michael of Irkutsk received instructions to send a priest to the island of Unalaska in the Aleutian Islands of Alaska. Father Ioann Veniaminov volunteered to go and on May 7, 1823, he departed from Irkutsk, accompanied by his aging mother, his brother Stefan, his wife, and their son, Innocent, an infant. After a difficult yearlong journey by land and water, they arrived at Unalaska on July 29, 1824.

After Father Ioann and his family built and moved into an earthen hut, he set about studying the local languages and dialects. He trained some of his new parishioners in Russian building techniques. With them he undertook the construction of Holy Ascension Church, which was finished the following July.

Father Ioann's parish included the island of Unalaska and the neighboring groups of Fox and Pribilof islands, occupied by indigenous people who had been converted to Christianity before his arrival. They also retained many of their earlier religious beliefs and customs. Father Ioann often traveled between the islands in a canoe, battling the stormy ocean in the Gulf of Alaska.

By his travels through the islands, Father Ioann Veniaminov became familiar with the local dialects. In a short time he mastered six of the dialects. He devised an alphabet using Cyrillic letters for the most widely used dialect, the Unangan dialect of Aleut. In 1828, he translated portions of the Bible and other church material into that dialect. In 1829, he journeyed to the Bering Sea coast of the Alaskan mainland and preached to the people there.

In 1834, Father Ioann was transferred to Sitka Island, to the town of Novoarkhangelsk, later called Sitka. He devoted himself to the Tlingit people and studied their language and customs. From his studies there, he wrote the scholarly works Notes on the Kolushchan and Kodiak Tongues and Other Dialects of the Russo-American Territories, with a Russian-Kolushchan Glossary.

In 1836, Father Veniaminov made the journey south on a pastoral tour of the southernmost extent of Russian America, landing at Fort Ross in Northern California. While there he conducted a census and performed the sacraments of marriage and baptism for the Russian population and local natives.

== Kamchatka ministry ==
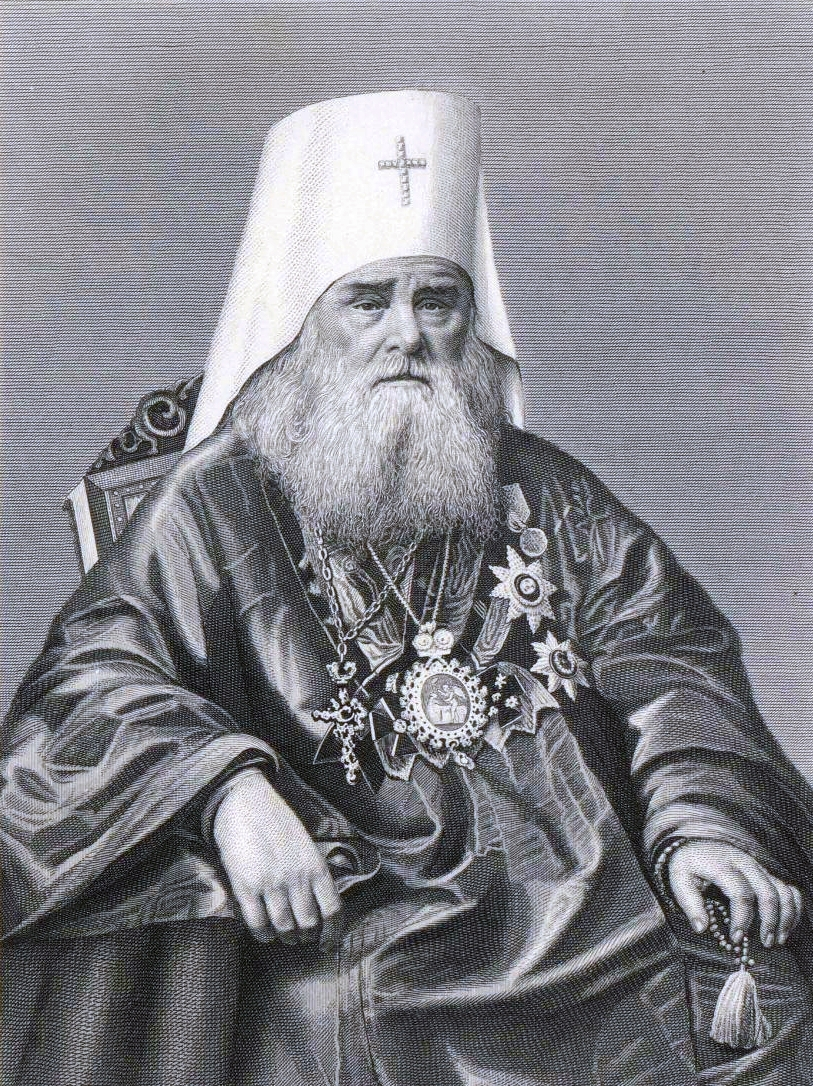
Innocent as Metropolitan of Moscow.

In 1838, Father Ioann journeyed to St. Petersburg (where on Christmas Day 1839 he was promoted to archpriest), Moscow and Kiev to report on his activities and request an expansion of the Church's activities in Russian America. While he was there, he received notice that his wife had died during her visit to Irkutsk. He requested permission to return to his hometown. Instead, church officials suggested that he take vows as a monk. Father Ioann at first ignored these suggestions, but, on November 29, 1840, he was tonsured a monk with the name Innocent in honor of Saint Innocent, the first bishop of Irkutsk (†1731, commemorated on November 26). He was elevated to the rank of Archimandrite.

On December 15, 1840, Archimandrite Innocent was consecrated Bishop of Kamchatka and Kuril Islands in Russia and the Aleutian Islands in Russian America. His see was located in Novoarkhangelsk (Sitka), to which he returned in September 1841. He spent the next nine years administering his diocese as well as taking several long missionary journeys to its remote areas.

On April 21, 1850, Bishop Innocent was elevated to archbishop. In 1852 the Yakut area was admitted to the Kamchatka Diocese. In September 1853 Archbishop Innocent took up permanent residence in the town of Yakutsk. Innocent took frequent trips throughout his enlarged diocese. He devoted much energy to the translation of the scriptures and service books into the Yakut (Sakha) language.

In April 1865 Archbishop Innocent was appointed a member of the Holy Governing Synod of the Russian Orthodox Church.

== Metropolitan of Moscow ==
On November 19, 1867, he was appointed the Metropolitan of Moscow, succeeding his friend and mentor, Filaret, who had died. As metropolitan, he undertook revisions of many church texts that contained errors, raised funds to improve the living conditions of impoverished priests, and established a retirement home for clergy.

== Death and legacy ==
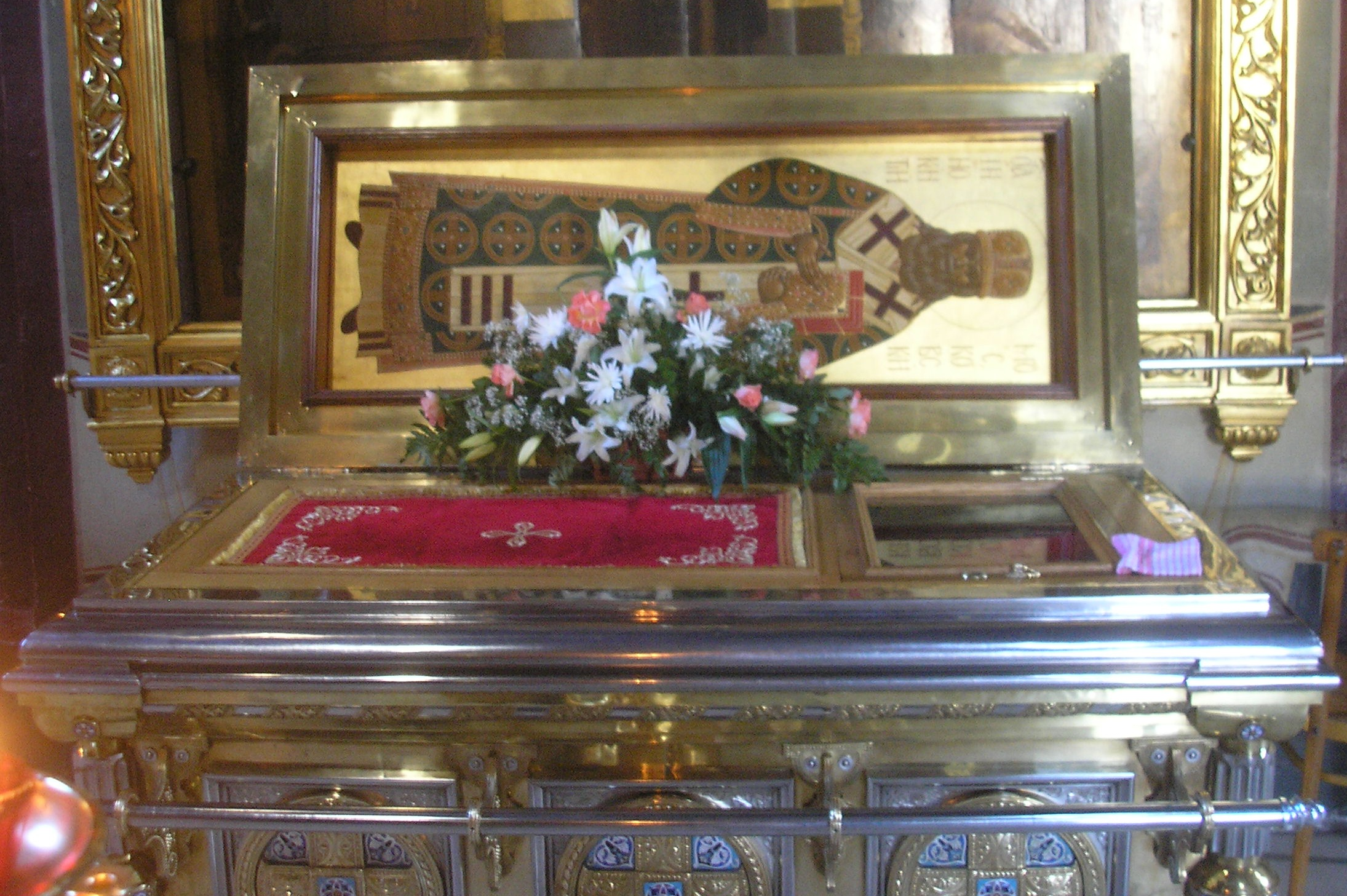
The relics of Saint Innocent of Alaska (reliquary/coffin below and his icon on the opened lid above) in the Assumption Cathedral of the Trinity Lavra of St. Sergius in Sergiyev Posad, Russia

Innocent died on March 31, 1879. He was buried on April 5, 1879, at the Trinity Lavra of St. Sergius, outside Moscow.

== Sainthood ==
On 6 October [O.S. 23 September] 1977 the Russian Orthodox Church, acting on the official request of the Orthodox Church in America, glorified (canonized) Innocent as a saint, giving him the title "Enlightener of the Aleuts, Apostle to America."

Innocent's feast day is celebrated by the Orthodox Church three times a year: March 31, the date of his repose according to the Julian Calendar (April 13 N.S.); October 6, the anniversary of his canonization (September 23 O.S.); and October 18, the Synaxis of the Moscow Hierarchs (October 5 O.S.).

Innocent is widely venerated with the epithet Equal-to-apostles as the Orthodox apostle of America.

On the liturgical calendar of the Episcopal Church (USA), Innocent is honored with a feast day on March 30.

== Works ==
=== In Aleut language ===
- "Indication of the Pathway into the Kingdom of Heaven" (PDF) (1899 ed.). Moscow: Synodal Printing Press. 1840. Archived from the original (PDF) on 4 April 2018.
- Innocent Veniaminov; Jacob Netsvetov (1840). "Beginnings of Christian Teaching and Short Christian Catechism" (PDF) (1893 ed.). Saint Petersburg: Synodal Printing Press. Archived from the original (PDF) on 16 November 2017.
- "Two Sermons from Saint Nicholas Church in Atka" (PDF) (Manuscript). Atka. 1842. Archived from the original (PDF) on 28 August 2017.
- "The Holy Gospel According to St. Matthew (translation)" (PDF) (1896 ed.). Saint Petersburg: Synodal Printing Press. 1840. Archived from the original (PDF) on 10 April 2018.

=== In Russian ===
- "Указание Пути в Царствие Небесное".
- Записки об островах Уналашкинского отдела. СПб. 1840.
  - Часть I, географическая
  - Часть II, этнографическая. Замечания об алеутах. М.: ЛИБРОКОМ. 2011. p. 336.
  - Часть III, Записки об атхинских алеутах и колошах (колюжах, тлинкитах). М.: УРСС. 2011. p. 160.
- Автобиографическая записка. М. 1886.
- Речь Архимандрита Иннокентия, по наречении его Епископом Камчатским, Курильским и Алеутским, сказанная 1840 года, Декабря 13 дня. СПб.: Христианское чтение. 1841.
- И. Барсуков (1897–1901). Письма (1823—1878 гг.). Vol. 3. СПб.
- И. Барсуков (1886–1888). Творения. Vol. 3. М.
- Слово при вступлении в управление московской паствою Высокопреосвященного Иннокентия Митрополита Московского, говоренное в большом Успенском соборе, 26-го мая, 1868 года. Vol. 26. М.: Православное обозрение. 1868.
- Указание пути в Царствие небесное. М. 1871.
- Наставление высокопреосвященного Иннокентия, бывшего архиепископа Камчатского, Курильского и Алеутского, Нушагакскому миссионеру иеромонаху Феофилу. СПб.: Церковные ведомости. 1900.
- "Русская Церковь и дружба между народами". Журнал Московской Патриархии (11): 50. 1959.

=== In English ===
- Veniaminov, Innocent (2013). Indication of the Way into the Kingdom of Heaven: An Introduction to Christian Life. Holy Trinity Publications. ISBN 9780884653035.

== See also ==
- List of American Eastern Orthodox saints
- Russian colonization of the Americas
- Jacob Netsvetov

== General and cited sources ==
- Garrett, Paul (1979). Saint Innocent, Apostle to America. Crestwood, New York: Saint Vladimir's Seminary Press.
- Kobtzeff, Oleg (1984). "Ruling Siberia: The Imperial Power, the Orthodox Church and the Native People". Siberica. II. British Siberian Studies Seminar: 6–15.

Eastern Orthodox Church titles
Preceded by Joasaph (Bolotov)	Primate of the Orthodox Church in America; 1840–68	Succeeded by Peter (Ekaterinovsky)
Preceded by St. Filaret	Metropolitan and archbishop of Moscow; 1868–79	Succeeded by Macarius I
