= Richard Pierce (historian) =

American historian (1918–2004)

- Born: Richard Austin Pierce; July 26, 1918; Manteca, California, U.S.
- Died: September 14, 2004 (aged 86); Kingston, Ontario, Canada
- Education: University of California, Berkeley
- Occupations: Historian; publisher

Richard Austin Pierce (July 26, 1918, Manteca, California – September 14, 2004, Kingston, Ontario) was an American historian and publisher who specialized in the Russian era of Alaska's history. He was involved in the publishing of more than 60 volumes on Alaska's history, in the capacity of author, translator, editor and publisher, and was considered one of the foremost authorities on Russian America.

== Life and career ==
Pierce was born in Manteca, California. He received his bachelor's degree in anthropology at the University of California, Berkeley, and then served as a sergeant in Europe in the United States Army during World War II.

After the war Pierce took a course in the Russian language in pursuit of a civil service job and then touring the region after World War II. He then returned to Berkeley and earned his master's degree in 1952 and his doctorate in 1956, both in history. He was awarded Fulbright fellowships in 1953 and 1954.

In the mid-1950s he travelled to Finland for the first time, in order to acquaint himself with the Slavica collection of the Helsinki University Library, which has one of the best collections of Russian literature and Russian journals outside of Russia and the former Soviet Union. During that first visit to Helsinki he met his wife to be, a native of Kingston upon Hull, working for Effoa, whom he married during the following winter. Effoa actually had a shipping line from Helsinki to Kingston upon Hull at that time. Incidentally, Pierce would later write an article on the founder of Effoa, Lars Krogius, as the latter had served as a captain on Russian-American Company ships from 1852 to 1863. Pierce and his wife were regular visitors to Finland since that time until their last visit in 2000.

Pierce was appointed a position at Queen's University, Kingston, Ontario in 1959 and served there until 1988. He then took a position at University of Alaska, Fairbanks from 1988 to 1998. During the latter tenure he had three homes, one in his native California, one in Kingston, and one in Fairbanks, the latter in the Rainey-Skarland Cabin, which has been "a veritable who's who of northern researchers including Ivar Skarland, Helge Larsen, J. Louis Giddings, Frederica de Laguna and Henry B. Collins and Otto W. Geist".

Some books, such as Voyage to America, 1783–1785 by Grigoriĭ Ivanovich Shelikhov (Alaska History no. 19, 1981), required decades of work. This book originated in 1958, with a letter received from Hector Chevigny, author of the popular Alaskan historical works Lost Empire, on N. P. Rezanov, and Lord of Alaska, on Alexander Andreyevich Baranov. Chevigny had planned to write yet a third book on another notable person in the history of Russian America, Grigoriĭ Shelikhov, until loss of eyesight forced him to lay the project aside. Pierce described his cooperation with Chevigny in the following way:

…we met, and an enjoyable and fruitful friendship followed. In frequent correspondence, and occasionally at the Chevigny apartment in Manhattan, we traded information and threshed out questions about all but forgotten people and events of early northwestern North America. This exchange so rekindled Hector's enthusiasm that he undertook another book, Russian America, 1741–1867, published shortly before his death in 1966.

Another book that was a result of decades of work was Pierce's Russian America, 1741–1867, A Biographical Dictionary, published in 1990 (Alaska History no. 33).

In April 2001, he along with fellow anthropologist and historian and close colleague Lydia T. Black, historians Barbara Sweetland Smith, John Middleton-Tidwell, and Viktor Petrov (posthumous), was decorated by the Russian Federation with the Order of Friendship Medal, which they received at the Russian consulate in San Francisco. "He was an absolute pioneer in Russian Alaska history, its premier archivist and one of its premier researchers and scholars", said Jennifer Collier, executive editor of the University of Alaska Press.

== The Limestone Press ==
In 1972 Pierce set up his one-man publishing house, which he gave the name The Limestone Press. He chose the name from the nickname of Kingston, Ontario, the "Limestone City", which has its origins in its many limestone buildings. He published mainly books on Alaska's history, but also on Ukrainian and African and other topics, as well as books dealing with Kingston's history.

== Original works ==
=== Books ===
- Russian Central Asia, 1867–1917: A Study in Colonial Rule. Series: Russian and East European studies. Berkeley: University of California Press, 1960. ISBN 978-0-520-01013-0.
- Soviet Central Asia: A Bibliography (1558–1966). Three volumes, 1: 1558–1866; 2: 1867–1917; 3: 1917–1966. Berkeley, California: Center for Slavic and East European Studies, University of California. 1966.
- Rezanov Reconnoiters California, 1806. A new translation of Nikolai Rezanov’s letter, parts of Lieutenant Khvostov's log of the ship Juno, and Dr. Georg von Langsdorff’s observations. Book Club of California, 1972. xix, 73 p. Printing: 50 copies.
- Alaskan Shipping, 1867–1878. Arrivals And Departures at the Port of Sitka. Materials for the Study of Alaska History no. 1. 1972. 72 pp., illustrated. Shipping at the end of the Russian regime and during the first decade of American rule. LCSH: Ship registers—Sitka, Alaska; Geographical Subject: Sitka (Alaska)—History—Sources. This book does not have an ISBN. Printing: 250 copies.
- Russia's Hawaiian Adventure, 1815–1817. 1976. xvii, 245 p., maps (on lining papers), illustrated, maps, index. Materials for the Study of Alaska History no. 8. Reprint of the 1965 edition from University of California Press. ISBN 0-919642-68-3 (hardcover ed.) ISBN 0-919642-69-1 (paperback ed.).
- Builders of Alaska: The Russian Governors, 1818–1867. Alaska History no. 28. 1986. Biographies of Alaska’s 13 forgotten governors, from Hagemeister to Maksutov. 53 pp., illustrated. ISBN 0-919642-07-1.
- Russian America, 1741–1867, A Biographical Dictionary. Alaska History no. 33. 1990. Data on over 600 Russian and foreign statesmen, explorers, administrators, and skippers, Native leaders and women. 560 pp., illustrated. ISBN 0-919642-45-4.

=== Articles ===
- Pierce, Richard A.: New Light on Ivan Petroff, Historian of Alaska. The Pacific Northwest Quarterly, Vol. 59, No. 1 (Jan., 1968), pp. 1–10.
- Pierce, Richard A. and Alexander Doll: Alaskan Treasure. The Alaska Journal, 1 (1): 2–7. 1971.
- Pierce, Richard A.: The Russian-American Company Currency. In: Barbara Sweetland Smith and Redmond J. Barnett (eds.), Russian America, A Forgotten Frontier, pp. 145–153. Washington State Historical Society, Tacoma, Washington. 1990.

== Notable translations ==
- Bolkhovitinov, Nikolai Nikolaevich: Russian-American Relations and the Sale of Alaska, 1834–1867. Alaska History no. 45. 1996. Translated and edited by Richard A. Pierce. 405 pp, illustrated, index. ISBN 1-895901-06-5.
- Fedorova, Svetlana Grigor’evna: The Russian Population in Alaska and California, Late 18th Century to 1867. Materials for the Study of Alaska History no. 4. 1973. 367 pp., illustrated, maps, index. Translated from the Russian edition of 1971 by Richard A. Pierce and Alton S. Donnelly. ISBN 0-919642-53-5. Original title: Русское население Аляски и Калифорнии: конец XVIII века –1867.
- Holmberg, Johann Heinrich: “Ethnographic Sketches of the Peoples of Russian America.” Acta Societatis Scientiarum Fennicae. Vol. 4 (1856), Vol. 7 (1863), (Helsinki). Translated by Richard A. Pierce. Alaska Division of State Libraries, 1974.
- Khlebnikov, Kiril Timofeevich: Notes on Russian America. Part I: Novo-Arkhangel’sk. Alaska History no. 43. 1994. 308 pp. Transcribed by Svetlana Fedorova. Translated from the Russian edition of 1985 by Serge Lecomte and Richard Pierce. ISBN 1-895901-04-9.
- Makarova, Raisa Vsevolodovna: Russians on the Pacific, 1743–1799. Materials for the Study of Alaska History no. 6. 1975. 301 pp., illustrated, maps, index. Translated from Russian edition of 1968. Translated and edited by Richard A. Pierce and Alton S. Donnelly. Out of print (1990). Original title: Русские на Тихом океане во второй половине XVIII в. / Р. В. Макарова; Мин. высшего и среднего спец. образования РСФСР;Московский гос. историко-архивный институт. LCSH: Fur trade—Northwest coast of North America; Russians in the Northwest coast of North America; Geographical Subject: Northwest coast of North America—Discovery and exploration. ISBN 0-919642-61-6.
- Sicouri, Paola Possolini and Kopylov, Yladimir: Forbidden Mountains: Most Beautiful Mountains in Russia and Central Asia. Paperback. Translated by Richard A. Pierce. ISBN 978-1-871890-88-4, ISBN 1-871890-88-8.
- Tikhmenev, Piotr Aleksandrovich: A History of the Russian-American Company. 1978. University of Washington Press. Translated from the Russian edition of 1861. Translated and edited by Richard A. Pierce and Alton S. Donnelly. Original title: Историческое обозрѣніе образованіе россійско-американской компаніи и дѣйствій ея до настоящаго времени / составилъ П. Тихменевъ, Санктпетербургъ, 1861. ISBN 978-0-295-95564-3.
- Five years of medical observations in the colonies of the Russian-American Company, 1843–1848 by Doctors Romanovskiĭ and Frankenhaeuser. Translated by Richard A. Pierce; prepared for Alaska Division of State Libraries. 1974. Original Russian publication: “Piatiletnia meditsinskiia nabliudeniia v koloniiakh Rossiisko-Amerikanskoi kompanii,” Zhurnal Ministerstva Vnutrennikh DEL (‘Journal of the Ministry of Internal Affairs’) St. Petersburg, 1849, Part 25, pp. 105–130, 219–236. 32 p. LC Control Number 82211523.

== See also ==
- The Limestone Press
