= Peter the Aleut =

Eastern Orthodox martyr and saint (died 1815)

Saint Peter the Aleut
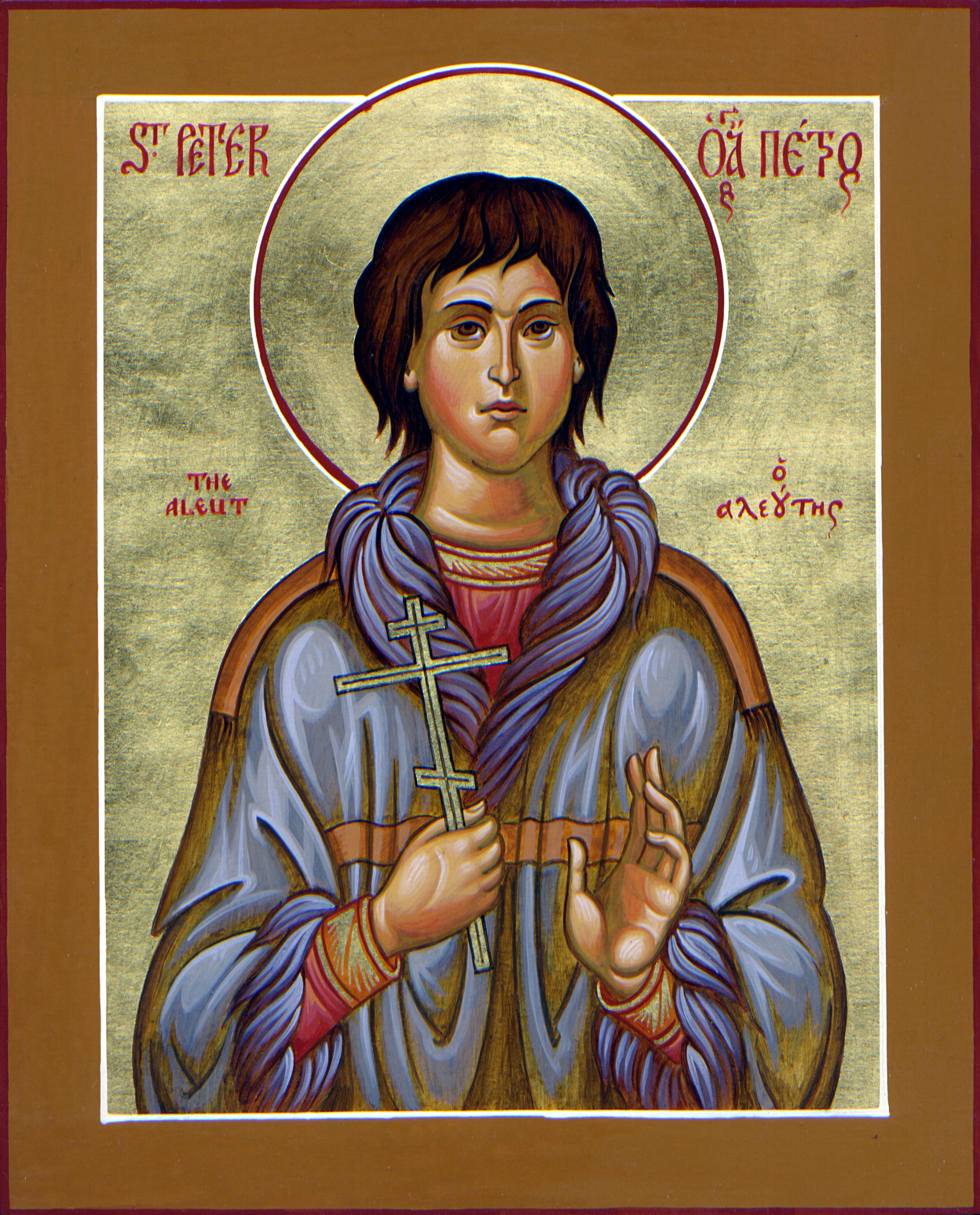
- Icon of St. Peter the Aleut

Martyr of San Francisco
- Born: Cungagnaq (spelling varies) c. AD 1800; Kodiak Archipelago, Russian Alaska
- Died: c. AD 1815 (aged 15); San Francisco, Alta California, New Spain
- Venerated in: Eastern Orthodox Church
- Canonized: 1980 by Russian Orthodox Church Outside of Russia and the Orthodox Church in America Diocese of Alaska
- Feast: September 24; December 12
- Attributes: Portrayed as an Aleut youth, wearing a traditional gut parka, holding a martyr's cross

Peter the Aleut (Russian: Пётр Алеу́т, romanized: Pyotr Aleút), born Cungagnaq (spelling varies) (Russian: Чукагнак, romanized: Chukagnak c. AD 1800; died 1815), is venerated as a martyr and saint by the Eastern Orthodox Church. He was a native of Kodiak Island (Alutiiq or Sugpiaq), and received the Christian name of Peter when he was baptized into the Eastern Orthodox Church by the monks of St Herman's missionaries operating in the north. According to the Eastern Orthodox Church, he was captured by Spanish soldiers near "San Pedro" in 1815 and killed either there or at a nearby location on the orders of the Jesuits, however this narrative is rejected by historians.

The most widely circulated source on Peter is a letter from Semyon Yanovsky written 50 years after the alleged murder. Historians reject the involvement of the Jesuits because they were not present in the territory at the time. In response, the Orthodox Church in America now maintains that Franciscans were actually responsible for killing Peter. However, historians also reject this explanation for his death.

== Biography and martyrdom ==
=== Name ===
Peter, the name by which he is commonly referred, is his baptismal name. His given name is in Alutiiq, and a number of spellings exist for it. His given name is commonly spelled Cungagnaq, referencing the color blue. Alisha Drabek, a researcher in Alutiiq ethnography, regards Cukagnaq as his proper name, which likely refers to youthful speed and quickness. The spelling Chukagnak is used by a 2016 article in the Journal of California and Great Basin Anthropology, while a 2007 academic article renders it Chunagnak.

=== Life ===
At the time identified for Peter's death, California was Spanish territory, and Spain was worried about Russian advances southwards from Alaska. According to the most fully developed version of the story, in 1815 a group of Russian employees of the Russian American Company and their Aleut seal and otter hunters, including Peter, was captured by Spanish soldiers, while hunting illicitly for seals near San Pedro, (which has variably been interpreted as either San Pedro, Los Angeles or as San Pedro y San Pablo Asistencia in Pacifica, California). According to the original account, the soldiers took them to "the mission in Saint-Pedro" for interrogation. One Russian source states that after being taken prisoner near modern Los Angeles, the captives were taken to Mission Dolores—that is, modern San Francisco.

== Historicity ==
There has been significant debate and dispute over the historicity of Peter the Aleut and his martyrdom, with historians rejecting the veracity of the Eastern Orthodox Church's account of his death.

=== Sources ===
There are four main primary sources concerning Peter the Aleut, stemming from one eyewitness account. This account is an 1819 deposition given by one Ivan Kiglay, first published in English in 2011. The other three sources are a February 15, 1820 report by Semyon Yanovsky to superiors in St. Petersburg, an 1820 report from the main administrator of the Russian-American Company sent to Tsar Alexander I, and finally a November 22, 1865 letter written by Semyon Yanovsky to the abbot of the Valaam Monastery.

Possibly the most widely circulated contemporary account of Peter the Aleut is Yanovsky's 1865 letter. Yanovsky's letter is dated November 22, 1865, and is written to Damascene, abbot of the Valaam Monastery, 50 years after his death. Yanovsky, who is also one of the chief sources of information about St. Herman of Alaska, was chief manager of the Russian colonies from 1818 to 1820. In the letter he was reporting on what he had heard from a supposed eyewitness about the killing that had taken place fifty years earlier in 1815.

=== Alleged Jesuit involvement ===
The 1865 Yanovsky letter contains the description of Peter being tortured by "Jesuits". Them earliest account, the 1819 deposition, makes no mention of Jesuits. Jesuit involvement would have been virtually impossible, as the Jesuit order had been expelled from all Spanish territories in 1767, suppressed generally in 1773, and had only been reconstituted in 1814 (one year before Peter's alleged death). In 1815 there were no Jesuits within several thousand miles of California, as the reconstitution of the Jesuits in New Spain (that is, Mexico) would not take place until 1816. Franciscans were present California at the time, establishing 21 missions from San Diego to San Francisco, beginning in 1769 and ending in the 1830s. This has led some, including the Orthodox Church in America, to believe that the "Jesuits" referenced in the 1865 letter were actually Franciscans,

In 1800s Russian literature and culture, being a Jesuit held extremely negative connotations, and the Jesuits were used to "symbolize the threat to Russia of Catholicism and Western European values and ideas". Jesuits were often part of greater conspiratorial narratives throughout Russian society, and inaccurate information about the order that was commonly fabricated in that culture is thought by historians to have made it into the story of Peter's alleged martyrdom.

Other historical sources describe an incident between Russians and Spaniards, but do not mention Peter or the Jesuits. Hubert Howe Bancroft, in his multi-volume History of California, only notes that one Russian source accused "the Spaniards of cruelty to the captives" in connection with an incident wherein a Russian fur-hunting expedition was taken into custody after declining to leave San Pedro.

== Location of martyrdom and "San Pedro" ==
Peter the Aleut has been referred to as a "martyr of San Francisco". Additionally, many modern descriptions of the martyrdom of Peter the Aleut often describe the event as occurring "in San Francisco", and others describe the Native Alaskan traders as being brought "to San Francisco". Other sources can be found describing the event as occurring near Los Angeles or in Southern California. These varying descriptions of the location may be based on varying oral traditions, varying understandings of the relationship of the location of the martyrdom and Fort Ross, and also on varying interpretations of references to "San Pedro" in the original historical documents.

The earliest historical sources about the death of Peter the Aleut describe the event as taking place in or near "the mission of San Pedro". Some have taken this to refer to San Pedro y San Pablo Asistencia, a "sub-mission" of Mission San Francisco de Asís (also known as Mission Dolores). San Pedro y San Pablo Asistencia was located on the site of the modern-day Sánchez Adobe Park in modern-day Pacifica, California.

Others have interpreted the historical description to refer to the dock in San Pedro, Los Angeles (now located in modern-day Los Angeles), which was used at the time as a trading post by Spanish missionary friars from Mission San Gabriel Arcángel. Such an interpretation of "San Pedro" fits well with other references to geographical locations in the historical documents, including an island named Santa Rosa (interpreted to refer to Santa Rosa Island) an island named "Climant" (interpreted to refer to San Clemente Island) and an island named Ekaterina, (interpreted by some to refer to Catalina Island). These documents also describe the captured Native Alaskan traders as transferred to Fort Ross, by way of sequential stops in Santa Barbara and Monterey. This interpretation of a Southern Californian location for the martyrdom is further supported by a letter contemporaneous to the alleged martyrdom event from Franciscan Fr. José Francisco de Paula Señan dated June 19, 1816 (but which runs counter to allegations of forced conversion and violence against the Native hunters from Russian America), which describes the capture and transfer of "Russian Indians" to the Santa Barbara Presidio from Mission San Buenaventura (in modern-day Ventura, California).

== Veneration ==
=== Pre-canonization ===
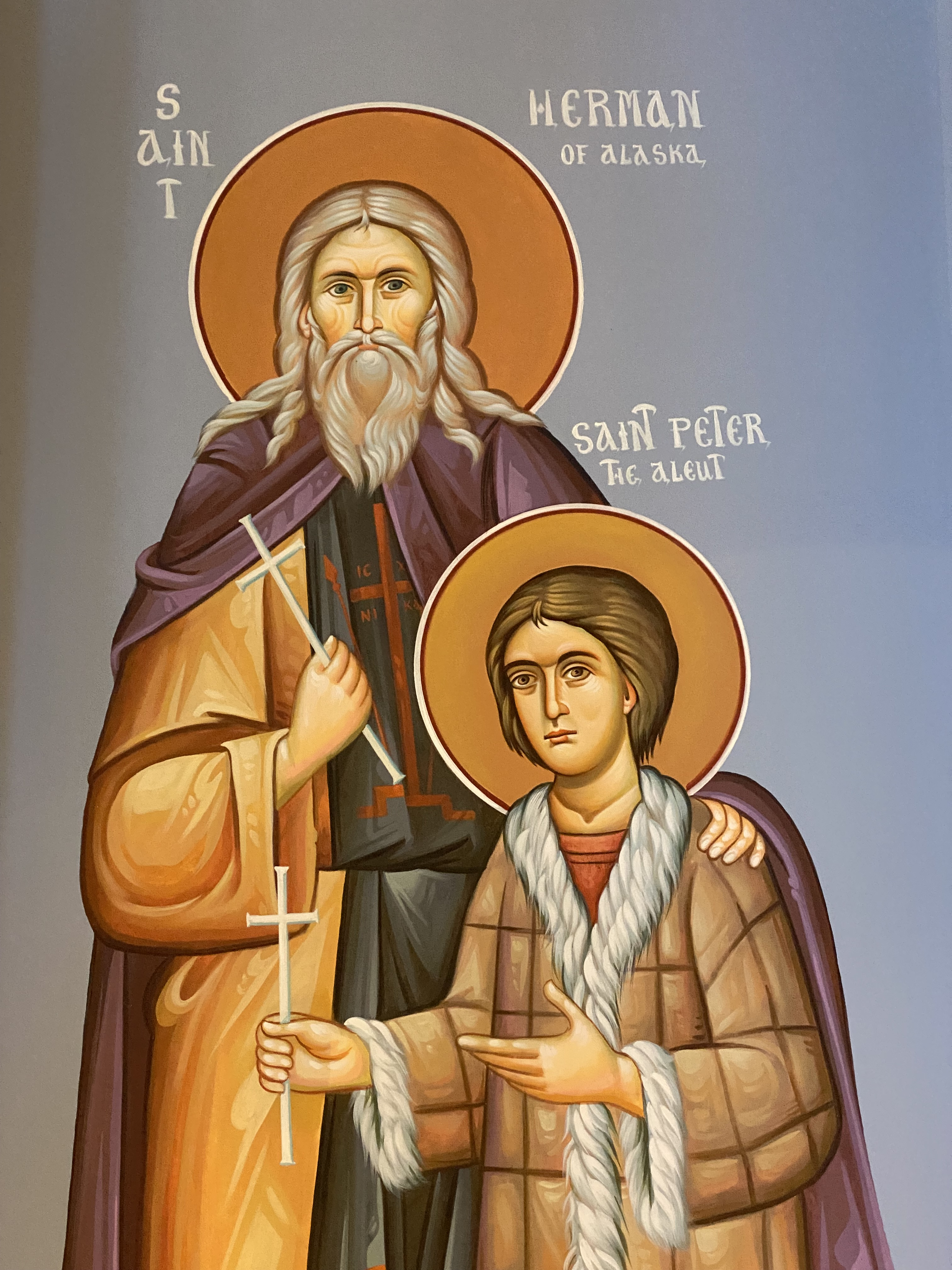
Icon of Saint Peter with St. Herman in an Orthodox parish in the United States

There are reports and examples of Peter being venerated before his canonization in 1980. According to Yanovsky's 1865 letter, upon receiving the report of Peter's death, St. Herman on Kodiak Island was moved to cry out, "Holy new-martyr Peter, pray to God for us!" In 1965, Peter was referenced as a martyr to be invoked in prayer by The Orthodox Word, in its very first edition. The same publication reported that by 1967, icons depicting Peter as a martyr were present in some Greek monasteries.

=== Canonization ===
Peter the Aleut was locally glorified by the Diocese of Alaska of the Orthodox Church in America in 1980. On November 13 of that year, the Russian Orthodox Church Outside of Russia also endorsed Peter's glorification. That church issued a synodal decree which stated that because Peter's name had been listed in the canonization service for St. Herman of Alaska, Peter would be considered canonized without need for an independent service.

His feast day is celebrated on September 24 or December 12. He is regarded as the "Martyr of San Francisco". A number of churches have been dedicated to him in North America, including churches at Lake Havasu City, Arizona, Minot, North Dakota, Calgary, and Abita Springs, Louisiana.

== See also ==
- Il'mena

== Sources ==
- Bancroft, Hubert Howe (1882), "XIV. Russians in California - Foundation and Progress of Fort Ross", California, Vol. II, 1801-1824, History of the Pacific States of North America, vol. 14, San Francisco: A. L. Bancroft & Company, pp. 307–309, LCCN 01022960, OCLC 648737 (Google Play Books link)
- Farris, Glenn, "The Strange Tale of Saint Peter, the Aleut: A Russian Orthodox Martyr on the California Frontier". A paper presented at "The Spanish Missions and California Indians Symposium," D-Q University, 3 March 1990.
- Ogden, Adele, The California Sea Otter Trade 1784-1848. (University of California Publications in History, 26). (Berkeley: University of California Press, 1941).
- The Russian Orthodox Religious Mission in America, 1794–1837, with Materials Concerning the Life and Works of the Monk German, and Ethnographic Notes by the Hieromonk Gedeon. Originally published in St. Petersburg, Russia in 1894. Translated from the Russian by Colin Bearne; ed. by Richard A. Pierce (Kingston, Ont., Canada: Limestone Press, 1978).
- Tarakanoff, Vassili Petrovitch, Statement of My Captivity Among the Californians (Los Angeles: Glen Dawson Press, 1953).
- Tikhmenev, P. A, A History of the Russian-American Company. Translated and edited by Richard Pierce and Alton Donnelly. (Seattle: Univ. of Washington Press, 1978).
