= Richard Dauenhauer =

American poet, linguist, and translator

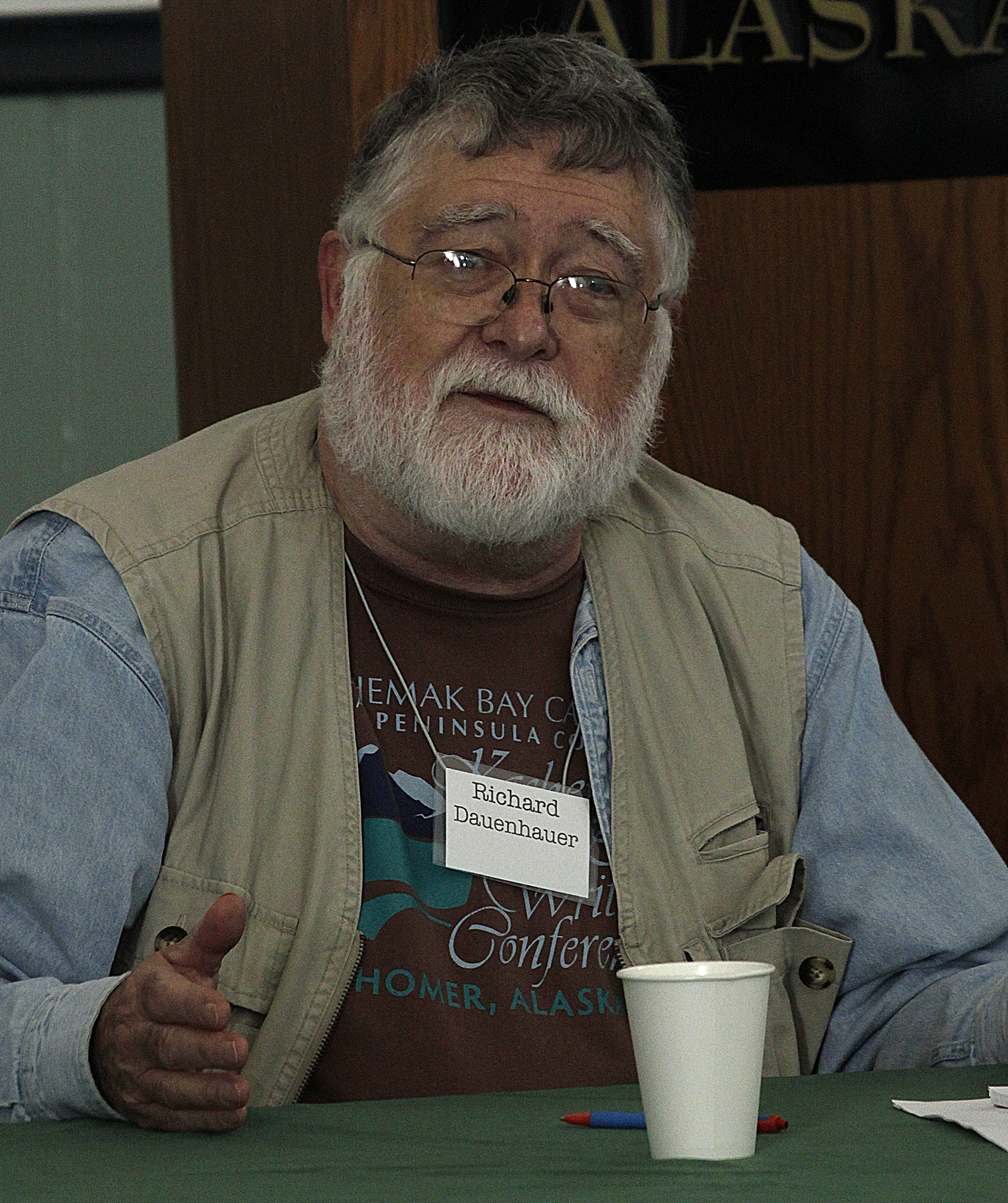
Richard Dauenhauer, less than three months before his death, speaking at a writers' symposium in Skagway, Alaska.

Richard Dauenhauer (April 10, 1942 – August 19, 2014) was an American poet, linguist, and translator who married into, and subsequently became an expert on, the Tlingit nation of southeastern Alaska. He was married to the Tlingit poet and scholar Nora Marks Dauenhauer. With his wife and Lydia T. Black, he won an American Book Award for Russians in Tlingit America: The Battles of Sitka, 1802 And 1804. He has translated works into German, Russian, Finnish, and Classical Greek.

== Life ==
Dauenhauer was born in Syracuse, New York. His B.A. was from Syracuse University in Russian and Slavic Languages and his M.A. from the University of Texas at Austin in German. In 1966 and 1967, he was a student in Finland. He earned his Ph.D. in Comparative Literature in 1975 from the University of Wisconsin–Madison, with a dissertation titled Text and Context of Tlingit Oral Tradition. He became a professor of literature at Alaska Methodist University in Anchorage, where he came in contact with the Tlingit people in the late 1960s. In 1973 he married his second wife Nora, and became an honorary member of the Tlingit people.

From 1981 to 1988, he was the poet laureate of Alaska. He worked as a program director at the Sealaska Heritage Institute from 1983 to 1997, and with his wife edited the foundation's highly regarded Classics of Tlingit Oral Literature series. He also became a professor at the University of Alaska Southeast until retiring in 2011.

Dauenhauer "made recording, transcribing and advocating for the Tlingit language his life's work". He and his wife published histories of the Tlingit people and translations of their works, made recordings of spoken works in Tlingit, and helped standardize a written form for the language. They wrote an introductory textbook on the Tlingit language, and he brought what had previously been the oral traditions of the Tlingit into his poetry. As a professor, he also trained many others to teach and translate Tlingit. As a result of his efforts, Tlingit-language teaching is now available to many Alaskans from grade school through the college level.

His papers 1961–1985 were held at the Special Collections of the University of Alaska Anchorage but later transferred to the Sealaska Heritage Institute for inclusion in the Dauenhaer Literary Estate Collection.

Dauenhauer died on August 19, 2014, in Juneau's Bartlett Regional Hospital, after having been diagnosed with pancreatic cancer a month prior.

== Works ==
- (with Philip Binham) (eds.) (1978) Snow in May: An Anthology of Finnish Writing 1945–1972. Madison, NJ: Fairleigh Dickinson University Press.
- (1980) Glacier Bay Concerto. Anchorage: Alaska Pacific University Press.
- (1982) "Two Missions to Alaska." Pacific Historian,, vol. 26, pp. 29–41.
- (1986) Phenologies. Austin: Thorp Springs Press.
- (1987) Frames of Reference. Haines, AK: Black Current Press.
- (1990) "Education in Russian Alaska." In: Russian America: The Forgotten Frontier, ed. by Barbara Smith and Redmond J. Barnett, pp. 155–163. Tacoma: Washington State Historical Society.
- (with Nora Marks Dauenhauer) "Beginning Tlingit", third edition. Juneau, AK: Sealaska Heritage Foundation Press. (1991[1976])
- (with Nora Marks Dauenhauer) (eds.) (1981) "Because We Cherish You ...": Sealaska Elders Speak to the Future. Juneau: Sealaska Heritage Foundation.
- (with Nora Marks Dauenhauer) (eds.) (1987) Haa Shuká, Our Ancestors: Tlingit Oral Narratives. (Classics of Tlingit Oral Literature, vol. 1.) Seattle: University of Washington Press.
- (with Nora Marks Dauenhauer) (eds.) (1990) Haa Tuwanáagu Yís, for Healing Our Spirit: Tlingit Oratory. (Classics of Tlingit Oral Literature, vol. 2.) Seattle: University of Washington Press.
- (with Nora Marks Dauenhauer) (eds.) (1994) Haa Ḵusteeyí, Our Culture: Tlingit Life Stories. (Classics of Tlingit Oral Literature, vol. 3.) Seattle: University of Washington Press.
- (with Nora Marks Dauenhauer) (1998) 'Technical, emotional and ideological issues in reversing language shift: examples from Southeast Alaska', in Grenoble, L A. & Whaley, L J. Endangered Languages: Language Loss and Community Response. Cambridge: Cambridge University Press
- Nora Dauenhauer; Richard Dauenhauer; Lydia T. Black, eds. (2008). Anóoshi Lingít Aaní Ká: Russians in Tlingit America. University of Washington Press. ISBN 978-0-295-98601-2.
- (2013) Benchmarks: New and Selected Poems 1963–2013. Fairbanks: University of Alaska Press.
