= Spruce Island (Alaska) =

Island in Gulf of Alaska

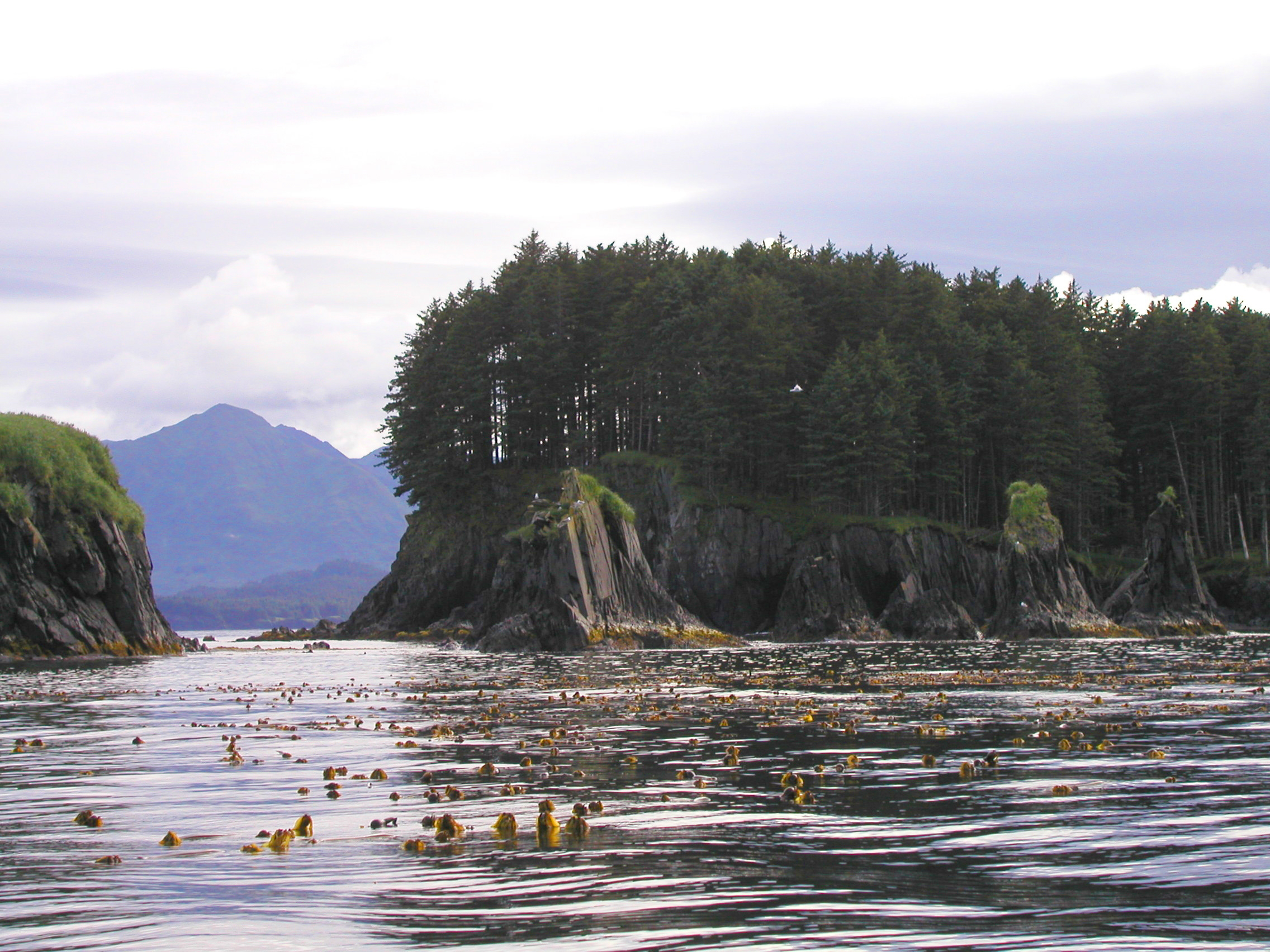
- Icon Bay

- Location within Alaska

Geography
- Location: North Pacific Ocean
- Coordinates: 57°55′05″N 152°24′35″W
- Archipelago: Kodiak Archipelago
- Area: 17.786 sq mi (46.07 km^{2})
- Highest elevation: 1,339 ft (408.1 m)

Administration
- United States
- State: Alaska
- Borough: Kodiak Island Borough

Demographics
- Population: 242 (2000)

Spruce Island (Russian: Ело́вый о́стров) is an island in the Kodiak Archipelago of the Gulf of Alaska in the US state of Alaska. It lies just off the northeast corner of Kodiak Island, across the Narrow Strait.

== Size and demographics ==
Spruce Island has a land area of 46.066 km^{2} (17.786 sq mi) and a population of 242, at the time of the 2000 census, whom reside mainly at the island's one settlement, Ouzinkie (in the southwestern part of the island).

== History ==
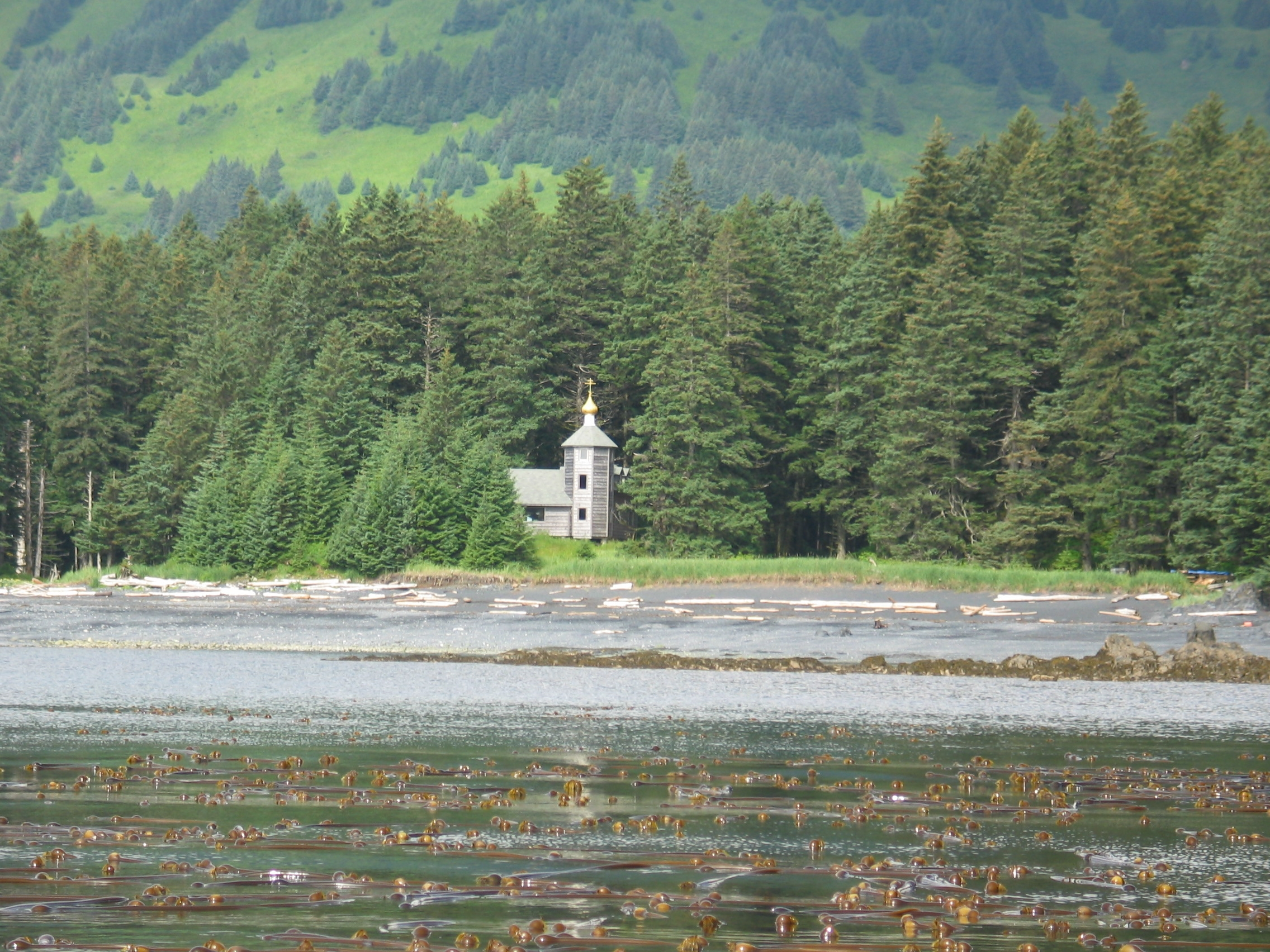
Russian Orthodox monastery at Monk's Lagoon, Icon Bay, Spruce Island, Alaska.

From 1808 to 1818, Spruce Island was the hermitage of Herman of Alaska, later glorified as a saint and considered the patron saint of Orthodox Christians in the New World. The island was referred to as New Valaam (Russian: Ново-Валаамский) by St. Herman, and is a site of pilgrimage for many American Orthodox Christians.

In 2008, a group of commentators and researchers—led by the mayor of the northern Siberian city of Yakutsk—argued that the island should, legally, still belong to the Russian Orthodox Church, as the Russian Empire had no authority to sell "religious property" as part of the Alaska Purchase.
