= Joasaph Bolotov =

Russian Orthodox bishop (b. 1761)

Bishop Joasaph (secular name Ivan Ilyich Bolotov, Russian: Иван Ильич Болотов; 22 January 1761 – May 1799) was a Russian Orthodox missionary to Alaska, bishop of Kodiak, vicar of the Diocese of Irkutsk.

He came to Alaska as the leader of a group of missionaries from the Valaam Monastery in 1794. Under very primitive conditions he and his monastic companions established the foundations of an Orthodox presence in North America. Called to Irkutsk, he was consecrated the auxiliary Bishop of Kodiak, but did not survive a shipwreck on his return to Alaska.

== Life ==
Ivan Ilyich Bolotov (Russian Иван Ильич Болотов) was born on January 22, 1761, in the village of Strazhkov in the Kashin district of the province of Tver. His father was the local priest in the village. His early education was at the ecclesiastical school at the monastery in Kashin. His education continued at the seminaries in Tver and Yaroslavl, graduating with honors. After graduating he taught at the Uglich ecclesiastical school for the next four years. Deciding to enter a monastic life he joined the Tolga Monastery where he received his tonsure in 1786 and was given the name of Joasaph.

Subsequently, he moved to a monastery in Uglich and then on to the Valaam. The dates of his ordination as a deacon and as a priest are not known. He was raised to the rank of archimandrite in 1783.

During this time, Russian traders had travelled to Alaska and spoken of Christianity to the Aleut people; by 1775, several Aluets in Umnak Island and Kodiak Island had already been baptised. When the call for assembling a missionary team to travel to remote Alaska was made, Fr. Joasaph was selected to lead the team based upon his accomplishments as a monastic. The team of ten consisted of Fr. Joasaph as leader, four hieromonks, a hierodeacon, two monks, and two servitors. (Chevigny 65)

The journey to Alaska took them ten months, nearly a year, before arriving in Kodiak, Alaska, on September 24, 1794. There, they found conditions not as represented to them by Grigorii Ivanovich Shelikhov, the promoter of the Alaskan enterprise. The village on Kodiak was more primitive than described and the church that was promised was not there. The monastics found many abuses between the Russians and the natives in the village about which Fr. Joasaph was compelled to report to the state and church authorities in Russia. Thus, an antagonistic environment grew between Alexander Baranov, the village leader, and Fr. Joasaph and his missionaries.

Notwithstanding the adverse conditions, Fr. Joasaph and his party of monks were very successful in evangelizing the natives and expanded their preaching and efforts to the mainland. Yet, reaching out to the natives involved dangers, as evidenced by the martyrdom of Fr. Juvenaly in 1796.

In reviewing the situation of the mission, in 1796, the Holy Synod created an auxiliary see in Alaska and elected Fr. Joasaph as Bishop of Kodiak. It was 1798 before news and instructions for his elevation reached him. For his elevation to bishop, Fr. Joasaph needed to return to Irkutsk, where he was consecrated on April 10, 1799. Bp. Joasaph's consecration was unusual in that, due to the isolation of Irkutsk from the Holy Synod, the Holy Synod provided instructions for Benjamin, Bishop of Irkutsk, to perform the consecration of Fr. Joasaph alone. Thus was recorded the only known situation in the history of the Church of Russia where an episcopal consecration was conducted by a single bishop.

== Death ==
Bp. Joasaph was not to reach his new see as the perils of travel in the northern seas would result in his death. Bp. Joasaph and his companions, Hieromonk Makary and Hierodeacon Stephan, perished as their ship Phoenix met with a serious storm and sank near the Alaskan coast during May 21 to 24, 1799. The ship was also carrying an important cargo of both people and supplies for the Kodiak colony. Thus, its loss seriously set back both the Orthodox mission in Alaska and the colony. The Holy Synod took no action to replace Bp. Joasaph and in 1811 officially closed the Kodiak episcopal see. It would be some thirty years before another hierarch would be named to Alaska.

== Sources ==
- Orthodox America 1794-1976 Development of the Orthodox Church in America, C. J. Tarasar, Gen. Ed. 1975, The Orthodox Church in America, Syosett, New York
- Hector Chevigny, Russian America — The Great Alaskan Venture, 1741 -1867. New York: Viking Press, 1965.
- Живаев Н. Свт. Иоасаф Кадьякский (Иван Ильич Болотов) // Вестник Ярославской духовной семинарии. - 2023. - № 5. - С. 212—217.
