= Jacob Netsvetov =

Russian priest

Saint Jacob Netsvetov
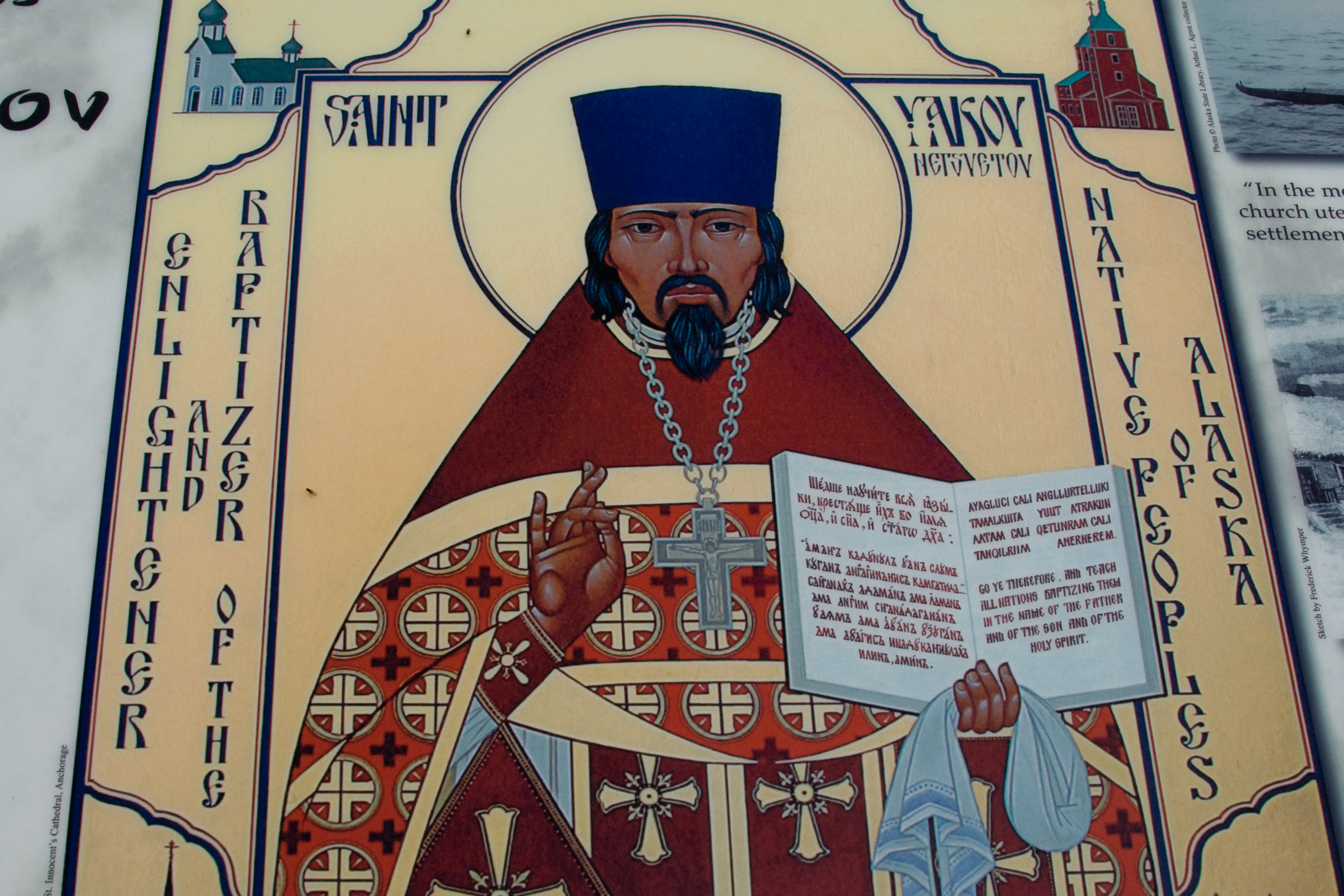

Enlightener of Alaska
- Born: 1802; Atka Island, Aleutian Islands
- Died: July 26, 1864; New Archangel (Sitka), Alaska
- Canonized: Oct 1994, Saint Innocent Cathedral Anchorage Alaska by Orthodox Church in America
- Feast: July 26

Jacob Netsvetov (Russian: Яков (Иаков) Егорович Нецветов), Enlightener of Alaska, was an Alaskan Creole from the Aleutian Islands who became a priest of the Orthodox Church and continued the missionary work of Innocent for Alaska Natives. His feast day is celebrated on July 26, the day of his death.

== Early life ==
Netsvetov was born Jacob Netsvetov in 1802, on Atka Island, part of the Aleutian Island chain in Alaska. He was the eldest child of four children that survived infancy, born to Yegor Vasil'evich Netsvetov from Tobolsk, Russia, and Maria Alekscevna, an Aleut from Atka Island. His father was a manager for the Russian-American Company. His surviving siblings were, in order of age, Osip (Joseph), Elena, and Antony.

== Education and ordination ==
Netsvetov enrolled in the Irkutsk Theological Seminary at an early age. Osip and Antony were enrolled in the St. Petersburg Naval Academy and became a naval officer and a ship builder respectively. His sister Elena married a clerk from the Russian-American Company.

On October 1, 1825, Netsvetov was tonsured a sub-deacon. He married Anna Simeonovna, a Russian woman who may have been, like he was, of a Creole background, and in 1826 he graduated from the seminary with certificates in history and theology. Upon his graduation, he was ordained a deacon on October 31, 1826, and assigned to the Holy Trinity-St. Peter Church in Irkutsk. Archbishop Michael ordained Netsvetov to the priesthood on March 4, 1828, making Netsvetov the first native Alaskan to be ordained to the priesthood. At this time he made plans to return to his native Alaska to preach the Word of God.

Upon departing, Archbishop Michael gave Netsvetov two antimensia, one for use in the new church that Netsvetov planned to build on Atka, and the other for use in Netsvetov's missionary travels. After a molieben, Netsvetov and his party set off for Alaska on May 1, 1828; the travelers included Netsvetov, his wife Anna, and his father Yegor who had been tonsured as a reader for the new Atka Church. This journey took over a year to complete, and they arrived in Atka on June 15, 1829.

== Missionary work in Atka ==
Netsvetov's new Atka Parish covered most of the islands and land surrounding the Bering Sea, including Amchitka, Attu, Copper, Bering, and Kuril Islands. Netsvetov was both bilingual and bicultural, which helped him establish himself in a diverse community.

While the St. Nicolas Church was under construction, Netsvetov used a large tent to hold services. He continued to use the tent after the church was completed, in order to preach in remote locations. By the end of 1829, six months after arriving at Akta, Netsvetov had recorded 16 baptisms, 442 chrismations, 53 marriages, and eight funerals.

With the completion of the church on Atka, Netsvetov turned to educating children, teaching them to read and write both Russian and Unangan Aleut. Initially the Russian-American Company helped support the school, but in 1841 the school was re-organized as a parish school. Many of his students would later become Aleut leaders. Netsvetov also helped in collecting and preparing fish and marine animal specimens for museums in Moscow and St. Petersburg. He corresponded with Innocent on linguistics and translation matters. He worked on an Unangan-Aleut alphabet, translations of the scriptures, and other church publications. In addition to praise from Innocent he began to receive awards for his services. In time he was elevated to archpriest and received the Order of St. Anna.

Netsvetov's wife Anna died in March 1836, and his home was destroyed in a fire in July of the same year. His father, Yegor, died the following year. After these events he petitioned his bishop in order to return to Irkutsk and enter a monastic life, a request that was approved a year later contingent on the arrival of his replacement. However, the church did not provide a replacement.

On December 30, 1844, Innocent appointed him head of the new Kvikhpak Mission along the Yukon River. With his nephew Vasili Netsvetov and two young Creole assistants named Innokentii Shayashnikov and Konstantin Lukin. Netsvetov established his headquarters in the Yup'ik village of Ikogmiute. From there, he traveled hundreds of miles along the Yukon and Kuskokwim Rivers, visiting the inhabitants of settlements along the way. For the next twenty years he learned new languages, met new people and cultures, invented another alphabet, and built more churches and communities. At the invitation of the native leaders, he travelled as far as the Innoko River, baptizing hundreds from many formerly hostile tribes.

An assistant lodged charges against him in 1863. To settle the case, his Bishop Peter called him to Sitka where he was cleared of all the charges. As his health worsened, he remained in Sitka serving at the Tlingit chapel.

During his last missionary travels in the Kuskokwim/Yukon delta region he is remembered for baptizing 1,320 people and for distinguishing himself as the evangelist of the Yup'ik and Athabascan peoples.

== Hymns ==
Troparion (Tone 4)

O righteous Father Jacob,
Adornment of Atka and the Yukon Delta;
You offered yourself as a living sacrifice
To bring light to a searching people.
Offspring of Russian America,
Flower of brotherly unity,
Healer of sickness and terror of demons:
O Holy Father Jacob,
Pray to Christ God that our souls may be saved.

Kontakion (Tone 3)

O Holy Father Jacob,
Teacher of the knowledge of God,
You revealed your love for your people,
Taking up your cross and following Christ,
Enduring hardships like the Apostle Paul.
Pray on our behalf to Christ our God
To grant us great mercy.

== Death ==
Saint Jacob Netsvetov's death was from natural causes while he was serving as a priest at Saint Michael's Cathedral on July 26, 1864 at the age of 60 and was buried at the Holy Trinity Church, Sitka. His legacy still goes on as many Russian descendants living in Alaska have family names that spring from 1800-1875 and follow the teachings of Saint Jacob Netsvetov in their day-to-day life.

== See also ==
- List of American Eastern Orthodox saints

== Sources ==
- Holy Synod of Bishops OCA, The Life of Saint Jacob Netsvetov, Oyster Bay Cove, New York, March 1994.
