= Alaska Historical Society =

Non-profit state historical society in Anchorage, Alaska

Alaska Historical Society is a 501(c)(3) non-profit state historical society in Anchorage, Alaska, United States. The Alaska Historical Society advocates for educational projects regarding Alaska's history. The Society holds an annual conference with a silent auction fundraiser and publishes a semi-annual historical journal, Alaska History and a quarterly newsletter Alaska History News. The Historical Society also preserves important pieces of Alaska history and records through its archives.

The Alaska Historical Society presents various annual awards.

== Journal ==
Alaska History
- Language: English
- Edited by: James H. Ducker

Publication details
- History: 1984 to present
- Publisher: Alaska Historical Society (United States)
- Frequency: Biannual

Standard abbreviations
- ISO 4: Alsk. Hist.

Indexing
- ISSN: 0890-6149
- LCCN: 87643825

Links
- Journal homepage

Alaska History is biannual a peer-reviewed academic journal of history that publishes scholarship relating to the history of Alaska. It was established in 1984 and is published by the Alaska Historical Society. The editor-in-chief is James H. Ducker. Its editorial offices are located in Anchorage, Alaska.

== See also ==
- List of historical societies in Alaska
