= Saint Herman Theological Seminary =

Saint Herman’s Orthodox Theological Seminary
- Type: Seminary
- Established: 1972; 54 years ago
- Religious affiliation: Orthodox Church in America
- Location: Kodiak, Alaska, United States; 57°47′22.1994″N 152°23′58.9194″W
- Website: https://sthermanseminary.org

Saint Herman’s Orthodox Theological Seminary is an Orthodox Christian seminary located in Kodiak, Alaska, with a campus in Anchorage. Established as a pastoral school in 1972, the seminary now provides a number of educational programs to prepare students for work in the Orthodox Church, as readers, choir directors, church school teachers, and clergy.

== History ==
With the closing of the Russian school at Unalaska in 1917, the Church in Alaska lost its ability to provide formal training for church workers and clergy. In time the lack of an institution to provide education locally was felt by the Diocese of Alaska as the shortage of trained people increased. To correct this situation, in September 1972, the diocese approved a proposal by the Archpriest Joseph P. Kreta to establish a pastoral school, which was the only practical way of solving this problem.

With the approval of the proposal by the diocesan council, the first semester of classes began on February 1, 1973. The classes were conducted in leased facilities at the Wildwood Station near Kenai, Alaska. This first class began with fourteen students. In August 1973, the Alaska State Department of Education recognized St. Herman’s Pastoral School as a diploma-granting institution.

The search for a permanent campus led to the procuring property in Kodiak, near the Church of the Holy Resurrection. In 1974, all classes were moved to the new facilities. In February 1975, St. Herman’s was recognized by the Holy Synod of the Orthodox Church in America as a theological school within its seminary system. Then in 1976, the Holy Synod approved the renaming of St. Herman’s as a Theological Seminary. The seminary was subsequently authorized under the Alaska ordinances to grant degrees of Bachelor of Sacred Theology and Associate of Arts in Theological Studies.

Since the creation of the seminary, over 90% of the student body has been composed of indigenous Alaskans—Aleut, Athabaskan, Tlingit and Yup'ik villagers—coming to study at Saint Herman's from all over rural Alaska.

== Programs ==
St. Herman’s Seminary offers a four-year program of theological, liturgical, patristics, and Biblical studies in a progression of one year programs. A one-year program is offered to prepare students to serve as readers and singers. This year is followed by a year of further Biblical studies, Church history and doctrine for teachers and catechists. As a diaconate program, the third year continues with classes in higher level theology and liturgical experience, and includes training in substance abuse counseling with a certification. A fourth year priestly formation program places emphasis on pastoral ministry and theological education and includes mentoring in prison and hospital ministry and in parish life and administration. All classes are held at the Kodiak campus.
