= August 14 =

August 14 this year in various calendars
- Friday, 14 August 2026
Akan	Monofie
Armenian	25 Nawasardi 1476
Aztec	Pānquetzaliztli 16, 9 Cuetzpalin
Babylonian	30 Du'uzu, 2337 SE
Balinese pawukon	Luang, Pepet, Kajeng, Laba, Pon, Maulu, Sukra of Tambir, Indra, Gigis, Duka
Bengali	30 Shrabon, BS 1433
Chinese	Yang Metal Monkey・Ghost Mansion; Fire Horse Year, Month 7, Day 2 (Liqiu, 9 days until Chushu)
Common Era	14 August 2026 CE
Coptic	8 Mesori, AM 1742
Egyptian	30 Choiak, 2775 NE
Ethiopian	8 Naḥasē, 2018 Amätä Məhrät
French Republican	Décade III, Septidi de Thermidor de l'Année 234 de la République
Gregorian	14 August, AD 2026
Hebrew	1 Elul, AM 5786
Hindu	Maghā・Parigha; Solar: 29 Śrāvaṇa, 1948 SE; Lunisolar: Dvitīyā, Śukla pakṣa of Śrāvaṇa, 2083 VE; Rāudra・5127 KY・1,872,801
Icelandic	Föstudagur, 20 Heyannir 2026
Islamic	29 Safar, AH 1448 (using tabular method)
ISO week date	2026-W33-5
Japanese	2 Fumizuki, Reiwa 8 (Risshū, 9 days until Shosho)
Julian	1 August, AD 2026 (AM 7534)
Julian day	2461267
Korean	2 Wonsungidal, 4359 DE
Maya	13.0.13.15.4; 17 Yaxkin, 9 Kan
Roman	Kalendis Augustis, MMDCCLXXIX AUC
Solar Hijri	23 Mordad, SH 1405
Tibetan	2 gro bzhin, me pho rta 2153 or 1772 or 1000

<<	August					>>
Su	Mo	Tu	We	Th	Fr	Sa
						1
2	3	4	5	6	7	8
9	10	11	12	13	14	15
16	17	18	19	20	21	22
23	24	25	26	27	28	29
30	31
2026

August 14 in recent years
2026 (Friday)
2025 (Thursday)
2024 (Wednesday)
2023 (Monday)
2022 (Sunday)
2021 (Saturday)
2020 (Friday)
2019 (Wednesday)
2018 (Tuesday)
2017 (Monday)

August 14 is the 226th day of the year (227th in leap years) in the Gregorian calendar; 139 days remain until the end of the year.

== Events ==
=== Pre-1600 ===
- 74 BC – A group of officials, led by the Western Han minister Huo Guang, present articles of impeachment against the new emperor, Liu He, to the imperial regent, Empress Dowager Shangguan.
- 70 BC – Gaius Verres is found guilty of corruption after his defense lawyer Quintus Hortensius abandons the case as hopeless.
- 29 BC – Octavian holds the second of three consecutive triumphs in Rome to celebrate the victory over the Dalmatian tribes.
- 1040 – King Duncan I is killed in battle against his first cousin and rival Macbeth. The latter succeeds him as King of Scotland.
- 1136 – Abbasid Caliph al-Rashid Billah flees from Bagdhad, which had been besieged by an army of the Seljuk Turks under Sultan Ghiyath ad-Din Mas'ud for fifty days.
- 1183 – Taira no Munemori and the Taira clan take the young Emperor Antoku and the three sacred treasures and flee to western Japan to escape pursuit by the Minamoto clan.
- 1264 – After tricking the Venetian galley fleet into sailing east to the Levant, the Genoese capture an entire Venetian trade convoy at the Battle of Saseno.
- 1352 – War of the Breton Succession: Anglo-Bretons defeat the French in the Battle of Mauron.
- 1370 – Charles IV, Holy Roman Emperor, grants city privileges to Karlovy Vary.
- 1385 – Portuguese Crisis of 1383–85: Battle of Aljubarrota: Portuguese forces commanded by John I of Portugal defeat the Castilian army of John I of Castile.
- 1592 – The first sighting of the Falkland Islands by John Davis.
- 1598 – Nine Years' War: Battle of the Yellow Ford: Irish forces under Hugh O'Neill, Earl of Tyrone, defeat an English expeditionary force under Henry Bagenal.

=== 1601–1900 ===
- 1720 – The Spanish military Villasur expedition is defeated by Pawnee and Otoe warriors near present-day Columbus, Nebraska.
- 1784 – Russian colonization of North America: Awa'uq Massacre: The Russian fur trader Grigory Shelikhov storms a Kodiak Island Alutiit refuge rock on Sitkalidak Island, killing 500+ Alutiit.
- 1790 – The Treaty of Wereloe ends the 1788–1790 Russo-Swedish War.
- 1791 – Slaves from plantations in Saint-Domingue hold a Vodou ceremony led by houngan Dutty Boukman at Bois Caïman, marking the start of the Haitian Revolution.
- 1814 – A cease fire agreement, called the Convention of Moss, ends the Swedish–Norwegian War.
- 1816 – The United Kingdom formally annexes the Tristan da Cunha archipelago, administering the islands from the Cape Colony in South Africa.
- 1842 – American Indian Wars: Second Seminole War ends, with the Seminoles forced from Florida.
- 1848 – Oregon Territory is organized by act of Congress.
- 1848 – Pica Law (Legge Pica), a form of martial law, is established as the Italian government passes this anti-brigandage law to suppress resistance to the Unification of Italy.
- 1880 – Construction of Cologne Cathedral, the most famous landmark in Cologne, Germany, is completed.
- 1885 – Japan's first patent is issued to the inventor of a rust-proof paint.
- 1893 – France becomes the first country to introduce motor vehicle registration.
- 1900 – Battle of Peking: The Eight-Nation Alliance occupies Beijing, China, in a campaign to end the bloody Boxer Rebellion in China.

=== 1901–present ===
- 1901 – The first claimed powered flight, by Gustave Whitehead in his Number 21.
- 1914 – World War I: Start of the Battle of Lorraine, an unsuccessful French offensive.
- 1917 – World War I: The Republic of China, which had heretofore been shipping labourers to Europe to assist in the war effort, officially declares war on the Central Powers, although it will continue to send to Europe labourers instead of combatants for the remaining duration of the war.
- 1920 – The 1920 Summer Olympics, having started four months earlier, officially open in Antwerp, Belgium, with the newly adopted Olympic flag and the Olympic oath being raised and taken at the Opening Ceremony for the first time in Olympic history.
- 1921 – Tannu Uriankhai, later Tuvan People's Republic is established as a completely independent country (which is supported by Soviet Russia).
- 1933 – Loggers cause a forest fire in the Coast Range of Oregon, later known as the first forest fire of the Tillamook Burn; destroying 240,000 acres (970 km^{2}) of land.
- 1935 – Franklin D. Roosevelt signs the Social Security Act, creating a government pension system for the retired.
- 1936 – Rainey Bethea is hanged in Owensboro, Kentucky in the last known public execution in the United States.
- 1941 – World War II: Winston Churchill and Franklin D. Roosevelt sign the Atlantic Charter of war stating postwar aims.
- 1947 – Pakistan gains independence from the British Empire as the Dominion of Pakistan, due to the partition of India.
- 1948 – An Idaho Department of Fish and Game program to relocate beavers known as Beaver drop occurred. This program relocated beavers from Northwestern Idaho to Central Idaho by airplane and then parachuting the beavers into the Chamberlain Basin.
- 1959 – Founding and first official meeting of the American Football League.
- 1967 – UK Marine Broadcasting Offences Act 1967 declares participation in offshore pirate radio illegal.
- 1969 – The Troubles: British troops are deployed in Northern Ireland as political and sectarian violence breaks out, marking the start of the 37-year Operation Banner.
- 1971 – Bahrain declares independence from Britain.
- 1972 – An Ilyushin Il-62 airliner crashes near Königs Wusterhausen, East Germany killing 156 people.
- 1974 – Turkey launches the second phase of the invasion of Cyprus, which eventually resulted in the Turkish occupation of 37% of Cyprus.
- 1980 – Lech Wałęsa leads strikes at the Gdańsk, Poland shipyards.
- 1994 – Ilich Ramírez Sánchez, also known as "Carlos the Jackal", is captured.
- 1996 – Greek Cypriot refugee Solomos Solomou is shot and killed by a Turkish security officer while trying to climb a flagpole in order to remove a Turkish flag from its mast in the United Nations Buffer Zone in Cyprus.
- 2003 – A widescale power blackout affects the northeast United States and Canada.
- 2005 – Helios Airways Flight 522, en route from Larnaca, Cyprus to Prague, Czech Republic via Athens, crashes in the hills near Grammatiko, Greece, killing 121 passengers and crew.
- 2006 – Lebanon War: A ceasefire takes effect three days after the United Nations Security Council's approval of United Nations Security Council Resolution 1701, formally ending hostilities between Lebanon and Israel.
- 2006 – Sri Lankan Civil War: Sixty-one schoolgirls killed in Chencholai bombing by Sri Lanka Air Force air strike.
- 2007 – The Kahtaniya bombings kill at least 500 people.
- 2013 – Egypt declares a state of emergency as security forces kill hundreds of demonstrators supporting former president Mohamed Morsi.
- 2013 – UPS Airlines Flight 1354 crashes short of the runway at Birmingham–Shuttlesworth International Airport, killing both crew members on board.
- 2015 – The U.S. Embassy in Havana, Cuba re-opens after 54 years of being closed when Cuba–United States relations were broken off.
- 2018 – The collapse of the Ponte Morandi bridge in Genoa, Italy, left 16 people injured and 43 people killed.
- 2021 – A magnitude 7.2 earthquake strikes southwestern Haiti, killing at least 2,248 people and causing a humanitarian crisis.
- 2022 – An explosion destroys a market in Armenia, killing six people and injuring dozens.
- 2023 – Former U.S. president Donald Trump is charged in Georgia along with 18 others in attempting to overturn the results of the 2020 election in that state, his fourth indictment of 2023.

== Births ==
=== Pre-1600 ===
- 1479 – Catherine of York (died 1527)
- 1499 – John de Vere, 14th Earl of Oxford, English politician (died 1526)
- 1502 – Pieter Coecke van Aelst, Flemish painter (died 1550)
- 1530 – Giambattista Benedetti, Italian mathematician and physicist (died 1590)
- 1552 – Paolo Sarpi, Italian writer (died 1623)
- 1599 – Méric Casaubon, Swiss-English scholar and author (died 1671)

=== 1601–1900 ===
- 1642 – Cosimo III de' Medici, Grand Duke of Tuscany (died 1723)
- 1653 – Christopher Monck, 2nd Duke of Albemarle, English colonel and politician, Lieutenant Governor of Jamaica (died 1688)
- 1688 – Frederick William I of Prussia (died 1740)
- 1714 – Claude Joseph Vernet, French painter (died 1789)
- 1737 – Charles Hutton, English mathematician and surveyor (died 1823)
- 1738 – Leopold Hofmann, Austrian composer and conductor (died 1793)
- 1742 – Pope Pius VII (died 1823)
- 1758 – Carle Vernet, French painter and lithographer (died 1836)
- 1777 – Hans Christian Ørsted, Danish physicist and chemist (died 1851)
- 1802 – Letitia Elizabeth Landon, English poet and novelist (died 1838)
- 1814 – Charlotte Fowler Wells, American phrenologist and publisher (died 1901)
- 1817 – Alexander H. Bailey, American lawyer, judge, and politician (died 1874)
- 1840 – Richard von Krafft-Ebing, German-Austrian psychologist and author (died 1902)
- 1847 – Robert Comtesse, Swiss lawyer and politician (died 1922)
- 1848 – Margaret Lindsay Huggins, Anglo-Irish astronomer and author (died 1915)
- 1851 – Doc Holliday, American dentist and gambler (died 1887)
- 1860 – Ernest Thompson Seton, American author, artist, and naturalist (died 1946)
- 1863 – Ernest Thayer, American poet and author (died 1940)
- 1865 – Guido Castelnuovo, Italian mathematician and academic (died 1952)
- 1866 – Charles Jean de la Vallée-Poussin, Belgian mathematician and academic (died 1962)
- 1867 – Cupid Childs, American baseball player (died 1912)
- 1867 – John Galsworthy, English novelist and playwright, Nobel Prize laureate (died 1933)
- 1871 – Guangxu Emperor of China (died 1908)
- 1875 – Mstislav Dobuzhinsky, Russian-Lithuanian painter and illustrator (died 1957)
- 1876 – Alexander I of Serbia (died 1903)
- 1881 – Francis Ford, American actor, director, producer, and screenwriter (died 1953)
- 1883 – Ernest Everett Just, American biologist and academic (died 1941)
- 1886 – Arthur Jeffrey Dempster, Canadian-American physicist and academic (died 1950)
- 1889 – Otto Tief, Estonian lawyer and politician, Prime Minister of Estonia (died 1976)
- 1890 – Bruno Tesch, German chemist and businessman (died 1946)
- 1892 – Kaikhosru Shapurji Sorabji, English pianist, composer, and critic (died 1988)
- 1894 – Frank Burge, Australian rugby league player and coach (died 1958)
- 1895 – Jack Gregory, Australian cricketer (died 1973)
- 1895 – Amaza Lee Meredith, American architect (died 1984)
- 1896 – Albert Ball, English fighter pilot (died 1917)
- 1896 – Theodor Luts, Estonian director and cinematographer (died 1980)
- 1900 – Margret Boveri, German journalist (died 1975)

=== 1901–present ===
- 1909 – Stuff Smith, American jazz violinist, vocalist, and composer (died 1967)
- 1910 – Nüzhet Gökdoğan, Turkish astronomer and mathematician (died 2003)
- 1910 – Willy Ronis, French photographer (died 2009)
- 1910 – Pierre Schaeffer, French composer and producer (died 1995)
- 1912 – Frank Oppenheimer, American physicist and academic (died 1985)
- 1913 – Hector Crawford, Australian director and producer (died 1991)
- 1913 – Paul Dean, American baseball player (died 1981)
- 1914 – Herman Branson, American physicist, chemist, and academic (died 1995)
- 1915 – B. A. Santamaria, Australian political activist and publisher (died 1998)
- 1916 – Frank and John Craighead, American naturalists (twins, Frank d. 2001, John d. 2016)
- 1916 – Wellington Mara, American businessman (died 2005)
- 1923 – Alice Ghostley, American actress (died 2007)
- 1924 – Sverre Fehn, Norwegian architect, designed the Hedmark Museum (died 2009)
- 1924 – Georges Prêtre, French conductor (died 2017)
- 1925 – Russell Baker, American critic and essayist (died 2019)
- 1926 – René Goscinny, French author and illustrator (died 1977)
- 1926 – Buddy Greco, American singer and pianist (died 2017)
- 1928 – Lina Wertmüller, Italian director and screenwriter (died 2021)
- 1929 – Giacomo Capuzzi, Italian Roman Catholic prelate, bishop of the Roman Catholic Diocese of Lodi from 1989 to 2005 (died 2021).
- 1929 – Dick Tiger, Nigerian boxer (died 1971)
- 1930 – Arthur Latham, British politician and Member of Parliament (died 2016)
- 1930 – Earl Weaver, American baseball player and manager (died 2013)
- 1931 – Frederic Raphael, American journalist, author, and screenwriter
- 1932 – Lee Hoffman, American author (died 2007)
- 1933 – Richard R. Ernst, Swiss chemist and academic, Nobel Prize laureate (died 2021)
- 1935 – John Brodie, American football player
- 1938 – Bennie Muller, Dutch footballer (died 2024)
- 1941 – David Crosby, American singer-songwriter and guitarist (died 2023)
- 1941 – Connie Smith, American country music singer-songwriter and guitarist
- 1942 – Willie Dunn, Canadian singer-songwriter and producer (died 2013)
- 1943 – Ronnie Campbell, English miner and politician (died 2024)
- 1943 – Ben Sidran, American jazz and rock keyboardist
- 1944 – Ahad Hosseini, Iranian Azerbaijani artist
- 1945 – Steve Martin, American actor, comedian, musician, producer, and screenwriter
- 1945 – Wim Wenders, German director, producer, and screenwriter
- 1946 – Antonio Fargas, American actor
- 1946 – Larry Graham, American soul/funk bass player and singer-songwriter
- 1946 – Susan Saint James, American actress (died 2026)
- 1946 – Tom Walkinshaw, Scottish racing driver and businessman (died 2010)
- 1947 – Maddy Prior, English folk singer
- 1947 – Danielle Steel, American author
- 1947 – Joop van Daele, Dutch footballer (died 2025)
- 1949 – Bob Backlund, American wrestler
- 1949 – Morten Olsen, Danish footballer
- 1950 – Gary Larson, American cartoonist
- 1951 – Slim Dunlap, American singer-songwriter and guitarist (died 2024)
- 1951 – Carl Lumbly, American actor
- 1952 – Debbie Meyer, American swimmer
- 1953 – James Horner, American composer and conductor (died 2015)
- 1954 – Mark Fidrych, American baseball player and sportscaster (died 2009)
- 1954 – Stanley A. McChrystal, American general
- 1956 – Jackée Harry, American actress and television personality
- 1956 – Andy King, English footballer and manager (died 2015)
- 1956 – Rusty Wallace, American race car driver
- 1957 – Peter Costello, Australian lawyer and politician
- 1959 – Frank Brickowski, American basketball player
- 1959 – Marcia Gay Harden, American actress
- 1959 – Magic Johnson, American basketball player and coach
- 1960 – Sarah Brightman, English singer and actress
- 1960 – Fred Roberts, American basketball player
- 1961 – Susan Olsen, American actress and radio host
- 1962 – Mark Gubicza, American baseball player
- 1963 – José Cóceres, Argentine golfer
- 1964 – Neal Anderson, American football player and coach
- 1964 – Jason Dunstall, Australian footballer
- 1965 – Paul Broadhurst, English golfer
- 1966 – Halle Berry, American model, actress, and producer
- 1966 – Karl Petter Løken, Swedish-Norwegian footballer
- 1968 – Ben Bass, American actor
- 1968 – Catherine Bell, English-American actress and producer
- 1968 – Darren Clarke, Northern Irish golfer
- 1968 – Jason Leonard, English rugby player
- 1969 – Tracy Caldwell Dyson, American chemist and astronaut
- 1969 – Stig Tøfting, Danish footballer
- 1970 – Kevin Cadogan, American rock guitarist
- 1971 – Raoul Bova, Italian actor, producer, and screenwriter
- 1971 – Benito Carbone, Italian footballer
- 1971 – Peter Franzén, Finnish actor
- 1971 – Mark Loretta, American baseball player
- 1972 – Laurent Lamothe, Haitian businessman and politician, Prime Minister of Haiti
- 1973 – Jared Borgetti, Mexican footballer
- 1973 – Kieren Perkins, Australian swimmer
- 1974 – Chucky Atkins, American basketball player
- 1974 – Christopher Gorham, American actor
- 1975 – Mike Vrabel, American football player
- 1976 – Fabrizio Donato, Italian triple jumper
- 1977 – Juan Pierre, American baseball player
- 1978 – Anastasios Kyriakos, Greek footballer
- 1978 – Greg Rawlinson, New Zealand rugby player
- 1979 – Paul Burgess, Australian pole vaulter
- 1980 – Peter Malinauskas, Australian politician, 47th Premier of South Australia
- 1981 – Earl Barron, American basketball player
- 1981 – Paul Gallen, Australian rugby league player, boxer, and sportscaster
- 1981 – Julius Jones, American football player
- 1981 – Kofi Kingston, Ghanaian-American wrestler
- 1981 – Scott Lipsky, American tennis player
- 1983 – Elena Baltacha, Ukrainian-Scottish tennis player (died 2014)
- 1983 – Mila Kunis, Ukrainian-American actress
- 1983 – Lamorne Morris, American actor and comedian
- 1983 – Spencer Pratt, American television personality
- 1984 – Eva Birnerová, Czech tennis player
- 1984 – Clay Buchholz, American baseball player
- 1984 – Giorgio Chiellini, Italian footballer
- 1984 – Josh Gorges, Canadian ice hockey player
- 1984 – Nick Grimshaw, English radio and television host
- 1984 – Nicola Slater, Scottish tennis player
- 1984 – Robin Söderling, Swedish tennis player
- 1985 – Christian Gentner, German footballer
- 1985 – Shea Weber, Canadian ice hockey player
- 1986 – Braian Rodríguez, Uruguayan footballer
- 1987 – Johnny Gargano, American wrestler
- 1987 – David Peralta, Venezuelan baseball player
- 1987 – Tim Tebow, American football and baseball player and sportscaster
- 1989 – Ander Herrera, Spanish footballer
- 1989 – Kyle Turris, Canadian ice hockey player
- 1991 – Richard Freitag, German ski jumper
- 1991 – Giovanny Gallegos, Mexican baseball player
- 1994 – Maya Jama, British TV presenter.
- 1995 – Léolia Jeanjean, French tennis player
- 1997 – Greet Minnen, Belgian tennis player
- 1998 – Doechii, American rapper
- 2000 – Johan Rojas, Dominican baseball player
- 2004 – Marsai Martin, American actress and producer
- 2007 – Franco Mastantuono, Argentine footballer

== Deaths ==
=== Pre-1600 ===
- 582 – Tiberius II Constantine, Byzantine emperor
- 1040 – Duncan I of Scotland
- 1167 – Rainald of Dassel, Italian archbishop
- 1204 – Minamoto no Yoriie, second Shōgun of the Kamakura shogunate
- 1433 – John I of Portugal (born 1357)
- 1464 – Pope Pius II (born 1405)
- 1573 – Saitō Tatsuoki, Japanese daimyō (born 1548)

=== 1601–1900 ===
- 1691 – Richard Talbot, 1st Earl of Tyrconnell, Irish soldier and politician (born 1630)
- 1716 – Madre María Rosa, Capuchin nun from Spain, to Peru (born 1660)
- 1727 – William Croft, English organist and composer (born 1678)
- 1774 – Johann Jakob Reiske, German physician and scholar (born 1716)
- 1784 – Nathaniel Hone the Elder, Irish-born English painter and academic (born 1718)
- 1852 – Margaret Taylor, First Lady of the United States (born 1788)
- 1854 – Carl Carl, Polish-born actor and theatre director (born 1787)
- 1860 – André Marie Constant Duméril, French zoologist and entomologist (born 1774)
- 1870 – David Farragut, American admiral (born 1801)
- 1890 – Michael J. McGivney, American priest, founded the Knights of Columbus (born 1852)
- 1891 – Sarah Childress Polk, First Lady of the United States (born 1803)

=== 1901–present ===
- 1905 – Simeon Solomon, English soldier and painter (born 1840)
- 1909 – William Stanley, British engineer and author (born 1829)
- 1922 – Rebecca Cole, American physician and social reformer (born 1846)
- 1928 – Klabund, German author and poet (born 1890)
- 1938 – Hugh Trumble, Australian cricketer and accountant (born 1876)
- 1941 – Maximilian Kolbe, Polish martyr and saint (born 1894)
- 1941 – Paul Sabatier, French chemist and academic, Nobel Prize laureate (born 1854)
- 1943 – Joe Kelley, American baseball player and manager (born 1871)
- 1948 – Eliška Misáková, Czech gymnast (born 1926)
- 1951 – William Randolph Hearst, American publisher and politician, founded the Hearst Corporation (born 1863)
- 1954 – Hugo Eckener, German pilot and airship designer (born 1868)
- 1955 – Herbert Putnam, American lawyer and publisher, Librarian of Congress (born 1861)
- 1956 – Bertolt Brecht, German poet, playwright, and director (born 1898)
- 1956 – Konstantin von Neurath, German lawyer and politician, Reich Minister of Foreign Affairs (born 1873)
- 1958 – Frédéric Joliot-Curie, French physicist and chemist, Nobel Prize laureate (born 1900)
- 1963 – Clifford Odets, American director, playwright, and screenwriter (born 1906)
- 1964 – Johnny Burnette, American singer-songwriter (born 1934)
- 1965 – Vello Kaaristo, Estonian skier (born 1911)
- 1967 – Bob Anderson, English motorcycle racer and racing driver (born 1931)
- 1972 – Oscar Levant, American actor, pianist, and composer (born 1906)
- 1972 – Jules Romains, French author and poet (born 1885)
- 1973 – Fred Gipson, American journalist and author (born 1908)
- 1978 – Nicolas Bentley, English author and illustrator (born 1907)
- 1980 – Dorothy Stratten, Canadian-American model and actress (born 1960)
- 1981 – Karl Böhm, Austrian conductor and director (born 1894)
- 1981 – Dudley Nourse, South African cricketer (born 1910)
- 1982 – Mahasi Sayadaw, Burmese monk and philosopher (born 1904)
- 1984 – Spud Davis, American baseball player, coach, and manager (born 1904)
- 1984 – J. B. Priestley, English novelist and playwright (born 1894)
- 1985 – Gale Sondergaard, American actress (born 1899)
- 1988 – Roy Buchanan, American singer-songwriter and guitarist (born 1939)
- 1988 – Robert Calvert, South African-English singer-songwriter and playwright (born 1945)
- 1988 – Enzo Ferrari, Italian racing driver and businessman, founded Ferrari (born 1898)
- 1991 – Alberto Crespo, Argentinian racing driver (born 1920)
- 1992 – John Sirica, American lawyer and judge (born 1904)
- 1994 – Elias Canetti, Bulgarian-Swiss author, Nobel Prize laureate (born 1905)
- 1994 – Alice Childress, American actress, playwright, and author (born 1912)
- 1996 – Sergiu Celibidache, Romanian conductor and composer (born 1912)
- 1999 – Pee Wee Reese, American baseball player and sportscaster (born 1918)
- 2002 – Larry Rivers, American painter and sculptor (born 1923)
- 2003 – Helmut Rahn, German footballer (born 1929)
- 2004 – Czesław Miłosz, Polish-born American novelist, essayist, and poet, Nobel Prize laureate (born 1911)
- 2004 – Trevor Skeet, New Zealand-English lawyer and politician (born 1918)
- 2006 – Bruno Kirby, American actor (born 1949)
- 2007 – Tikhon Khrennikov, Russian pianist and composer (born 1913)
- 2010 – Herman Leonard, American photographer (born 1923)
- 2012 – Vilasrao Deshmukh, Indian lawyer and politician, Chief Minister of Maharashtra (born 1945)
- 2012 – Svetozar Gligorić, Serbian chess player (born 1923)
- 2012 – Phyllis Thaxter, American actress (born 1919)
- 2013 – Jack Germond, American journalist and author (born 1928)
- 2014 – Leonard Fein, American journalist and academic, co-founded Moment Magazine (born 1934)
- 2014 – George V. Hansen, American politician (born 1930)
- 2015 – Bob Johnston, American songwriter and producer (born 1932)
- 2016 – Fyvush Finkel, American actor (born 1922)
- 2018 – Jill Janus, American singer (born 1975)
- 2019 – Polly Farmer, Australian footballer and coach (born 1935)
- 2020 – Julian Bream, English classical guitarist and lutenist (born 1933)
- 2020 – Angela Buxton, British tennis player (born 1934)
- 2020 – James R. Thompson, American politician, Governor of Illinois (born 1936)
- 2021 – Michael Aung-Thwin, American historian and scholar of Burmese and Southeast Asian history (born 1946)
- 2023 – Delwar Hossain Sayeedi, Bangladeshi Islamic lecturer, politician (born 1940)
- 2024 – Gena Rowlands, American actress (born 1930)
- 2025 – Mike Castle, American politician, 69th Governor of Delaware (born 1939)

== Holidays and observances ==
- Christian feast day:
  - Arnold of Soissons
  - Domingo Ibáñez de Erquicia
  - Eusebius of Rome
  - Fachtna of Rosscarbery
  - Jonathan Myrick Daniels (Episcopal Church)
  - Maria Elisabetta Renzi
  - Martyrs of Otranto
  - Maximilian Kolbe
- National Navajo Code Talkers Day is a holiday in the United States honoring Navajo code talkers in the military.
- Falklands Day is the celebration of the first sighting of the Falkland Islands by John Davis in 1592.
- Independence Day celebrates the independence of Pakistan from the United Kingdom in 1947.
- Partition Horrors Remembrance Day commemorates the victims and sufferings of people during the Partition of India in 1947.
