= West Saint Peak =

Mountain in Alaska, United States

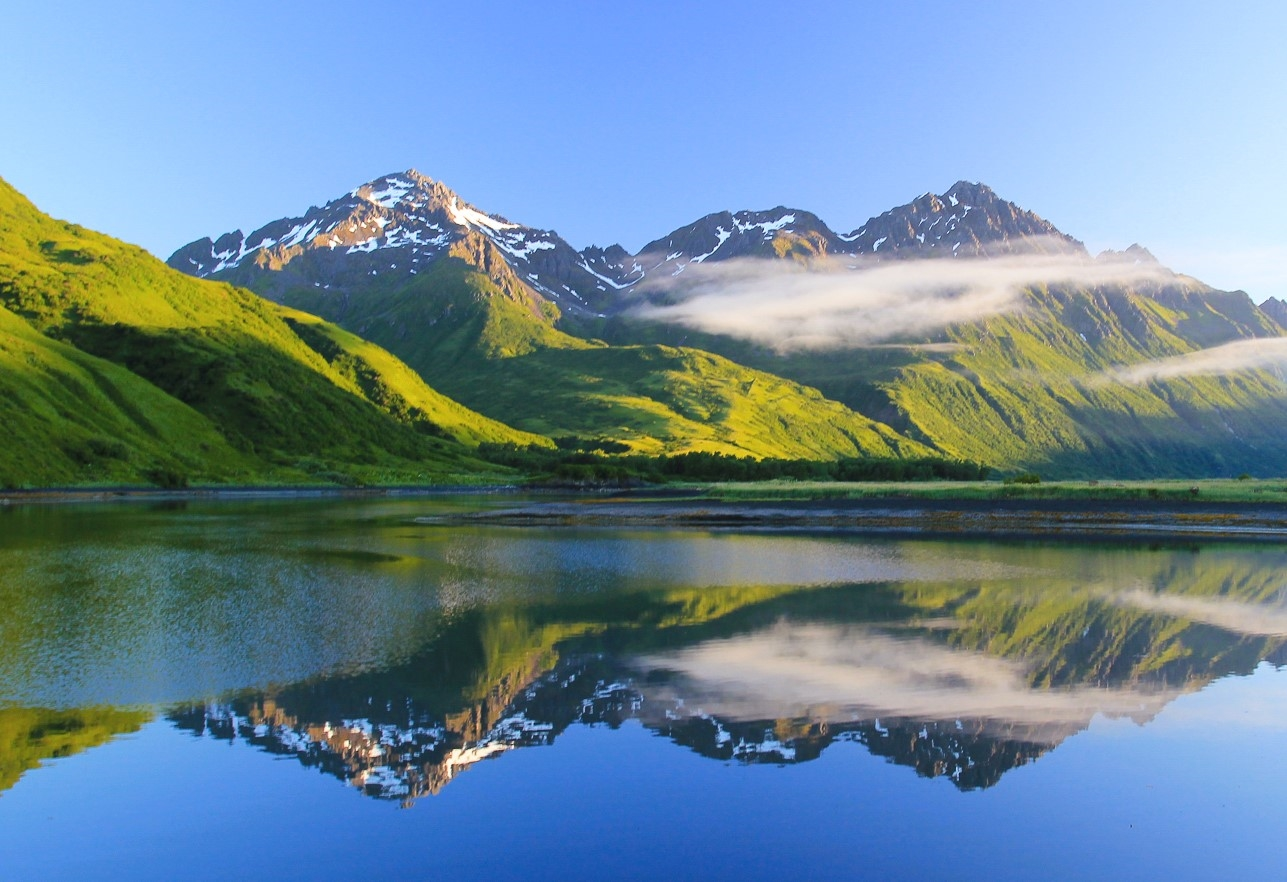
- West Saint Peak (left) and East Saint Peak (right) reflected in Three Saints Bay. View from southeast.

Highest point
- Elevation: 3,337 ft (1,017 m)
- Prominence: 1,787 ft (545 m)
- Isolation: 3.83 mi (6.16 km)
- Coordinates: 57°08′10″N 153°33′10″W

Geography
- Location within Alaska
- Country: United States
- State: Alaska
- Borough: Kodiak Island Borough
- Protected area: Kodiak National Wildlife Refuge
- Parent range: Kodiak Archipelago
- Topo map: USGS Kodiak A-5

West Saint Peak is a 3,337-foot-elevation (1,017-meter) summit in Alaska.

== Description ==
West Saint Peak is located 60 miles (97 km) southwest of Kodiak at Three Saints Bay on the southeastern coast of Kodiak Island. Precipitation runoff from the mountain drains into Three Saints Bay and topographic relief is significant as the summit rises 3,337 feet (1,017 meters) above the bay in approximately 1.5 miles (2.4 km). East Saint Peak (3,307 ft) is approximately one mile northeast of West Saint Peak. The two peaks were described and named in 1931 by the United States Geological Survey but the toponyms have not been officially adopted by the United States Board on Geographic Names. The peaks are named in association with Three Saints Bay, which was named by Grigory Shelikhov who established the first permanent Russian settlement in North America along the shore below the west peak in 1784. "Three Saints" was the name of Shelikhov's ship.

== Climate ==
According to the Köppen climate classification system, West Saint Peak is located in a subpolar oceanic climate zone with cold, snowy winters, and cool summers. Weather systems coming off the North Pacific are forced upwards by the mountains (orographic lift), causing heavy precipitation in the form of rainfall and snowfall. Winter temperatures can drop to 0 °F with wind chill factors below −10 °F.

== See also ==
- List of mountain peaks of Alaska
- Geography of Alaska
