= Frazer Lake =

Lake of the United States of America

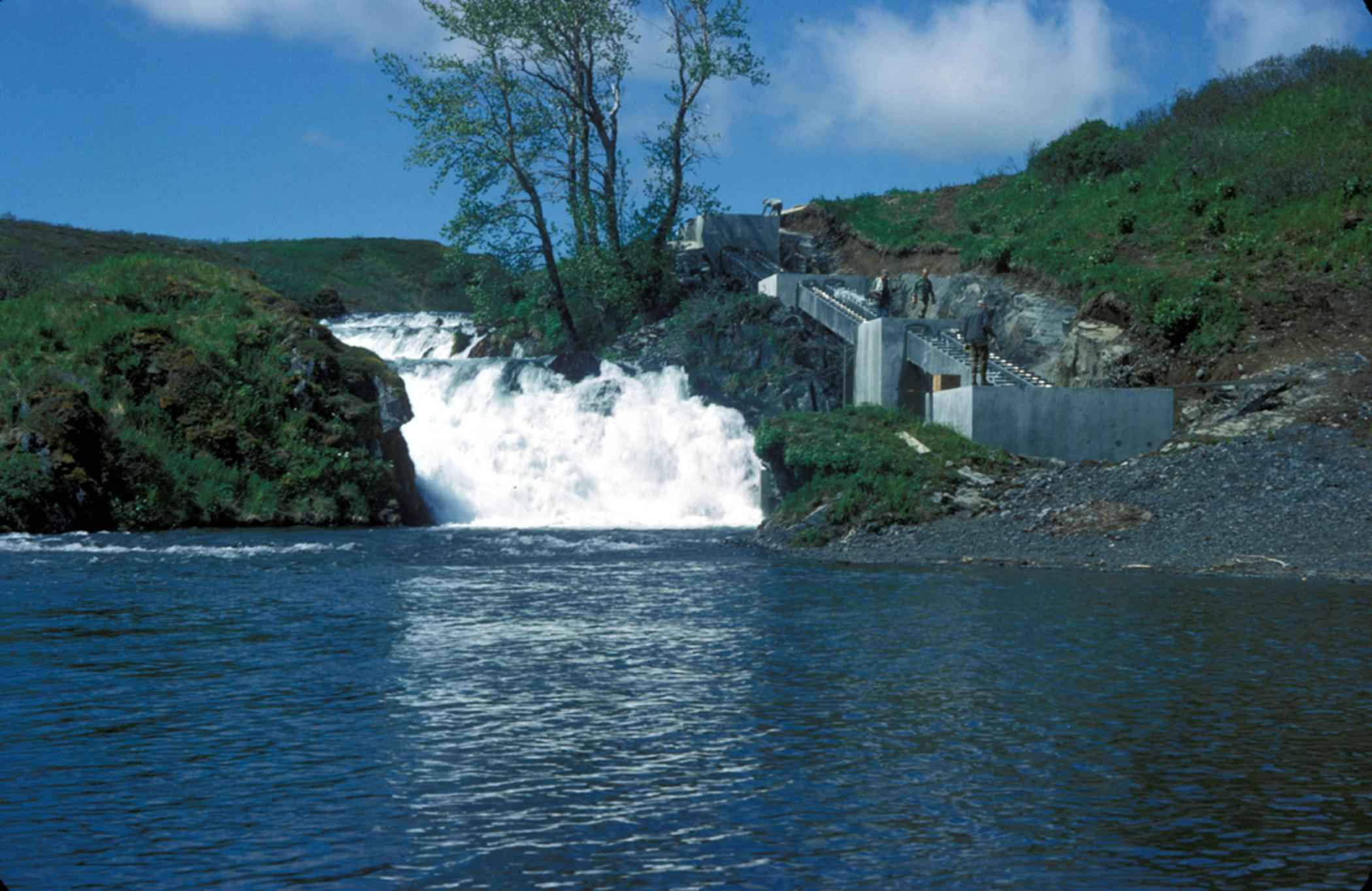

- Location within Alaska
- Location: Kodiak Island, Alaska
- Coordinates: 57°15′15″N 154°08′17″W
- Primary inflows: Numerous unnamed streams
- Primary outflows: Dog Salmon Creek
- Basin countries: United States
- Max. length: 9 mi (14 km)
- Max. width: 1 mi (1.6 km)
- Max. depth: 208 ft (63 m)
- Islands: 2 unnamed islets

Frazer Lake is a lake on Kodiak Island in Alaska, United States. It has no nearby settlements, being located in wilderness. The nearest populated place is Akhiok. Its outflow is Dog Salmon Creek.

Frazer Lake has been stocked with salmon since 1951, having been previously devoid of them due to a waterfall on Dog Salmon Creek obstructing their movement. The construction of a bob weir and fish ladder have allowed a productive fishery to rise.

== Geography ==
To the west, Frazer Lake is bordered by mountains that divide it from neighboring Red Lake and Akalura Lake. To the east, the lake is bounded by mountains dividing it from Karluk Lake. In the north, the lake receives water of an unnamed stream as its primary inflow. Dog Salmon Creek exits the south end of Frazer Lake, draining it into Olga Bay, putting its drainage at the opposite end of the lake as its larger neighbor, Karluk Lake. Frazer Lake has a maximum depth of 208 ft (63 m).
