= Karluk Lake =

Lake in the borough of Kodiak Island, Alaska, United States

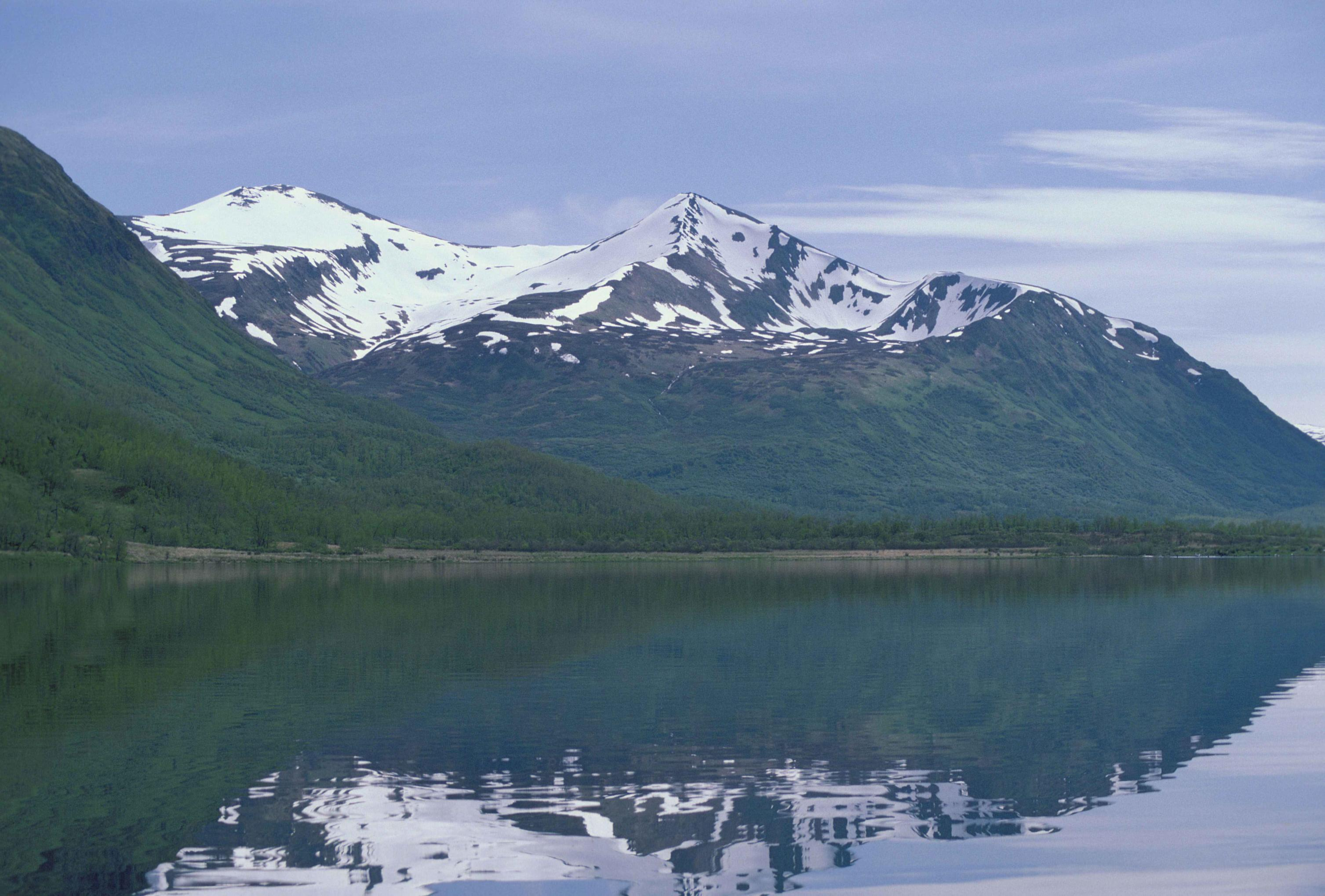
- Karluk Lake and mountains

- Location within Alaska
- Location: Kodiak Island, Alaska
- Coordinates: 57°22′N 154°03′W
- Primary inflows: O'Malley River, Thumb River
- Primary outflows: Karluk River
- Basin countries: United States
- Max. length: 12 mi (19 km)
- Max. width: 2 mi (3.2 km)
- Average depth: 159 ft (48 m)
- Max. depth: 457 ft (139 m)
- Islands: Camp Island

Karluk Lake, is a lake on Kodiak Island in Alaska, United States. It has no nearby settlements, being located in wilderness. Its outflow is the Karluk River.

Karluk Lake is located near the O'Malley River.

== Geography ==
Karluk Lake has a maximum depth of 457 feet (139 m). To the west, Karluk Lake is bordered by mountains that divide it from neighboring Frazer Lake. To the east, the bay is bounded by the adjacent Thumb Lake, and mountains dividing it from Uyak Bay. In the south, the lake receives the O'Malley River from the adjacent O'Malley Lake. The Karluk River exits the north end of Karluk Lake, draining it into the Shelikof Strait in the Gulf of Alaska.
