= Three Saints Bay =

Archaeological site in Alaska, United States

Coordinates: 57°8′8″N 153°29′45″W

- Three Saints Bay Site
- U.S. National Register of Historic Places
- U.S. National Historic Landmark
- Alaska Heritage Resources Survey
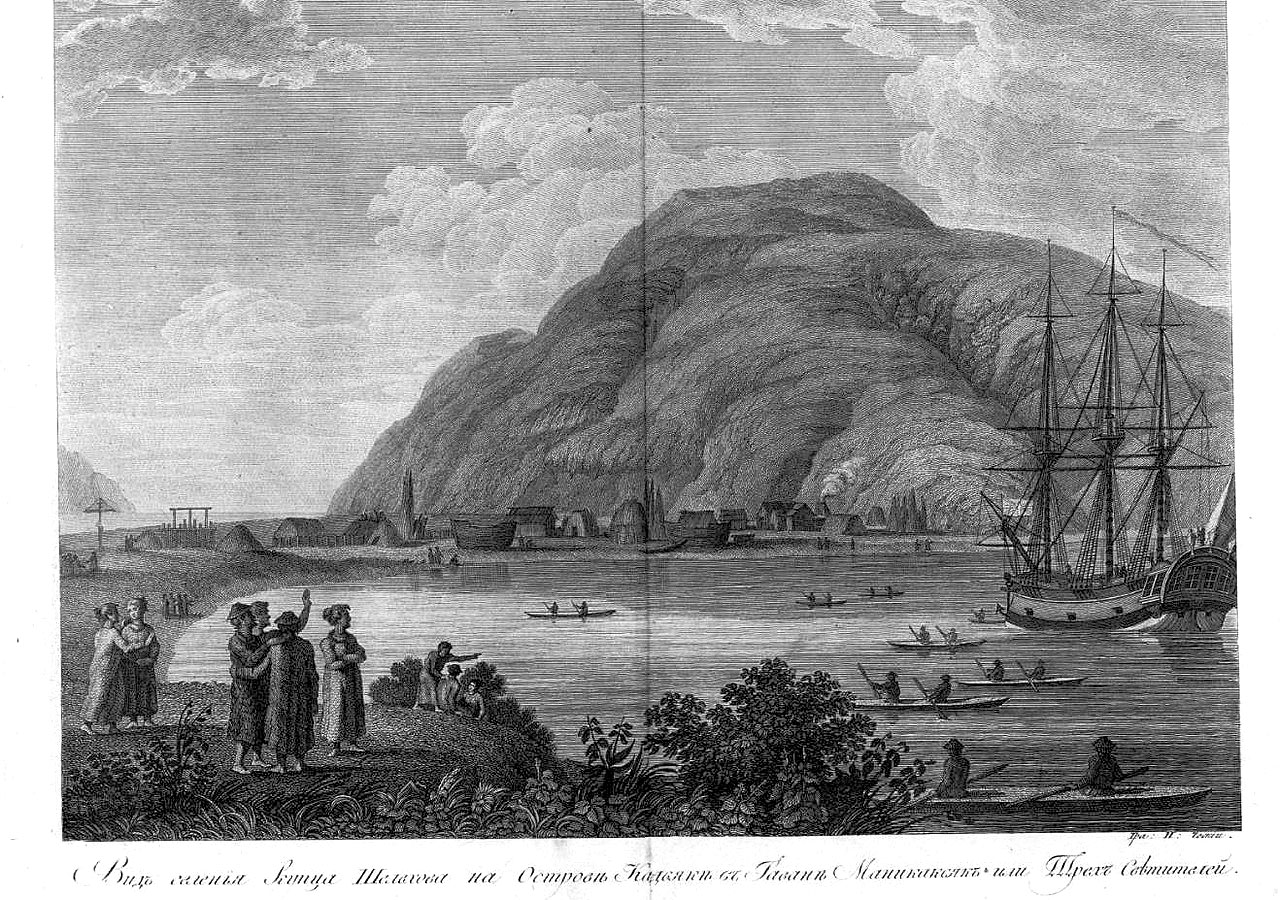
- 1802 lithograph engraving depicting the site
- Location: Address restricted
- Nearest city: Old Harbor, Alaska
- Built: 1784
- NRHP reference No.: 72001541
- AHRS No.: KOD-083

Significant dates
- Added to NRHP: February 23, 1972
- Designated NHL: June 2, 1978

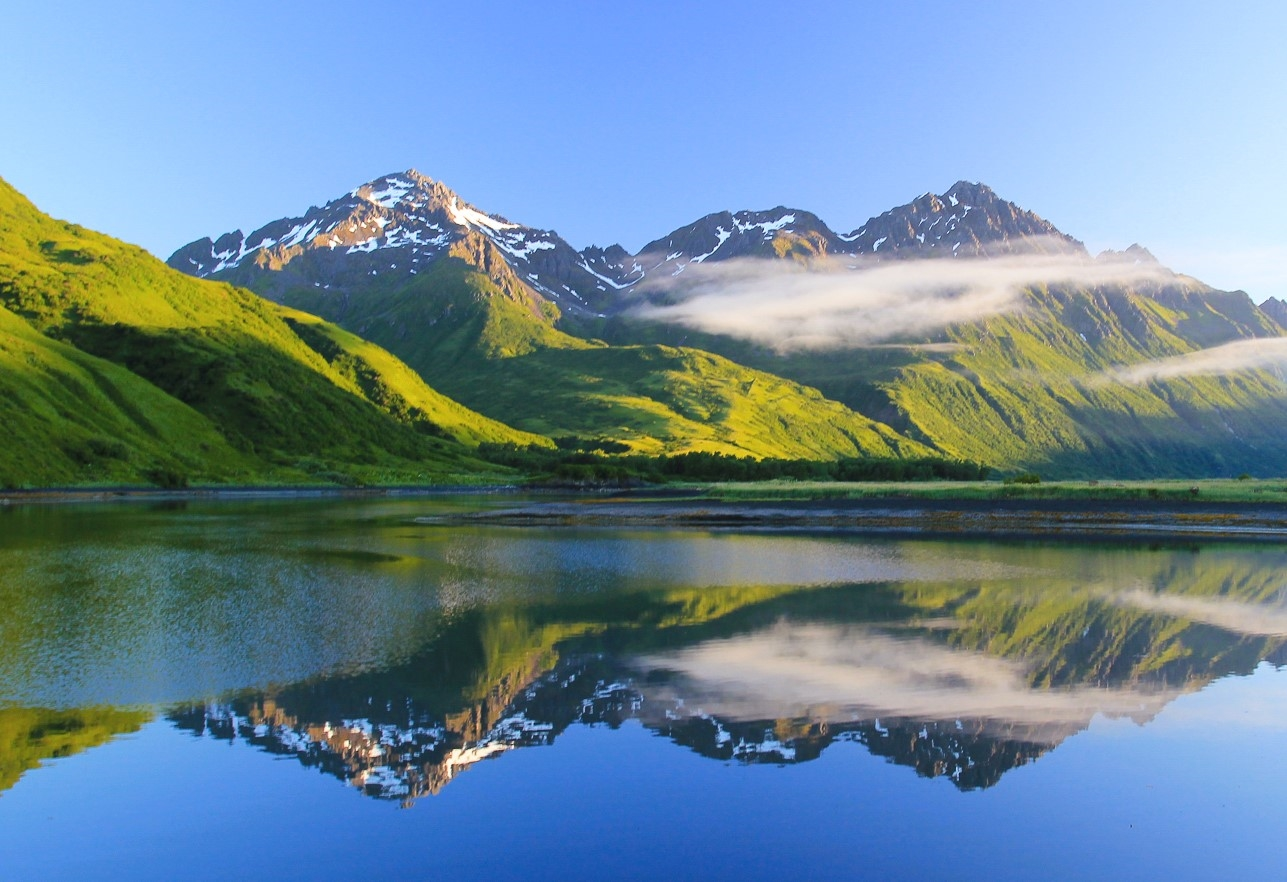
West Saint Peak (left) and East Saint Peak (right) reflected in Three Saints Bay

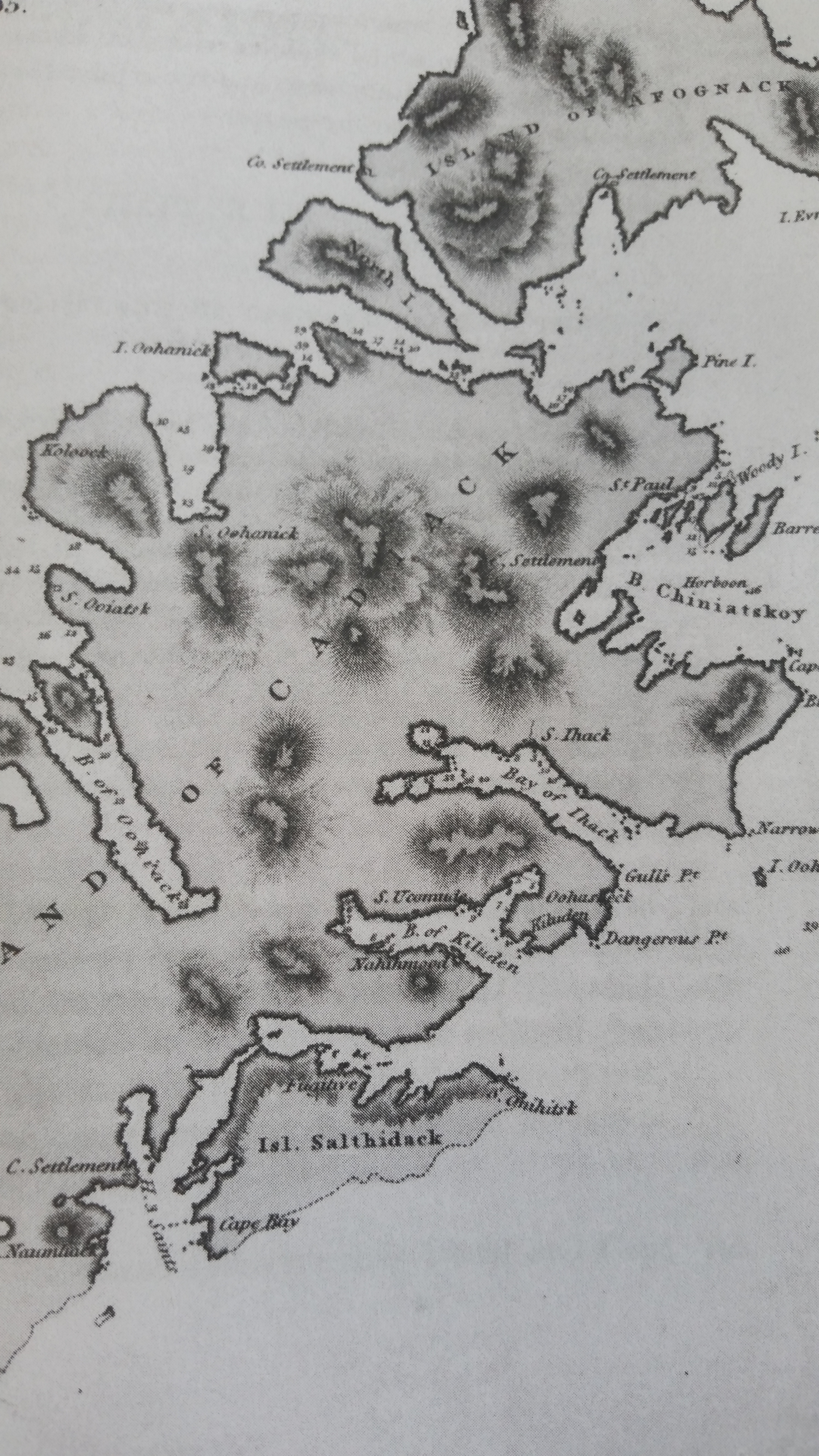
Location of Three Saints Bay and St. Paul on Kodiak in 1805

Three Saints Bay (Russian: Бухта Трёх Святителей, romanized: Bukhta Tryokh Svyatitelyej) is a 9-mile (14-kilometer)-long inlet on the southeast side of Kodiak Island, Alaska, north of Sitkalidak Strait. It is 60 mi (97 km) southwest of Kodiak. The Three Saints Bay Site is an archaeological site, the location of the first Russian settlement in Alaska, Three Saints Harbor (Гавань Трёх Святителей, Gavan’ Tryokh Svyatitelyej). The settlement was founded in 1784 by Grigory Shelikhov. The main settlement was moved in 1792 to Pavlovskaya Gavan (Павловская гавань – Paul's Harbor), now known as the city of Kodiak. The Three Saints Bay Site was declared a National Historic Landmark by the United States in 1978.

== History ==
Although Russian fur hunters had established temporary shore stations in Alaska earlier, they intended the Three Saints site to be a permanent colonial settlement. The site was poorly chosen, for the hillside above the shore area was too steep to build on, and the shore area was too small for a substantial settlement. When it was visited in 1790, it was described as a cluster of small structures (probably barabaras), with a population of about fifty men and a small number of women. The site was harmed by subsidence and a probable tsunami in the wake of a 1788 earthquake. In 1791, Alexander Baranov began moving the main Russian settlement to the site of present-day Kodiak.

This original Russian site continued to be occupied as a smaller station of lesser importance until roughly the mid-19th century, at which time it was relocated to a site about 1.2 miles (1.9 km) away.

Only a few remnants of the Russian occupation remain on the surface. These are mainly pits and rectangular depressions, indications of where structures were located, and some plants that are evidence of the small-scale agriculture which was practiced there. The settlement's cemetery was located to its southeast. Excavation at the site yielded evidence that it was built on the site of an older native settlement, dating to c. 100 BCE.

The Russian settlement site was listed on the United States National Register of Historic Places in 1972, and was designated a National Historic Landmark in 1978.

== Etymology ==
The bay was named for the harbor, in turn named after one of Shelikhov's ships, (Три Святителя) [Three Saints], for the Three Holy Hierarchs. It was reported by Petroff in the 10th Census in 1880.

The same area was later called Lyakhik Bay (залив Ляхик, Zaliv Lyakhik) by Captain Tebenkov. This was based on its Aleut name Liakik, probably from liak ("black-footed goose").

== See also ==
- Awa'uq Massacre
- Maritime Fur Trade
- List of National Historic Landmarks in Alaska
- National Register of Historic Places listings in Kodiak Island Borough, Alaska
