= Karluk River =

River in Alaska, the United States of America

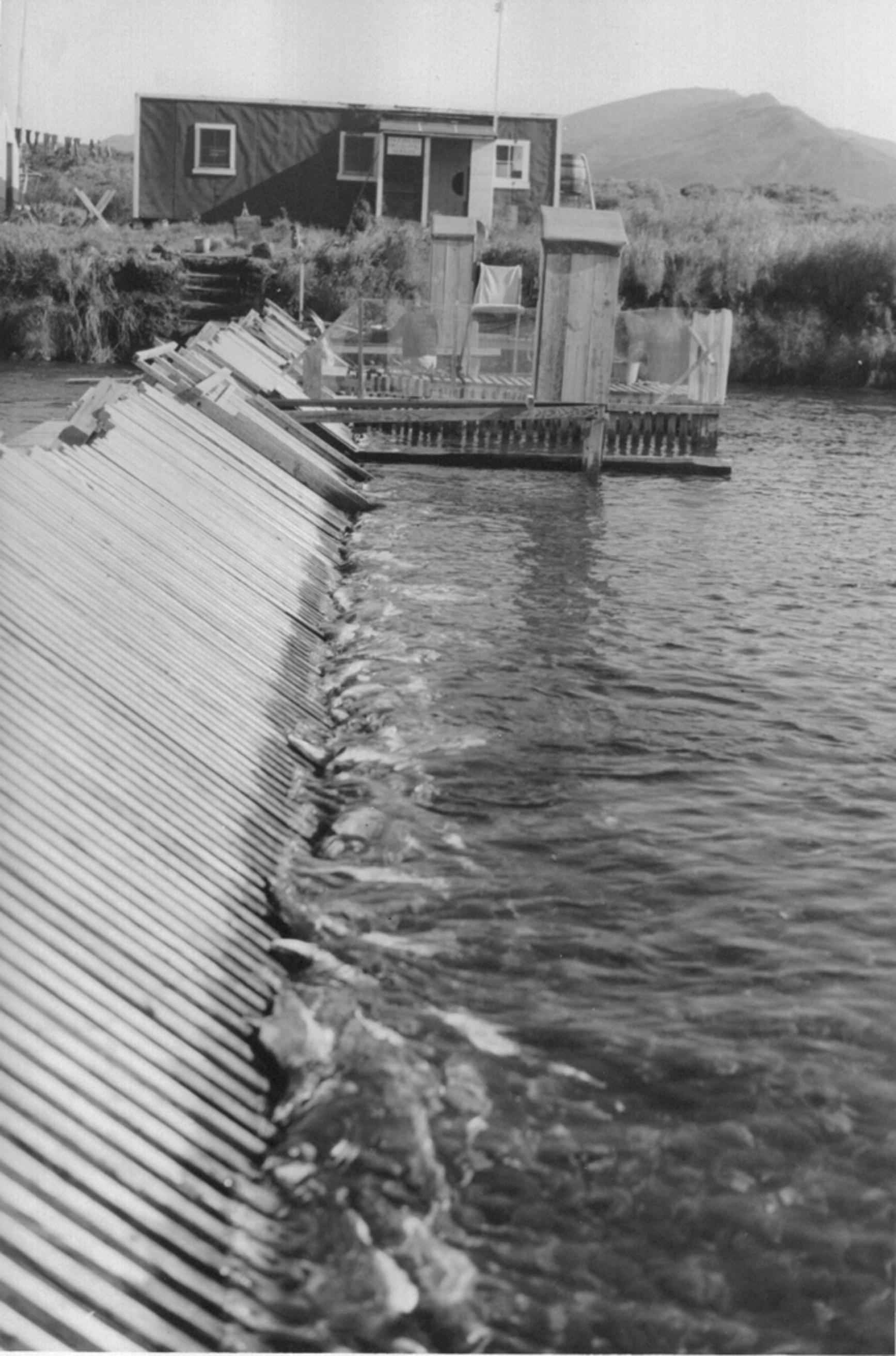
- Weir on the Karluk River

- Location of the mouth of the Karluk River in Alaska

Location
- Country: United States
- State: Alaska
- Borough: Kodiak Island

Physical characteristics
- Source: Karluk Lake
  - coordinates: 57°26′30″N 154°06′26″W
  - elevation: 388 ft (118 m)
- Mouth: Shelikof Strait
  - location: Karluk
  - coordinates: 57°34′18″N 154°27′44″W
  - elevation: 0 ft (0 m)
- Length: 24 mi (39 km)

The Karluk River is a stream, 24 miles (39 km) long, on Kodiak Island in the U.S. state of Alaska. It begins at Karluk Lake in the Kodiak National Wildlife Refuge and flows north and then northwest through Karluk Lagoon to the Shelikof Strait at Karluk.

Sportfishing is popular in this river basin, "the largest and most productive" on Kodiak Island. It has significant runs of sockeye salmon, Coho, pink, Chinook, and chum salmon, and steelhead, and Dolly Varden trout are also prevalent. The entire main stem, rated Class I (easy) on the International Scale of River Difficulty, is floatable by raft or kayak.

== See also ==
- List of rivers of Alaska
