= Henrik Johan Holmberg =

Finnish naturalist, geologist and ethnographer

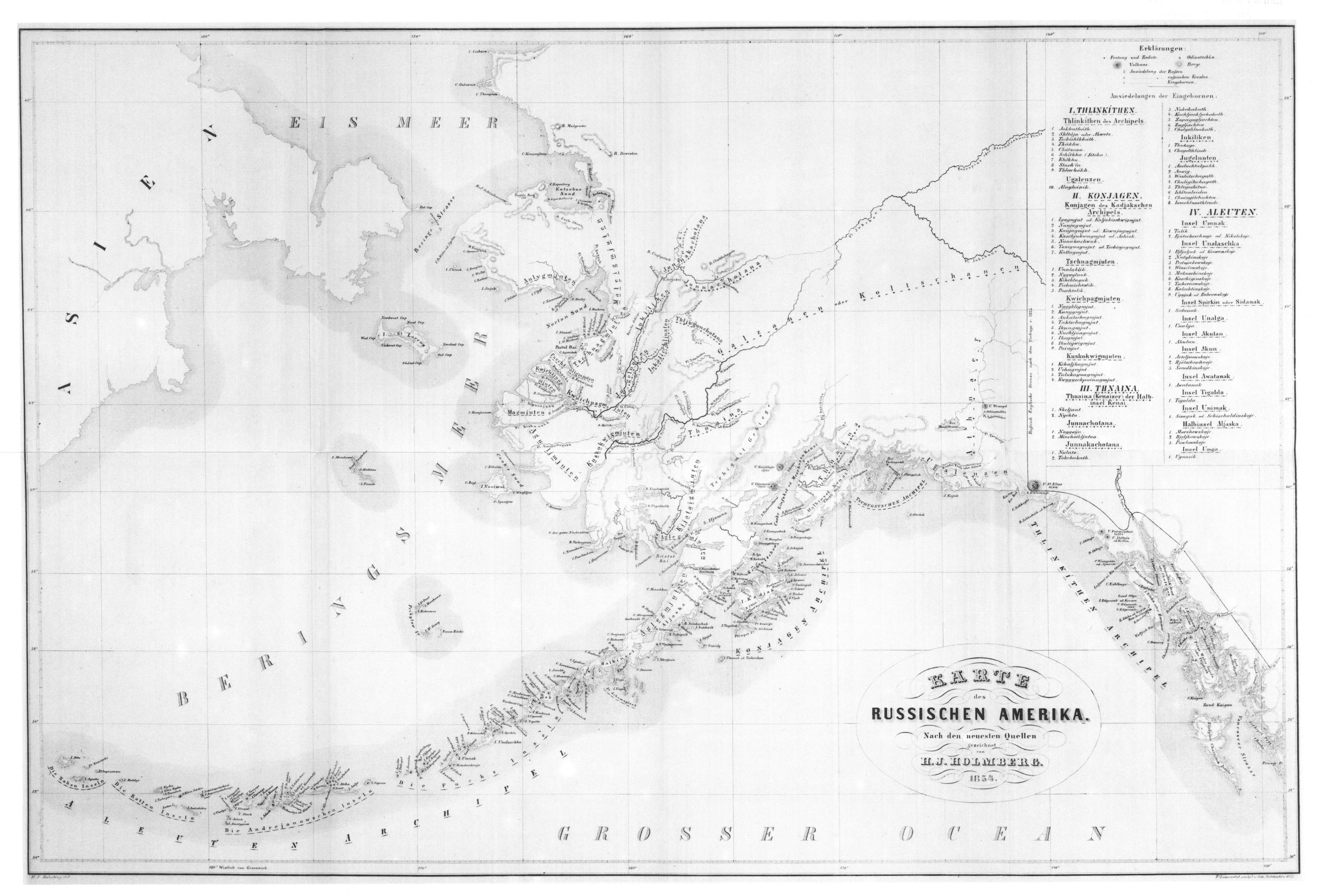
- H[einrich] J[ohan] Holmberg (1854). Karte des Russischen Amerika (Map of Russian America). In Ethnographische Skizzen uber die Völker des Russischen Amerika.
- Born: 3 January 1818; Kökar, Åland
- Died: December 23, 1864 (aged 46); Helsinki, Uusimaa
- Other names: Heinrich Johann Holmberg
- Education: University of Helsinki

Henrik Johan Holmberg or Heinrich Johann Holmberg (3 January 1818 in Kökar – 23 December 1864 in Helsinki) was a Finnish naturalist, geologist (mineralogist) and ethnographer. He was the first recorder of the Awa'uq Massacre in the Russian America of Shelikhov-Golikov Company. Henrik Holmberg followed in 1851 to document an evolved origin story and several other stories as told by Arsenti Aminak (his memory of Russian conquest at Awa’uq that Aminak survived as a young boy).

In 1839 he became a student of the Mining Inspectorate of Finland, in 1841 was registered as an extra conductor and in 1850 went to pan for gold to Russian America. There Holmberg assembled a rich collection of natural history specimens and studied local languages and ethnography of Alaska Natives (as Die Konjagen = Koniag Alutiiq of Kodiak, Die Thlinkithen = Tlingit, Die Thnaina = Dena'ina of Kenai). After his return to Finland in 1852 he issued "Etnographische Skizzen über die Völker des russischen Amerika" (in Acta Societatis Scientiarum Fennicae. 1856: Vol. 4, 1863: Vol. 7), later - Mineralogischer Wegweiser durch Finland (1857) and Materialien zur Geognosie Finlands (1858). Holmberg worked in the historical museum of the Helsinki University and published a description of the Finnish archaeological finds from the Neolithic and Bronze Age, List and illustrations of Finnish antiquities (1863), the first detailed work on this subject.

== Taxonomic honors ==
- Trachypachus holmbergi Mannerheim, 1853.

== Original publications ==
- Geognostische Bemerkungen auf einer Baidarkenfahrt um die Insel Kadjak: Augeführt im Sommer 1851 (1853)
- Ethnographische Skizzen über die Völker des russischen Amerika I–II (1855–1862)
- Mineralogischer Wegweiser durch Finnland I–II (1857)
- Materialier till Finlands geognosi I–II (1858)
- Förteckning och afbildningar af finska fornlemningar I–II (1859–1863)
- Katalog öfver Kejserliga Alexanders-Universitetets Etnografiska Samlingar (1859)
