= Madre María Rosa =

18th-century nun

María Rosa
- Born: Josefa de Léon y Ayala; January 14, 1660; Madrid, Spain
- Died: August 14, 1716 (aged 56); Lima, Peru
- Other name: Madre María Rosa
- Occupation: Mother abbess
- Known for: Documenting own travel, founding first Capuchin convent in Lima, Peru
- Notable work: Account of the Journey or Journey of Five Capuchin Nuns

Maria Rosa was a Capuchin nun from Madrid, Spain. She left Spain in 1712 with four other founding nuns to Lima, Peru to establish a new Capuchin convent. She was an example of the early modern women who were a part of the expansion of the Atlantic world. Her documentation of her journey is the oldest known travel document written by a woman. It was very atypical for a woman to be literate much less travel to the New World. During the Council of Trent, nuns were strictly enclosed within the walls of their convents. The only exception to this being for the founding of new convents. Her account of her journey is a valuable insight to a pious woman's interpretation of the world outside of the cloistered walls of a covenant and proof that a woman, particularly one tied down by a strict Catholic council, had a burning spirit of mission with “equal flame” to those of so many men in Catholic Europe.

== Biography ==
Not much is known about María. She was born in Madrid on January 14, 1660. Her parents were Joseph de Leon y Ayala and Estefania Muñoz. Her given name was Josepha de Leon y Ayala but changed it to Maria Rosa when she became a nun. This was a customary practice. She entered the Capuchin covenant at the age of seventeen in 1677. She was appointed first mother abbess of the new convent to be founded in Lima. Because of this, she left Spain never to return again in 1712 with four other founding nuns. She documented her whole journey almost day by day to leave her account for both her original convent back in Madrid and the new one in Lima. One month before her death, she stepped down from her position and her co-founder, María Gertrudis was elected abbess. She died August 14, 1716 at the age of fifty-six.

== Journey ==
María Rosa's journey across the Atlantic Ocean was full of remarkable adventures and adversities. Her account of it was the first known travel document written by a woman. The need for a new convent in Lima came from the efforts of a group of religious lay women who were living together to become Capuchin nuns. The Capuchin order in Madrid was selected to send five nuns to found the new nunnery. The five original founders were: Madre María Rosa (abbess), Madre Maria Estefania (vicaress), Madre Maria Gertrud's (turn keeper), Madre Maria Bernarda (novice mistress) and Madre Josepha Victoria (council member). Journey took total of three years; it was delayed on Iberian Peninsula for two of those years when they were captured by the Dutch enemy. Their journey was incredibly dangerous due to the Spanish War of Succession that was underway at the time making a long, traitorous trip like theirs that much more difficult. The nuns were likely exposed to ideas and books about New World during their imprisonment in the Iberian Peninsula. A “tapestry of influences” in María's manuscripts is evident, this was probably due to other documented accounts of similar travels found and available for reading in different convents she may have stayed in during her pilgrimage to the new world. Maria Rosa took it upon herself to chronicle daily events of their travels so that their future sisters in Peru and back in Spain could trace the footsteps of their pilgrimage. This manuscript is special because it is read through Maria's narration, and proves that women played and active role in colonial enterprise. Her writing is “lively and multilayered”. It allows for reconsideration of assumptions about early modern religious women. They weren't so bland and tasteless clearly since María's narrative style had personality and sass. Since nuns were mandated to be strictly enclosed in the walls of their convents, with barely any communication to the outside world, Maria's experience was extraordinary and impressive and even more so since she documented it thoroughly. The sophistication of her account is impressive, Maria like most religious women of her time, had only informal mechanisms of education and this was probably only due to the fact that she was a nun and probably born of elite class already prior to joining her convent. But most women were not literate at all at this time. Typically the only women who could were nuns so they were able to read scriptures and teach new incoming sisters how to read and write. Women were often oppressed and silenced when successful which was probably why her writings were never discovered or reverenced as they are today. Sarah Owens found the original manuscripts of María's account in the National Library in Madrid and decided it was a wonderful story of “travel and adventure” that had to be published. Because of this series, María Rosa's experiences are now accessible to scholars, students, and anyone interested in early women's history.

== Bibliography ==
- Drenas, Andrew Joseph Giguere (2014). 'The Standard-bearer of the Roman Church' : Lorenzo da Brindisi (1559-1619) and Capuchin Missions in the Holy Roman Empire. ora.ox.ac.uk (DPhil thesis). University of Oxford. OCLC 909816241. EThOS uk.bl.ethos.635295.
- Gelbart, Nina Rattner. The King’s Midwife: A History and Mystery of Madame Du Coudray. United States: University of California Press, 1999.
- Judith M. Bennett... [et al.]. Sisters and Workers in the Middle Ages. Edited by Judith M. Bennett, Elizabeth A. Clark, and Jean F. O’Barr. Chicago: University of Chicago Press, 1989.
- Lavrin, Asunción. “Indoctrination, Conversion, and Belief in the Colonial Iberian World.” Latin American Research Review 46, no. 3 (2011): 181–90. doi:10.1353/lar.2011.0048
- Leonard, Amy. Nails in the Wall: Catholic Nuns in Reformation Germany. United States: University of Chicago Press, 2005.
- Maria Rosa, Madre. Journey of Five Capuchin Nuns. 1st ed. Edited by Sarah Owens. Toronto: Iter Inc., 2010.
- Perry, Mary Elizabeth E. The Handless Maiden: Moriscos and the Politics of Religion in Early Modern Spain. United States: Princeton University Press, 2005.
- Rosa, María. Journey of Five Capuchin Nuns – Scholars Portal Books. 2014. Accessed March 31, 2016. http://books2.scholarsportal.info/viewdoc.html?id=/ebooks/ebooks2/iter/2011-06-22/1/9780772720559-vol1.
- http://www.olacapuchins.org
- http://www.lucidez.pe/cultura/el-monasterio-capuchino-de-jesus-maria-y-jose-de-lima/
