= Sitkalidak Island =

Island in the Gulf of Alaska

Coordinates: 57°07′37″N 153°10′46″W

Sitkalidak Island (Russian: Ситкалидак) is an island in the western Gulf of Alaska in the Kodiak Island Borough of the state of Alaska, United States. It lies just off the southeast shore of Kodiak Island, across the Sitkalidak Strait from the city of Old Harbor. The island has a land area of 300 square kilometers (120 sq mi) and no resident population.

== Alutiiq Tribe ==
The Awa'uq Massacre or Refuge Rock Massacre, Wounded Knee of Alaska was a 1784 massacre of native Alutiiq people on Refuge Rock (Awa'uq in Alutiiq language) by Russian fur trader Grigory Shelikhov. The Russians slaughtered 500 (or 2000) men, women and children on Refuge Rock. This massacre was an isolated incident, and the Alutiiq were completely subjugated by Russian traders thereafter.

A community nonprofit, the Old Harbor Alliance, was formed by the Alutiiq Tribe of Old Harbor, the city of Old Harbor and the Old Harbor Native Corporation. In 2017, they acquired a free-ranging herd of plains bison and released them on the island.
