= Awa'uq Massacre =

1784 massacre in Alaska

- Part of the Russian colonization of the Americas and the American Indian Wars
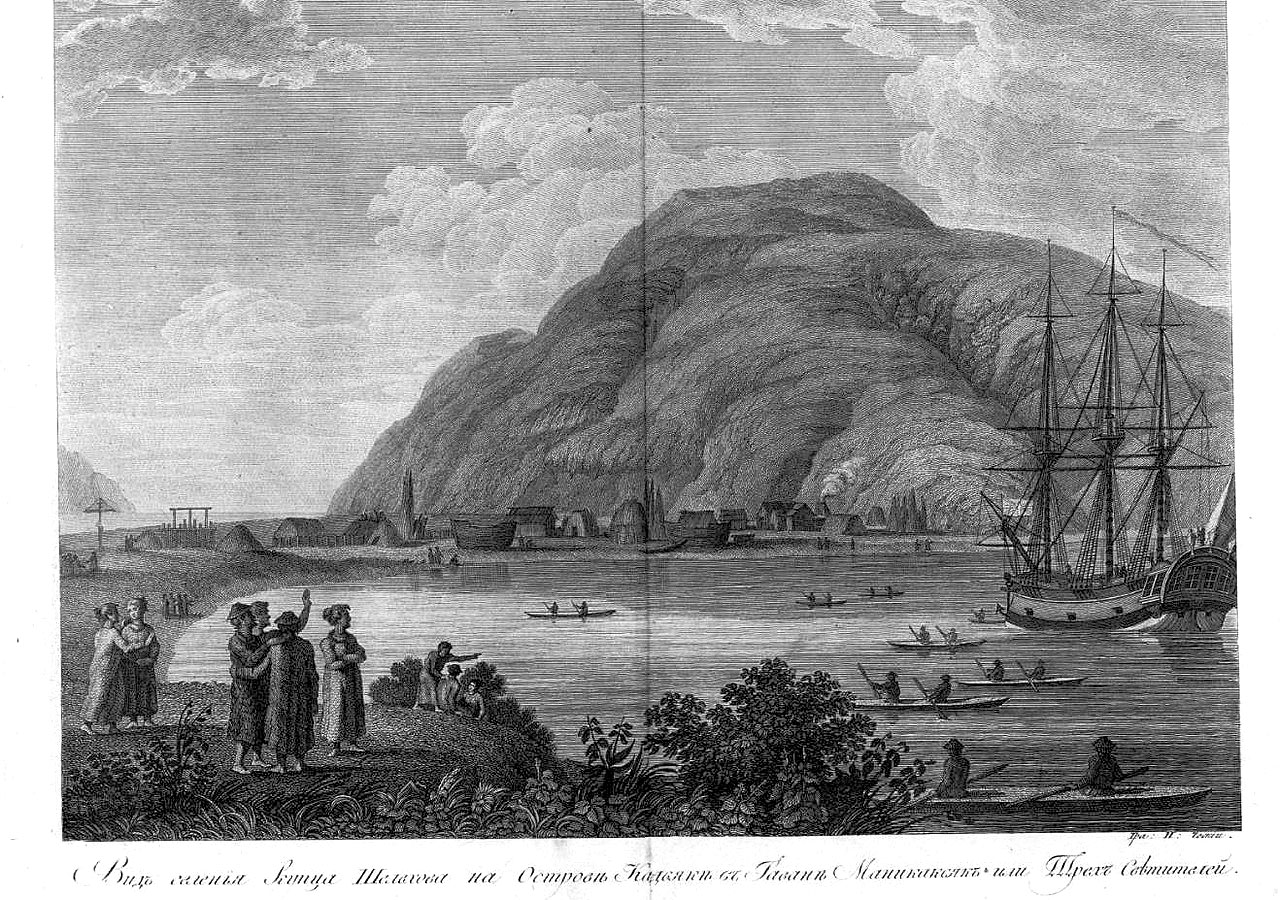
- Grigory Shelikhov's settlement is depicted in this 1802 lithograph. Three Saints was founded in 1784 just across the strait from Sitkalidak Island.
- Date: 14 August 1784
- Location: Sitkalidak Island, Alaska, Russian America; 57°06′22″N 153°05′00″W

Parties
Koniag Alutiiq people (Qik’rtarmiut Sugpiat)	Russian fur traders of Shelikhov-Golikov Company

Lead figures
none	Grigory Shelikhov

Number
4,000	130

Casualties and losses
200–3,000 killed	no casualties

The Awa'uq Massacre or Refuge Rock Massacre, or more recently known as the Wounded Knee of Alaska, was an attack and massacre of Koniag Alutiiq (Sugpiaq) people in August 1784 at Refuge Rock near Kodiak Island by Russian fur trader Grigory Shelekhov and 130 armed Russian men and cannoneers of his Shelikhov-Golikov Company.

== Massacre ==
Since 1775, Shelekhov had been trading with Alaska Natives in the Kuril and Aleutian islands of present-day Alaska. In April 1784, he returned to found a settlement on Kodiak Island and the coast of the mainland. According to Shelekhov, the Koniag Alutiiq had driven off previous landing attempts by the Russians in 1761 and 1774, but this time he had 130 armed Russians at his disposal.

The people occupying the area attempted to drive off the Russian landing attempt, and fled to the secluded stack island Refuge Rock (Awa'uq in Alutiiq language, approximate meaning 'where one becomes numb') of Partition Cove on Sitkalidak Island. It was across Old Harbor in the Kodiak Archipelago.

The Russian promyshlenniki attacked the people on the island by shooting guns and cannons, slaughtering an estimated 200 to 500 men, women and children on Refuge Rock. Some sources state the number killed was as many as 2,000, or 3,000 persons. Following the attack of Awa'uq, Shelekhov claimed to have captured over 1,000 people, detaining some 400 as hostages, including children. The Russians suffered no casualties.

This massacre was an isolated incident, but the violence and taking of hostages resulted in the Alutiiq becoming completely subjugated by Russian traders thereafter. Qaspeq (literally: "kuspuk"), was an Alutiiq (Sugpiaq) who had been taken as a child as a hostage from Kodiak; he was raised in servitude by the Russians in the Aleutians. Having learned Russian, he became an interpreter for them with the Alutiiq. Qaspeq had once betrayed the location of a refuge island just offshore of Unalaska Island.

More than five decades after the massacre, Arsenti Aminak, an old Sugpiaq man who had survived the massacre, reported his account of these events to Henrik Johan Holmberg (sometimes known as Heinrich Johann) (1818–1864), a Finnish naturalist and ethnographer. Holmberg was collecting data for the Russian governor of Alaska.

Aminak said:

The Russians went to the settlement and carried out a terrible blood bath. Only a few [people] were able to flee to Angyahtalek in baidarkas; 300 Koniags were shot by the Russians. This happened in April. When our people revisited the place in the summer the stench of the corpses lying on the shore polluted the air so badly that none could stay there, and since then the island has been uninhabited. After this every chief had to surrender his children as hostages; I was saved only by my father's begging and many sea otter pelts.

== Aftermath ==
The years 1784–1818 were called the "darkest period of Sugpiaq history," as the Russians treated the people badly. They also suffered high mortality from infectious diseases unwittingly introduced by the Russians. In 1818 there was a change in the management of what was then known as the Russian-American Company, referring to Russians operating in North America.

Native population of Southwestern Alaska,1741 to 1834 (Based on estimates and Russian-American Company censuses)
year	Aleutian Islands (= Aleut ~ Unangan)	Kodiak Island, Cook Inlet, Prince William Sound (= Alutiiq ~ Sugpiaq)	Kodiak Island only (= Koniag Alutiiq)	Cook Inlet, Prince William Sound only (= Chugach Sugpiaq)
1741	8,000
1784		10,000
1791	6,000		6,510	599
1804			4,850
1806	1,898
1813	1,508
1817			4,098	2,544
1821	1.700
1834	2,000

Fur harvests of Shelikhov-Golikov and Russian-American Company
	1797–1821	Average/yr 1797–1821	1821–1842	Average/yr 1821–1842
Sea otters	72,894	2,916	25,416	1,210
Beavers	34,546	1,382	162,034	7,716
River otters	14,969	599	29,442	1,402
Fur seals	1,232,374	49,295	458,502	21,833
Foxes	102,134	4,085	90,322	4,301
Sables	17,298	692	15,666	746
Wolverines	1,151	46	1,564	74
Lynx	1,389	56	4,253	203
Minks	4,802	192	15,481	737
Polar foxes	40,596	1,624	69,352	3,302
Wolves	121	5	201	10
Bears	1,602	64	5,355	255
Sea lions	27	1	Ø	0
Walrus tusks (poods = 36 pounds)	1,616	65	6,501	310
Baleen (poods = 36 pounds)	1,173	47	3,455	165

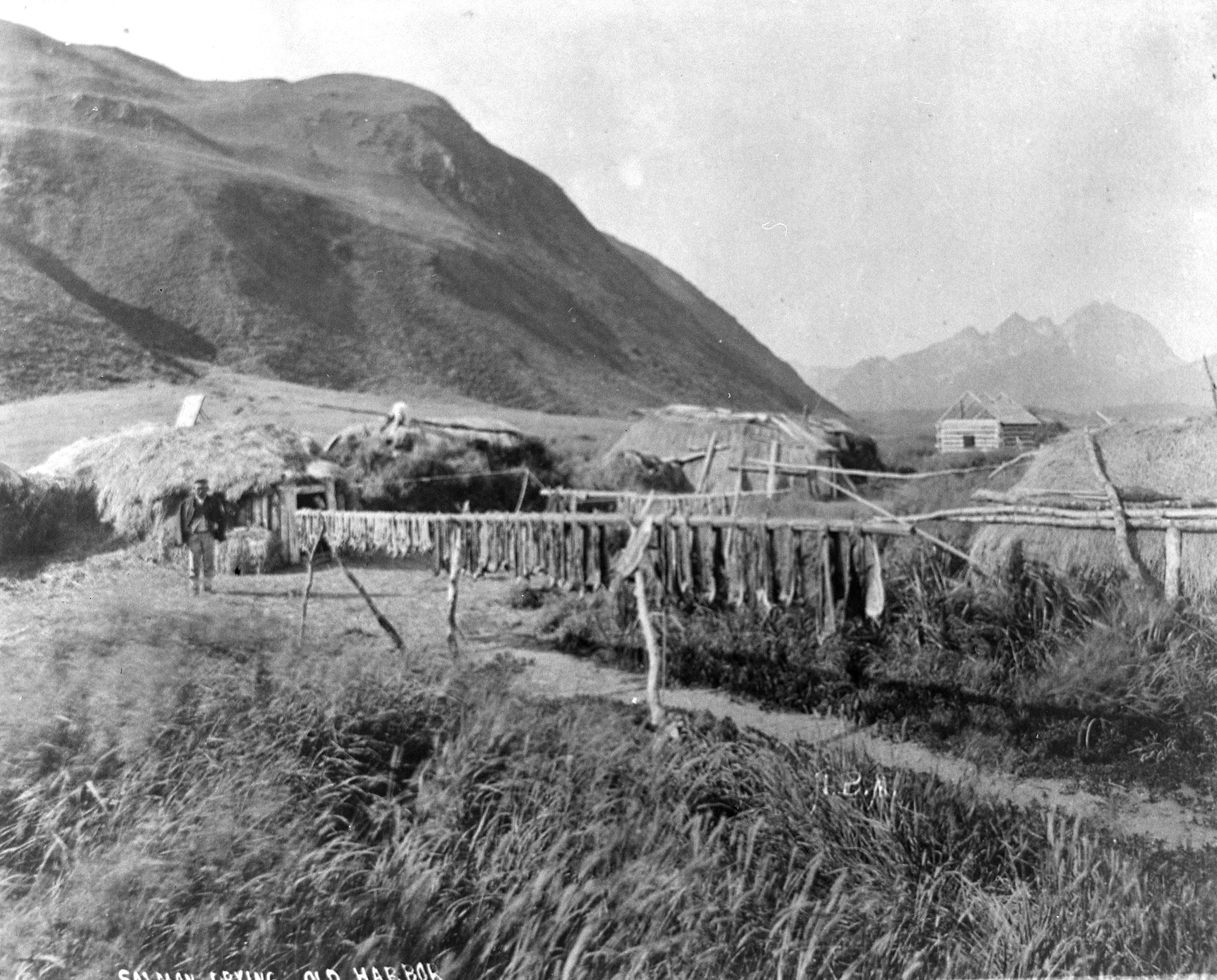
An Alutiiq (Sugpiaq) village in Old Harbor, Alaska in 1889, with Oncorhynchus salmon hung up for drying
