= Grigory Shelikhov =

Russian seafarer, merchant, and fur trader (1747–1795)

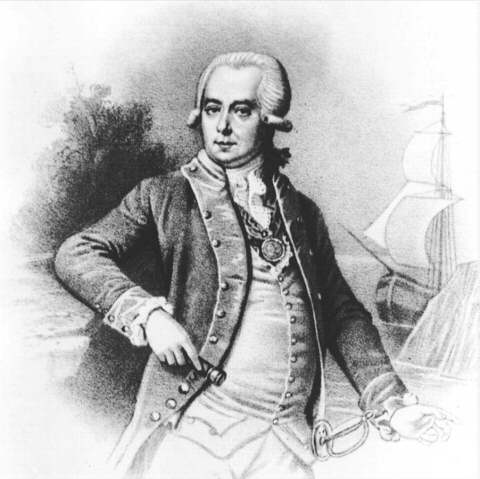
Grigory Shelikhov was a founder of the predecessor of the Russian-American Company

Grigory Ivanovich Shelikhov (Russian: Григорий Иванович Шелихов; 1747 in Rylsk, Belgorod Governorate – July 31 [O.S. July 20] 1795) was a Russian seafarer, merchant, and fur trader who established a permanent settlement in Alaska. He and his forces were responsible for the 1784 Awa'uq Massacre.

== Career ==
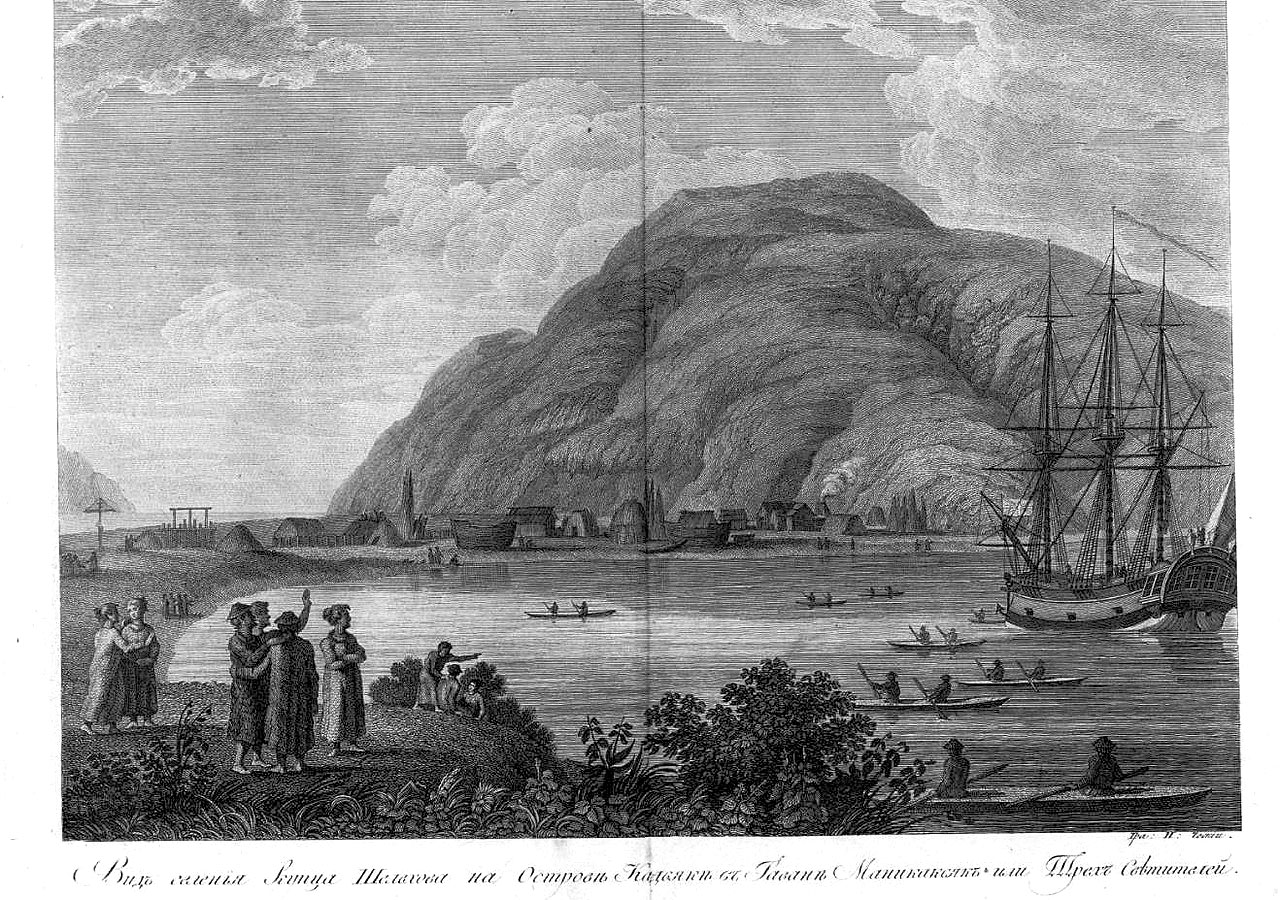
The settlement of Grigory Shelekhov in Kodiak Island

Starting in 1775, Shelikhov organized voyages of merchant ships to the Kuril Islands and the Aleutian Islands, in what is now Alaska, for fur trading.

=== Shelikhov-Golikov Company ===
In 1783–1786, he led an expedition to the coastal shores of the mainland, where they founded the first permanent Russian settlements in North America. Shelikhov's voyage was done under the auspices of his Shelikhov-Golikov Company, founded in 1783 in partnership with Ivan Larionovich Golikov. This company was the predecessor of the Russian-American Company, which was founded in 1799.

=== Refuge Rock Massacre ===
In April 1784, Shelikhov arrived in what he named as Three Saints Bay on Kodiak Island with two ships, the Three Hierarchs, Basil the Great, Gregory the Theologian and John Chrysostom and the St. Simon. The indigenous Koniaga, an Alutiiq nation of Alaska Natives, defended themselves from the Russian party at Refuge Rock of Partition Cove on Sitkalidak Island. In what became known as the Awa'uq Massacre, Shelikhov and his armed forces, who had guns and cannons, killed hundreds of the Alutiiq, including women and children. They also took hundreds of hostages, many of them children, to force submission by other Alaska Natives. Having established his authority on Kodiak Island, Shelikhov founded the first permanent Russian settlement in Alaska along the island's Three Saints Bay. Unalaska had been established long before, but it was not considered the permanent base for Russians until Shelikhov's time.

=== Russian-American Company ===
In 1790, Shelikhov, having returned to Russia, hired Alexandr Baranov to manage his fur trading enterprise in Russian America.

In 1799 the assets of Shelikhov-Golikov Company were merged with the royal Russian-American Company under its 'Correspondent' Nikolai Rezanov, who was Shelikhov's son-in-law.

== Legacy ==
A gulf in the Sea of Okhotsk, a strait between Alaska and Kodiak Island, a bay on Kruzof Island (near Sitka, Alaska), and a town in Irkutsk Oblast in Russia bear Shelikhov's name. Shelekhov travelled via Shelikhov Bay in the Sea of Okhotsk in December 1786 to January 1787, after he had been left behind at Bol’shereck in Kamchatka as the winds tore the Three Hierarchs from her anchors and carried her out to sea.

There is a statue of Shelikhov in his native Rylsk.

== Family ==
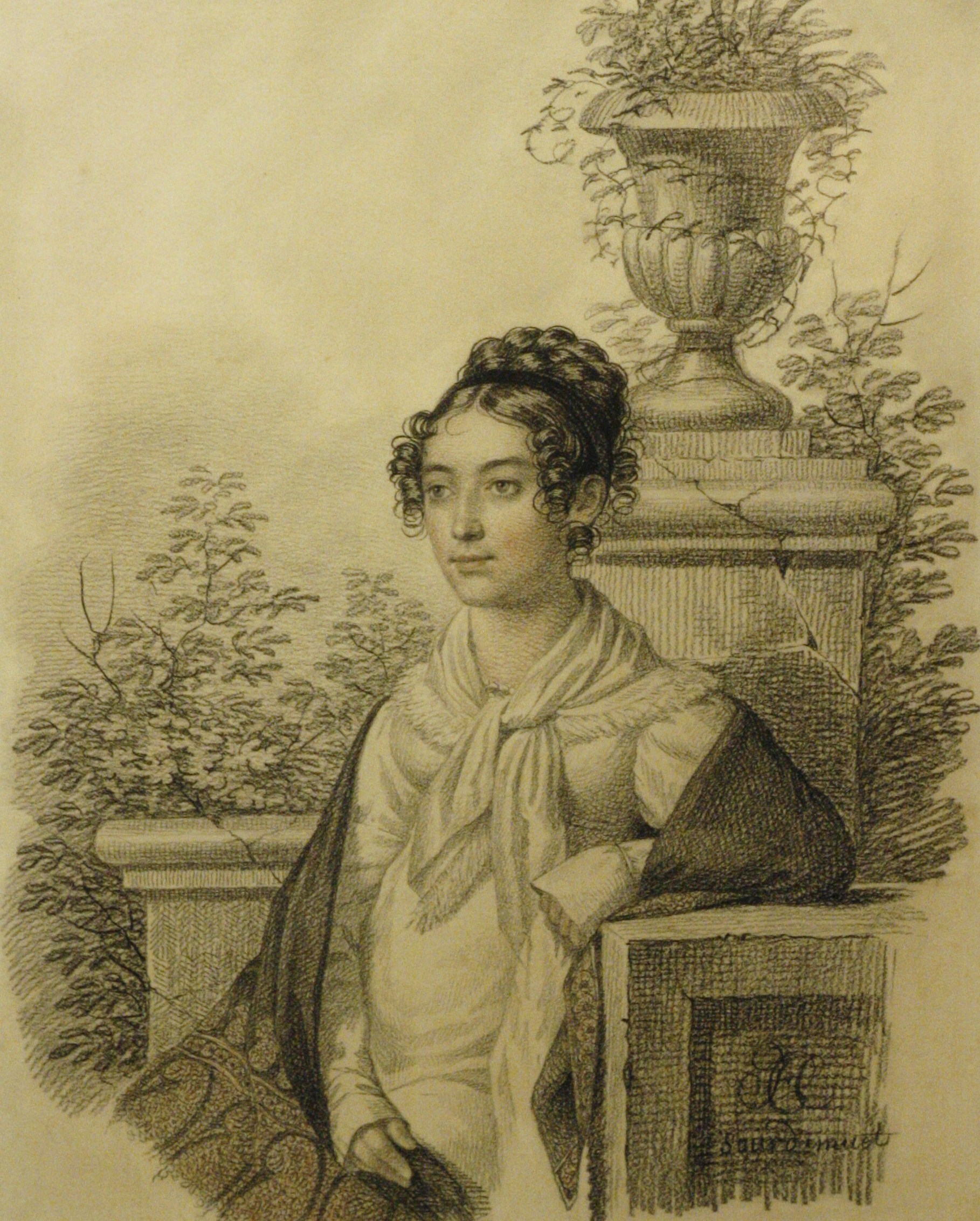
Shelikhov's granddaughter Olga Nikolaevna Kokoshkina by Karl Hampeln

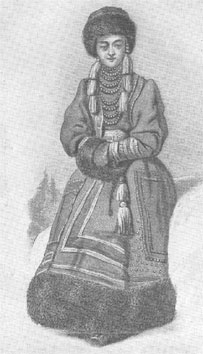
Grigory's wife Natalia Alekseevna Shelikhova

His father was Ivan Shelikhov. Ivan had a brother, Andrei, who had at least two children: Semen Andreevich Shelikhov and Sidor Andreevich Shelikhov.

Grigory had two siblings: a sister, Agrofena Ivanova Shelikhova, and a younger brother, Vasilii Ivanovich Shelikhov, who went to Siberia with Grigory to assist with the business.

In 1775 Shelikhov married Natalia Alexeyevna Kozhevina, the daughter of a prominent clan of Okhotsk navigators and mapmakers and their wives. At his death he had five surviving daughters and one son.

Grigory and Natalia had the following children:

- Anna Grigorevna Rezanova, b. 1780
- Ekaterina Grigorevna Timkovskaya, c. 1781
- Avdotia Grigorevna Buldakova, b. 1784
- Aleksandra Grigorevna Politkovskaya, b. 1788
- Natalia Grigorevna Shelikhova, b. 1793
- Katerina Grigorevna Shelikhova
- Vasilii Grigorevich Shelikhov

His 14-year-old daughter Anna married Nikolai Rezanov in January 1795. She died in childbirth seven years later, but had at least one surviving daughter, Olga Nikolaevna Rezanova, who married Kharkiv Governor-General Sergey Aleksandrovich Kokoshkin.

== See also ==
- Daikokuya Kōdayū, a Japanese castaway in Russia

Government offices
Preceded by new post	Governor of Shelikhov-Golikov Company; 1784 – 22 May 1786	Succeeded by Konstantin Alekseevich Samoilov
