= Kodiak Island =

Island off the coast of Alaska, United States

Kodiak
Native name: Qikertaq, Кадьяк Nickname: Emerald Isle
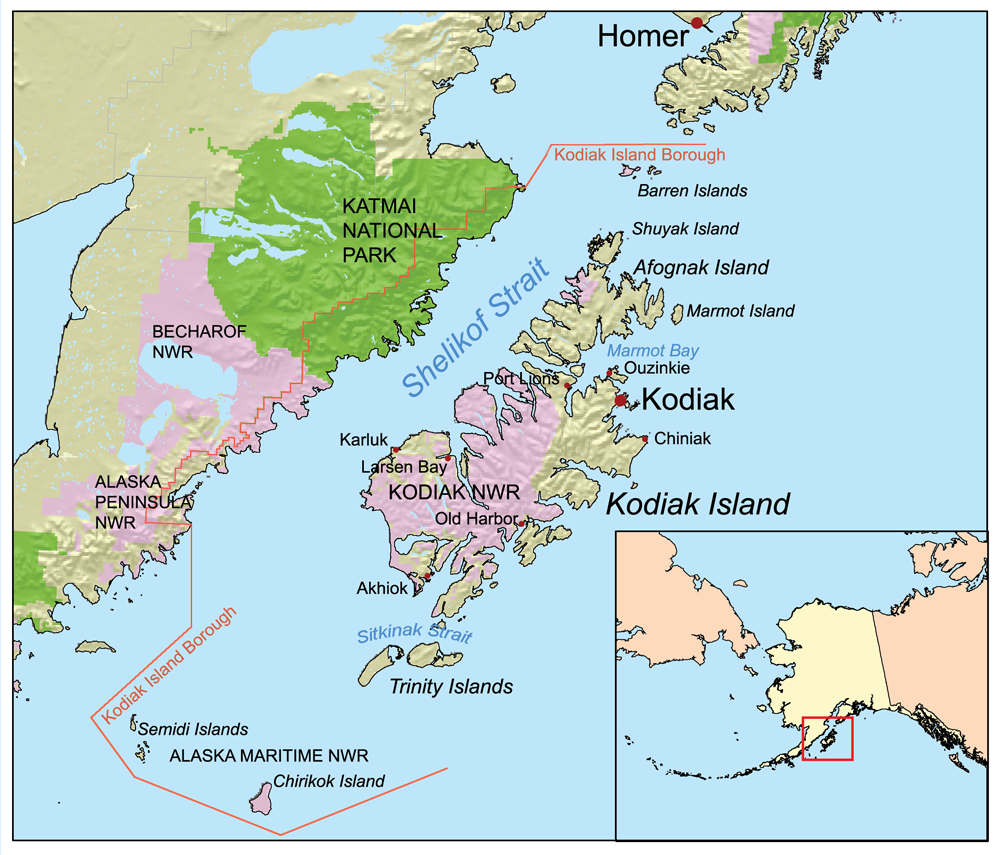

- Location within Alaska
- Interactive map of Kodiak

Geography
- Location: Pacific Ocean
- Coordinates: 57°28′N 153°26′W
- Archipelago: Kodiak Archipelago
- Total islands: 25
- Area: 3,595.09 sq mi (9,311.2 km^{2})
- Highest elevation: 4,469 ft (1362.2 m)
- Highest point: Koniag Peak

Administration
- United States
- State: Alaska
- Borough: Kodiak Island
- Largest settlement: Kodiak (pop. 5,581)

Demographics
- Population: 13,101 (2020 Census)
- Pop. density: 3.64/sq mi (1.405/km^{2})
- Ethnic groups: Alutiiq, European, Filipino other Asian and Indigenous peoples, Hispanics, including Filipino Hispanics

Kodiak Island (Alutiiq: Qikertaq; Russian: Кадьяк, romanized: Kadyak) is a large island on the south coast of the U.S. state of Alaska, separated from the Alaska mainland by the Shelikof Strait. The largest island in the Kodiak Archipelago, Kodiak Island is the second largest island in the United States and the 80th largest island in the world, with an area of 3,595.09 sq mi (9,311.2 km^{2}), slightly larger than Cyprus. It is 160 km (99 miles) long and in width ranges from 16 to 97 kilometers (10 to 60 mi). The largest community on the island is the city of Kodiak, Alaska.

Kodiak Island is mountainous and heavily forested in the north and east, but fairly treeless in the south. The island has many deep, ice-free bays that provide sheltered anchorages for boats. The southwestern two-thirds of the island, like much of the Kodiak Archipelago, is part of Kodiak National Wildlife Refuge.

Kodiak Island is part of the Kodiak Island Borough and Kodiak Archipelago of Alaska. The town of Kodiak is one of seven communities on Kodiak Island and is the island's main city. All commercial transportation between the island and the outside world goes through this city either via ferryboat or airline. Other settlements include the villages of Akhiok, Old Harbor, Karluk, Larsen Bay, Port Lions, and an unorganized community near Cape Chiniak. The village of Ouzinkie on nearby Spruce Island is also part of the island community.

Kodiak is also home to the largest U.S. Coast Guard base, which includes Coast Guard Base Kodiak, Coast Guard Air Station Kodiak, Communications Station Kodiak, and Aids to Navigation Station Kodiak. The island is also home to the Pacific Spaceport Complex.

The Kodiak bear and the king crab are native to the island. The fishing industry is the most important economic activity on the island; fisheries include Pacific salmon, Pacific halibut, and crab. The Karluk River is famous for its salmon run. Logging, ranching, numerous canneries, and some copper mining are also prevalent.

An antenna farm at the summit of Pillar Mountain above the city of Kodiak provides primary communications to and from the island.

== History ==
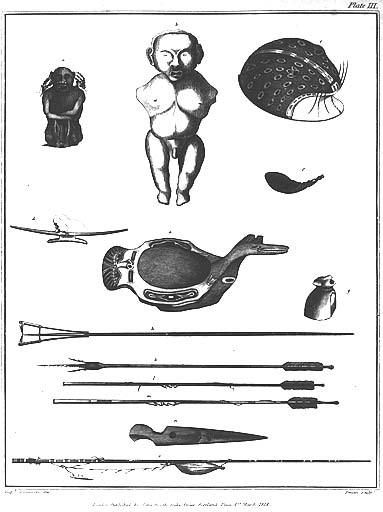
Native artifacts from the Kodiak Islands, engraving c. 1805 from a Russian journal

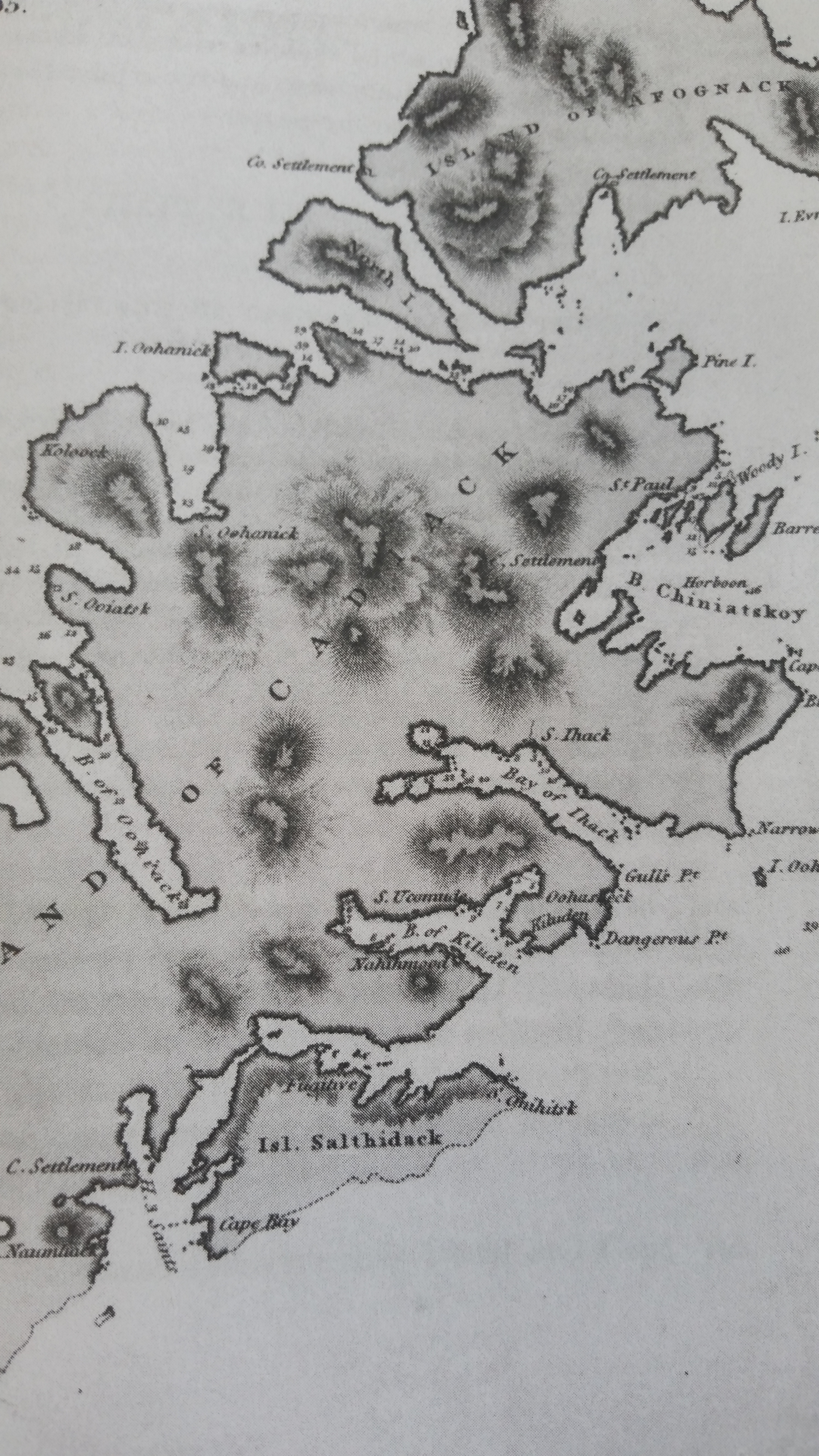
Location of Three Saints Bay and St. Paul on Kodiak in 1805

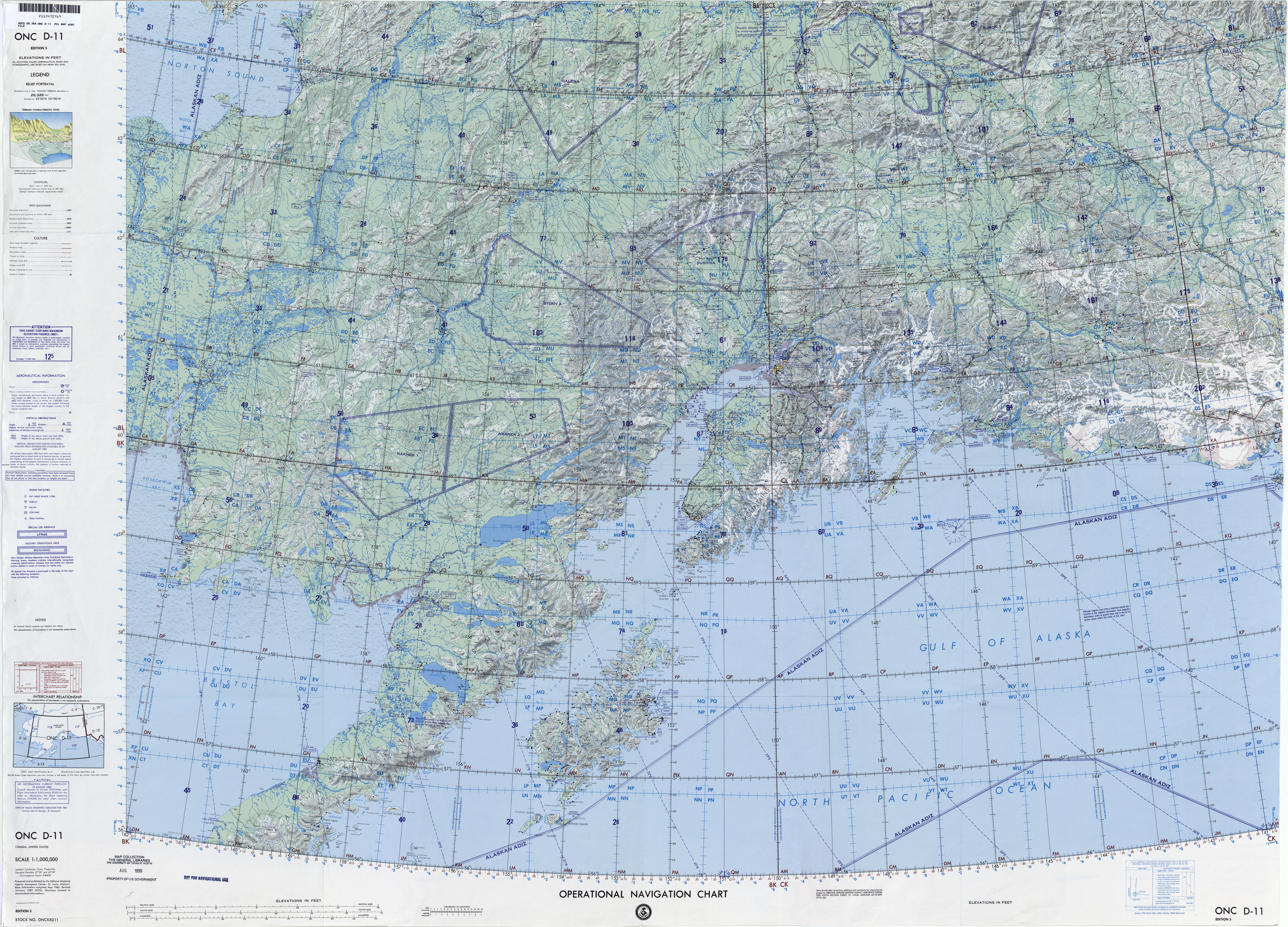
Chart including Kodiak Island

Kodiak is the ancestral land of the Sugpiaq, an Alutiiq nation of Native Americans. The original inhabitants subsisted by hunting marine mammals, fishing, and gathering. The European discoverer of Kodiak Island was the Russian fur trader Stepan Glotov (1793).

The first outsiders to settle on the island were Russian explorers under Grigory Shelikhov, a fur trader, who founded a Russian settlement on Kodiak Island at Three Saints Bay in 1784; the present-day village of Old Harbor developed near there. In 1792, the settlement was moved to the site of present-day Kodiak and became the center of Russian fur trading with the Alaska Natives.

In 1793, Grigory Shelikhov, with the help of the governor-general of Irkutsk, was given twenty craftsmen and ten families of farmers with the obligation of paying government taxes for them, for promoting successful development of Russia-America settlements and the establishment of shipyards and factories. The settlers provided to Shelikhov were not serfs in the full sense of the word. It was not possible to sell, mortgage, or give away the settlers; they were owned by the company for as long as the Shelikhov-Golikov Company existed.

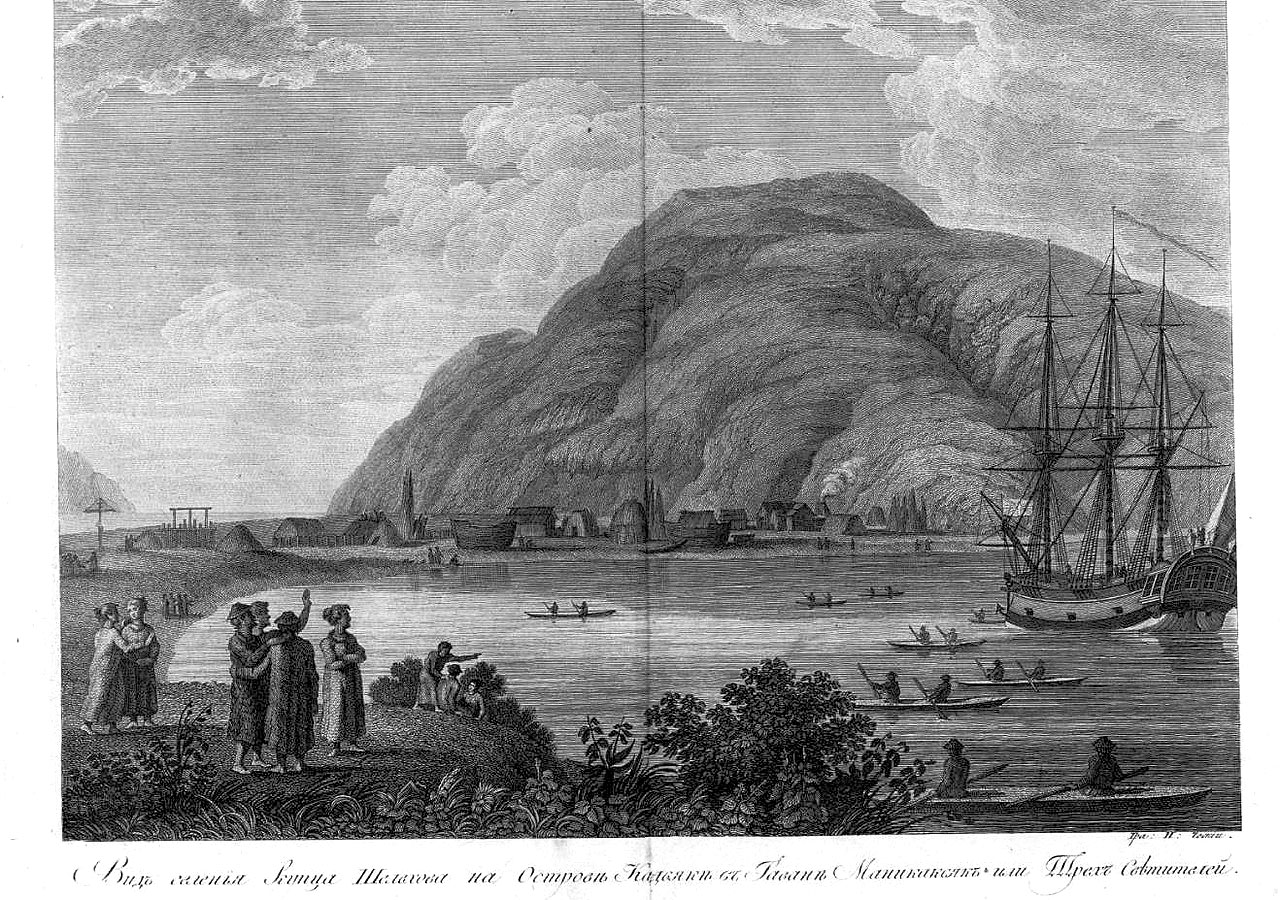
The settlement of Grigory Shelikhov on Kodiak Island.

In 1784, Shelikhov, along with 130 Russian fur traders, massacred (see Awa'uq Massacre) several hundred Qik’rtarmiut Sugpiat ("Sugpiaq people of Qik’rtaq/Kodiak") tribe of Alutiiq men, women and children at Refuge Rock, a tiny stack island off the eastern coast of Sitkalidak Island. In Alutiiq, this sacred place is now known as Awa'uq, "to become numb".

The Alutiiq were conscripted by the Russian occupants for the purpose of hunting, gathering, and processing food and furs. Native labor was commandeered through hostage taking, physical threat, and punishment. The Alutiiq men were forced to obtain quotas of otter pelts and bird skins which were then stitched into waterproof parkas by the Alutiiq women. The waterproof garments, made by the Alutiiq women, were given to the Alutiiq men as payment for the furs brought to the Russian fur traders.

The Orthodox mission in Russian America was authorized by Catherine II in 1793, and then was established on Kodiak Island in 1794 by a group of monks from the Valaam Monastery in Saint Petersburg.

The Russian fur traders radically expanded sea otter hunting operations and forced the Alutiiq men to hunt for longer periods of time at increasingly distant areas as the local population of fur-bearing animals was extinguished. The Alutiiq suffered starvation and physical separation of families because of the able-bodied men hunting and trapping furs rather than providing food for the women, young, old, and sick as they had done traditionally.

In 1837–1839, a smallpox epidemic swept through all the Russian America territory and destroyed an estimated one-third of the Native population. The remaining Alutiiq on Kodiak Island were then consolidated into seven settlements where they were more readily offered medical, educational, and religious services by the Russian-American Company. The smallpox epidemic was eventually stopped with vaccination of the natives.

Following the 1867 Alaska Purchase by the United States, the island became part of the United States. Gradually Americans settled there, also engaging in hunting and fishing.

=== 1912 Novarupta eruption ===
Novarupta is a volcano 100 miles (160 km) northwest of Kodiak Island that erupted from June 6 to June 8, 1912: the largest eruption in the 20th century. Life on Kodiak Island was immobilized during the 60-hour eruption. Darkness and suffocating conditions caused by the falling ash and sulfur dioxide gas rendered villagers helpless with sore eyes and respiratory problems. Water became undrinkable. Radio communications were disrupted and visibility was nil. Roofs in the village collapsed under the weight of more than a foot of ash. Buildings were destroyed as avalanches of ash rushed down from nearby hillsides.

On June 9, Kodiak villagers saw the first clear, ash-free skies in three days, but their environment had changed dramatically. Wildlife on Kodiak Island was devastated by ash and acid rain from the eruption. Bears and other large animals were blinded by thick ash, and many starved to death because large numbers of plants and small animals were smothered in the eruption. Birds blinded and coated by volcanic ash fell to the ground. Even the region's prolific mosquitoes were exterminated. Aquatic organisms in the region perished in the ash-clogged waters. Salmon in all stages of life were destroyed by the eruption and its aftereffects. From 1915 to 1919, southwestern Alaska's salmon-fishing industry was devastated.

=== 1964 earthquake ===
The island was also hit by the 1964 Good Friday earthquake and tsunami, which destroyed much of the waterfront, the business district, and several villages.

== Climate ==
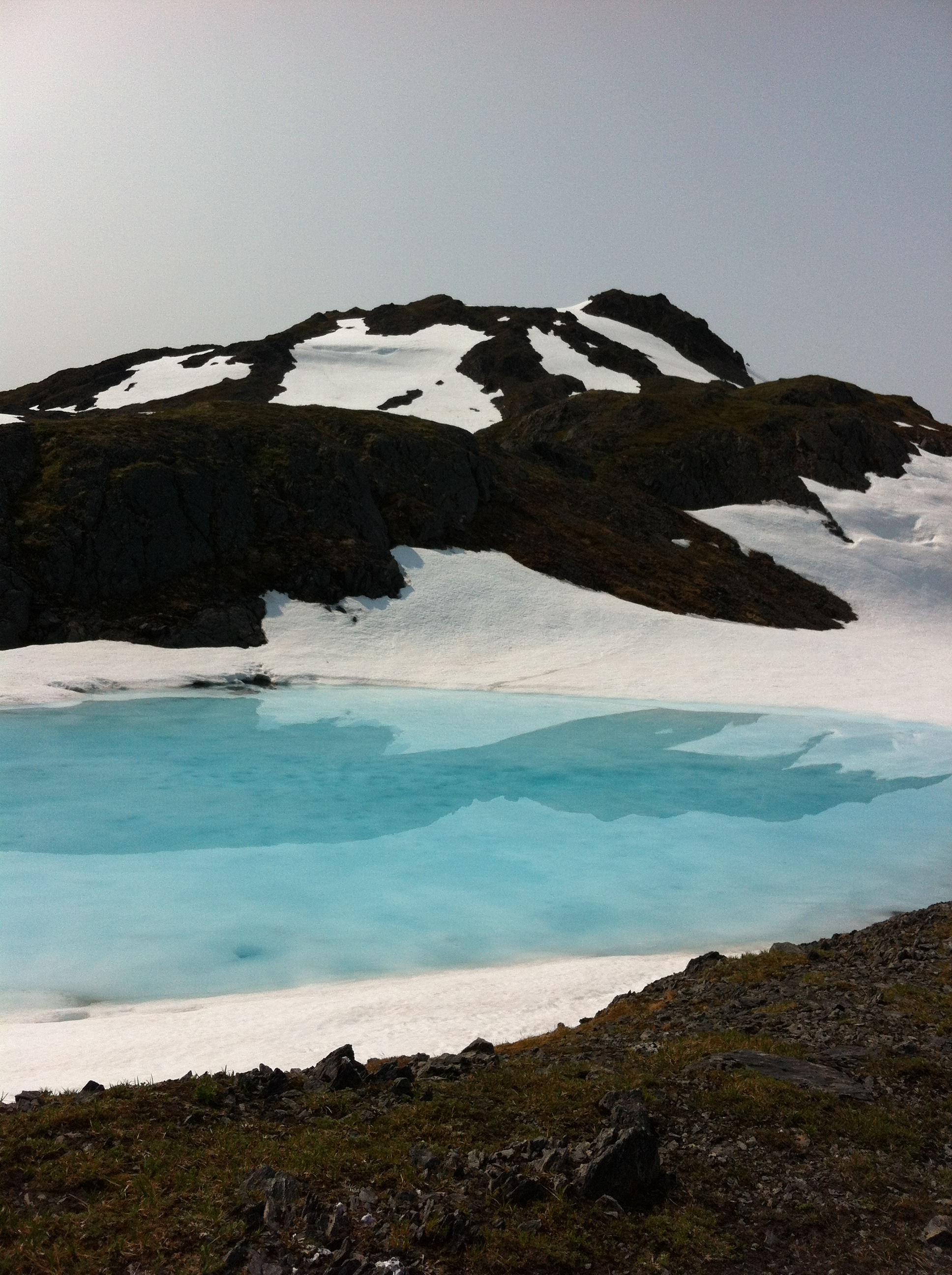
Snows cling to the mountaintops in summer

The weather of Kodiak is temperate. December to March is the cold season while June to August is the summer season. It is Dfc bordering on Cfb, Dfb and Cfc in the Koppen classification.

Climate data for Kodiak Airport, Alaska (1991–2020 normals, (Note: Mean monthly maxima and minima (i.e. the highest and lowest temperature readings during an entire month or year) calculated based on data at said location from 1991 to 2020.) extremes 1913–present (Note: Records for Kodiak have been kept at the Kodiak Airport since January 1931 and at an undisclosed location from September 1913 to December 1930. For more information, see ThreadEx))
Month	Jan	Feb	Mar	Apr	May	Jun	Jul	Aug	Sep	Oct	Nov	Dec	Year
Record high °F (°C)	54 (12)	60 (16)	57 (14)	70 (21)	80 (27)	86 (30)	83 (28)	86 (30)	80 (27)	74 (23)	60 (16)	65 (18)	86 (30)
Mean maximum °F (°C)	43.5 (6.4)	43.9 (6.6)	46.3 (7.9)	53.8 (12.1)	64.9 (18.3)	71.1 (21.7)	74.0 (23.3)	73.5 (23.1)	65.4 (18.6)	56.0 (13.3)	48.4 (9.1)	44.5 (6.9)	76.9 (24.9)
Mean daily maximum °F (°C)	36.1 (2.3)	37.5 (3.1)	38.8 (3.8)	44.7 (7.1)	51.7 (10.9)	57.0 (13.9)	61.8 (16.6)	62.8 (17.1)	57.1 (13.9)	48.3 (9.1)	41.2 (5.1)	37.3 (2.9)	47.9 (8.8)
Daily mean °F (°C)	31.2 (−0.4)	32.4 (0.2)	33.2 (0.7)	39.1 (3.9)	45.8 (7.7)	51.4 (10.8)	56.2 (13.4)	56.5 (13.6)	50.6 (10.3)	42.2 (5.7)	35.7 (2.1)	31.9 (−0.1)	42.2 (5.7)
Mean daily minimum °F (°C)	26.2 (−3.2)	27.2 (−2.7)	27.6 (−2.4)	33.6 (0.9)	39.9 (4.4)	45.7 (7.6)	50.5 (10.3)	50.3 (10.2)	44.2 (6.8)	36.0 (2.2)	30.2 (−1.0)	26.5 (−3.1)	36.5 (2.5)
Mean minimum °F (°C)	8.2 (−13.2)	10.4 (−12.0)	13.1 (−10.5)	22.3 (−5.4)	31.0 (−0.6)	37.1 (2.8)	43.1 (6.2)	41.1 (5.1)	32.1 (0.1)	23.9 (−4.5)	16.7 (−8.5)	9.1 (−12.7)	3.0 (−16.1)
Record low °F (°C)	−16 (−27)	−12 (−24)	−6 (−21)	7 (−14)	18 (−8)	30 (−1)	35 (2)	34 (1)	26 (−3)	7 (−14)	0 (−18)	−9 (−23)	−16 (−27)
Average precipitation inches (mm)	8.35 (212)	6.31 (160)	4.82 (122)	6.14 (156)	5.85 (149)	5.17 (131)	4.51 (115)	4.90 (124)	7.55 (192)	8.85 (225)	7.06 (179)	8.81 (224)	78.32 (1,989)
Average snowfall inches (cm)	14.5 (37)	14.4 (37)	12.3 (31)	6.2 (16)	0.5 (1.3)	0.0 (0.0)	0.0 (0.0)	0.0 (0.0)	0.0 (0.0)	0.7 (1.8)	6.1 (15)	15.6 (40)	70.3 (179)
Average extreme snow depth inches (cm)	6.3 (16)	7.0 (18)	4.9 (12)	1.9 (4.8)	0.0 (0.0)	0.0 (0.0)	0.0 (0.0)	0.0 (0.0)	0.0 (0.0)	0.3 (0.76)	2.1 (5.3)	5.4 (14)	11.7 (30)
Average precipitation days (≥ 0.01 in)	18.8	17.3	15.9	18.0	16.5	16.1	14.6	14.8	17.0	18.4	17.0	19.7	204.1
Average snowy days (≥ 0.1 in)	8.9	7.6	9.2	4.0	0.5	0.0	0.0	0.0	0.0	1.1	5.1	9.1	45.5
Average relative humidity (%)	78.0	76.6	73.4	72.4	76.2	80.4	82.4	81.7	80.6	74.9	75.0	75.7	77.1
Average dew point °F (°C)	24.6 (−4.1)	23.7 (−4.6)	24.8 (−4.0)	28.2 (−2.1)	35.8 (2.1)	43.2 (6.2)	48.4 (9.1)	48.6 (9.2)	43.7 (6.5)	32.4 (0.2)	27.0 (−2.8)	24.3 (−4.3)	33.7 (0.9)
Source: NOAA (relative humidity and dew point 1961–1990)

== Education ==
The University of Alaska Anchorage has a 50-acre (20-hectare) campus which opened in 1968, located about 2 miles (3.2 kilometers) northwest of the City of Kodiak.

== Parks and protected areas ==
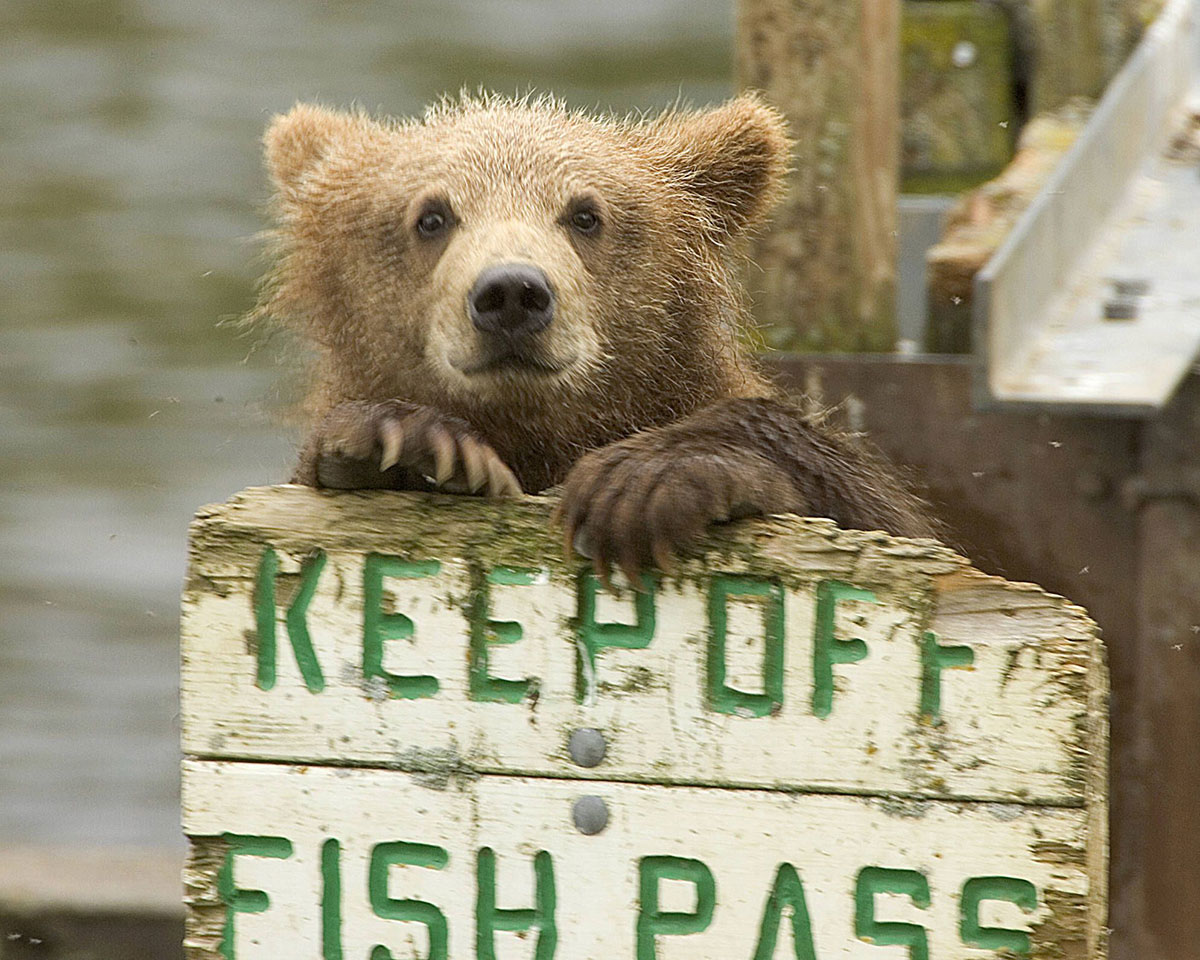
Kodiak bear cub, perched on a sign

Nearly two-thirds of the island is located within the Kodiak National Wildlife Refuge and has no road access. Refuge headquarters are located on the Chiniak Highway, right at the access road for the Buskin River State Recreation Site, which has camping, picnic areas, beaches, and fishing for salmon and trout in the Buskin River.

The Pasagshak River State Recreation Site is a 25 acres (10 ha) park with a small campground and access to some of the island's best salmon and trout fishing. The island is also home to the Fort Abercrombie State Historical Park.
