= 1803 in Russia =

Events from the year 1803 in Russia

== Incumbents ==
- Monarch – Alexander I

== Events ==
- Demidov Lyceum founded in Jaroslavl.
- Mingrelia becomes a Russian subject.
- August 7 - Expedition to accomplish first Russian circumnavigation of the earth begins.
- November 22 - Siege of Ganja begins

== Births ==
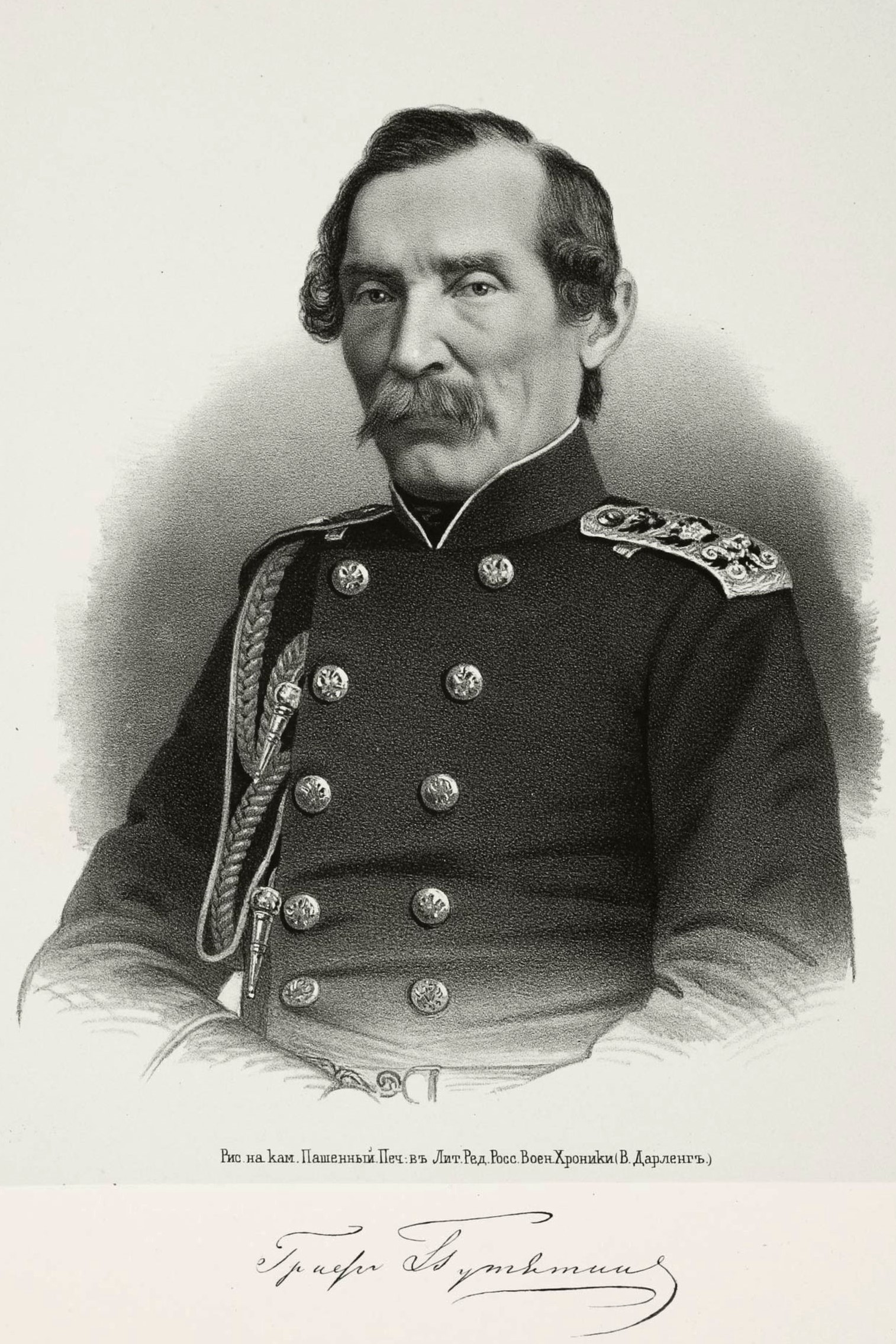
Admiral Yevfimiy Putyatin

- Benzion Judah Berkowitz (d. 1879), Hebrew scholar
- Miron Cherepanov (d. 1849), engineer and inventor
- Alexander Grigorievich Fischer von Waldheim (d. 1884), botanist
- Aleksander Gurilyov (d. 1858), pianist, violinist, and composer
- Gregor von Helmersen (d. 1885), Baltic German geologist
- Evgeniya Maykova (d. 1880), writer and poet
- Vladimir Odoyevsky (d. 1869), philosopher, writer, and music critic
- Nikolai Pavlov (d. 1864), writer, publisher, and editor
- Aleksander Pisarev (d. 1828), playwright and theatre critic
- Serge Poltoratzky (d. 1884), literary scholar and bibliophile
- Yevfimiy Putyatin (d. 1883), admiral
- Vassili Samarsky-Bykhovets (d. 1870), mining engineer
- Yuliya Samoylova (d. 1875), countess
- Gregory Shchurovsky (d. 1884), geologist
- Dmitri Sheremetev (d. 1871), aristocrat
- Dmitry Sontsov (d. 1875), numismatist
- Fyodor Tyutchev (d. 1873), poet and diplomat
- Stepan Vasiliyevich Voyevodsky (d. 1884), admiral, governor of Russian America and Astrakhan
- Nikolay Yazykov (d. 1846), poet

== Deaths ==
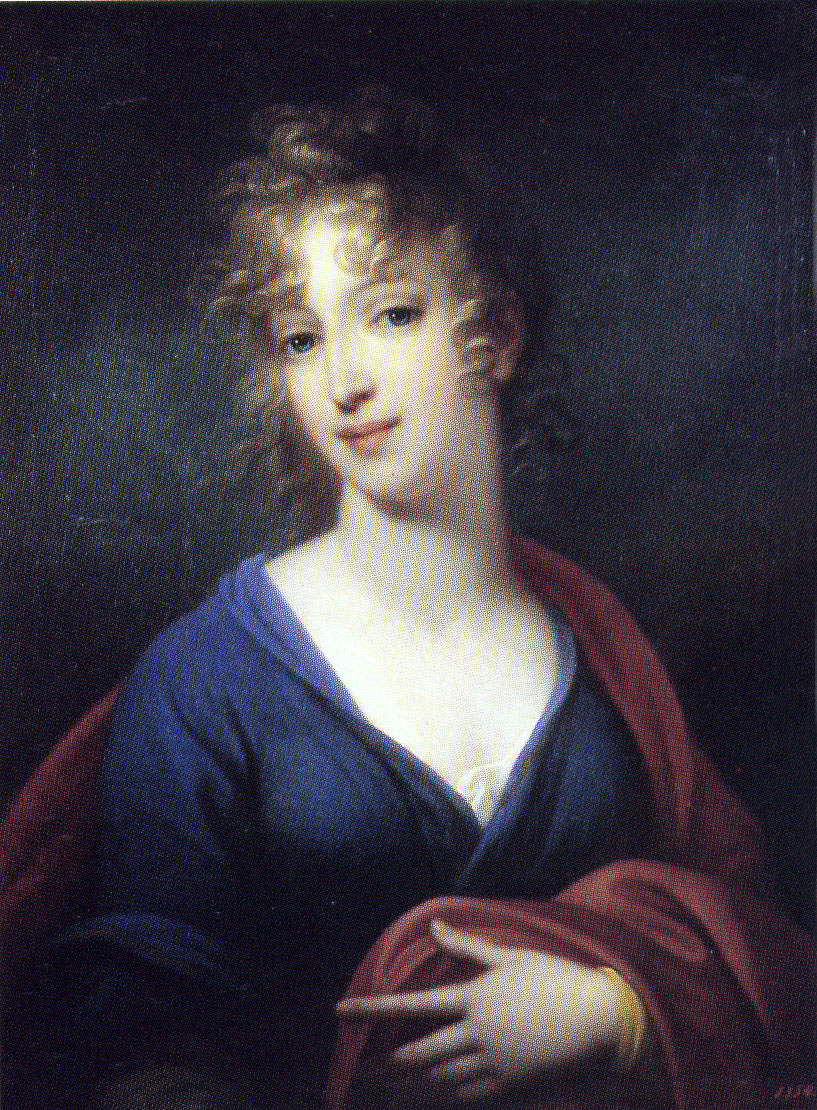
Elena Pavlovna of Russia, 1802

- Ippolit Bogdanovich (b. 1744), poet
- Alexander Dmitriev-Mamonov (b. 1758), lover of Catherine II of Russia
- Grand Duchess Elena Pavlovna (b. 1784), daughter of Paul I of Russia
- Pavel Fonvizin (b. 1746), educator, scholar, and writer
- Dmitri Alekseyevich Golitsyn (b. 1728), diplomat, art agent, author, volcanologist, mineralogist
- Gavriil Kamenev (b. 1772), Romantic poet, writer, and translator
- Praskovia Kovalyova-Zhemchugova (b. 1768), opera singer and actress
- Nikolay Lvov (b. 1753), architect, ethnographer, polymath
- Maria Nesselrode (b. 1786), courtier
- Sophia Razumovskaya (b. 1746), courtier
- Kirill Razumovsky (b. 1728), statesman
- Vasily Rodchev (b. 1768), painter
- Xenia of Saint Petersburg, (born c. 1719-1730), Orthodox saint
