= Nesselrode =

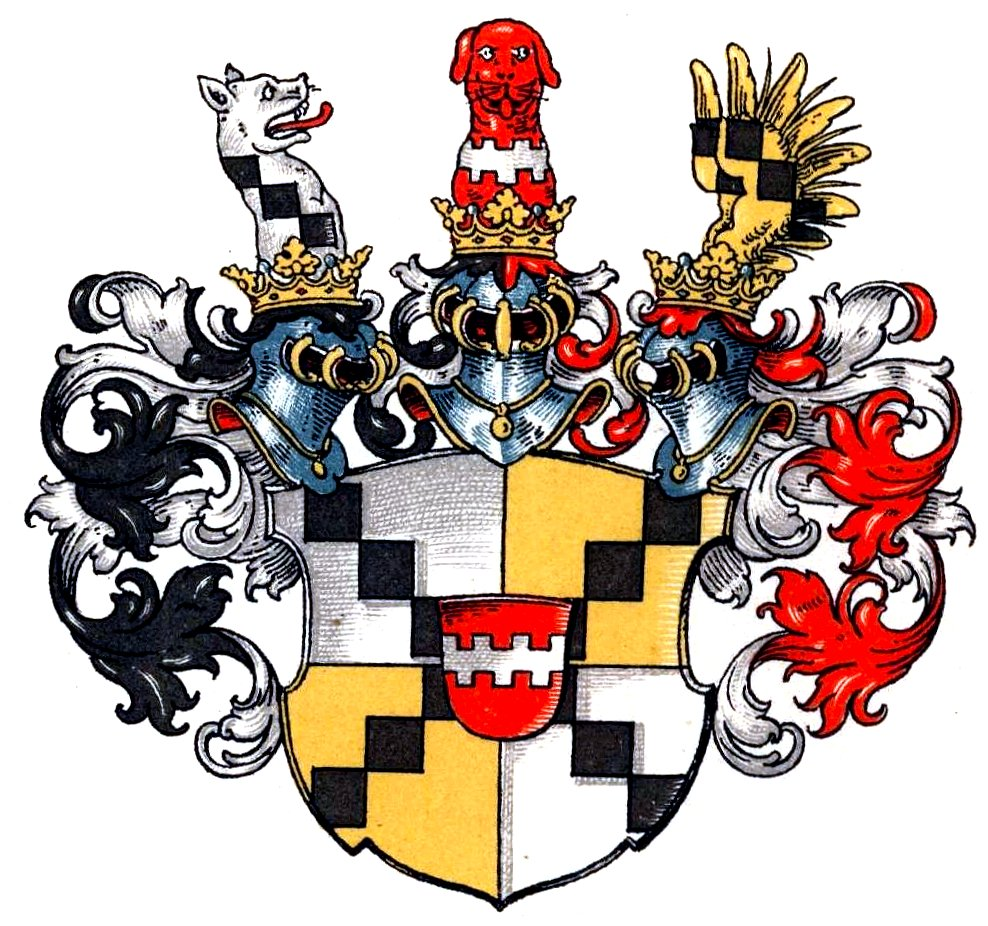
- Coat of Arms of the Counts of Nesselrode-Reichenstein

Origin
- Language: German
- Region of origin: Bergisches Land and Berg

Other names
- Variant forms: Nesselrath, Nesselröden

The House of Nesselrode is an old German noble family originating in the Duchy of Berg. Over the centuries, the family expanded their possessions through marriage with the most powerful families of the region. As a former ruling family they belonged to the small circle of Uradel (ancient nobility).

== History ==
The family was first recorded in September 1303 when its progenitor knight Heinrich genannt Flecke von Nesselrode was mentioned as feudal lord of Deutz Abbey. Burg Nesselrath served as their first family seat. There were several branches of the family: Nesselrode-Reichenstein, Nesselrode-Ehreshoven, Nesselrode-Landscron, and Nesselrode-Hugenpoēt. They were sovereign Counts of the imperially immediate Lordship of Reichenstein.

== Nesselrode-Reichenstein line ==
The Reichenstein line were made Imperial barons in 1653 and Imperial Counts in 1702. In 1698, Baron Franz von Nesselrode-Reichenstein (1635–1707), from 1702 Imperial Count, who served as Imperial Chancellor in the Principality of Münster, bought the immediate Lordship of Reichenstein from the Counts von Wied for 6000 thaler. He was followed by his son, Count Franz Wilhelm Anton von Nesselrode-Reichenstein (1701–1776). With his death, this line of the family became extinct. The County of Reichenstein was inherited by his cousin, Count Johann Wilhelm Maximilian von Nesselrode-Landscron (1726–1800), who became the reigning Count von Nesselrode-Reichenstein.

== Nesselrode-Landscron line ==
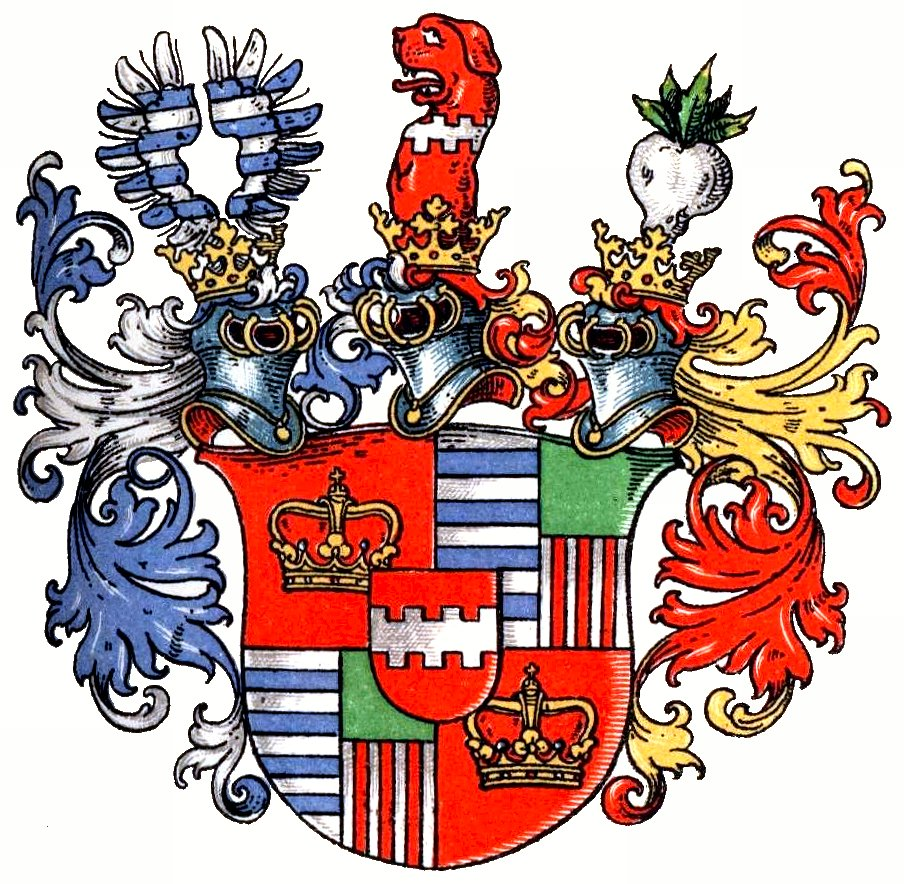
Coat of arms of the Counts of Nesselrode-Landskron

The Nesselrode-Landscron line were made Imperial barons in 1652 and Imperial counts in 1710. Baron Johann Salentin Wilhelm von Nesselrode und Rhade (died in 1715), who served as Imperial Oberstleutnant, was made Imperial Count von Nesselrode-Landscron by Joseph I, Holy Roman Emperor, in 1710. His son, Count Johann Franz von Nesselrode-Landscron (1671–1751), served as Imperial Generalfeldzeugmeister. His son, Count Johann Wilhelm Maximilian von Nesselrode-Landscron und Grimberg (1726–1800), married to Countess Maria Theresia von Auersperg (1729–1803), inherited the Lordship of Reichenstein and became the reigning Count. He was followed by his son, Johann Franz Joseph von Nesselrode-Reichenstein (1755–1824). Due to the dissolution of the Holy Roman Empire, their immediate possessions were mediatized to Nassau, in 1806. This mediatized branch of the family became extinct in 1824. Their possessions were inherited by the Counts Droste zu Vischering, who incorporated the Nesselrode coat of arms into their own, as the heir of the last reigning Count, Johann Franz Joseph, was his eldest surviving daughter, Countess Maria Karoline Theresia Josepha von Nesselrode-Reichenstein, who became Countess Droste zu Vischering (1779–1858).

== Nesselrode-Ehreshoven line ==
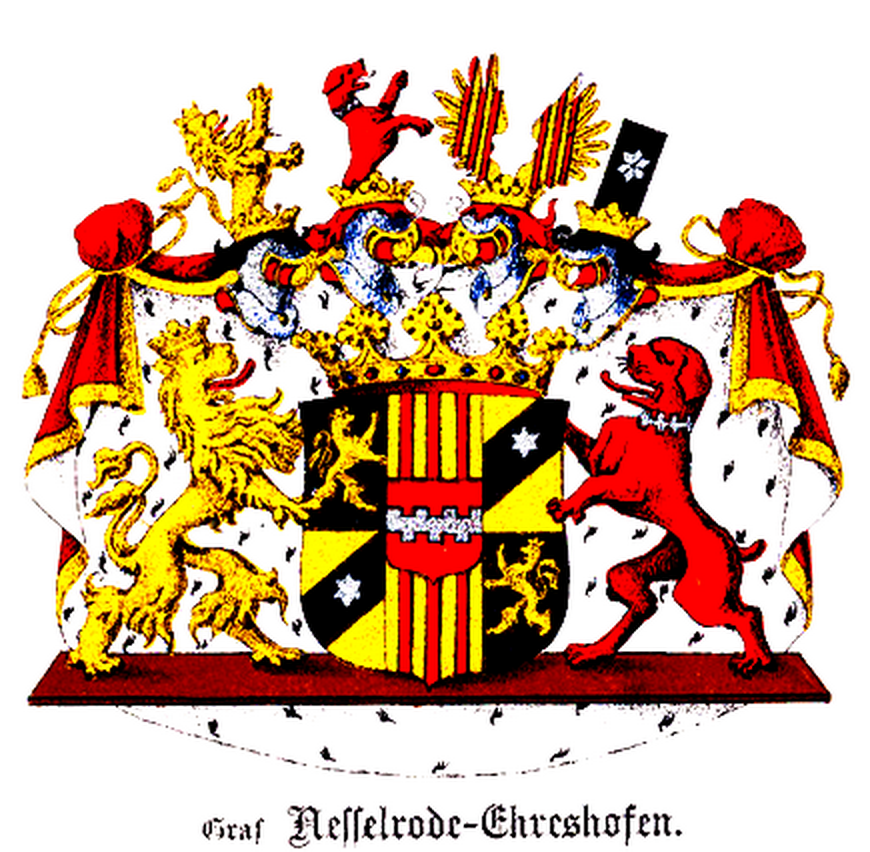
Coat of arms of Counts of Nesselrode-Ehreshoven

The Nesselrode-Ehreshoven line were made Imperial barons in 1653 and Imperial Counts in 1710. Some members of the Nesselrode-Ehreshoven branch settled in Russian Empire, in the 18th century, where they held prominent positions and became incorporated into the Russian nobility. Count Wilhelm Karl von Nesselrode-Ehreshoven (1724–1810) served as the Ambassador of Catherine the Great to Portugal. His son, Count Karl Robert von Nesselrode-Ehreshoven (1780–1862), served as Russian Minister of Foreign Affairs from 1814 to 1856, while his son, Count Dimitri von Nesselrode-Ehreshoven (1816–1906), served in the Russian State Duma and held the position of Oberhofmeister at Imperial Court of Russia.

== Nesselrode-Hugenpoēt line ==
Carl-Theodor, Baron von Nesselrode-Hugenpoēt, served as a major in the Bavarian army. His brother, Baron Maximilian Friedrich von Nesselrode-Hugenpoēt (1773-1851), who later became a Generalmajor, was confirmed as a baron on 22 August 1814, in the Kingdom of Bavaria. The title of Baron in Bavaria was also confirmed in 1822 to Baron Carl Anselm Franz von Nesselrode-Hugenpoēt, who served as Bavarian Hauptmann.

== Former properties of the Counts of Nesselrode ==
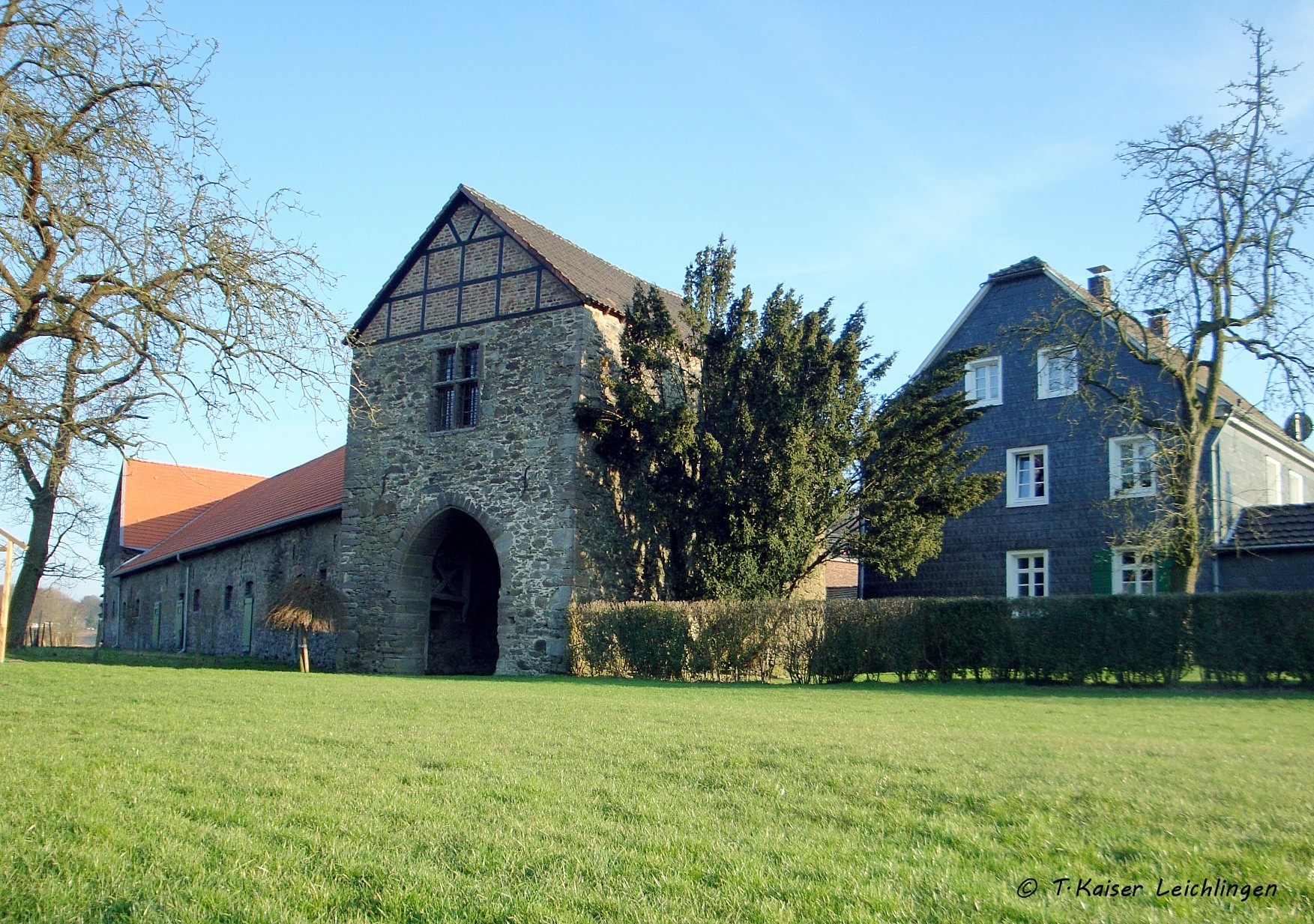
Burg Nesselrath

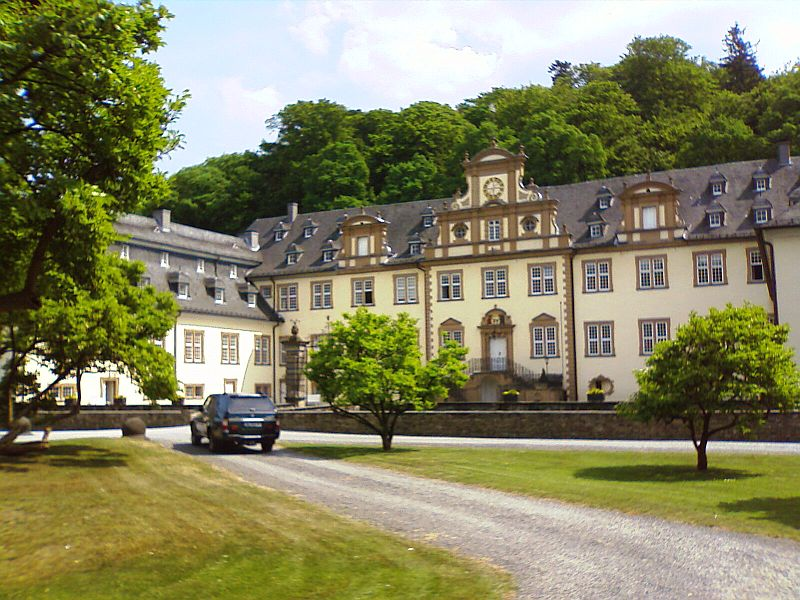
Ehreshoven Castle

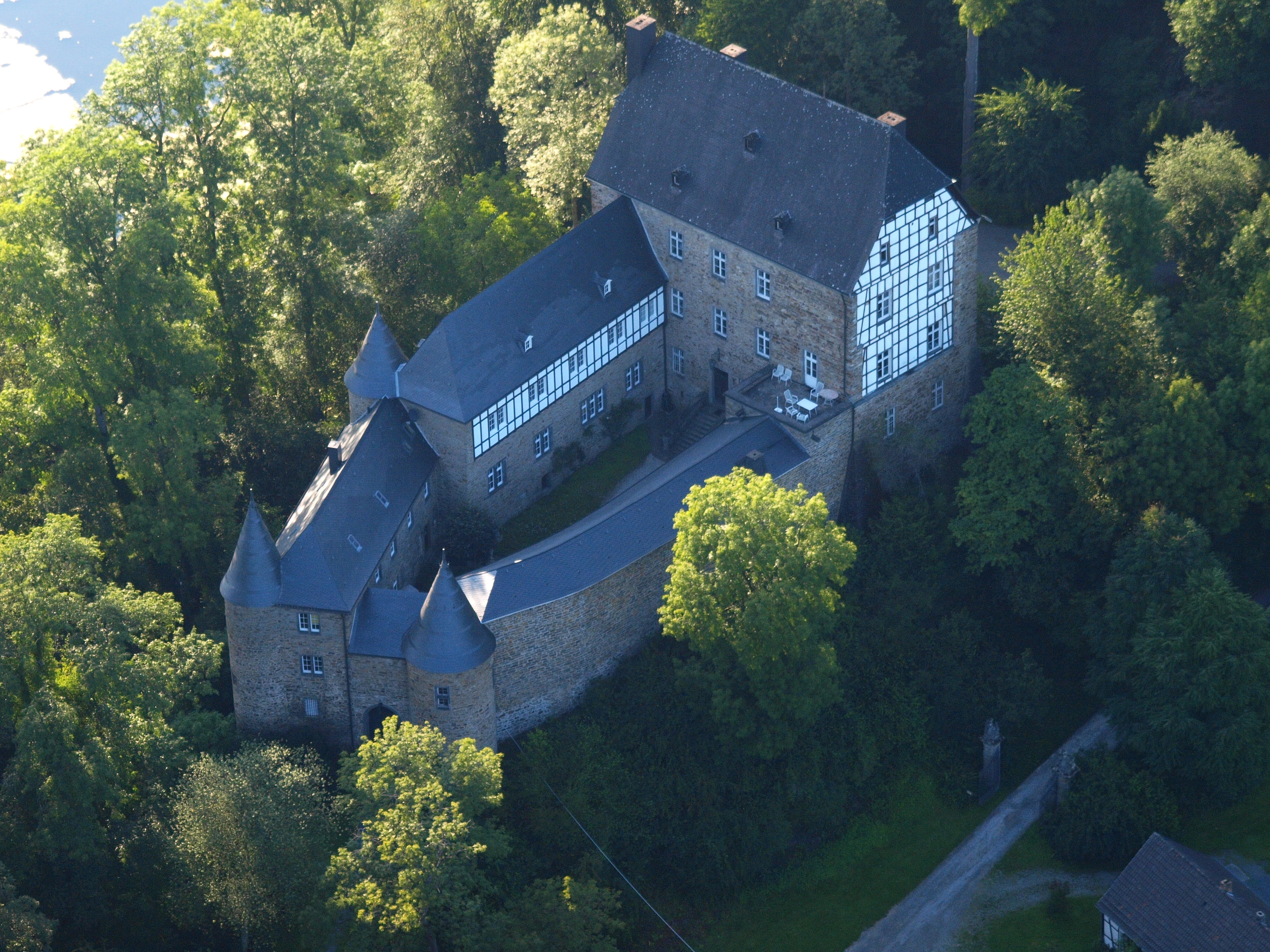
Castle Herrnstein

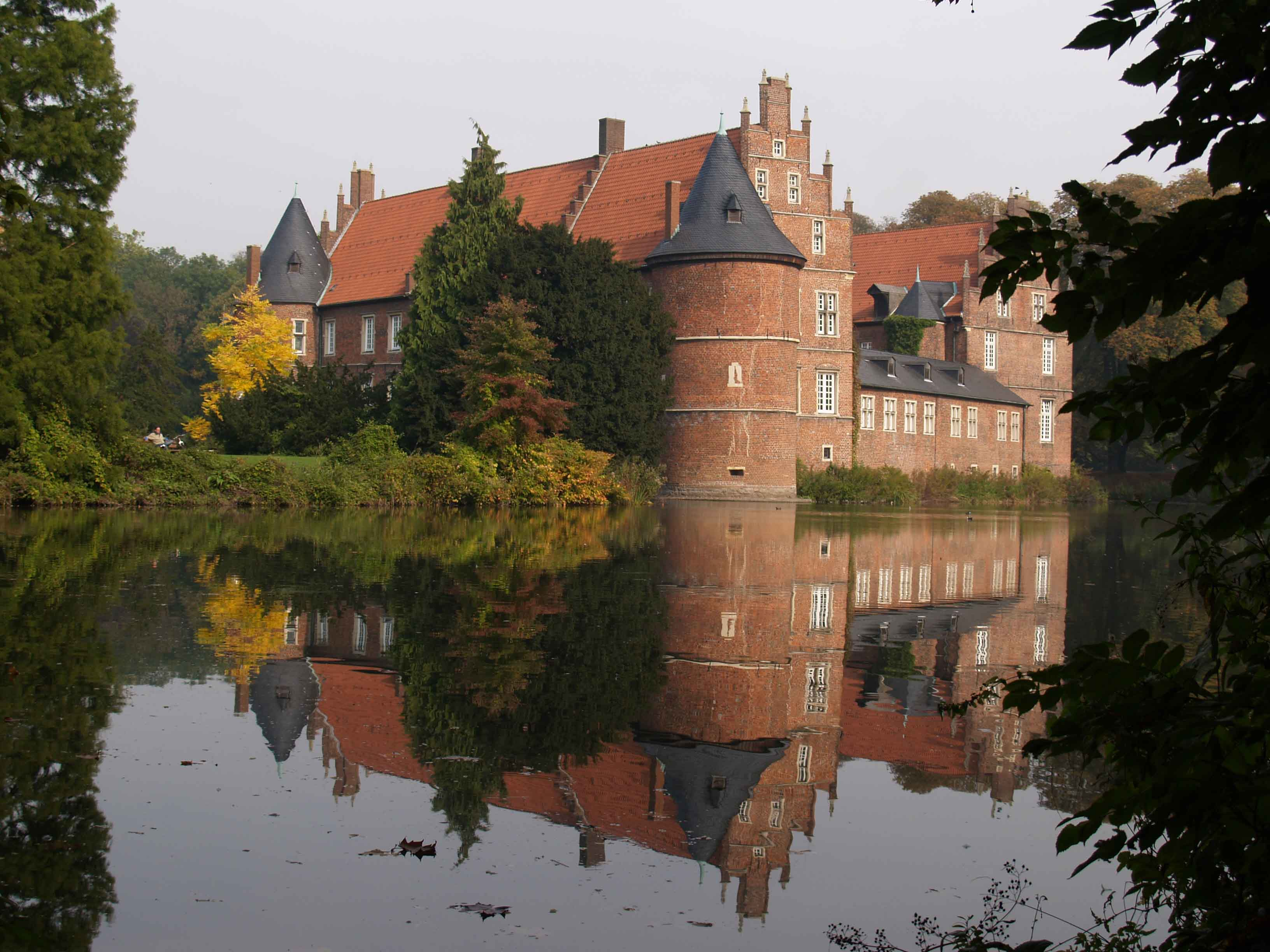
Castle Herten

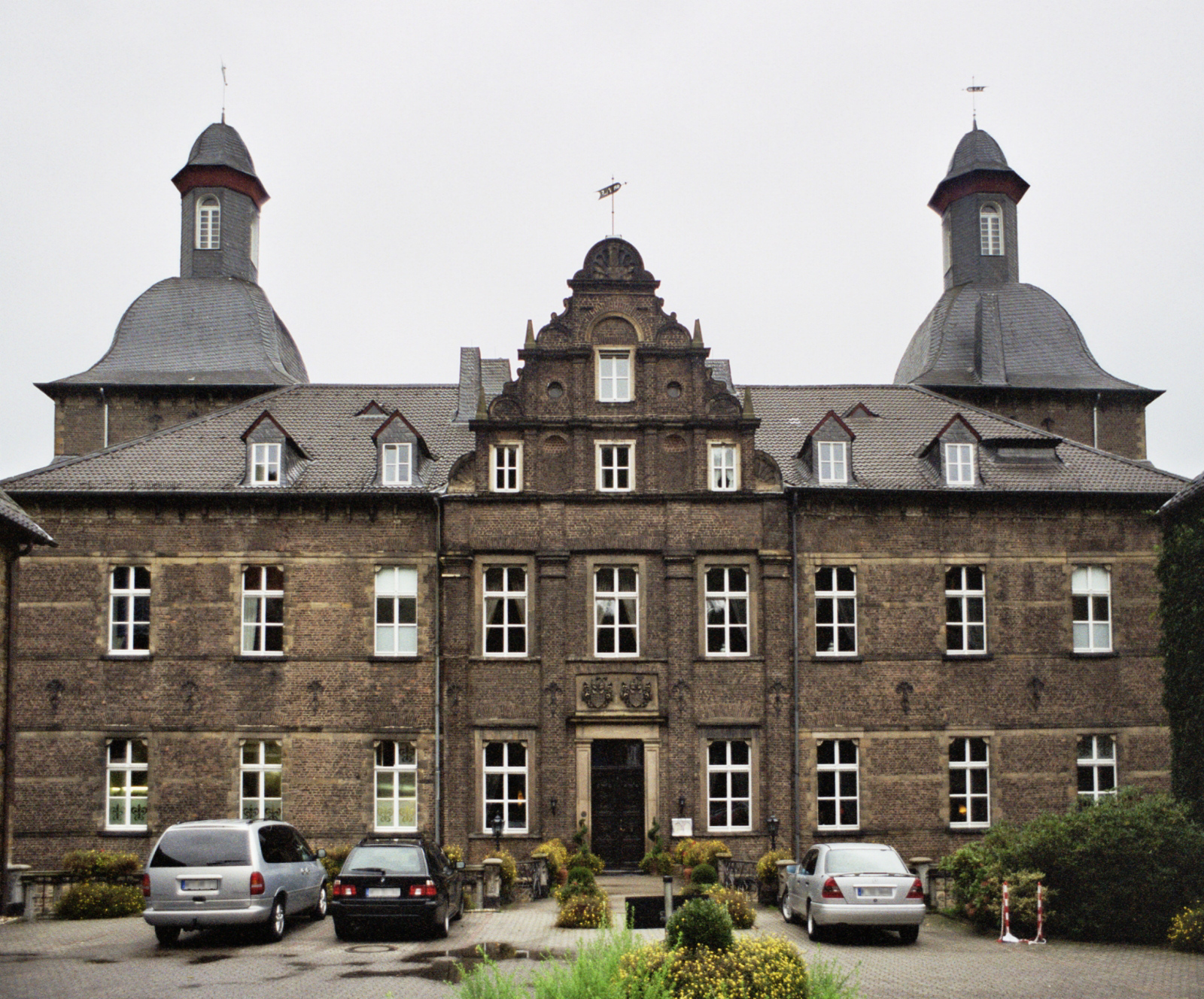
Castle Hugenpoēt

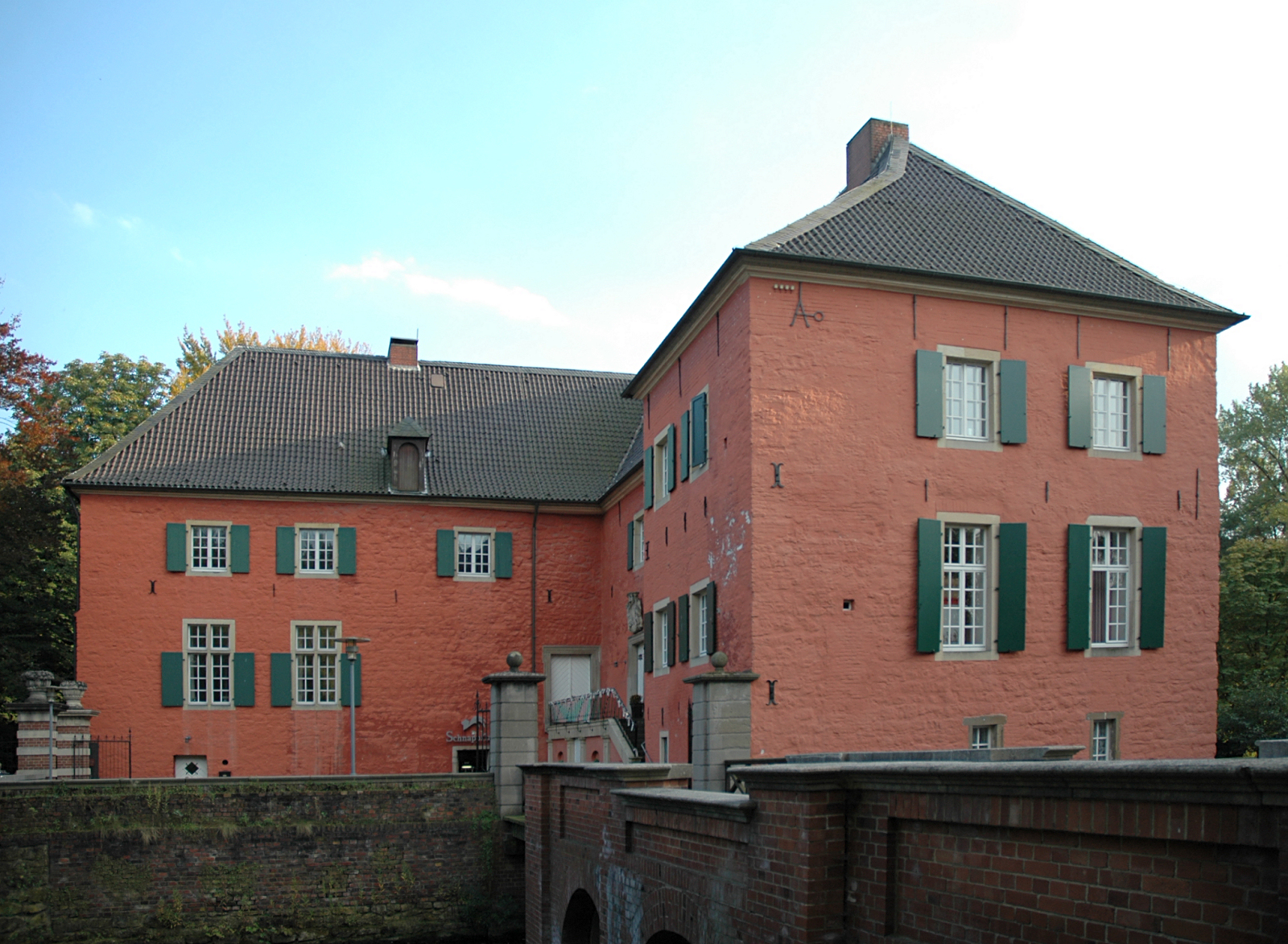
Wasserburg Lüttinghof

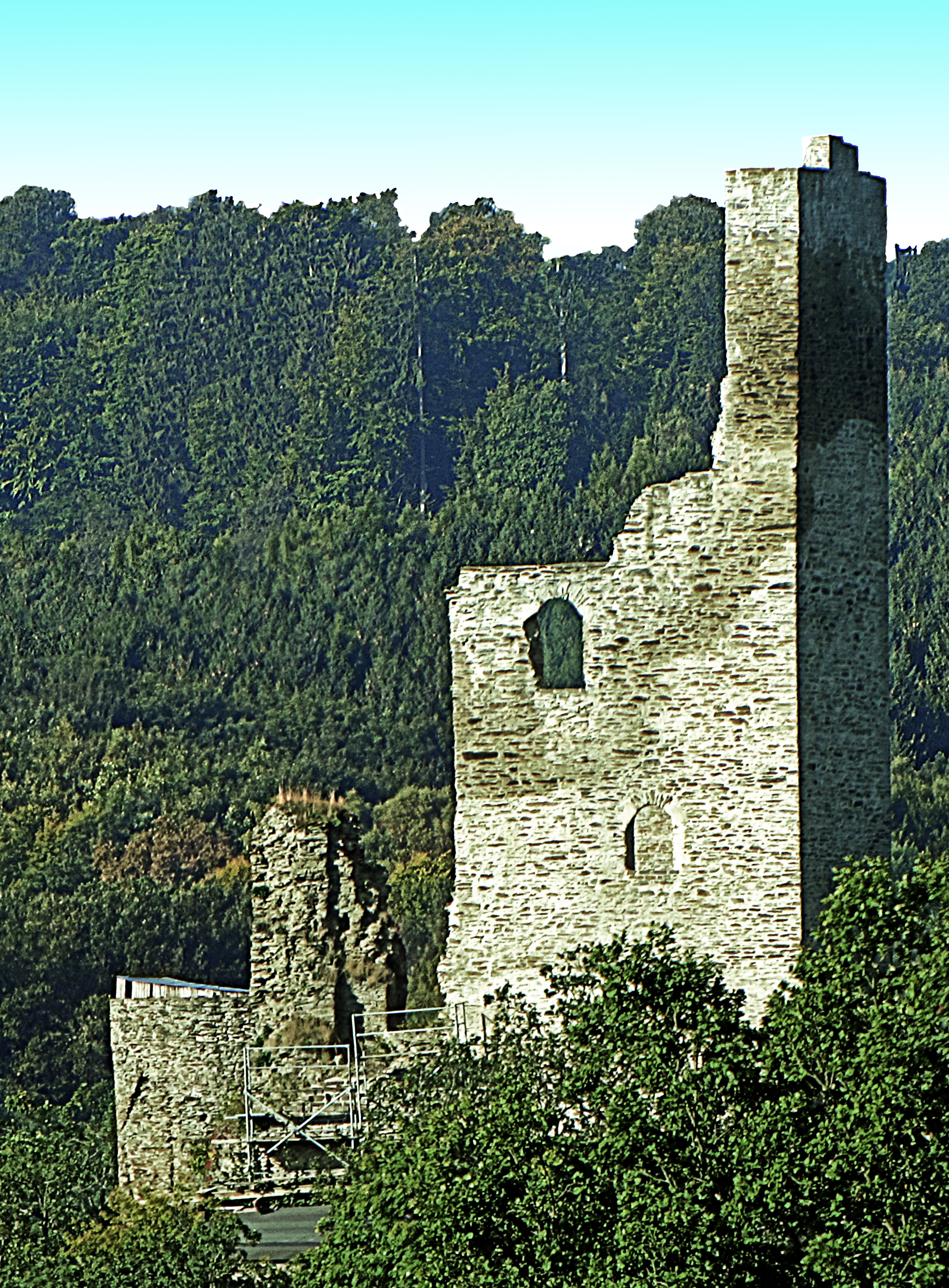
Burg Reichenstein

== Notable members ==
Notable persons with that name include:

- Karl von Nesselrode-Ehreshoven (1780–1862), Russian foreign minister
- Maria von Nesselrode (1822–1874), Polish pianist
- Maria von Nesselrode (1786–1849), Russian court lady

== See also ==
- Mount Nesselrode
