= Dmitry Guryev =

Russian nobleman and statesman (1758–1825)

- Дмитрий Гурьев
- Portrait by Janos Rombauer, 1818, oils; Tretyakov Gallery

Minister of Finance
- In office January 1, 1810 – April 22, 1823
- Preceded by: Fyodor Golubtsov
- Succeeded by: Egor Kankrin

Personal details
- Born: January 18, 1758 Saint Petersburg, Russia
- Died: October 12, 1825 (aged 67) Saint Petersburg, Russia
- Resting place: Farforovskoe Cemetery
- Spouse: Praskovya Saltykova
- Children: five, including Alexander Maria and Nikolay
- Awards: Order of the Holy Apostle Andrew the First–Called

Count (from 1819) Dmitry Alexandrovich Guryev (Russian: Дмитрий Александрович Гурьев; January 18, 1758 – October 12, 1825, Saint Petersburg) was a Russian Imperial statesman, best known for his service during Tsar Alexander I’s reign. He was a Court Master of the Court (from January 1, 1797), Senator (from October 20, 1799), Manager of the Imperial Cabinet (August 26, 1801 – September 30, 1825), Minister of Appanages (July 9, 1806 – September 30, 1825), member of the State Council (January 1, 1810 – April 22, 1823), third Minister of Finance of Russia (January 1, 1810 – September 30, 1823). Father of Alexander Guryev and Nikolai Guryev, father-in-law of Count Karl von Nesselrode-Ehreshoven. Actual Privy Councillor.

== Origin and rise ==
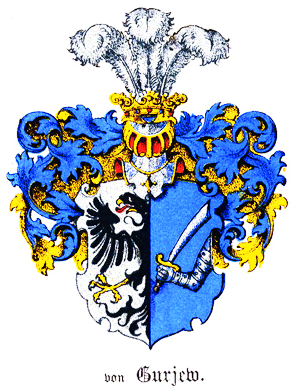
Coat of arms of the Guryev family

Born into an impoverished Russian nobility, the Guryev family, he was the son of foreman Alexander Guryev (died in 1788) and his wife, Anna Eropkina. He was baptized on January 13, 1758, in the Simenov Church, godson of Count Sergei Yaguzhinsky. He was educated at home and began serving on November 17, 1772, as a soldier in the Izmailovsky Life Guards Regiment, a week later he was promoted to corporal. In 1773, he received the rank of sergeant, in 1779, he was made an ensign, in 1782, a second lieutenant, a year later (1783) a lieutenant and on November 1, 1785, a lieutenant captain.

The quick start of Guryev's career was greatly facilitated by his personal connections, in particular – the patronage of Count Pavel Skavronsky, grateful to Guryev for deftly arranging a profitable marriage for him with Yekaterina von Engelhardt, the niece of Potemkin:

Guryev was never good or smart; only at that time was he young, fresh, hefty, white and blush, at the same time extremely searching and agreeable; he wanted to get into people at all costs, and blind happiness heard his prayers. He accidentally met a young, effeminate millionaire, Count Pavel Martynovich Skavronsky, the grandson of Catherine I's brother, who was going abroad. Guryev knew how to please him, even to master him, and for more than three years traveled with him in Europe.

— Vigel's "Notes"

Following this, his marriage in 1785 to Countess Praskovyya Nikolaevna Saltykova (1764–1830) introduced him into the circle of the Petersburg aristocracy and brought him closer to the Imperial House.

He received <...> moreover from Skavronsky three thousand souls as a sign of memory and true friendship. Youth, foreign education, court rank, wealth, all this allowed him to think about a profitable party, only the news of his name still prevented him from obtaining the right to citizenship in the aristocratic world; he soon acquired them, marrying Countess Praskovya Nikolaevna Saltykova, a thirty–year–old girl, ugly and evil, whom no one wanted to marry, despite her three thousand souls.

— Vigel's "Notes"

As a result, in 1786, Dmitry Guryev received the rank of Chamber Junker, in 1794 – Master of Ceremonies, and in 1795 – the rank of Actual Chamberlain. In January 1797, appointed as the Hofmeister of the Court of the Grand Duke Alexander Pavlovich, Guryev joined the circle of his friends, which was formed at that time and consisted of young aristocrats: Count Pavel Stroganov, Count Viktor Kochubey, Nikolay Novosiltsev and Prince Adam Chartoryisky.

== Government activities ==
After the accession of Alexander I and primarily thanks to the assistance of his "young friends" on August 26, 1801, Guryev was appointed manager of the Cabinet of His Imperial Majesty, and on September 8, 1802, he became a comrade (or, in other words, deputy) Minister of Finance, of already old and permanent ailing Count Alexei Vasiliev. This state of affairs led to the fact that Dmitry Guryev practically independently conducted the affairs of the financial department – under Vasiliev.

In February 1804, Dmitry Guryev was granted the position of Actual Privy Councillor, and on July 9, 1806, he was appointed to the post of Minister of Appanages, which he held until the very end of his life. This position in particular gave him strength of position, independence and influence on the entire court department. But, it is possible that already being the Minister of Appanages, Dmitry Guryev, after the death of Count Alexei Vasiliev, was not immediately appointed to his place. In 1807–1808, the duties of the minister were performed by the manager of the ministry, Fyodor Golubtsov, who eventually (in 1809) received the post of minister. Dmitry Guryev, as he was an assistant minister under Vasiliev, remained in the same place – under Golubtsov.

During this rather turbulent period, when the former "young friends" of the Grand Duke one after another left from the political life of Russia, Mikhail Speransky, the future State Secretary, occupied an increasingly strong position at the throne. In view of the difficult economic situation in the country, in November 1809, Emperor Alexander I instructed Speransky to prepare an urgent program for overcoming the financial crisis. Temporary and fragmented measures could no longer solve the accumulated problems of the state budget. To prepare the project, a special committee was formed, in the discussion of which Guryev also took an active part, in recent years having become very close to Mikhail Speransky. A pragmatist and subtle courtier, Dmitry Guryev used all his intellect and Speransky's growing influence on the emperor in the struggle for the coveted chair of finance minister and by 1810, he finally managed to "overthrow" his predecessor, Fyodor Golubtsov. Outwardly demonstrating his full support for the new ministerial system of Mikhail Speransky, aimed primarily at strengthening the vertical of power, on January 1, 1810, Dmitry Guryev, under his patronage, was appointed Minister of Finance and at the same time a member of the new reformed State Council.

== Minister of Finance ==
Count Guryev, lithographed by Gustav Adolf Hippius, 1822

According to the reviews of people who knew him closely, Dmitry Guryev "... had a clumsy mind, and it was difficult for him to maintain a balance of judgments". However, despite such a reputation, Alexander I entrusted him with the most important task at that time to stabilize the country's financial situation, which had been pretty shaken by the entire previous trade, industrial and customs policy. The program for overcoming the financial crisis was based on the famous "Finance Plan" for 1810, developed by Speransky and Balugiansky and considered in December 1809 at meetings of a special "Finance Committee" (or, as it was called, "Guryev's Circle"). In addition to the three already named, this financial circle also included the state treasurer Baltazar Kampenhausen. It is clear that Minister Golubtsov, who had been sitting out his last days in his place, was not invited to the meetings.

The "Plan of Finance" developed by the circle included urgent monetary and economic measures, the implementation of which was necessary in 1810, as well as more long–term measures. According to the first point of the plan, in 1810, metal circulation was restored and part of the bank notes was withdrawn to increase their value, a number of internal loans were undertaken, which stabilized the state budget. However, the difficult foreign policy situation on the eve of the war, requiring increased combat readiness and an increase in the army, forced the introduction of new taxes one after another and the increase of old ones.

Most of the measures were openly aimed at increasing the revenue side of the state budget. So, already in 1810, the surplus interest rate on merchant capital was increased, taxes were introduced on trading peasants and foreign artisans, and the poll tax was extended to people of other faiths. In 1812, a 0.5% tax on houses in the capitals (property tax) was also introduced, and the salt, copper, stamp, bill and passport taxes were increased. In addition, new, higher drinking duties were imposed and new taxes that were previously absent, for example, on tea and beer, were introduced. At the same time, they tried to promote the development of domestic industry by raising customs duties. Dmitry Guryev continued the consistent implementation of the items of the "Plan of Finance" after the end of the War of 1812. So, the Ministry of Finance only in 1817 withdrew from circulation a part of paper notes (236 million out of 836 million rubles in circulation), for which internal loans were concluded for 113 million rubles and external loans for 83 million.

From the point of view of the general concept of state building, the authors of the "Plan of Finance", pointing out the need for a general reform of the financial system, insisted on the introduction of an open state budget and proposed a new system of central government, under which the Minister of Finance was to exercise legislative power.

However, these measures did not bring the expected results, but only caused growing discontent among the nobility and merchants. This discontent increased especially after the state wine monopoly was introduced in twenty provinces of Russia in 1819–1820. Nevertheless, the establishment in 1817 of the Council of State Credit Institutions and the State Credit Bank created real mechanisms to accelerate the development of the financial system of the Russian Empire.

The full implementation of the "Plan of Finance" was also prevented by the opposition from the chairman and member of the Department of Economy of the State Council, Nikolay Mordvinov and Yegor Kankrin, who saw in the plans of Guryev himself and other developers of the "Plan" a hidden intention to limit the autocratic rights of the monarch. Gradually, they were able to convince of their suspicions and constantly hesitant Alexander I. In 1816, Dmitry Guryev's most resigned note, entitled "On the Organization of the Supreme Governmental Places in Russia", in which he directly proposed strengthening the power of the ministers and giving them legislative functions, also belongs to him. The careless grain fell on the prepared soil and the note provoked the emperor's displeasure.

On January 13, 1817, he was awarded the Order of the Holy Apostle Andrew the First–Called.

And yet, at the behest of Alexander I, Dmitry Guryev, who already had a reputation as a liberal, in 1818–1819, headed (as Minister of Appanages) the work of the Secret Committee to prepare a draft peasant reform. In this position, he prepared a rather radical project, the implementation of which could lead to the creation in Russia of an agrarian system of a farming type. However, this project of Guryev turned out to be untimely. On August 9, 1821, the Russian Emperor Alexander I established the Siberian Committee and Count Guryev was included in its first composition. By the beginning of the 1820s, a turning point was clearly outlined in the political worldview of Alexander I, when, on the basis of the collapse of foreign policy liberalism, he became disillusioned with the program of internal reforms in Russia. This turning point could not but affect Dmitry Guryev, who on April 22, 1823, was forced to resign from the post of Minister of Finance – nevertheless retaining the post of Head of the Appanage Department.

Two years later, on September 30, 1825, Dmitry Guryev died in Saint Petersburg, aged sixty-seven; he was buried in the Transfiguration Church at the Cemetery of the Porcelain Factory. On this occasion, Konstantin Bulgakov wrote to Count Zakrevsky:

Count Guryev ordered to live long! He passed away on September 30th, at three o'clock in the afternoon. Countess Nesselrode had arrived the day before, as if to close his eyes. A great loss for the city. His house was opened to the best society.

In the summer of 1932, the Transfiguration Church, in which Dmitry Guryev was buried, was demolished and the grave destroyed.

== Performance evaluation ==
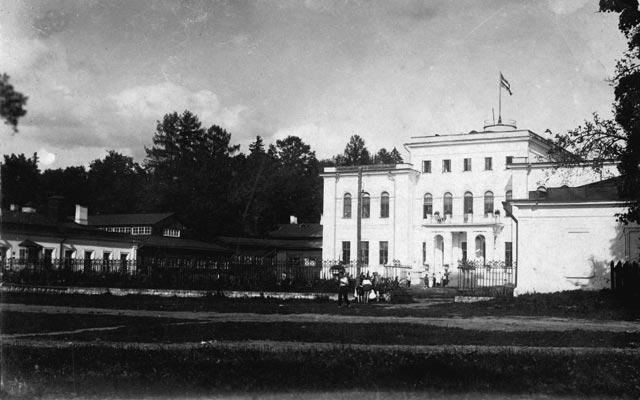
"Podmoskovnaya" of Count Guryev – the village of Bogorodskoye

State activities of Dmitry Guryev as Minister of Finance caused an avalanche of reproaches from contemporaries, and later – sharp criticism of historians. Nevertheless, he can be attributed to a small number of dignitaries of the first quarter of the 19th century who had a clear understanding of the needs of the country and came up with a real and detailed program of transformations.

Guryev entered big politics during the peak of liberal constitutional experiments and the search for power in the first decade of the reign of Alexander I. His leadership of the financial department fell on the hardest time of the Patriotic War of 1812, and then during the elimination of its socio-economic consequences and the second renaissance of state liberalism, which found expression primarily in attempts to resolve the peasant question. The breakdown and decline of Guryev's ministerial career, outwardly associated with his disagreements, and then a break with the all–powerful Alexey Arakcheev, in fact, clearly demonstrated the strengthening of protective tendencies in the government's policy and an increasingly distrustful attitude towards the problem of reforms.

Having started his career as a man of Speransky and his reformist ideas, he survived his political downfall for a long time, however, he could not withstand the final strengthening of the power of Arakcheev, who first supported Guryev against Mordvinov and Kankrin for apparatus reasons, and then deprived him of his support.

== Private life ==
At the height of Guryev's power, at the end of the 1810s, in search of support from the treasury, representatives of all classes sought to get him to receive an appointment. "Aspirants, seekers, tapes, whoever was not here! To be called is already a great mercy", wrote Alexander Bulgakov about his anteroom in 1818. The arrogant nobility, however, could not forgive Guryev of a comparatively low origin, for what he had in the world...

... all the habits of the greatest aristocrat, although his father, almost from a taxable state, was the steward of one rich, but not a noble and provincial landowner; but he himself married Countess Saltykova, an elderly girl, from whose hand, despite her great fortune, everyone ran for a long time.

— Vigel's "Notes"

The proper name of the Minister of Finance and Appanages, Dmitry Guryev, outlived his political career for a long time, became a household name and firmly entered the everyday life of the Russian language. The Guryev Taxes, the Guryev Duties and the Guryev Wine Monopoly were soon forgotten. But until now, the invention of the famous recipe – Guryev Porridge is associated with the name of Guryev:

It was not without reason that Guryev traveled abroad: he improved himself there in the gastronomic part. He had a really ingenious genius of this kind, and it seems there are pates, there are cutlets that bear his name. He gave dinners to his noble new relatives, and only to them; his house began to be revered as one of the best, and he himself was among the first patricians of Petropolis.

— Vigel's "Notes"

== Family ==
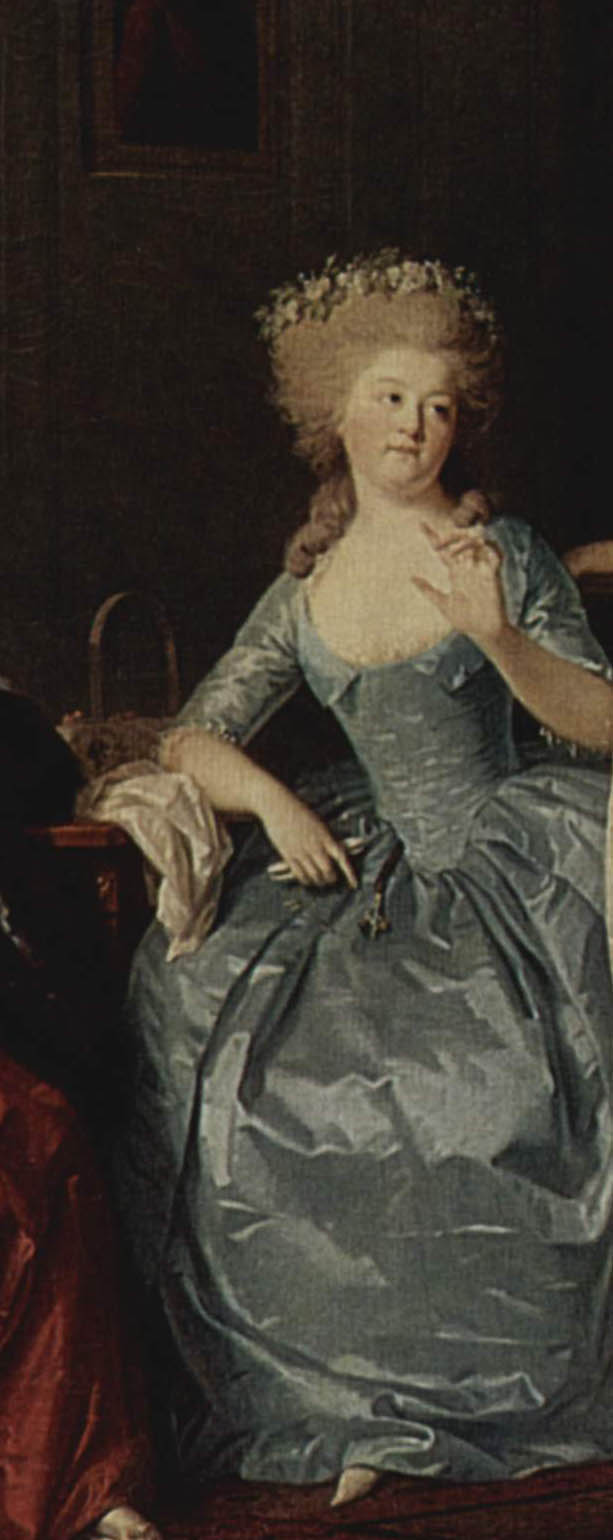
Praskovya Nikolaevna Saltykova

From 1785, he was married to Countess Praskovya Saltykova (1764 – 10 May 1830), daughter of the Life Guards Lieutenant Count Nikolai Saltykov (1743–1800) and his wife, Princess Anna Gagarina (1742 – 21 April 1820). According to Vigel, by the hand of Countess Saltykova, despite her great fortune, everyone ran for a long time. Having married her, Guryev took a decent dowry and was known at one time as a very rich man. Following her husband, Countess Guryeva made her court career. In November 1806, she received the Order of Saint Catherine (Lesser Cross), and on August 22, 1826, she was granted a lady of state.

At one time, the house of Countess Guryeva was in the evenings a favorite gathering place for the Saint Petersburg elite society and the entire diplomatic corps. According to Countess Dorothea de Ficquelmont, she was an amiable and social woman. Her death from fever was a great loss for many people who for twenty years constantly communicated with her and found her a kind person. She left a huge void not only in the hearts of her friends, but also in the whole society. "The Countess was often ill and in the last three months her face has changed beyond recognition. But, in fact, her death in May 1830 was sudden and unexpected. She continued to meet people, went for walks every day, and only two days before her death it became obvious that she was really sick. Almost the entire city was present at the countess's funeral". She was buried next to her husband in the Transfiguration Church at the Cemetery of the Porcelain Factory. In marriage, she had children:

- Alexander Dmitrievich (1785–1865), freemason, lieutenant general and senator; was married to Countess Evdokia Tolstaya (1795–1863), daughter of Count Peter Tolstoy;
- Maria Dmitrievna (1786–1849), maid of honor since 1802, in January 1812, married Count Karl von Nesselrode (1780–1862); since 1816 she has been a lady of the Order of Saint Catherine, since 1836, she has been a lady of state;
- Elena Dmitrievna (April 10, 1788 – March 17, 1834), baptized on April 19, 1788, in the Church of the Vladimir Most Holy Theotokos, in the Court Sloboda, with the acceptance of Darya Petrovna Saltykova; the maid of honor of the court, was a very good singer; married (since May 26, 1818) to the chamberlain Alexei Sverchkov (1791–1828). She adopted the niece of Chancellor Nesselrode Countess Maria von Nesselrode, later Kalergis–Mukhanova, a brilliant pianist, beloved of Eugene Sue, who brought her out in the novel "The Eternal Jew". She died in Saint Petersburg from an apoplectic stroke, was buried at the Farforovskoye Cemetery;
- Nikolai Dmitrievich (1789–1849), diplomat and privy councilor, since 1819, has been married to Marina Naryshkina (1798–1871), daughter of Dmitry Naryshkin;
- Vasily Dmitrievich (April 8, 1796 – November 20, 1797), was buried at the Volkovskoye Cemetery.
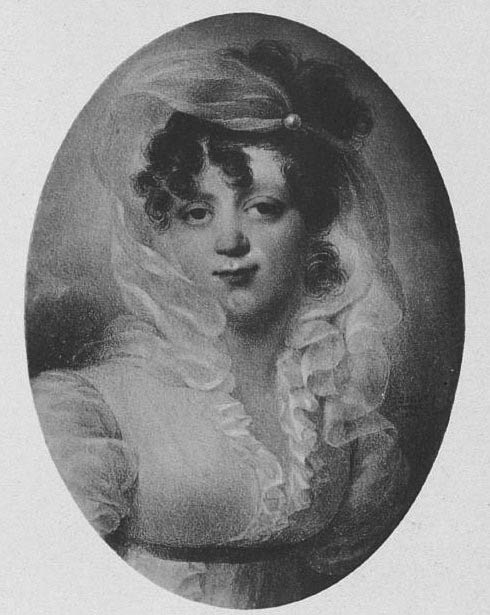
Maria Dmitrievna, daughter

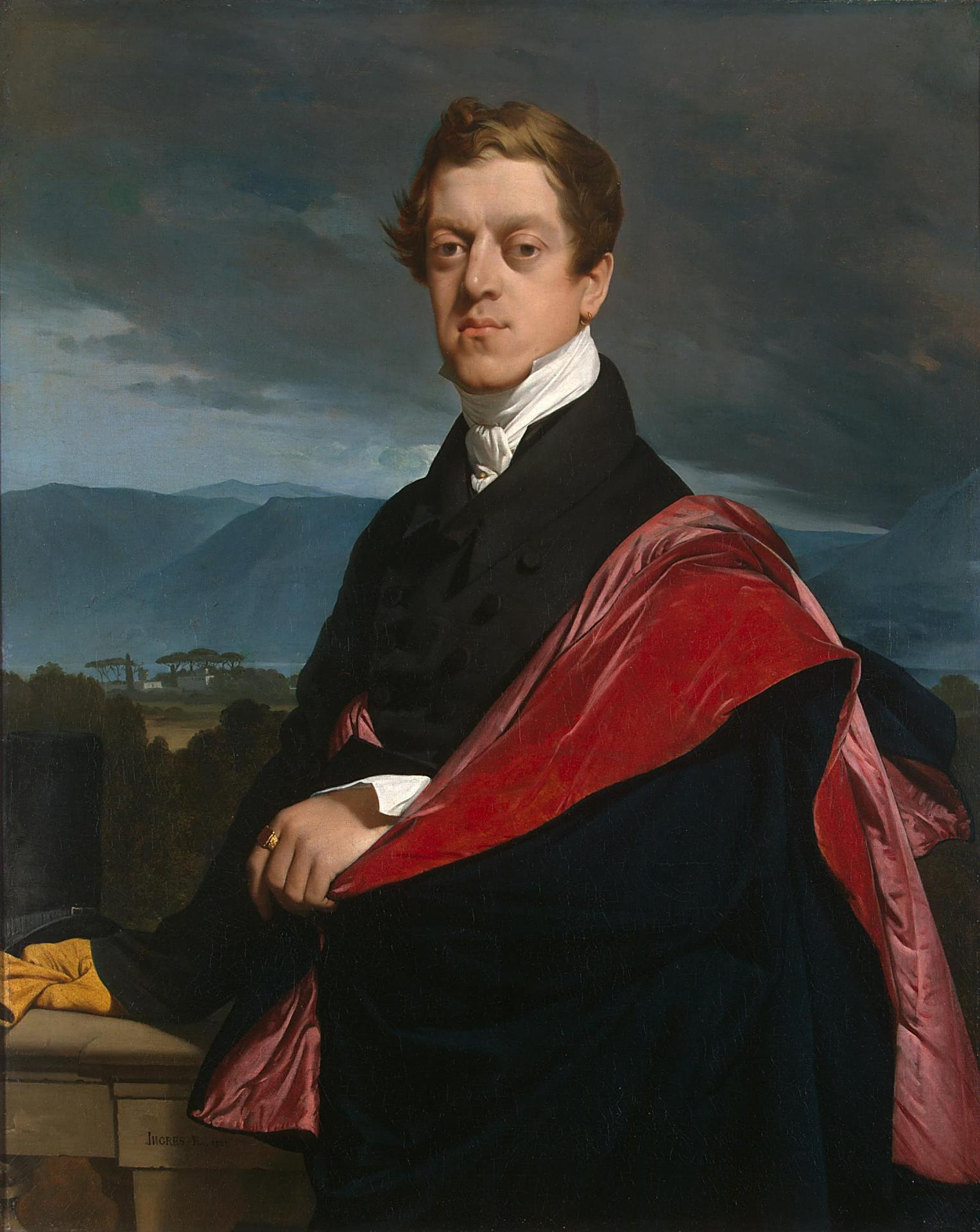
Nikolai Dmitrievich, son

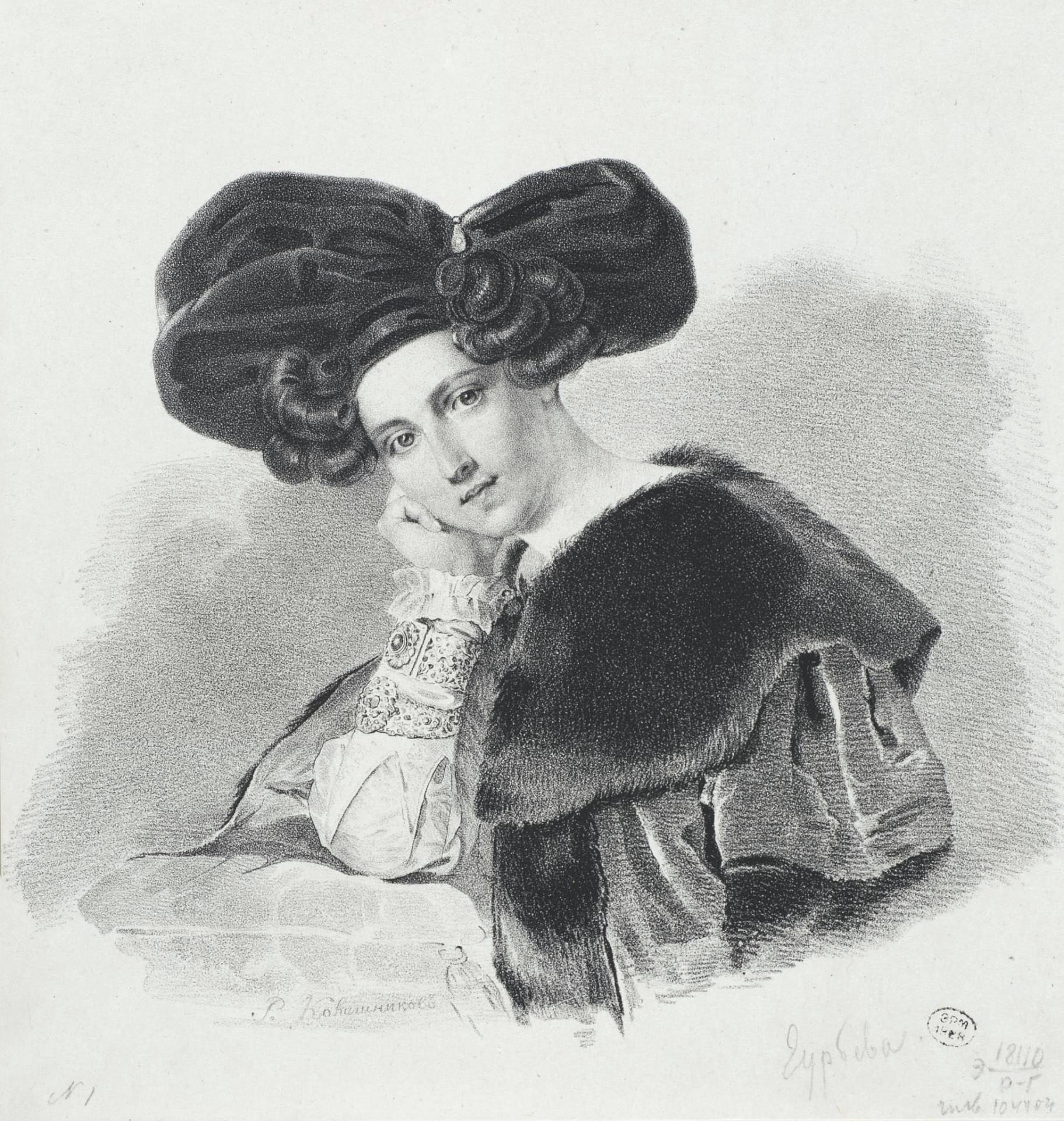
Marina Dmitrievna, daughter–in–law

== Sources ==
- "Гурьев, Дмитрий Александрович" . Brockhaus and Efron Encyclopedic Dictionary (in Russian). 1906.
- Mikhail Alekseev, Alexander Pachkalov. Finance Ministers: From the Russian Empire to the Present Day. Moscow, 2019
- Vlasiy Sudeikin. Guryev, Dmitry Alexandrovich // Brockhaus and Efron Encyclopedic Dictionary: In 86 Volumes (82 Volumes and 4 Additional) – Saint Petersburg, 1890–1907
