= Aleksandr Rudakov (naval officer) =

Russian naval officer (1817–1875)

Governor of Russian Colonies in America
- In office 1853–1854
- Preceded by: Nikolay Yakovlevich Rosenberg
- Succeeded by: Stepan Vasiliyevich Voyevodsky

Aleksandr Ilich Rudakov (Russian: Александр Иванович Рудаков; 1817–1875) was a Russian naval officer and chief manager of the Russian-American Company.

Born in 1817, Rudakov was trained in the Sea Cadet Corps from 1829 to 1832. Throughout the 1830s he toured in the Baltic, Black and the Mediterranean Seas, participating in operations against Imam Shamil. He was promoted to midshipman on 19 December 1834 and to lieutenant on 14 April 1840. He was chief manager of the Russian-American Company's colonies from 1853 to 1854.

Rudakov eventually was promoted to Vice-Admiral, on 1 January 1865 and retired five years later.

Government offices
Preceded by Nikolay Yakovlevich Rosenberg	Governor of Russian Colonies in America; 1853—1854	Succeeded by Stepan Vasiliyevich Voyevodsky
