= Nikolay Yakovlevich Rosenberg =

Nikolay Yakovlevich Rosenberg (Russian: Николай Я́ковлевич Розенберг, 1807–1857) was an officer of the Imperial Russian Navy who was appointed as Chief Manager of the Russian-American Company, effectively Governor of Russian America, serving from 1850 to 1853. He was replaced before the end of the usual 5-year term because of his difficulties in managing relations with the native Tlingit peoples, who were important to the Russian fur trade and their survival. He may also have been called back to Russia to serve in the Crimean War (1853 to 1856), which included naval actions.

In 1935 the United States named Mount Rosenberg for him; it is a 3,050-foot peak on Baranof Island, Alaska.

== History ==
A number of Jewish traders and furriers who had been exiled to Siberia by the Tsar worked for the Russian-American Company. In 1848 Ashkenazi Jewish settlers from Germany began to settle in Sitka, helping develop it and other settlements as cities in the nineteenth century.

According to a brief article about Jews in Alaska by Yereth Rosen in Moment, Nikolay Rosenberg, an Imperial Russian Navy officer, was appointed in 1850 as Chief Manager of the Russian-American Company, effectively Governor of Russian America. Rosen claims that he was Jewish. (But naval officers generally belonged to the aristocracy of Russia and the state Russian Orthodox Church. The Jews were prohibited from any service in the army before 1827; if they converted to Christianity, they received additional rights. Rosenberg may have changed his given and surnames to pass as an ethnic German. He would have had to convert to the state Russian Orthodox Church in order to enter or be promoted as an officer in the navy.)

During Rosenberg's three years of overseeing company operations from New Archangel (Sitka), the naval officer had difficulties with the native peoples. He was described as "especially inept at maintaining good relationships with the Tlingit."

His leadership so antagonised the Sitka Tlingit that a skirmish with them took place outside the settlement. Rosenberg later earned the enmity of the Stikine River-based Tlingit for failure to warn them of the hostile intentions of a Sitka band of Tlingit. Rosenberg was replaced by Aleksandr Ilich Rudakov in 1853. He did not complete what was by then a standard 5-year term as governor, and he may have been called back to Russia as an experienced officer to serve in the Crimean War (1853-1856).

Rosenberg was the first chief manager of the Russian-American Company to be replaced before the end of his term since Semyon Yanovsky, who served from 1818 to 1820. Yanovsky was the first of the exclusively Imperial Russian Navy officers who had been appointed since 1818 as Chief Manager of the RAC.

== Representation in other media ==
- Ivan Doig portrays Rosenberg as a character in his historical novel The Sea Runners (2013). It begins in Russian America in 1853.

== Legacy ==
- In 1935, Mount Rosenberg, a 3,050-foot peak on Baranof Island, was named for Rosenberg.

Government offices
Preceded by Mikhail Tebenkov	Governor of Russian Colonies in America; 1850—1853	Succeeded by Aleksandr Ilich Rudakov
