= Fyodor Golubtsov =

Fyodor Aleksandrovich Golubtsov
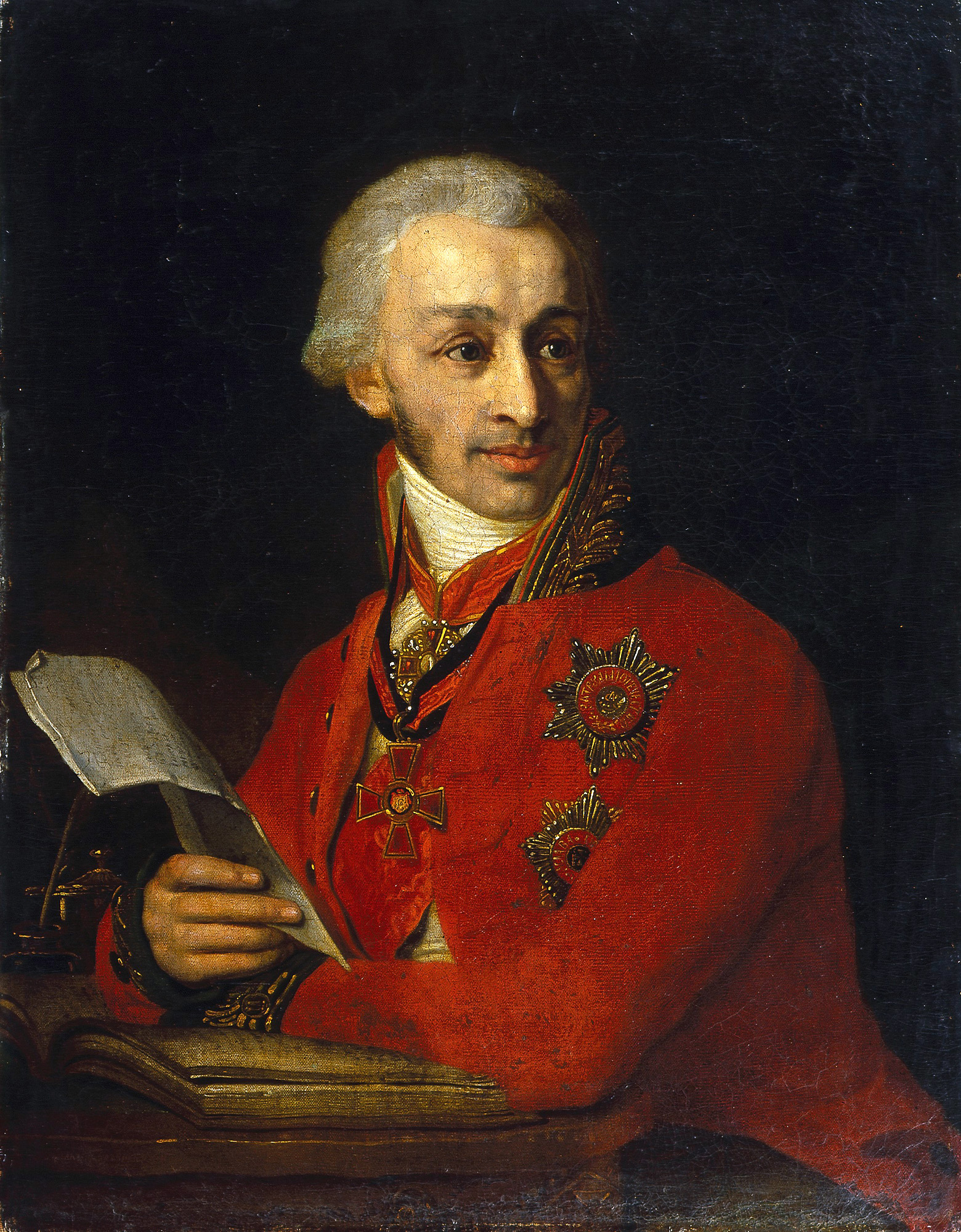
- Portrait by Borovikovskiy

Minister of Finance
- In office August 26, 1807 – January 1, 1810
- Preceded by: Aleksey Vasilev
- Succeeded by: Dmitriy Gurev

Personal details
- Born: January 3, 1759
- Died: March 13, 1829 (aged 70) Volgovo, Petergof Uezd, Peterburg Guberniya, Russian Empire
- Spouse: Melaniya fon Galler (1777–1827)
- Children: No
- Parents: Aleksandr Golubtsov (1735–1796) (father); Anna Vasileva (1741–1816) (mother)
- Awards: Order of Saint Aleksandr Nevskiy

Fyodor Aleksandrovich Golubtsov (January 3, 1759 – March 13, 1829, Volgovo, Peterburg Guberniya) was a Russian statesman; state treasurer (from September 8, 1802, to January 1, 1810), Minister of Finance of the Russian Empire (from August 26, 1807, to January 1, 1810), member of the State Council (from September 7, 1808). Actual Privy Councillor (from September 7, 1808).

During his tenure as minister of finance (1807–1810), he was unable to correct the extremely disorganized state of the state economy.

== Biography ==
Born on January 3, 1759. His mother, Anna Vasileva (1741–1816) was the sister of Aleksey Vasilev.

After graduating from the Artillery and Engineering Gentry Corps in 1775, he began serving in the Senat; in 1785–1790, he was Secretary of the Office of the Senat Prosecutor General Aleksandr Vyazemskiy.

Almost all of his advancement, both in the Senat and in the Treasury Department, he owed to the personal favor of his uncle. In 1797, already under Pavel I, when his uncle was appointed state treasurer, Golubtsov became the manager of the 2nd Expedition of the Expedition on State Revenues. And later, when in 1802 his uncle became the first minister of finance of Rossiya, Golubtsov began to serve under him as state treasurer and, at the same time, on November 6, was appointed senator. This was a time when the new system of governance under Aleksandr I had not yet fully formed. The process of reforming the public administration system coincided with a time when it was simultaneously necessary to solve the country's urgent financial problems. Even under Golubtsov's predecessor, the very first inventory of income and expenditure in 1803 after the establishment of the Ministry of Finance immediately reflected the painful state of the state budget: income was calculated at 97 million 686 thousand 737 rubls, and expenses exceeded them by 13 million 153 thousand 856 rubls. In addition, at the beginning of the 19th century, Rossiya conducted active military operations in Europe against Napoleon, and in the east against Turkey and Persia. A series of military failures, as well as Rossiya's joining the Continental Blockade under the terms of the Treaty of Tilsit in 1807, had an even more detrimental effect on the country's budget. The main source of replenishment of state revenues during these years remained, basically, the issue of paper money – banknotes, which caused a sharp fall in the rubl exchange rate. In addition to purely budgetary difficulties, there were also problems in the management system of the Ministry of Finance itself. After the death of Aleksey Vasilev, who enjoyed great personal trust from the emperor, the department essentially remained without an appointed head for almost two years.

At the end of August 1807, Fyodor Golubtsov, who was also the state treasurer, was appointed as the head of the Ministry of Finance. He officially received the post of minister only in 1809. Before this, in 1808, he transformed the Expedition on State Revenues: its 1st, 2nd and 4th Expeditions were united, and on the basis of the 3rd and 5th in 1809, the State Expedition for Auditing Accounts was established – a single financial control body of the civil department. Under Golubtsov, rules were issued on the audit of state accounts and internal loans (the first internal state loan was carried out in 1809).

The finance committee (formed in 1806 and existing until 1917) took direct part in the development of the state's financial policy and, to some extent, in the development of the ministry's management structure. The activities of this committee until 1906 were completely secret and closed to the general public. Formed to review the state budget and eliminate the budget deficit, it simultaneously dealt with all problems of state finances that were posed to the minister of finance and the State Audit Office. As the highest interdepartmental body with special powers attached to it, the committee could facilitate the implementation of the measures proposed by the minister of finance. The members of this secret institution developed rules for all loans, both internal and external, and also monitored the circulation of funds and were engaged in the development of state credit. For most of his term, even without being officially appointed minister of finance, Fyodor Golubtsov (as State Treasurer) largely simply carried out decisions made by the finance committee.

As is known, fundamental changes in the state structure were developed by Mikhail Speranskiy, who at that time did not yet hold the post of secretary of state. In November 1809, Emperor Aleksandr I instructed him to prepare an urgent program to overcome the financial crisis. Temporary and disjointed measures could no longer solve the accumulated problems of the state budget. To prepare the project, a special committee was formed, in the discussion of which the permanent Deputy of the minister of finance, Dmitriy Gurev, who had become very close to Speranskiy in recent years, took an active part. A pragmatist and subtle courtier, Gurev used all his intellect and Speranskiy's growing influence in the struggle for the ministerial seat, and in 1810 Golubtsov was dismissed – formally, "in connection with the establishment of the State Council and the renewal of the entire composition of the highest administration". Outwardly demonstrating his commitment to Speranskiy's new ministerial system, aimed at strengthening the vertical of power, Dmitriy Gurev (under the latter's patronage) was appointed minister of finance on January 1, 1810, and simultaneously a member of the new reformed State Council.

After being removed from his post as minister of finance, Fyodor Golubtsov retained his membership in the State Council. During the War of 1812, by choice of the Sankt–Peterburg Nobility, he became a representative of the Economic Committee for the Formation of the Militia.

He died on March 13, 1829, in the village of Volgovo, Petergof Uezd, Peterburg Guberniya.

In 1805 he married Melaniya fon Galler (1777–1827). In the same year he was awarded the Order of Saint Aleksandr Nevskiy.

Gallery

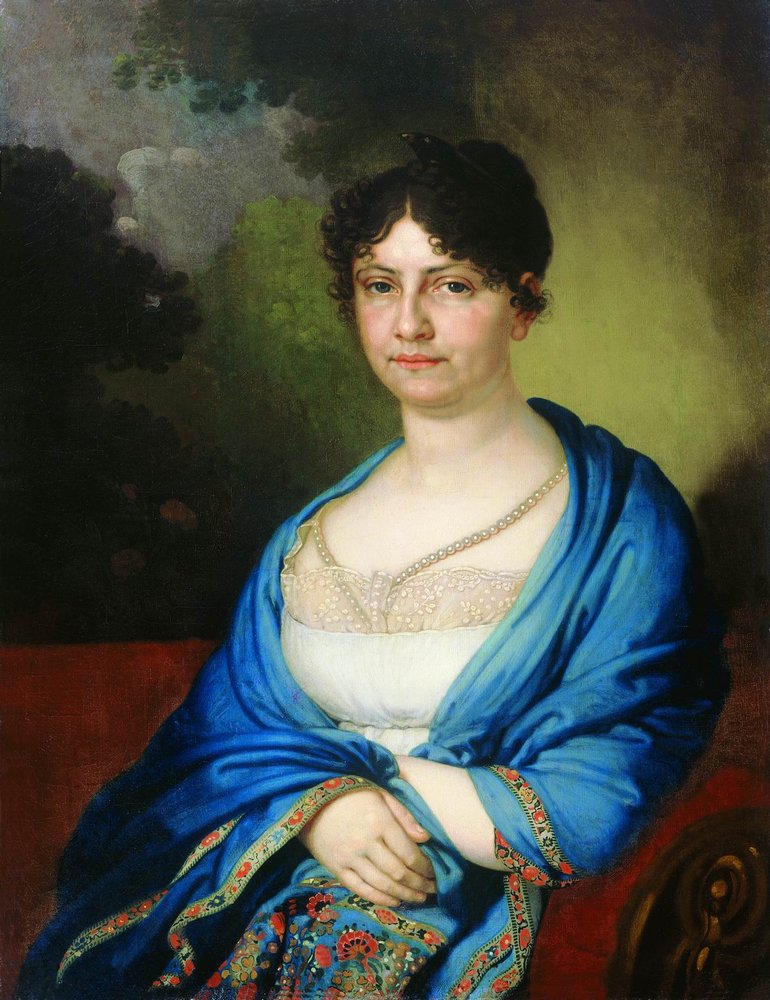
Wife, Melaniya Golubtsova, in a portrait by Borovikovskiy

== Awards ==
- Order of Saint Vladimir, 4th Degree (September 22, 1786);
- Order of Saint Anna, 1st Degree (March 13, 1799);
- Order of Saint Aleksandr Nevskiy (January 1, 1805);
- Order of Saint Vladimir, 2nd Degree (June 25, 1806).

== Sources ==
- Vlasiy Sudeykin. Golubtsov, Fyodor Aleksandrovich // Brockhaus and Efron Encyclopedic Dictionary: in 86 Volumes (82 Volumes and 4 Additional) – Sankt–Peterburg, 1893 – Volume IX – Page 122
- Golubtsov Fyodor Aleksandrovich // the Great Russian Encyclopedia: in 35 Volumes / Editor–in–Chief Yuriy Osipov – Moskva: the Great Russian Encyclopedia, 2004–2017
- Denis Shilov. Statesmen of the Russian Empire: Heads of Higher and Central Institutions, 1802–1917: Biographical Handbook – 2nd Edition, Revised and Supplemented – Sankt–Peterburg, 2002 – Page 200
