= Alexander Alexandrovich Fischer von Waldheim =

Russian botanist (1839–1920)

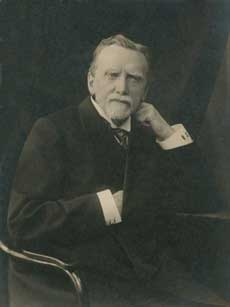
Fischer von Waldheim AA

Alexander Alexandrovich Fischer von Waldheim (Russian: Александр Александрович Фишер фон Вальдгейм, pronounced [ɐlʲɪkˈsandr ɐlʲɪkˈsandrəvʲɪt͡ɕ ˈfʲɪʂɨr fon ˈvalʲdɡʲɪjm]; born 20 April 1839 in Moscow, Russian Empire – died 24 February 1920 in Sochi, Russia) was a Russian botanist. He was a director of the Saint Petersburg Botanical Garden. He was the son of Alexandr Grigorievich Fischer von Waldheim (1803–1884) and the grandson of Gotthelf Fischer von Waldheim. In 1853, he was elected as a member to the American Philosophical Society.
