= Stepan Vasiliyevich Voyevodsky =

Russian naval officer (1803–1884)

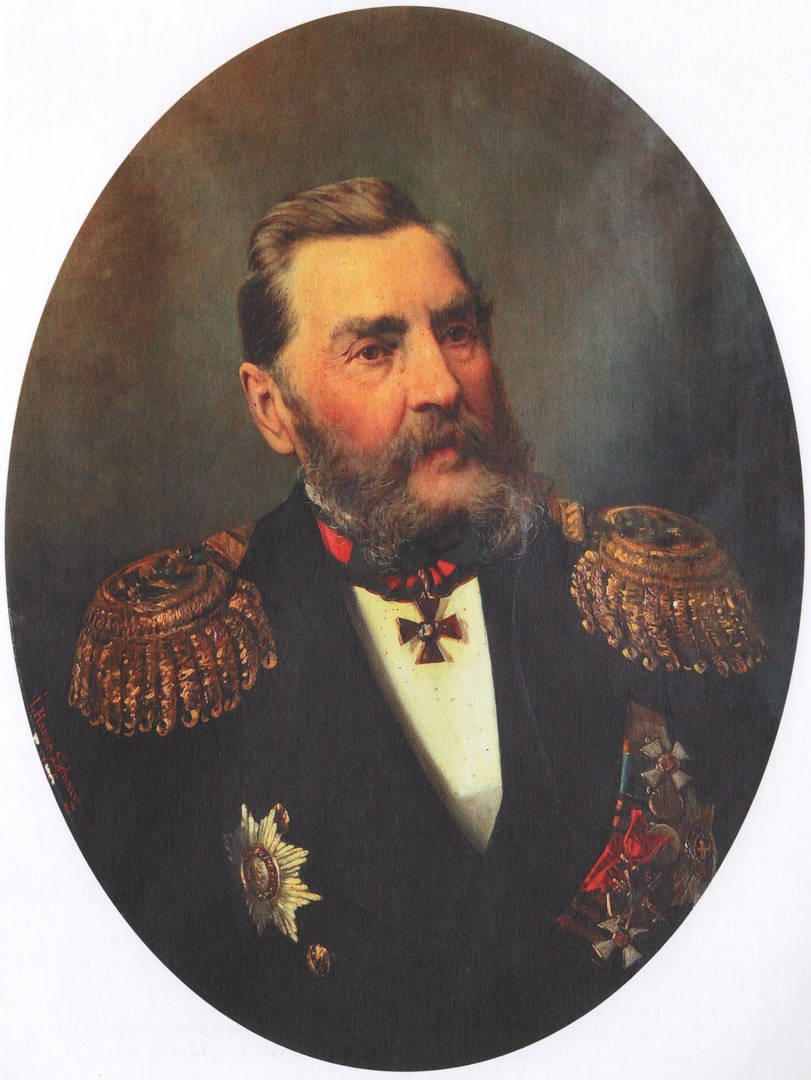
Stepan Vasiliyevich Voyevodsky

Stepan Vasilievich Voyevodsky (Russian: Степан Васильевич Воеводский; 1803 – September 17, 1884) was an admiral of the Imperial Russian Navy, Governor of Russian America in 1854–1859, and military governor of Astrakhan in the 1860s.

Voyevodsky was born in Smolensk Governorate in the family of a retired Army officer. He joined the Naval Cadets Corps in 1818 and was commissioned as a midshipman (Russian: мичман) in March 1822.

Voyevodsky served in the Baltic Fleet until 1834. In 1824 Voyevodsky sailed to Iceland, and in 1825 to the Mediterranean Sea. In 1827–1830, lieutenant Voyevodsky served on Jezekiel, a ship-of-the-line of count Login Geiden's Mediterranean squadron. He participated in the Battle of Navarino in October 1827 and in the naval blockade of the Dardanelles during the Russo-Turkish War of 1828–1829.

After four peaceful seasons with the Baltic Fleet (1830–1834) Voyevodsky was transferred from the Navy to the Russian-American Company. He crossed Asia by land, reaching Okhotsk, and sailed to Novoarkhangelsk with Sitka. He commanded Sitka and Yelena until 1839 and was promoted to captain-lieutenant in 1837. In 1841 he sailed from the Pacific to Saint Petersburg, and returned to the Baltic Fleet. By 1849 he attained the rank of captain (Russian: капитан первого ранга) and was in command of a ship-of-the-line.

In the beginning of the Crimean War (July 1853), Voyevodsky was appointed Governor of Russian America. He reached Novoarkhangelsk aboard Sitka in April 1854, but the ship was soon seized by the British. Apart from this accident, the war did not hurt Russian America directly: the lands of Russian America and the British Hudson's Bay Company were declared neutral territories and remained neutral throughout the war. Voyevodsky remained in charge of Russian America until June 1859; upon his return to Russia he was appointed commander of Astrakhan port and military governor of Astrakhan.

Voyevodsky attained the rank of full admiral in 1877. He died in Saint Petersburg and was buried at the Smolenskoye Cemetery.

Preceded by Aleksandr Ilich Rudakov	Governor of Russian Colonies in America; 1854—1859	Succeeded by Johan Hampus Furuhjelm
