= Karl Nesselrode =

Russian diplomat (1780–1862)

His High Excellency Karl von Nesselrode
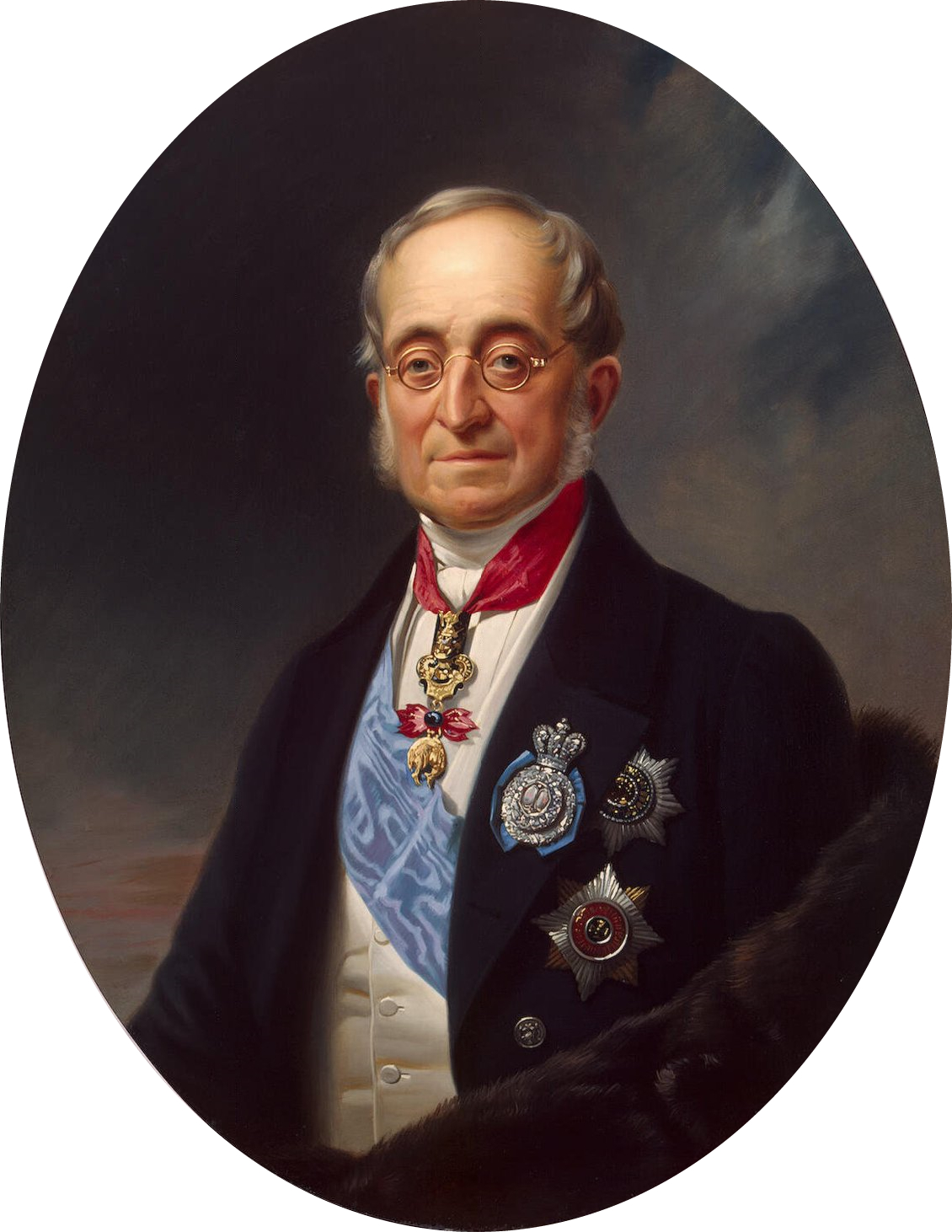

Chancellor of the Russian Empire
- In office 17 March 1844 – 23 March 1862
- Preceded by: Viktor Kochubey
- Succeeded by: Alexander Gorchakov

Foreign Minister of the Russian Empire
- In office 9 August 1816 – 15 April 1856 Serving with Ioannis Kapodistrias (1816–1822)
- Preceded by: Nikolay Rumyantsev
- Succeeded by: Alexander Gorchakov

Personal details
- Born: 14 December 1780 Lisbon, Portugal
- Died: 23 March 1862 (aged 81) Saint Petersburg, Russia
- Resting place: Smolensky Lutheran Cemetery; 59°57′0″N 30°15′0″E
- Spouse: Maria Guryeva (m. 1812; died 1849)
- Relations: Nesselrode family
- Children: Elena; Dimitri; Marie
- Parent(s): Wilhelm von Nesselrode (father); Louise Gontard (mother)
- Occupation: Politician; diplomat; soldier
- Awards: See: § Honours

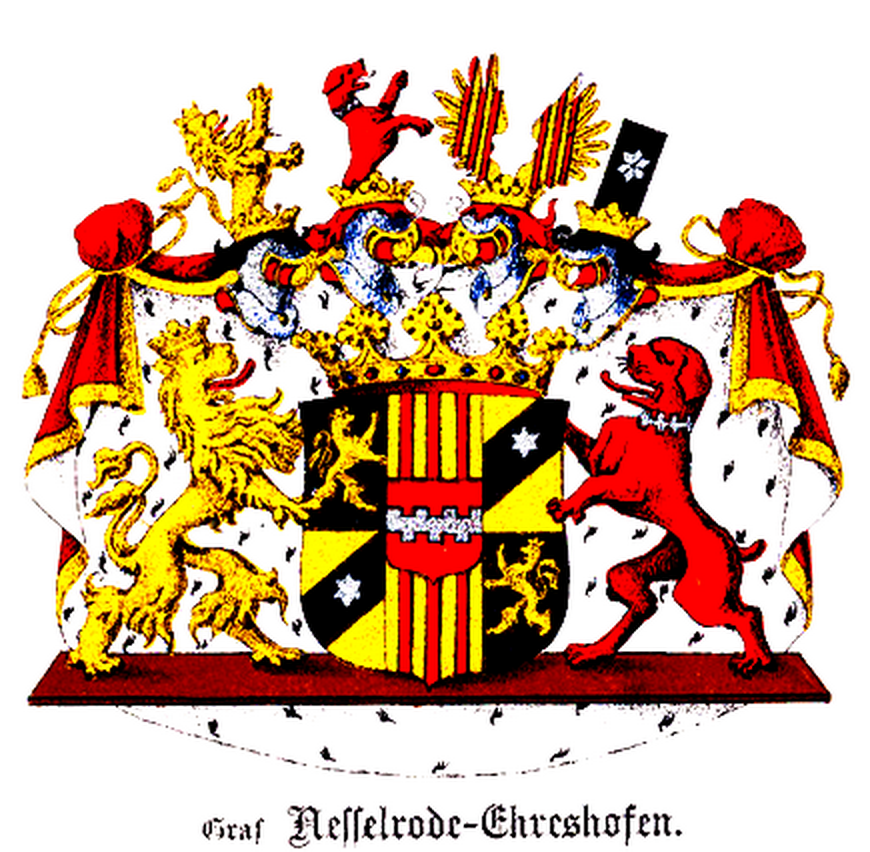
Coat of arms of the comital Nesselrode family of 1710, in the Baltic Coat of arms book by Carl Arvid von Klingspor in 1882.

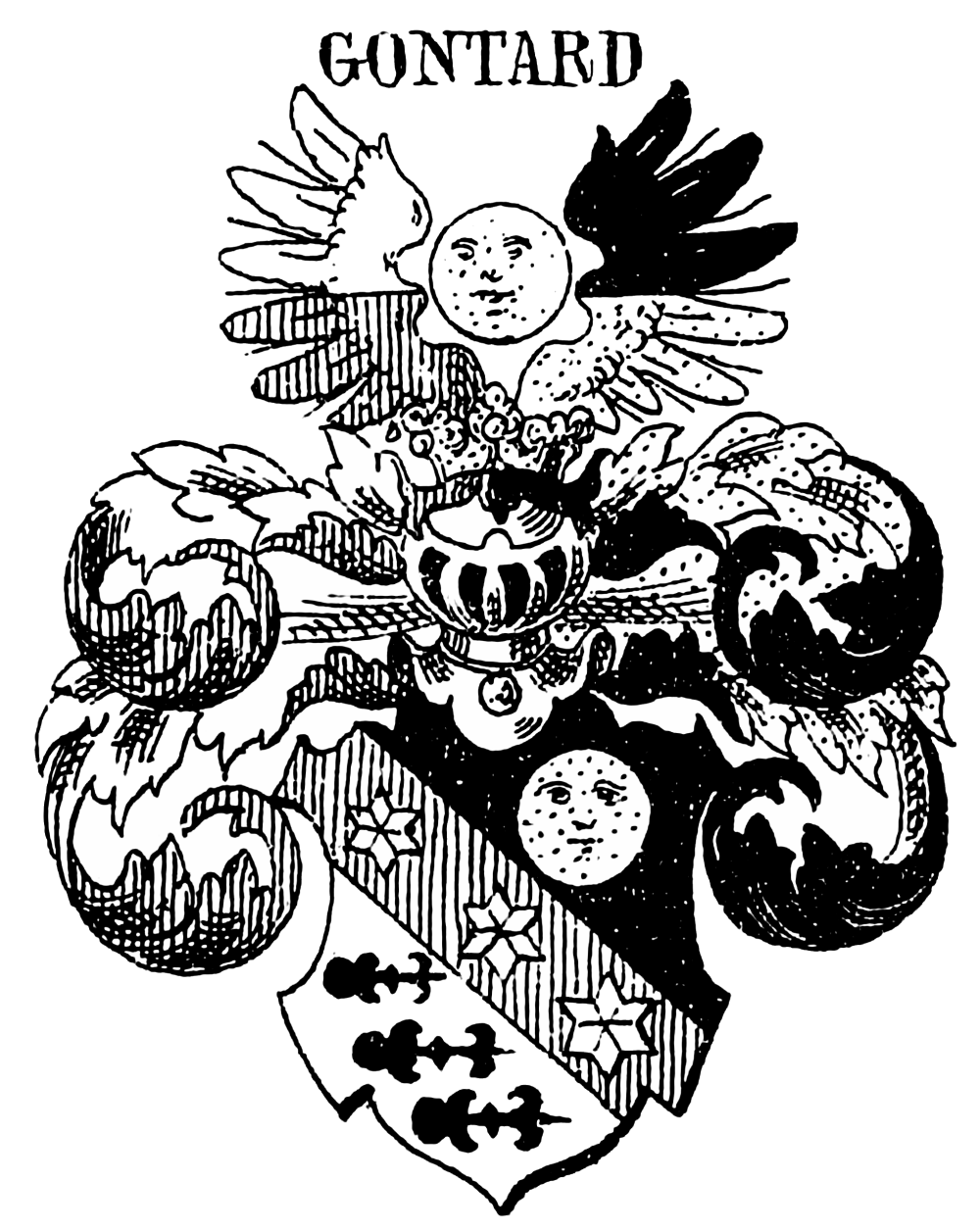
Coat of arms of the Huguenot Gontard family of Karl's mother, Louise Gontard (1746–1785)

Karl Robert Reichsgraf von Nesselrode-Ehreshoven (Russian: Карл Васильевич Нессельроде, romanized: Karl Vasilyevich Nesselrode; 14 December 1780 – 23 March 1862), also known as Charles de Nesselrode, was a Russian diplomat of German noble descent. From 1816 to 1856, Nesselrode guided Russian policy as foreign minister. He was also a leading European conservative statesman of the Holy Alliance.

== Early life ==
Karl was born at sea near Lisbon, Portugal into the prominent Uradel German House of Nesselrode, which originated in the Bergisches Land near the Rhine. His father Count Wilhelm Karl von Nesselrode (1724–1810), a Count of the Holy Roman Empire, served at the time as the ambassador to Portugal for the German-born Catherine the Great. His mother was Louise Gontard (1746–1785), whose family belonged to Huguenot noble families from Dauphiné that fled from France to Germany in 1700. In deference to his mother's Protestantism he was baptized in the chapel of the British Embassy, thus becoming a member of the Church of England.

== Biography ==
After his father became the Russian ambassador to the Prussian court about 1787, Nesselrode's education in a Berlin gymnasium reinforced his Germanic roots. Even though Nesselrode would work for the Russians for the next few decades of his life, he could neither read nor write Russian and spoke it only brokenly.

In 1788, at the age of 8, he officially entered the Imperial Russian Navy. With his father's influence, he secured the position of naval aide-de-camp to Emperor Paul (r. 1796–1801).

He then transferred to the Imperial Russian Army, and entered diplomatic service under Paul I's son and successor, Emperor Alexander I. He was attached to the Russian embassy at Berlin, and transferred thence to The Hague.

In August 1806 Nesselrode received a commission to travel in southern Germany to report on the French troops there; he was then attached as diplomatic secretary to General Mikhail Kamensky, and then to (ethnic German) generals Friedrich Wilhelm von Buxhoeveden and Levin August von Bennigsen in succession.

He was present at the inconclusive Battle of Eylau in January 1807, fought by Count von Bennigsen, and assisted at the negotiations of the Peace of Tilsit (July 1807), for which he was commended by Spanish Bonapartist Diego Fernandez de Velasco, 13th Duke of Frías (who in 1811 would die in exile in Paris). During negotiations he was seated at the table with Napoleon I.

Following the Congress of Erfurt in 1808, Nesselrode was secretly accredited by Alexander to serve as his unofficial channel of information between himself and Talleyrand and the marquis de Caulaincourt, formerly ambassador in St Petersburg, both of whom were hostile to Napoleon's policy of aggression. After the breach of diplomatic relations with Russia in 1811, Nesselrode returned to St Petersburg by way of Vienna in order to exchange views with Metternich. He sought to persuade Alexander to open negotiations with Napoleon, if only to throw the onus of breaking the peace entirely on the French side. He joined the tsar's headquarters at Vilna in March 1812 and, though Rumiantzov was still foreign minister, it was Nesselrode who directed the foreign policy of Russia from this time forward.

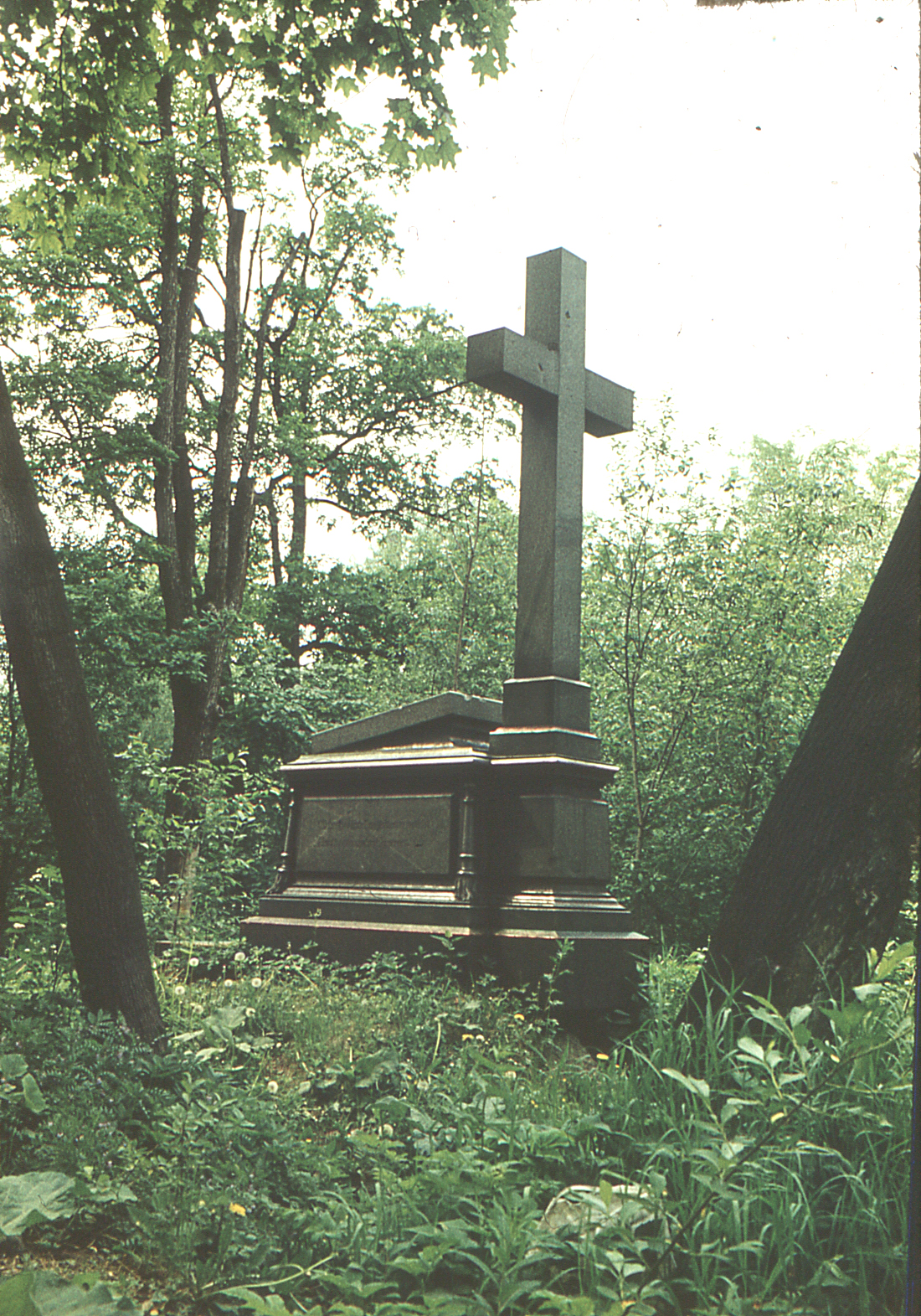
Nesselrode's tomb in the Smolensky Lutheran Cemetery

Nesselrode was present at the battle of Leipzig and accompanied the invading army to Paris; he negotiated the capitulation of Auguste de Marmont and Édouard Mortier at Clichy, and signed the Treaty of Chaumont on 1 March 1814. His former relations with Talleyrand facilitated negotiations in Paris, and his influence with the emperor was used in favour of the restoration of the Bourbons, and, after the Battle of Waterloo, against the imposition of a ruinous war indemnity on France.

Nesselrode became State Secretary in 1814 and was the head of Russia's official delegation to the Congress of Vienna, but for the most part Alexander I acted as his own foreign minister. In 1816, Nesselrode became Russian foreign minister, sharing the position with Count Ioannis Kapodistrias until the latter's retirement in 1822.

For forty years, Nesselrode guided Russian policy and was a leading European conservative statesman of the Holy Alliance. He was a key contributor in the construction of the peaceable congress system after the Napoleonic Wars. Between 1845 and 1856, he served as Chancellor of the Russian Empire. As Minister of Foreign Affairs in 1824, he was a plenipotentiary during negotiations with the United States in defining the boundary between Russian America and the American claims known as the Oregon Country, which were resolved with the Russo-American Treaty of 1824, and a parallel treaty with Britain concerning British claims which overlapped with those of the U.S. A century later in 1924, Mount Nesselrode in the Boundary Ranges of the Alaska-British Columbia boundary was named for him.

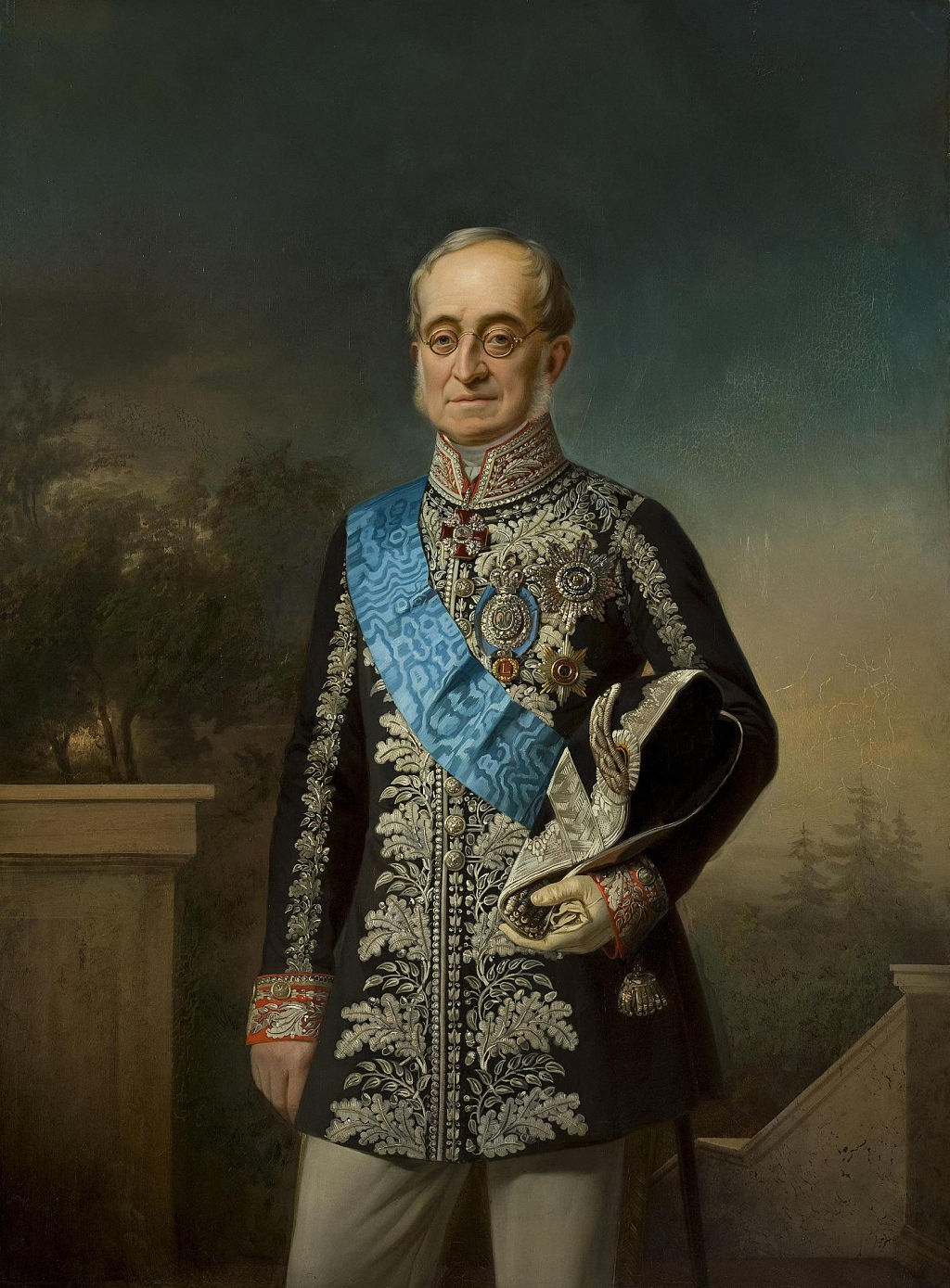
Portrait by Georg von Bothmann, c. 1870

Nesselrode is credited as the person who first coined the name "Tournament of Shadows", which was the Russian name for the long rivalry that existed between the Russian Empire and the British Empire beginning in the late 18th and lasting well into the 19th centuries, caused primarily by border tension in Central Asia and India.

In 1849 Nesselrode sent Russian troops to aid Austria in putting down the Hungarian Revolution led by Lajos Kossuth.

One frequently-overlooked facet of Nesselrode's activity involved his attempts to penetrate Japan's self-isolation. In 1853 he dispatched Yevfimiy Putyatin with a letter to the shōgun; Putyatin returned to Saint Petersburg with the favorable Treaty of Shimoda (signed 1855).

Nesselrode's efforts to expand Russia's influence in the Balkans and Mediterranean led to conflicts with the Ottoman Empire, Britain, France, and the Kingdom of Sardinia, which all became allies opposing Russia in the Crimean War (1853–1856). Britain and France, unhappy with Russia's growing influence, determined to support Turkey and so restrict Russia.

Nesselrode's autobiography was published posthumously in 1866.

== Marriage and issue ==
He was married to Russian noblewoman Maria Guryeva (1786–1849) and had issue:

- Countess Elena von Nesselrode (1815–1875) married Count Michail Chreptowicz (1809–1892); didn't have issue
- Count Dimitri von Nesselrode (1816–1891) married Countess Lydia Zakrevskaya (1826–1884); had issue
- Countess Marie von Nesselrode (1820–1888) married Count Albin Leo von Seebach (1811–1884); had issue

== Honours ==
- Knight of the Order of Saint Alexander Nevsky.
- Knight grand Cross of the Order of Saint Vladimir.
- Knight of the Order of the Elephant.
- Knight grand Cross of the Order of the Polar Star.
- Knight grand Cross of the Order of the Crown.
- Knight grand Cross of the Royal Guelphic Order.
- Knight grand Cross of the House Order of Fidelity.
- Knight of the Order of the White Eagle.
- Knight grand Cross of the Order of Saint Stephen of Hungary.
- Knight grand Cross of the Order of the Holy Ghost.
- Knight grand Cross of the Order of Saint Michael.
- Knight grand Cross of the Order of the Black Eagle.
- Knight grand Cross of the Order of the Red Eagle.
- Knight grand Cross of the Supreme Order of the Most Holy Annunciation.
- Knight grand Cross of the Order of Charles III.
- Knight grand Cross of the Order of Saint Ferdinand and of Merit.
- Grand Cross in the Legion of Honour.

== Cuisine legacy ==
Foods named in his honour but devised by his chef M. Jean Mouy using chestnut puree are-

- Nesselrode Pudding (Pouding à la Nesselrode), a thick custard cream with sweet puree of chestnut, raisins, candied fruit, currants, cherry liquor and whipped cream molded and served chilled as a bombe with maraschino custard sauce.
- Nesselrode Pie, a chestnut custard cream pie

== Sources ==
- "Нессельроде, Карл Роберт" . Brockhaus and Efron Encyclopedic Dictionary (in Russian). 1906.

Preceded by Nikolay Petrovich Rumyantsev	Foreign Minister of Russia; 1816–1856 with Ioannis Kapodistrias (1816–1822)	Succeeded by Aleksandr Mikhailovich Gorchakov
