= Benzion Judah Berkowitz =

Russian scholar

- Born: 23 July 1803
- Died: 11 May 1879 (aged 75); Vilna, Vilna Governorate, Russian Empire
- Writing career
- Literary movement: Haskalah

Benzion Judah ben Eliahu Berkowitz (Yiddish: בן־ציון יהודה בן אליהו בערקאָוויץ, romanized: Ben-Tsiyon Yehuda ben Eliyahu Berkovits; 23 July 1803 – 11 May 1879) was a Russian Hebrew scholar, who published a number of works devoted to the study of the Targum Onkelos. His contributions to the area were acknowledged by such scholars as Berliner and other specialists on the Targum. He also contributed to the Hebrew periodicals Pirḥe Tzafon, Ha-Karmel, Otzar Ḥokhmah, and Ha-Maggid.

== Publications ==
- Oteh or. Vilna: Menaḥem Mann Romm. 1843.
- Leḥem ve-simlah. Vol. 1–2. Vilna: Yosef Reuven Romm. 1850–1855.
- Ḥalifot semalot. Vilna: Yehuda Leib Lipman. 1874.
- Avne tsiyon. Vilna: Ha-almana veha-aḥim Romm. 1877. Addenda to Nathan Adler's Netinah la-ger.
