= Alexander Grigorievich Fischer von Waldheim =

German-born Russian botanist

Alexander Grigorievich Fischer von Waldheim (Russian: Александр Григорьевич Фишер фон Вальдгейм; 7 May 1803 – 13 July 1884) was a German-born Russian botanist. He was the son of the naturalist Gotthelf Fischer von Waldheim and father of the botanist Alexandr Alexandrovich Fischer von Waldheim.

== Life and work ==
Fischer von Waldheim was the son of Gotthelf Fischer von Waldheim and his godfather was Alexander von Humboldt. He learned botany from an early age at home, went to the Moscow gymnasium followed by board school before joining Moscow University in 1817 where he was trained under K. L. Goldbach and G. F. Hoffmann. He became a professor of botany and pharmacology at the Moscow Medical Surgical Academy in 1826. He married Natalie, daughter of Hoffmann in 1830 and became director of the botanical garden after the death of his father-in-law. The Medical Surgical Academy was dissolved in 1843 and he then held positions at the Lomonosov University. He resigned in 1865.

He took a special interest in plant anatomy and designed a microscope along with Vincent Chevalier. He was a secretary for the Société Impériale des Naturalistes de Moscou from 1825 to 1835 and served as its president from 1872 to 1884. He was awarded a Grand Cross of the Russian order of St. Anne and a Grand Cross of the Württemberg Friedrich Order. His son Alexander served as a professor of botany in Warsaw from 1897 to 1917.

The standard author abbreviation Fisch.Waldh. is used to indicate this person as the author when citing a botanical name.
