= Maria Nesselrode =

Russian courtier (1786–1849)

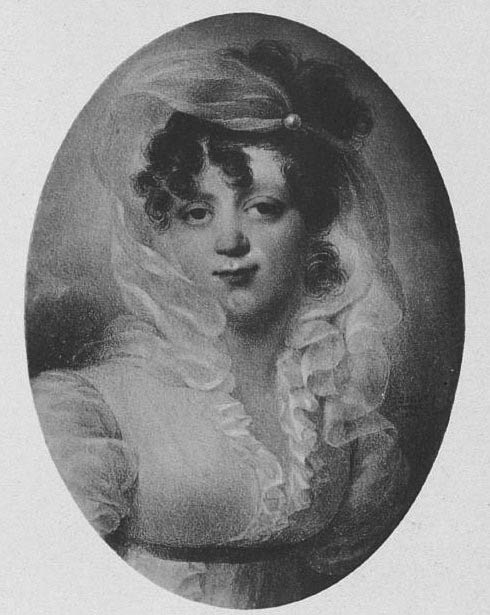
Portrait by Jean-Baptiste Isabey, 1814

Countess Maria von Nesselrode-Ehreshoven, also known as Maria Dmitriyevna Nesselrode (Russian: Мария Дмитриевна Нессельроде; née Guryeva; 1786–1849), was a Russian noblewoman and lady-in-waiting.

== Early life ==
Maria was born as the eldest daughter of Count Dmitry Guryev (1758–1825), who served as an imperial chamberlain and the minister of finance, and his wife, Countess Praskovya Nikolayevna Saltykova (1764–1830).

== Court life ==
She served as a lady-in-waiting to Empress Elizabeth Alexeievna of Russia. She was married to a German nobleman in the service of Catherine the Great, Count Karl von Nesselrode-Ehreshoven, who was the Russian minister of foreign affairs for many years and hence politically powerful. She was a leading socialite in Saint Petersburg society and court life, hosted an influential salon, had high positions within philanthropy, and was described as politically active through her spouse. She was also noted for her enmity towards Pushkin.

== Sources ==
- Таньшина Н. Русский кисель на немецкой закваске. Неофициальный портрет Карла Нессельроде // Родина : журнал. — Москва, 2009. — № 5. — С. 75-79.
