= First Russian Antarctic Expedition =

1819–1821 expedition to explore the Southern Ocean and Antarctica

- First Russian Antarctic Expedition route
- Type: Scientific expedition
- Date: 1819 – 1821
- Executed by: Fabian Bellingshausen, Mikhail Lazarev.

The First Russian Antarctic Expedition took place in 1819–1821 under the direction of Fabian Bellingshausen and Mikhail Lazarev. The expedition aimed to reach the Southern Ocean in order to prove or disprove the existence of a suspected seventh continent, Antarctica. The sloop Vostok was under the command of Bellingshausen, while Lazarev commanded the sloop Mirny. Overall, the crew consisted of 190 people.

Due to extreme haste in equipping the voyage (the order was released on March 15, and the departure took place on July 4, 1819), it was impossible to assemble a science team. Thus, almost all scientific observations in the fields of geography, ethnography, and natural history were conducted by officers and the only scientist on board, associate professor Ivan Mikhailovich Simonov, who taught at the Imperial Kazan University. A novice painter, Pavel Mikhailov, was hired to depict the events, landscapes, and biological species encountered during the expedition. His paintings of the South Shetland Islands were used in English sailing directions until the 1940s.

The Russian Antarctic expedition ended in complete success and became the second expedition to circumnavigate Antarctica after James Cook's expedition a half century earlier. Of the expedition's 751 days, 527 were spent at sea; the overall length of the route was 49,860 nautical miles. For 127 days the expedition was above 60° south latitude; the crew approached the Antarctic shore nine times, four times as close as 13–15 kilometres (8.1–9.3 mi) from the continent. Around 28 objects were depicted on the map of Antarctica which emerged, and 29 islands in high southern latitudes and the tropics were discovered and named.

The results of the expedition were published in Russian in 1831 in two volumes with the drawings applied in an atlas. In 1842, a short report was published in Germany. In 1945, a full English translation of Bellingshausen's only book was edited by polar explorer Frank Debenham and released.

== Planning and organization ==
=== Background ===
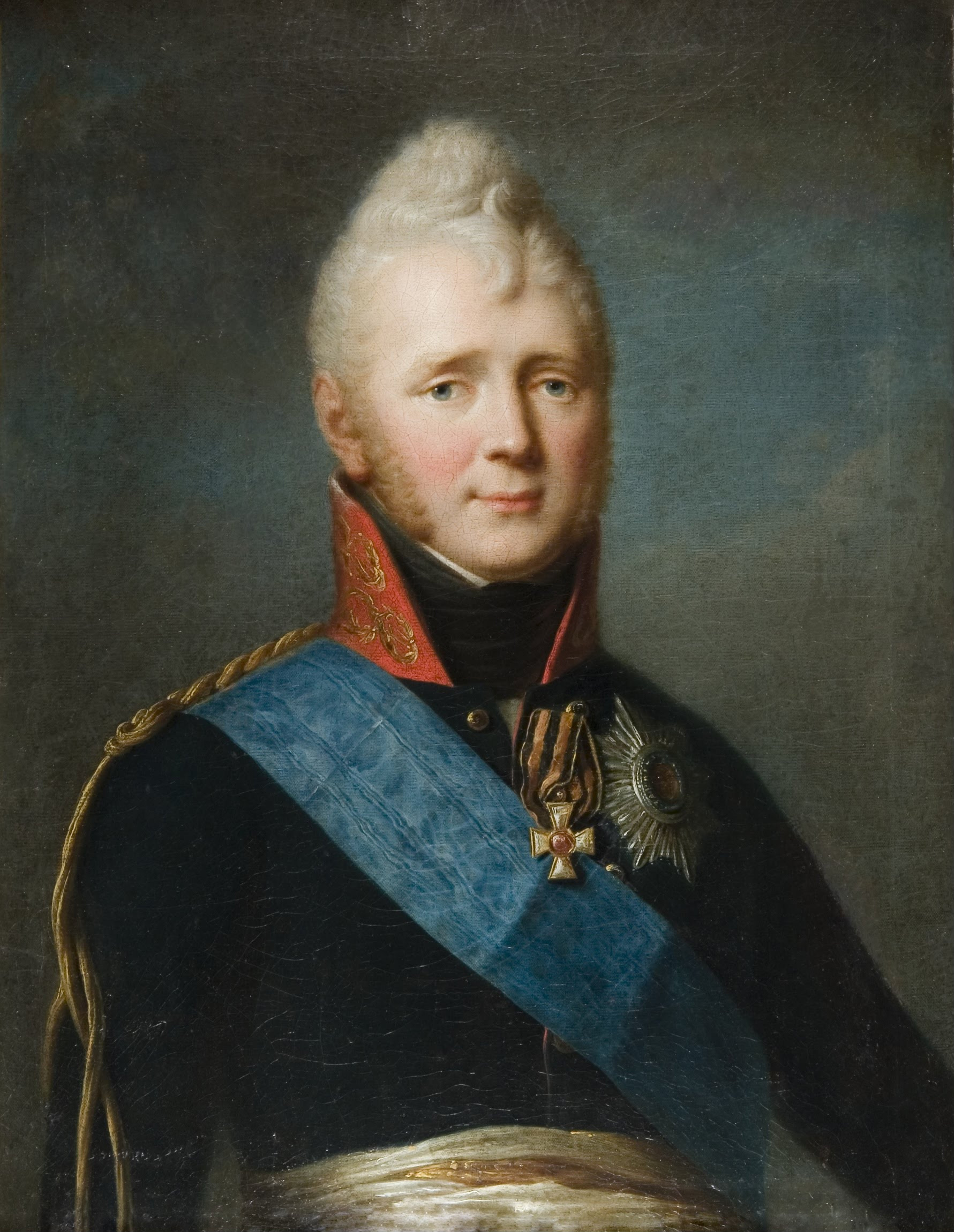
Portrait of Emperor Alexander I by Stepan Shchukin, 1800

Bellingshausen and Lazarev's Antarctic expedition was equipped around the same time as a similar expedition to the Arctic taken on by Mikhail Vasilyev and Gleb Shishmaryov on the sloops Otkrytie and Blagonamerennyi. In the 1950s, historians raised the question of who initiated the two Russian expeditions in the high north and south polar latitudes. The prevailing opinion at that time was that in the 1810s, Adam Johann von Krusenstern, Gavril Sarychev, and Vasily Golovnin independently presented the two projects. On the contrary, English writers believed that the plan came from a minister of the Ministry of Sea Forces, Jean Baptiste Traversay. This theory was promoted by Hugh Robert Mill, a librarian of the Royal Geographical Society, and Frank Debenham, director of the Scott Polar Research Institute at the University of Cambridge. Ivan Mikhailovich Simonov, astronomer and head of the Bellingshausen expedition, claimed that it was Emperor Alexander I of Russia who initiated the voyage.

According to Tammiksaar and T. Kiik, in 1818 Alexander I was highly interested in the results of Kotzebue's round-the-world voyage on the sloop Rurik. In September, the Emperor requested a detailed report on the expedition. The report was prepared by Krusenstern, who also sent Traversay the manuscript of his article on the first attempt of Vasily Chichagov in 1765–1766 to reach high Arctic latitudes. Traversay then managed to make the Emperor interested – Krusenstern reported on it on January 26 [O.S. January 14].

Krusenstern saw that the government's mood was favorable toward sending a state scientific expedition to Antarctica. Kotzebue's discoveries in the northern part of the Pacific Ocean provided a benchmark for reaching the Arctic Ocean through the Bering Strait. In his report to Traversay, Krusenstern also mentioned Bellingshausen as a potential candidate for the head of the expedition. By January 1819, the Emperor approved this plan, although Gleb Shishmaryov was appointed as head of the expedition instead.

In this context, it is not clear how the expedition became global, and how the plan of also researching the south polar region appeared. In the 18th and 19th centuries, any attempt to reach the hypothetical southern continent was dictated by the geographical theories that were in vogue at that time. One popular theory held that the large landmasses of the Northern Hemisphere should be balanced in the Southern Hemisphere; otherwise, the Earth could tip over.

On January 17, 1773, James Cook became the first navigator to cross the Antarctic Circle during his second circumnavigation. However, when he reached 67°15′ south latitude, he faced insurmountable sea ice. In January 1774, Cook reached 71°10′ south latitude, but was again stopped by sea ice. Though Cook never denied the existence of a Southern continent, he thought that it was impossible to reach:

...The most substantial part of the Southern continent (if we assume it exists) should lie within the polar region above the southern arctic circle. Still, sea there is so covered with ice that accessing the land is impossible. The risk associated with sailing to these undiscovered and under-researched and covered with ice seas in search of the Southern continent is so large that I can bravely claim that not a single person will reach South further than I was able to do. Southern lands will never be researched.

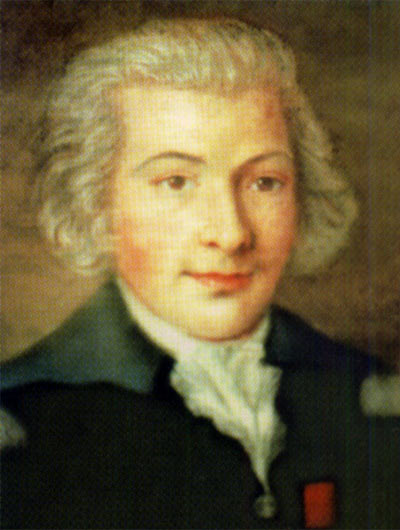
Portrait of the minister Traversay

Krusenstern completely trusted Cook's authority and directly stated that the famous English navigator had "buried" the idea of Terra Australis. Soon after Kotzebue's return, on July 30 [O.S. July 18] 1818, Krusenstern presented his project on researching the Pacific region in the belts at 20° north and south of the equator to the president of the Saint Petersburg Academy of Sciences Sergey Uvarov. The aim of the project was to explore undiscovered archipelagos and put an end to the Age of Discovery. He suggested that the project be implemented as a joint venture between the academy and the Ministry of Sea Forces. Krusenstern also mentioned this project in his foreword to the 1821 report on the Kotzebue expedition.

As a result of this history, Tammiksaar and Kiik concluded that in addition to the political aims, Traversay initiated this expedition in order to outperform the results of Cook's voyage. This has been indirectly shown by the fact that Traversay did not discuss the south polar project with any of the experienced ocean navigators that were subordinated to him. Also, some notes in French and Russian with extracts from the description of Cook's voyage and an estimate of the plan for sending two sloops – one to the Arctic and one the Antarctic – are stored in Traversay's personal papers in the Russian State Archive of the Navy. The minister later asked Sarychev, who had bad relations with Krusenstern and Kotzebue, to develop recommendations for a detailed plan. These anonymous notes do not mention such notions as "The North Pole" or "The South Pole".

On January 22 [O.S. January 10] 1819, Traversay met Tsar Alexander I. As of 2014, there were no documents on the initial stage of the double expedition project. The project may have been secret. Finally, on April 12 [O.S. March 31] 1819, the Emperor personally signed an order authorizing 100,000 rubles to finance the expedition. At the same time, Krusenstern sent a detailed letter to Traversay from Hagudi which implies that he was not informed about the negotiations taking place in high circles of power. According to Traversay's personal papers, the minister personally formulated the geographical objectives of both of the expeditions. Later, these items were included in the instructions published in Bellingshausen's report. Probably the main consultant was Sarychev.

Due to a lack of documentary evidence, it is almost impossible to determine why the expedition was equipped in such haste, why the funding was doubled, or why four ships were sent instead of two. On February 15 [O.S. February 3] 1819, Traversay signed the order forming the expedition on behalf of the Emperor. In Traversay's documents, units were called "divisions". According to the available data, Krusenstern's role in planning and forming the expedition was minimal.

=== Goals ===
The Vasilyev–Shishmaryov and Bellingshausen–Lazarev expeditions were respectively the third and fourth Russian circumnavigations to be organized and financed by the state. Both squads met in Portsmouth with the sloop Kamchatka, which was returning to St. Petersburg from the second circumnavigation under the command of Vasily Golovnin. Vasilyev's squad crossed the equator five days earlier than Bellingshausen.

Bulkeley later refuted the theory that the expedition was entirely scientific. According to him, differences between the aims of the Navy and the Merchant fleet were blurred. He claimed that Krusenstern's expedition carried commercial cargoes and specialists of the Russian American Company, even during the First Russian circumnavigation. Out of 23 circumnavigations that were carried out during the rule of Alexander I, half were commercial.

Bulkeley suggested that Russian circumnavigations significantly influenced Alaska development and the politics of isolationism in Haijin and Sakoku. The Mulovsky expedition that was initially planned under the rule of Catherine the Great was a reaction to the first voyage of James Cook in the northern part of the Pacific. Military-political goals determined the equipment of the Vasilyev and Bellingshausen expeditions. After the Congress of Vienna, Russian–British relations significantly worsened. Thus, Sir John Barrow expressed concern in 1817 that Russia would be the first country to open the Northwest Passage.

In 1818, there were rumors that Barrow planned a double expedition with four ships to reach the pole from both the Bering and the Davis Strait. When Alexander I heard about Barrow's plans, he ordered the sloops urgently outfitted and sent. However, counter admiral Lev Mitin noted that Bellingshausen's expedition was explicitly scientific and did not imply the goals of territorial expansion. According to Bulkeley, the lack of political aims in the expedition program does not signify anything since neither the Admiralty instructions for the 1818–1819 British Arctic expedition of Frederick William Beechey, William Parry, and John Ross, nor Franklin's lost expedition of 1845–1848, had any written political aims. Thus, Bulkeley claimed that without any political aims, the expedition would be much less effective.

The following passage in Bellingshausen's description was very remarkable:

In case of gaining islands and yet unknown costs, and also in commemoration of our stay in different places, it was allowed to leave and to give medals – silver for important people, and bronze – for others. These medals were minted in the Saint Petersburg Mint; on the one side it was Alexander I, and on the other was the inscription: sloops ‘Vostok’ and ‘Mirny’ in 1819, the same time when they were sent.

The Ministry of Sea Forces published the instruction that was signed by the Emperor on May 22 [O.S. May 10]. The most important points were:

- The sloops were to go through England and the Canary Islands before continuing on to Brazil;
- Heading to South Georgia Island, the expedition was to round the South Georgia and the South Sandwich Islands from the eastern side and advance as far south as possible;
- The expedition was then to "use all possible efforts and the greatest effort to achieve as close to the Pole as possible, to look for unknown lands, and not leave this enterprise otherwise than with insurmountable obstacles";
- After the end of the first Arctic summer, the expedition would reach Port Jackson (Sydney);
- From Australia, the expedition would sail to Pacific waters, explore the islands that Kotzebue was researching, and "conduct observations about other neighbors, of which the inhabitants of the first-mentioned";
- After a second visit to Australia, "head south again to distant latitudes; resume and ... continue their research on last year's example with the same determination and perseverance, and the other meridians will sail to make the way around the globe, turning to the very height from which the division set off";
- Finally, after successfully completing the task, the expedition was to return to Russia.

The Emperor also commands that in all the lands which they will approach, and in which the inhabitants live, to treat them [locals] with the greatest affection and humanity, avoiding as much as possible all cases of causing offenses or displeasure, but on the contrary, trying to attract them with caress, and never apply too strict measures, unless in necessary cases, when the salvation of the people entrusted to his superiors will depend on this.

=== Equipment and staff ===
==== Commanders and crew ====
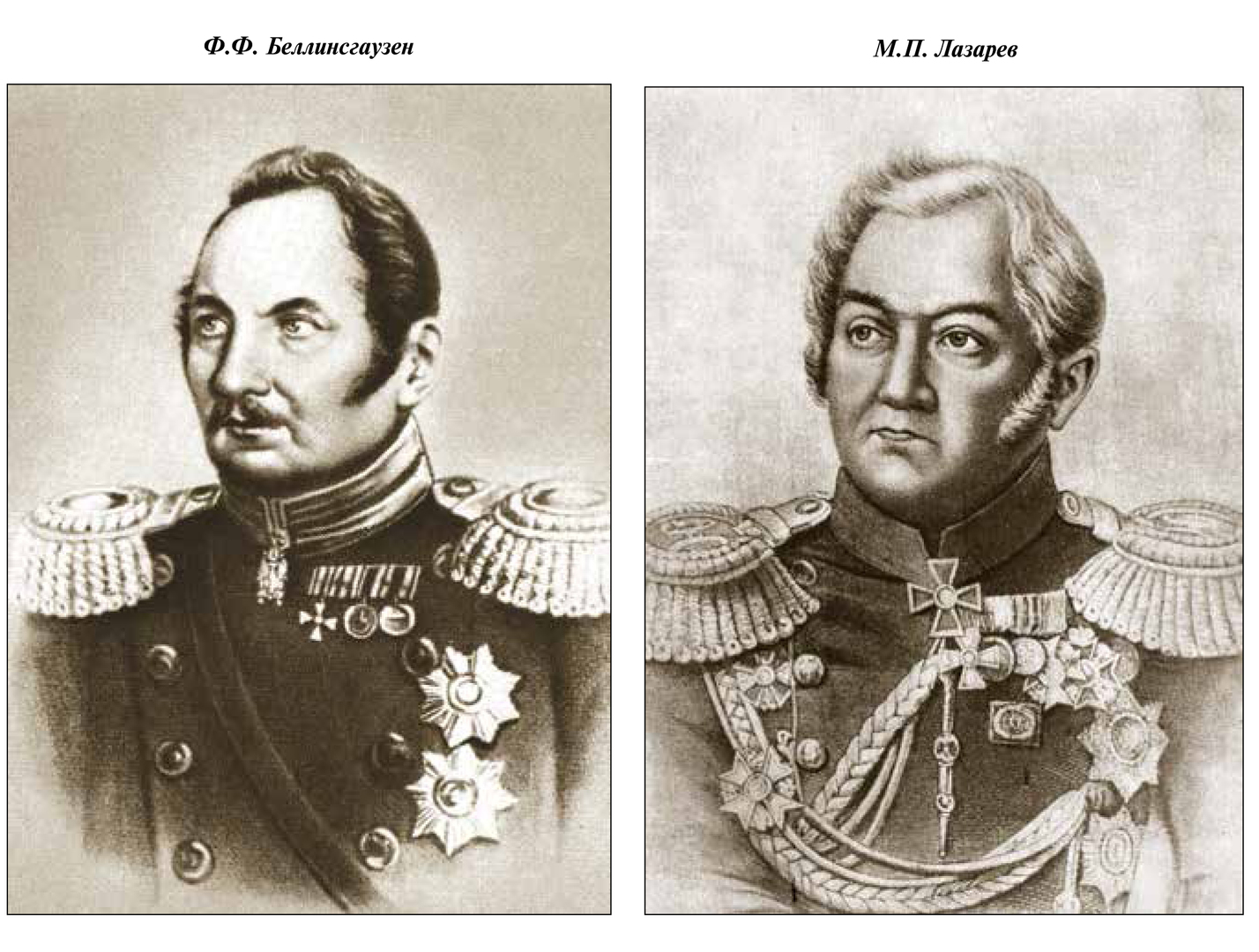
Expedition commanders Fabian Bellingshausen (left) and Mikhail Lazarev (right)

Judging by the available archival documents, appointing a commander was a very complicated process. Traversay constantly delayed his decision on the matter. On March 27 [O.S. March 15], orders of appointment of Shishmaryov and Lazarev were released. Lazarev was given command of the sloop Mirny. Lazarev's brother Alexei Lazarev served as a lieutenant on Blagonamerennyi. Finally, on May 4 [O.S. April 22], Vasilyev was appointed as commander of the second division. Initially, Traversay wanted to appoint Makar Ratmanov as head of the Southern (first) division. According to the order dated the beginning of May (which is stored at the Russian State Archive of the Navy), Ratmanov was supposed to head the Northern (second) division, but his name was later crossed out. Krusenstern claimed that Bellingshausen's appointment was entirely based on merit. However, Bellingshausen stated that he owed his place to Ratmanov's recommendation.

At that time, Bellingshausen was serving as a Captain of the 2nd rank and commander of the frigate Flora in Sevastopol. His order of appointment was released on May 4. He arrived in Saint Petersburg on May 23, presumably alone, on a tarantass. On June 16, he received instructions and took the sloop under his command. In addition to funds issued by the treasury for travel on mail horses and the railway, he also received a bonus of 1,000 rubles. After his appointment, Bellingshausen received the ship's treasury of 10,000 silver rubles for unforeseen expenses.

The expedition officers and crew were recruited as volunteers. However, there were strict selection criteria: perfect health, age not exceeding 35 years, knowledge beyond any specialty or shipboard skill, and, finally, the ability to shoot rifles well. There were six officers on board Vostok, including Ivan Zavadovsky, Arkady Leskov, Konstantin Torson, physician Jacob Berg, astronomer Ivan Mikhailovich Simonov, and painter Pavel Mikhailov. The expedition also included 36 non-commissioned officers, artillerymen and artisans (including 4 officers' batmen), and 71 sailors from the first and second article. The Murny was staffed by five officers, including Mikhail Annenkov, Ivan Kupreyanov, physician Galkin, and hieromonk Dionysius, hired at the insistence of the Minister of the Sea Forces, as well as 22 non-commissioned officers, artillerymen, a servant, and 45 first and second article sailors.

The crew received a generous bonus – even before going to the sea, Bellingshausen received 5,000 rubles from the Emperor, Lazarev received 3,000, and all officers and privates were awarded an annual salary that "did not count". The Emperor ordered the salary increased by eight times, even though the standard salary of the sailor of the first article was 13 rubles 11 kopecks per year. However, Bellingshausen never mentioned concrete sums in his reports. Michman Novosilsky claimed that an increased salary was paid only two times, in silver; the other amounts were paid in assignation rubles that increased allowance by 250%. Besides that, officers and scientists received 30 golden Dutch chervonets Russian coinage food installments per month, which was equal to 70 silver rubles.

==== Members ====
List of all First Russian Antarctic Expedition members:

Crew of Vostok

- Expedition leader and commander of Vostok: second class captain Fabian Gottlieb von Bellingshausen (Russian: Фадде́й Фадде́евич Беллинсга́узен)
- Lieutenant commander Ivan Zavadovsky
- Lieutenants: Ivan Ignatiev (Иван Игнатьев), Konstantin Torson, Arkady Leskov
- Midshipman Dmitry Demidov (Дмитрий Демидов)
- Astronomer professor Ivan Mikhailovich Simonov (Иван Михайлович Симонов)
- Artist Pavel Mihailov (Павел Михайлов)
- Staff-doctor (Russian: штаб-лекарь) Yakov Berh (Яков Берх)
- Navigator Yakov Poryadin (Яков Порядин)
- Clerk at officer rank (Russian: клерк офицерского чина) Ivan Rezanov (Резанов)
- Reefer Roman Adame (Роман Адаме)
- Сelibate priest (Russian: иеромонах) Dionisiy (Дионисий) [last name unknown]
- Non-commissioned officers: sub-navigators Andrey Sherkunov (Андрей Шеркунов) and Peter Kryukov (Пётр Крюков), skipper's assistant Fedor Vasiliev (Фёдор Васильев), first class doctor's assistant Ivan Stepanov (Иван Степанов)
- Quartermasters: Sandash Aneev (Сандаш Анеев), Alexey Aldygin (Алексей Алдыгин), Martyn Stepanov (Мартын Степанов), Alexey Stepanov (Алексей Степанов), fluterer (флейщик) Grigory Dianov (Григорий Дианов), drummer Leonty Churkin (Леонтий Чуркин)
- First class sailors (Russian: матросы первой статьи): steersman Semen Trofimov (Семён Трофимов); topsailmen (Russian: марсовые) Gubey Abdulov (Губей Абдулов), Stepan Sazanov (Степан Сазанов), Peter Maximov (Пётр Максимов), Kondraty Petrov (Кондратий Петров), Olav Rangopl (Олав Рангопль), Paul Jacobson (Пауль Якобсон), Leon Dubovsky (Леон Дубовский), Semen Gelyaev (Семён Гуляев), Grigory Ananin (Григорий Ананьин), Grigory Elsukov (Григорий Елсуков), Stepan Philippov (Степан Филиппов), Sidor Lukin (Сидор Лукин), Matvey Handukov (Матвей Хандуков), Kondraty Borisov (Кондратий Борисов), Eremey Andreev (Еремей Андреев), Danila Kornev (Данила Корнев), Sidor Vasiliev (Сидор Васильев), Danila Lemantov (Данила Лемантов), Fedor Efimov (Фёдор Ефимов), Christian Lenbenkin (Христиан Ленбекин), Efim Gladky (Ефим Гладкий), Martyn Lyubin (Мартын Любин), Gavrila Galkin (Гаврила Галкин), Yusup Yusupov (Юсуп Юсупов), Gabit Nemyasov (Габит Немясов), Prokofy Kasatkin (Прокофий Касаткин), Ivan Krivov (Иван Кривов), Matvey Lezov (Матвей Лезов), Mafusail May-Izbay (Мафусаил Май-Избай), Nikifor Agloblin (Никифор Аглоблин), Nikita Alunin (Никита Алунин), Egor Kiselev (Егор Киселев), Ivan Saltykov (Иван Салтыков), Ivan Sholohov (Иван Шолохов), Demid Antonov (Демид Антонов), Abrosim Skukka (Абросим Скукка), Fedor Kudryahin (Фёдор Кудряхин), Ivan Yarengin (Иван Яренгин), Zahar Popov (Захар Попов), Filimon Bykov (Филимон Быков), Vasily Kuznetsov (Василий Кузнецов), Alexey Konevalov (Алексей Коневалов), Semen Gur'yanov (Семён Гурьянов), Ivan Paklin (Иван Паклин), Ivan Grebennikov (Иван Гребенников), Yakov Bizanov (Яков Бизанов), Mihail Tochilov (Михаил Точилов), Matvey Popov (Матвей Попов), Elizar Maximov (Елизар Максимов), Peter Ivanov (Пётр Иванов), Grigory Vasiliev (Григорий Васильев), Mihail Tahashikov (Михаил Тахашиков), Peter Palitsin (Пётр Палицин), Denis Yuzhakov (Денис Южаков), Vasily Sobolev (Василий Соболев), Semen Hmelnikov (Семен Хмельников), Matvey Rozhin (Матвей Рожин), Sevast'yan Chigasov (Севастьян Чигасов), Danila Stepanov (Данила Степанов), Varfolomey Kopylov (Варфоломей Копылов), Spiridon Efremov (Спиридон Ефремов), Terenty Ivanov (Терентий Иванов), Larion Nechaev (Ларион Нечаев), Fedot Razgulyaev (Федот Разгуляев), Vasily Andreev (Василий Андреев), Kirill Sapozhnikov (Кирилл Сапожников), Alexander Bareshkov (Александр Барешков), Alexey Shilovsky (Алексей Шиловский), Afanasy Kirillov (Афанасий Кириллов).
- Workmen: metalworker Matvey Gubim (Матвей Губим), timmerman (senior carpenter) Vasily Krasnopevov (Василий Краснопевов), blacksmith Peter Kurlygin (Пётр Курлыгин), carpenter Peter Matveev (Пётр Матвеев), caulker Rodion Averkiev (Родион Аверкиев), sail worker Danila Migalkin (Данила Мигалкин), cooper Gavrila Danilov (Гаврила Данилов).
- Gunners: non-commissioned artillery officers Ilya Petuhov (Илья Петухов) and Ivan Kornil'ev (Иван Корнильев), bombardier Leonty Markelov (Леонтий Маркелов), first class gunners Zahar Krasnitsyn (Захар Красницын), Yan Yatsylevich (Ян Яцылевич), Yakub Belevich (Якуб Белевич), Egor Vasiliev (Егор Васильев), Vasily Kapkin (Василий Капкин), Feklist Alexeev (Феклист Алексеев), Semen Gusarov (Семён Гусаров), Stepan Yatsynovsky (Степан Яцыновский), Nikita Lebedev (Никита Лебедев), Gleb Plysov (Глеб Плысов) and Ivan Barabanov (Иван Барабанов).

Crew of Mirny

- Lieutenants: Mikhail Lazarev (commander of Mirny), Nikolay Obernibesov (Николай Обернибесов), Mikhail Annenkov (Михаил Анненков).
- Midshipmen: Ivan Kupriyanov (Иван Куприянов), Pavel Novosilsky (Павел Новосильский)
- Navigator at officer's rank (Russian: штурман офицерского чина): Nikolay Ilyin (Николай Ильин)
- Surgeon: Nikolay Galkin (Николай Галкин)
- Boatswains and non-commissioned officers: botswain Ivan Losyakov (Иван Лосяков), battler at sergeant's rank (Russian: баталер сержантского ранга Andrey Davydov (Андрей Давыдов), first class medical assistant Vasily Ponomarev (Василий Пономарев), metalworker Vasiliy Gerasimov (Василий Герасимов), skipper's assistant Vasily Trifanov (Василий Трифанов), navigator's assistant Yakov Harlav (Яков Харлав).
- Quartermasters: Vasily Alexeev (Василий Алексеев), Nazar Rahmatulov (Назар Рахматулов), drummer Ivan Novinsky (Иван Новинский).
- First class sailors: Abashir Yakshin (Абашир Якшин), Platon Semenov (Платон Семенов), Arsenty Philippov (Арсентий Филиппов), Spiridon Rodionov (Спиридон Родионов), Nazar Atalinov (Назар Аталинов), Egor Bernikov (Егор Берников), Gabidulla Mamlineev (Габидулла Мамлинеев), Grigory Tyukov (Григорий Тюков), Pavel Mohov (Павел Мохов), Peter Ershev (Пётр Ершев), Fedor Pavlov (Фёдор Павлов), Ivan Kirillov (Иван Кириллов), Matvey Murzin (Матвей Мурзин), Simon Taus (Симон Таус), Ivan Antonov (Иван Антонов), Demid Ulyshev (Демид Улышев), Vasily Sidorov (Василий Сидоров), Batarsha Badeev (Батарша Бадеев), Lavrenty Chupranov (Лаврентий Чупранов), Egor Barsukov (Егор Барсуков), Yakov Kirillov (Яков Кириллов), Osip Koltakov (Осип Колтаков), Markel Estigneev (Маркел Естигнеев), Adam Kuh (Адам Кух), Nikolay Volkov (Николай Волков), Grigory Petunin (Григорий Петунин), Ivan Leont'ev (Иван Леонтьев), Anisim Gavrilov (Анисим Гаврилов), Larion Philippov (Ларион Филиппов), Tomas Bunganin (Томас Бунганин), Danila Anohin (Данила Анохин), Fedor Bartyukov (Фёдор Бартюков), Ivan Kozminsky (Иван Козьминский), Frol Shavyrin (Фрол Шавырин), Arhip Palmin (Архип Палмин), Zahar Ivanov (Захар Иванов), Vasily Kurchaviy (Василий Курчавый), Philipp Pashkov (Филипп Пашков), Fedor Istomin (Фёдор Истомин), Demid Chirkov (Демид Чирков), Dmitry Gorev (Дмитрий Горев), Il'ya Zashanov (Илья Зашанов), Ivan Kozyrev (Иван Козырев), Vasily Semenov (Василий Семенов).
- Workmen: metalworker Vasily Gerasimov (Василий Герасимов), carpenters Fedor Petrov (Фёдор Петров) and Peter Fedorov (Пётр Федоров), caulker Andrey Ermolaev (Андрей Ермолаев), sail worker Alexander Temnikov (Александр Темников), cooper Potap Sorokin (Потап Сорокин).
- Gunners: non-commissioned senior artillery officer (Russian: артиллерии старший унтер-офицер) Dmitry Stepanov; first class gunners Peter Afanasev (Пётр Афанасьев), Mikhail Rezvy (Михаил Резвый), Vasily Stepanov (Василий Степанов), Vasily Kuklin (Василий Куклин), Efim Vorob'yov (Ефим Воробьёв), Ivan Sarapov (Иван Сарапов).

==== Expedition vessels ====
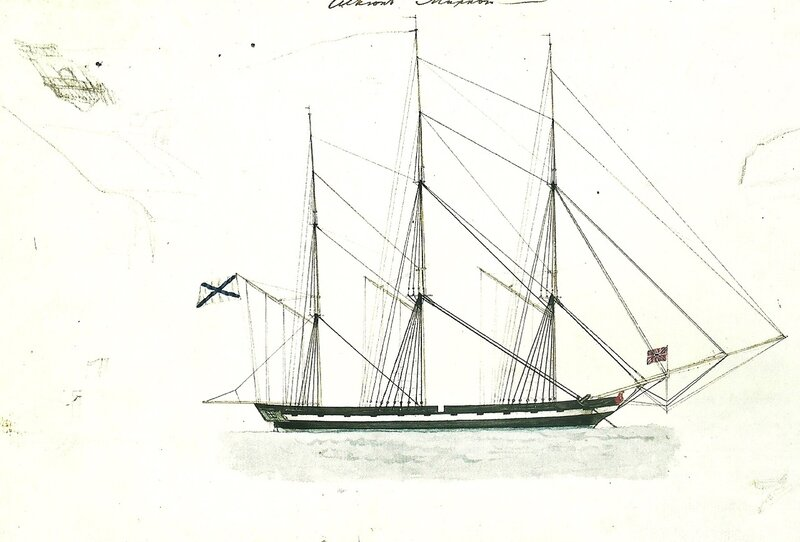
Sloop Mirny, from the album of P. Mikhailov

Two sloops were equipped for the expedition, Mirny and Vostok. There is not much available data on these vessels. In 1973, S. Luchinninov created abstract designs of both ships, based on surviving drawings from the 19th century. Vostok was built by shipbuilder Ivan Amosov, who worked at Petrozavod in 1818 under the command of Veniamin Stokke. According to Bellingshausen, Vostok was an exact copy of the sloop Kamchatka, the prototype of which, in turn, was a 32-gun frigate designed by French engineer Jacques Balthazar Brun de Sainte‑Catherine. Vostok was launched on July 16, 1818, and had a displacement of 900 tons, a length of 129 feet 10 inches (39.57 m), and a width of 32 feet 8 inches (9.96 m). At the same time, the sloop had an excessively large mast: the mainmast from the keel was 136 feet (41 m) high.

The second vessel, Mirny, was of the same type as Blagonamerennyi of the second division, and was created in Kronstadt as a sea freight ship named Ladoga. After renaming, the vessel was modernized for the needs of the expedition. Its length reached 120 feet (37 m) and its width 30 feet (9.1 m). The ship had a displacement of 530 tons; it more looked like a vessel from Cook's expedition. Each sloop carried four or five open boats of various sizes, from a four-row boat to six or eight-row boats.

The Vostok was equipped with sixteen 18-pound guns installed on the battery deck and other twelve 12-pound carronades on the Spardek. In those days, it was believed that carronades were more effective for clashes with pirates or native canoes. Mirny had six carronades and 14 three-pound guns. While anchored in Britain, the gun deck of the battery deck was shut down. Most of the crew were accommodated for the night in tethered hammocks on the battery deck, while officer cabins and the crew company were located at the stern of the ship.

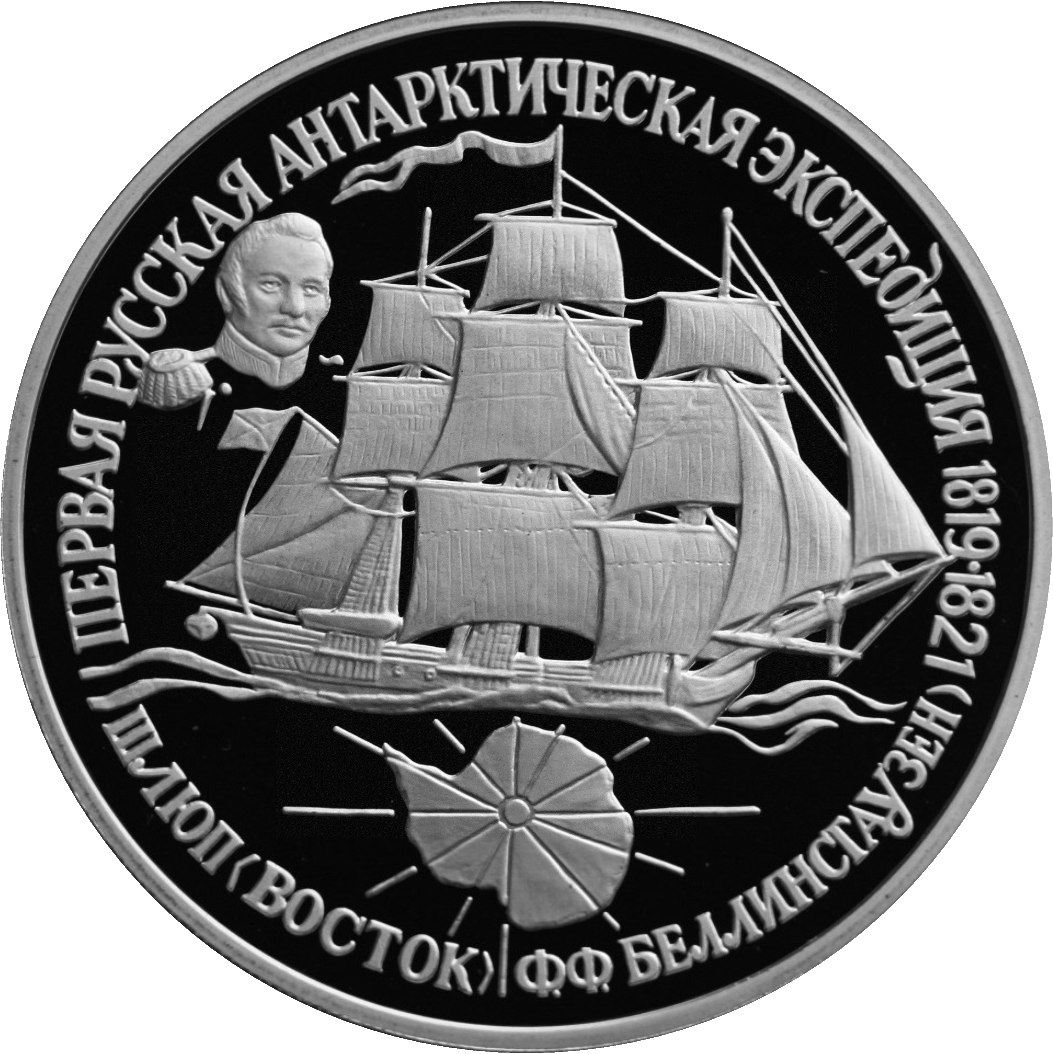
‘Vostok’

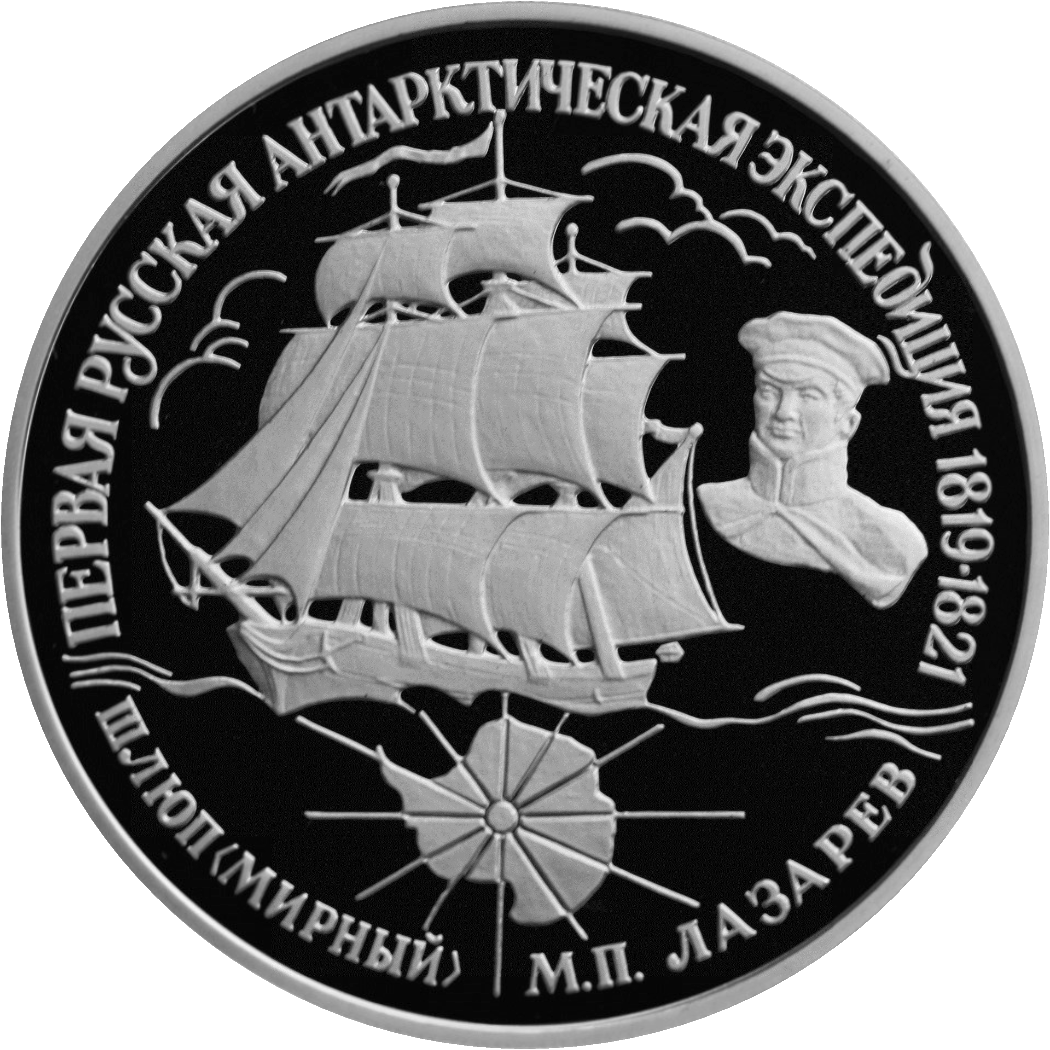
‘Mirny’

‘Vostok’ and ‘Mirny’ pictured on coins issued by Bank of Russia at 1994

One of the main aims of Bellingshausen was to make sure that the sloops remained together during the expedition. The seafaring quality of the vessels was different, and Lazarev thought that Vostok was a ship which is "obviously not ready for such expedition due to its small capacity and a small amount of space as for officers, as for the crew". Bellingshausen claimed that Traversay chose Vostok only because Kamchatka had already completed a circumnavigation, even though its captain Golovnin reported on the unsatisfactory qualities of the ship. Besides the excessive height of the mast, the Vostok had an unsuccessful steering device, an insufficiently strong hull built of raw wood, coam hatches of low height on the upper deck, and other issues.

Just before sailing, the underwater part of Vostok was lined with copper sheets. Its hull turned out to be too weak for sailing in polar waters, and the crew constantly had to strengthen and repair it during the expedition. By the end of the voyage, the sloop was in such bad condition that Bellingshausen had to finish the expedition one month earlier than intended. Lazarev was responsible for equipping the sloops because Bellingshausen was appointed only 42 days before the departure. He chose for himself the ship Mirny, presumably built by shipbuilder Yakov Kolodkin in Lodeynoye Pole and designed by Ivan Kurepanov. Lazarev was able to equip the underwater part of the ship with a second (ice) covering, to replace the pine wheel with an oak one, and to strengthen the hull further. The only drawback of the ship was its low speed.

==== Supplies and living conditions ====
Bellingshausen decided to take on board supplies for two years, even though military vessels usually only contained stocks for six months. According to the official reports, there were four tons of dried peas, seven tons of oats and buckwheat, 28 tons of corned beef, 65.8 tons of crackers (grained and pickled), a lot of sauerkraut (the report only provides the volume of the barrels), and 3,926 liters of vodka. Although it was initially planned to use a "dry broth" or soup concentrate, this was not possible because the concentrate did not dry out after the boiling. Bellingshausen named suppliers of dried bread, meat, and cabbage individually because of the high quality of their provisions. The number of provisions was not enough, and the crews had to buy an additional 16 tons of grain and rum in Rio de Janeiro. The expedition also replenished its stocks in Denmark and Australia. They also bought 1.3 kilograms of tobacco per person, which corresponds to 1.5 modern cigarettes per day. Tobacco was replenished in Rio at the beginning and end of the expedition. There is no detailed description of the provisions for Vostok and Mirny, but records exist for the Blagonamerennyi and Otkrytie. Most likely the provisions were identical for both divisions.

According to Bulkeley, standard provisions in the British Royal Navy exceeded the Russian ones; however, in practice provisions were often reduced as much as possible. In 1823, the Royal Navy halved its provision amounts. Since Russian ships spent a lot of time in harbors, their commanders always bought fresh food. This practice was extensively documented in the official expedition reports. In Copenhagen in July 1819, Bellingshausen increased the meat ration to one inch of beef per day and one glass of beer per person, to improve military morale and physical abilities. To prevent a scurvy outbreak, they brought malt broth, coniferous essence, lemons, mustard, and molasses. There were only 196 kilograms of sugar on board, and it was served on big holidays, such as Christmas or the Emperor's Name day. The regular daily crew drink was tea, with stocks refreshed in London and in Rio.

Ordinary members of the crew were supplied from the treasury. According to the inventory, every man received: a mattress, a pillow, a cloth blanket, and four sheets; four uniforms, two pairs of shirts and six pairs of linen pants, four sets of waterproof clothing (pants and jacket), overcoat, one fur hat and two caps, one nautical hat, three pairs of boots (one with flannel lining), eight pairs of woolen socks, and 11 linen and seven flannel sets of linen. Overall it cost 138,134 rubles to outfit the 298 crew members. Costs were shared equally between the Admiralty department and the Ministry of Finance. Bellingshausen cared about the health of the crew, and always bought fresh products in every port. The team washed regularly, and they tried to keep people on the upper deck until sunset, to ventilate and dry the crowded battery decks. Bellingshausen prohibited physical punishments onboard Vostok, but there is no evidence whether the same was true for Mirny.

=== Scientific equipment ===
==== Equipment and instructions ====
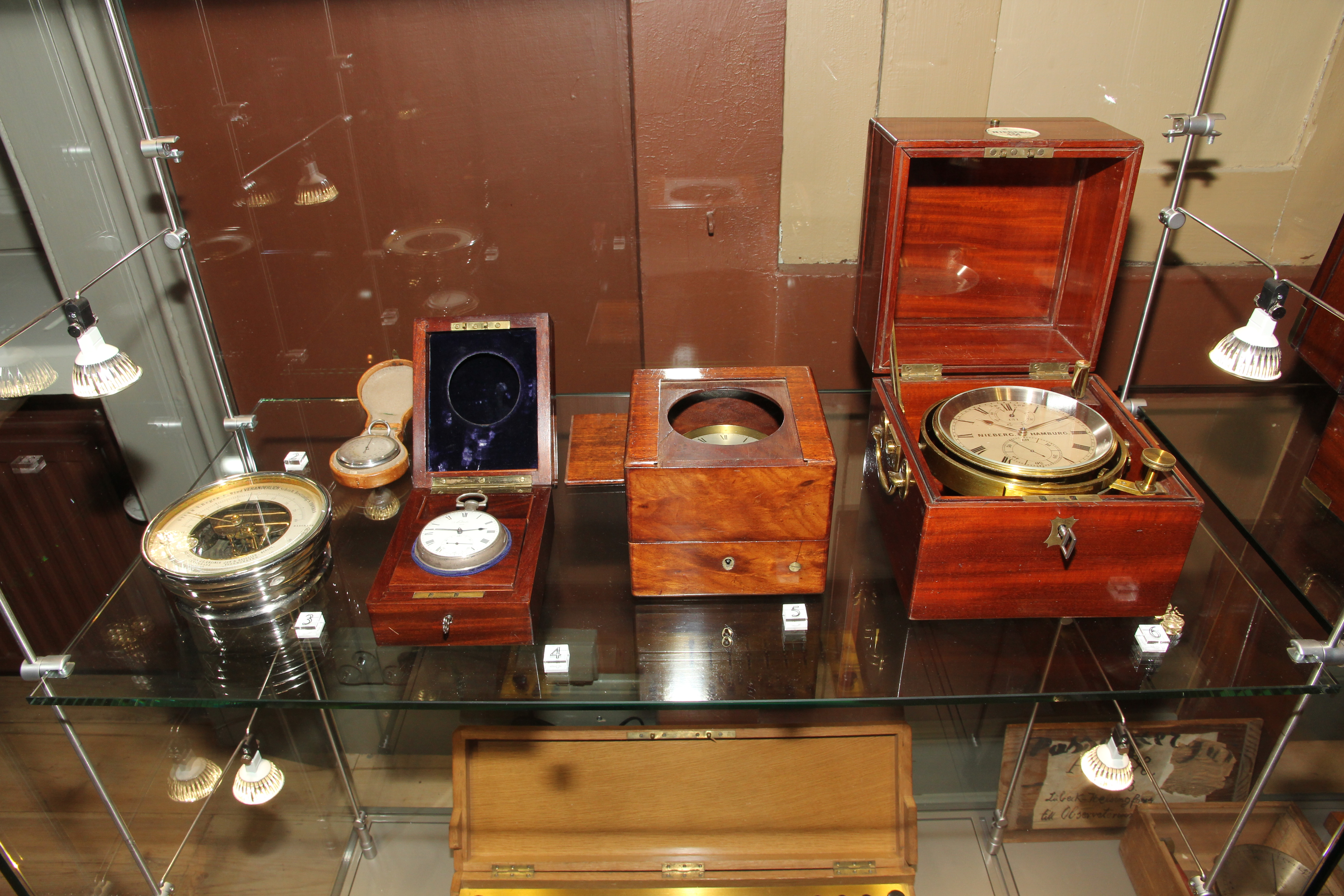
Marine chronometer and Aneroid from the collection of Helsinki University Observatory. No. 4 is the chronometer that belonged to John Arnold, 1807

The Admiralty department made a list of all required books and instruments which were needed for the Bellingshausen and Vasiliev divisions. The ships’ libraries included Russian descriptions of the expeditions conducted by Sarychev, Krusenstern, Lisyansky, Golovnin. The French description of Cook's third voyage was also stored in the library since its first edition was absent from the Ministry of Sea Forces. The majority of descriptions of foreign voyages, including the one conducted by George Anson, were available in French translations. The crews also acquired Nautical almanacs for 1819 and 1820, guides on navigation, hydrography and magnetism, as well as signal books (Note: Books that gives instructions on accepting any signals). Money was also allotted to buy books in London, including the almanac for 1821, and maps from newly conducted voyages (including Brazilian ones). Bellingshausen also bought a world atlas that was released in 1817, and Matthew Flinders’ 1814 atlas of Australia. During their stay in Copenhagen, he also bought a book on magnetism by Christopher Hansteen (1819). Based on this work, the crew carried out a search for the South Magnetic Pole.

Astronomic and navigation instruments were ordered in advance, but not everything had been delivered when Bellingshausen, Simonov, and Lazarev traveled to London in August 1819. Bellingshausen mentioned buying instruments by Aaron Arrowsmith. It was decided to go beyond the budget boundaries, so the crews also bought two chronometers by inventor John Arnold (№ 518 and 2110), and two – by Paul Philipp Barraud (№ 920 and 922), three- and four-foot refractors with achromatic lenses, a 12-inch reflecting telescope, and for Simonov – a transit instrument and an attitude indicator. Repeating circles by Edward Troughton proved to be inconvenient for use at sea. For ‘Vostok’ they bought sextants by Troughton and Peter Dollond; officers bought some of the instruments with their own money. Thermometers were designed with the Réaumur scale used in Russia, but Simonov also used the Fahrenheit temperature scale. Bellingshausen also mentioned an inclinometer, which he used onshore. The captain bought a deep-sea thermometer. However, he could not get a Pendulum instrument for gravimetry research.

==== Problems with a naturalist ====
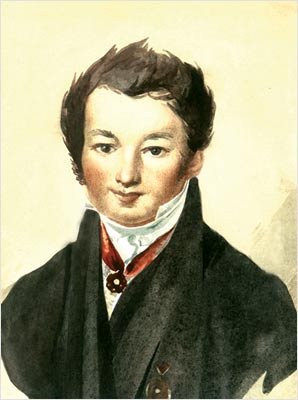
Professor Semyonov, who served as an astronomer during the expedition. Unknown painter, 1822

The functions of naturalist in circumnavigations usually spread over on all fields of knowledge which did not require the mathematical calculations made by astronomers or officers-navigators. The duties of expedition naturalist included not only the description of all new species of animals and plants, but also of cultures of primitive peoples, geology, and glaciological formations. Instructions by the Admiralty department mentioned two German scientists that were recognized as suitable candidates: medic Karl Heinrich Mertens, a recent graduate of the Martin Luther University of Halle-Wittenberg, and doctor Gustav Kunze of Leipzig University. These scientists were to arrive in Copenhagen by June 24, 1819. Martens was to join Bellingshausen's division, and Kunze would be assigned to Vasiliev. However, when the divisions arrived in Copenhagen on July 15, it turned out that both scientists had refused to participate because of the short time "to prepare everything needed".

The instruments and guides the expeditions brought were of varying quality. Bellingshausen noted that after the death of astronomer Nevil Maskelyne, the maritime almanac lost precision, finding no less than 108 errors in the 1819 volume. The chronometers recommended by Joseph Banks, who promoted the interests of John Arnold's family, were unsuitable. The same firm set up for James Cook "very bad chronometers" that were ahead by 101 seconds per day. Bulkeley called the quality of chronometers on Vostok "horrifying". By May 1820 the chronometers on Mirny were ahead by 5–6 minutes per day. In 1819, William Parry spent five weeks reconciling his chronometers in the Greenwich Royal Observatory, while Simonov dedicated no less than 40% of his observation time on the calibration of chronometers and establishing correct time. The deep-sea thermometer broke during its second use. However, Bellingshausen claimed that it was a fault of the staff. These issues led to no small confusion, not only on the expedition vessels but also in St. Petersburg. There is available correspondence between Traversay and the Minister of National Education, Count Alexander Nikolaevich Golitsyn, judging from which one can conclude that scientific team on Vostok should include naturalist Martens, astronomer Simonov, and painter Mikhailov.

The reasons why the German scientists did not join the expedition have been widely debated by historians. The late invitation may have been dictated by the conditions of secrecy in which the expedition was equipped. According to archival data, decisions regarding German scientists were taken four weeks before the deadline for their arrival, and a formal order was released only on July 10, 1819, when the expedition was already in the Baltic Sea. Also, Kunze defended his doctoral dissertation on June 22, 1819, and it is unlikely that he would agree and be able to be present in Copenhagen two days after that. In his preface to the publication of the expedition report, Yevgeny Sсhvede wrote that scientists "were afraid of the upcoming difficulties". Bulkeley mentioned that the main problem was the unpredictability of the Russian naval bureaucracy.

The main aims of the Bellingshausen expedition were to perform geographical research. Since Simonov was the only professional scientist on board, he also had to collect plant and animal samples in addition to his primary duties. As a result, Simonov passed along the collection activities and taxidermy to Berg and Galkin, the expedition medics. Simonov was not always good at what he was trying to do. For instance, on October 5, 1819, Simonov got a severe burn while trying to catch a Portuguese man o' war, even though Bellingshausen warned him.

According to Bulkeley, gravimetric and oceanographic observations were conducted more by Bellingshausen than by Simonov. For the captain, magnetic measurements were necessary as a significant aspect of navigation and geographical observations, and not for purely scientific purposes. For Simonov, journalistic and historiographic reasons may have been of equal importance. His travel journals became the first publications on the expedition, and a series on magnetic measurements were published much later. Approximately half of the measurement material was included in the article on magnetism.

== Expedition ==
All dates are provided according to the Julian calendar, the difference with the Gregorian calendar in the 19th century constituted 12 days

=== Sailing in the Atlantic (July – November 1819) ===
==== Kronstadt, Copenhagen, Portsmouth ====
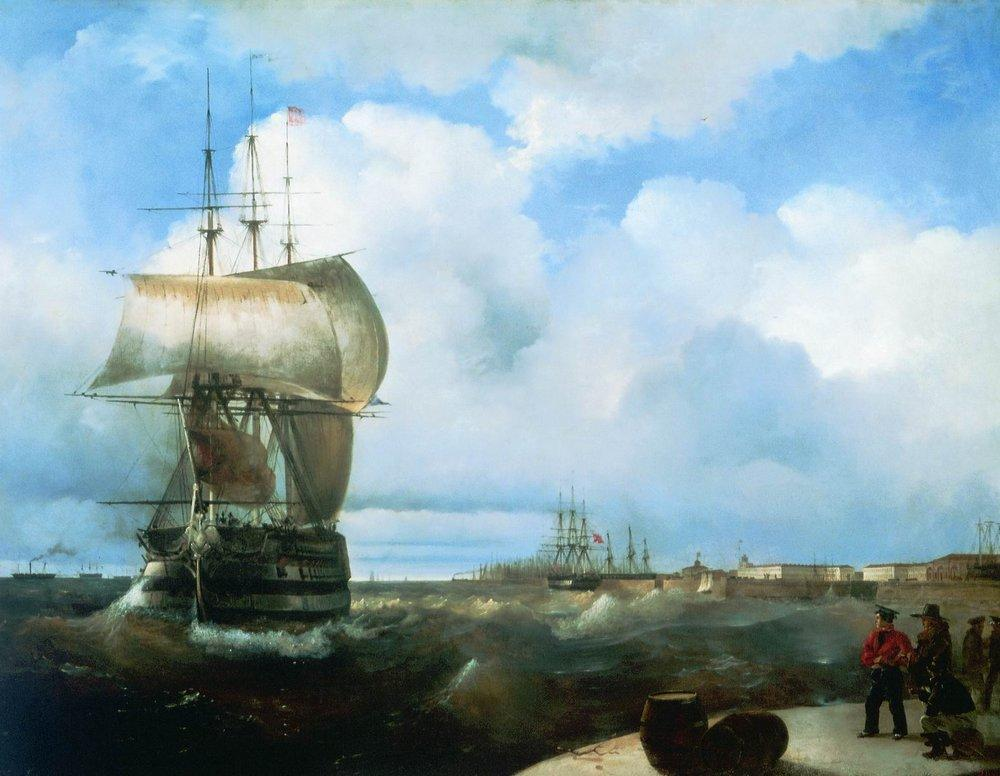
Big raid in Kronstadt, 1836. By Ivan Aivazovsky, stored at the Russian Museum.

On June 23 and 24, 1819, the Emperor and the Minister of Sea Forces visited the sloops Vostok, Mirny, Otkrytie and Blagonamerennyi as they were being equipped. On this occasion, workers stopped retrofitting work until the officials departed. On June 25, captains Bellingshausen and Vasiliev were called for an imperial audience in Peterhof.

The departure took place on July 4 at 6 pm, and was accompanied by a ceremony during which the crews shouted a fivefold "cheers" and saluted to the Kronstadt Fortress. Four ships sailed as a single squad until Rio. By July 19, the expedition had spent a week in Copenhagen, where the crew received additional instructions and found out that the German naturalists were not going to participate in the voyage. The head of the Royal Danish Nautical Charts Archive, admiral Poul de Løvenørn, supplied the expedition with necessary maps and advised them to buy a desalination machine. On July 26 the expedition arrived in Deal, and on July 29 reached Spithead in Portsmouth. The sloop Kamchatka under the command of Golovin was already there, finishing its circumnavigation.

On August 1, Bellingshausen, Lazarev, officers, and Simonov hired a stagecoach and went to London, where they spent 9 days. The main aim was to receive ordered books, maps, and instruments. As a result, not everything was acquired, and some items came only with the assistance of consul Andrei Dubachevskyi. The restructuring of Mirnyi and the purchase of canned vegetables and beer delayed the expedition in Portsmouth until August 25. On August 20, the transport Kutuzov of the Russian-American Company arrived in England. It was finishing its circumnavigation under the command of Ludwig von Hagemeister.

On August 26, the expedition went to Tenerife with the aim of stocking up on wine and fresh supplies. While being in England, three sailors from the sloop Mirny got a sexually transmitted infection. However, Dr Galkin's prognosis was favorable; there were no sick people on Vostok. In the Atlantic, a working rhythm was established on the sloops: the crews were divided into three shifts. This system allowed sailors to wake up an already rested part of the team in the event of an emergency. In rainy and stormy weather, the watch commanders were instructed to ensure that the "servants" changed clothes, and the wet clothes were stored outside the living deck and dried in the wind. On Wednesdays and Fridays, there was a bath-washing day (in these days one boiler on the caboose was used for these purposes, which allowed the use of hot water). The bunks were also washed on the 1st and 15th of each month. General deck cleaning was usually done on the move twice a week, and daily during the long stayings. The living deck was regularly ventilated and heated "to thin the air", and if the weather allowed, the crew took food on quarterdecks and forecastles, "so that decks do not leave damp fumes and impurities". On September 10, a vent pipe was put through the captain's cabin. This was to keep the constable and brotkamera dry. The constable was a room on the lower deck from the stern to the main mast – or the aft cabin on the middle deck – which contained artillery supplies, which the brotkamera was a room for keeping dry provisions, primarily flour and crackers. The vent pipe was necessary because the brotkamera leaked and the officers’ flour got wet and rotted.

==== Tenerife – Equator ====
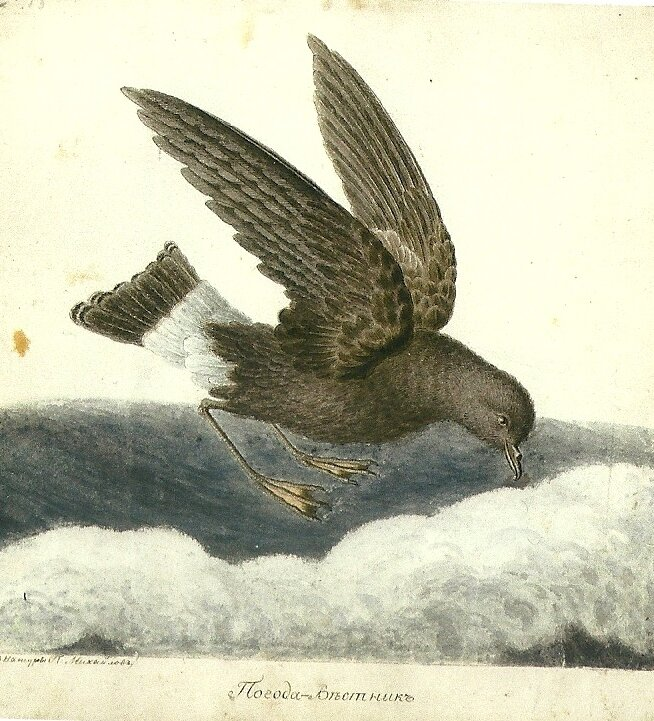
Akvarel from the Mikhailov's album

At 6 am on September 15, the vessels entered the harbor at Santa Cruz de Tenerife, where they stayed for six days. Simonov went with four officers from both sloops to the foot of the volcano Teide, explored the botanic garden with Dracaena dracos, and visited the sisters of general Agustín de Betancourt. However, the main responsibility of the astronomer was to verify the chronometers. For this purpose, he used the house of Captain Don Antonio Rodrigo Ruiz. A stock of wine was taken aboard at a price of 135 thaler for a butt.

The expedition sailed across the Atlantic at a speed of between 5.5 and 7 knots, using the northwestern trade winds. They crossed the Tropic of Cancer on September 22, fixing the air temperature at noon at 20 °Ré (25 °C). On September 25, Bellingshausen took advantage of the calm to change the topmast on Vostok in order to decrease its speed and help keep the two ships together'. During this time, Russian sailors watched for flying fish, branching pyrosomes and gushing whales.

The hot calm started on October 7. The team was exhausted by heat: in the sleeping deck, the temperature was kept at a level 22.9 °Ré (28.6 °C). According to Bellingshausen, this was the same weather as in St. Petersburg. However, the night did not bring relief, and air temperatures exceeded the temperature of the water. On October 8, the crews conducted oceanographic measures: density of seawater and its temperature to a depth of 310 fathoms. They received a result of 78 °F (26 °C). However, Bellingshausen suggested that the water of the upper layers of the ocean had been mixed in the bathometer with the collected samples, which would distort the results. They also tried to measure the constant speed of the equatorial current. For that, they used a copper boiler of 8 buckets submerged 50 fathoms and got the result of 9 miles per day. On October 12 sailors were able to see and shoot birds "Northern storm petrel" which testified to the proximity of land.

On October 18, the vessels crossed the equator at 10 am after being at sea for 29 days. Bellingshausen was the only person on board of the Vostok who had previously crossed the equator, so he arranged a line-crossing ceremony. Everyone was sprinkled with seawater, and in order to celebrate the event, everyone was given a glass of punch a, which they drank during a gun salute. Simonov compared this ceremony to a "small imitation "Maslenitsa".

==== The first visit of Brazil ====
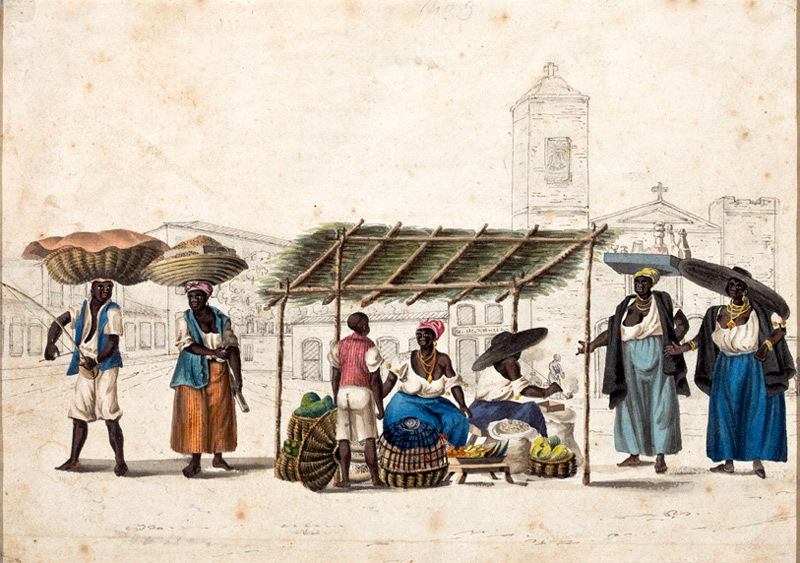
Street merchants in Rio by Henry Chamberlain, 1819–1820. Stored at the São Paulo Museum of Art.

In October, the southern trade winds decreased the heat, and clear weather only favored astronomical observations. Besides Bellingshausen, Simonov, Lazarev, and Zavadovsky, no one on the board had skills for navigation and for working with the sextant. Thus, taking into consideration the abundance of instruments on board, all officers started to study navigation. On November 2, 1819, at 5 pm, the expedition arrived in Rio following the orienteer of the Pão de Açúcar mountain, the image of which they had in the sailing directions. Since no one from the crew spoke Portuguese, there were some language barrier difficulties. By that time, Otkrytie and Blagonamerennyi were already in the harbor since they did not go to the Canary Islands. On November 3, Consul General of Russia Georg von Langsdorff who was also a participant of the first Russian circumnavigation in 1803–1806, met the crew and escorted officers to the ambassador major general baron Diederik Tuyll van Serooskerken. The next day, the consul arranged for the astronomers to use a rocky island called Rados where Simonov, guard-marine Adams and artilleryman Korniliev set a transit instrument and started to reconcile the chronometers. Generally, Bellingshausen was not fond of the Brazilian capital, mentioning "disgusting untidiness" and "abominable shops where they sell slaves". On the contrary, Simonov claimed that Rio with its "meekness of morals, the luxury and courtesy of society and the magnificence of spiritual processions" do "remind him of southern European cities". Officers visited the neighborhoods of the city, coffee plantations, and Trizhuk Falls. On November 9, commanders of both divisions – Bellingshausen, Lazarev, Vasiliev, and Shishmaryov – received the audience with the Portuguese king John VI of Portugal, who at that time resided in Brazil. Before the ships departed, their crews filled the stocks and took for slaughtering two bulls, 40 pigs and 20 piglets, several sheep, ducks and hens, rum and granulated sugar, lemons, pumpkins, onions, garlic, and other herbs. On November 20, the chronometers were put back on board. On November 22 at 6 am, the expedition headed to the south.

On November 24, onboard Vostok, lieutenant Lazarev and hieromonk Dionysius served a paraklesis to ask for successful completion of the expedition. The crew on Mirny received a salary for 20 months ahead and money for the food for officers, so "in the case of any misfortune with the sloop Vostok the officers and staff of Mirny would not be left without satisfaction". Lazarev received instructions to wait on the Falkland Islands in case the vessels became separated. At the end of the designated time, the vessel was supposed to head to Australia. The sloops were to keep at a distance of 7 to 14 miles on clear days, and 0.5 miles or closer during fog.

=== First season (December 1819 – March 1820) ===
==== Subantarctic exploration ====
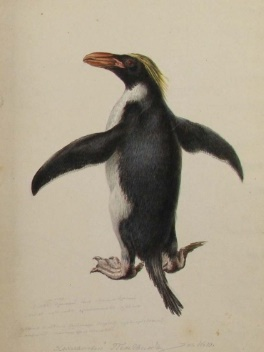
Southern rockhopper penguin, from the album of P. Mikhailov

After November 29, 1819, the weather began to deteriorate markedly. On that day, there were two squalls with rain and hail. Bellingshausen compared the December weather with Petersburg's weather "when Neva river opens, and the humidity from it brings the sea wind to the city". The ships set sail toward South Georgia Island, from which Bellingshausen wanted to enter the Southern Ocean. After the departure from Rio, watch officers began sending observers to all three masts to report on the state of the sea and the horizon every half of an hour. This procedure was maintained until the end of the expedition.

On December 10, "warmth significantly decreased", and starting from this day the hatches on the upper deck were closed. On the mainsail hatch, the crew made a 4 square foot glass window, cast-iron stoves were permanently fixed, and their pipes were led into the main- and fore-hatches (Note: Hatch before the maintop). The crew received winter uniforms consisting of flannel linen and cloth uniforms. On December 11, the crew noticed many seabirds and, particularly, southern rockhopper penguins. However, due to the birds' caution, the hunters and taxidermist could not get any sample. On December 12, temperature measurement showed the result of 3.7 °Ré (4.6 °C) at midnight, and in the living deck – 6.8 °Ré (8.5 °C).

The sloops reached the south-western shore of South Georgia on December 15, noticing the cliffs of Wallis and George at 8 am at a distance of 21 miles. Due to severe swells, the expedition rounded the island at a range of one and a half to two miles from the coast at a speed of 7 knots. Soon they were met by a sailing boat under the English flag. The English navigator mistook Russian vessels for fishing sloops. That same day, the crew of the sloops discovered Annenkov island at 54°31' south latitude. The expedition then tacked to the east.

On December 16, the expedition vessels passed Pickersgill Island, which had been discovered by James Cook. At this point, the Mirny lagged behind the Vostok because Lazarev ordered his crew to procure penguin meat and eggs on the shore. The mapping of South Georgia was finally completed on December 17, ending the work begun by James Cook 44 years before. Sailor Kiselev mentioned in his diary that watches guards who noticed new islands received a bonus of five thalers which was put into the logbook.

On December 20, the travelers observed an iceberg for the first time. During their attempt to measure the sea temperature, they got a result of 31.75 °F (−0.14 °C) on a depth of 270 fathoms. However, the deep-sea thermometer from John William Norie broke. It was noted that this was the only deep-sea thermometer that was available.

On December 22, the crew discovered Leskov Island, which was covered in ice and snow, and named it after Lieutenant Leskov, one of the participants in the expedition. The next day they discovered the mountainous and snowy Zavodovski Island, named after the captain-lieutenant, and Thorson Island, named after Lieutenant Konstantin Thorson. Three newly discovered islands were named after Traversay, the Minister of Sea Forces. On December 24, the vessels approached the iceberg to cut some ice in order to replenish freshwater stocks:

To conduct an experiment, I ordered tea prepared from the melted ice without mentioning it to the officers; everyone thought the water was excellent, and the tea tasted good. That gave us hope that while sailing between ice plates, we would always have good water.

On Christmas, thermometer readings dropped to −0.8 °Ré (−1 °C) and the vessels had to maneuver with an opposite south wind. For Christmas, a priest was brought to Vostok, and he served a rogation with kneeling on the occasion of "deliverance from Russia from the invasion of the Gauls and with them two hundred languages". Shchi was a celebratory meal ("favourite meal of Russians") that was made of fresh pork with sour cabbage (on ordinary days they were cooked from corned beef), and pies with rice and minced meat. Private men were given half a mug of beer. They also received rum punch with sugar and lemon after lunch, which significantly improved the atmosphere on board. Lazarev and the Mirny officers also participated in the festive dinner.

The next day the crew continued describing Traversay Islands. On December 27, Bellingshausen tried to measure seawater temperature with an ordinary thermometer that was put to a homemade bathometer with valves. Water taken at depth did not heat up as it rose and did not distort the readings. Salinity and water density measurements from 220 fathoms showed an increase in salinity with depth. On December 29, the expedition reached Saunders Island, which had been discovered by Cook.

==== Discovery of Antarctica ====
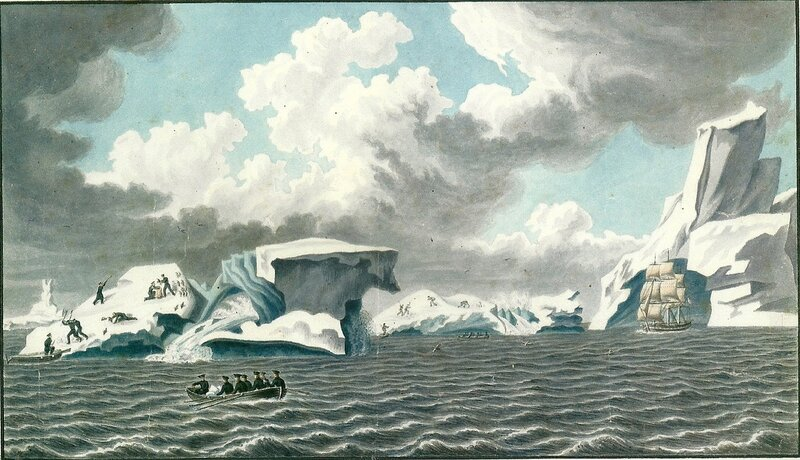
View on the ice islands, March 4, 1820, from the P. Mikhailov's album

On December 31, 1819, the expedition reached Bristol Island, and survived the heaviest squall, followed with wet snow that decreased the visibility to 50 fathoms. At 10 pm the expedition ran into an impassable ice field and changed its course. Only the topsail was to be remained, even though it was also covered in snow that the crew had to put the sloops directly under the wind and calm sails. Watch guards had to put snow out of decks constantly. Officers celebrated the new year of 1820 at 6 am. The same day Vostok lost Mirny out of sight, and cannon signals were not heard due to the direction of the winds. By noon, the ships reunited. On January 2, 1820, the expedition passed Thule Island at 59° south latitude. The name was given by James Cook in 1775 because of the abundance of ice heading more to the south did not seem possible. On January 7 the crew hunted penguins which were later cooked for both privates and the officers; more than 50 harvested carcasses were transferred to Mirny. Penguin meat was usually soaked in vinegar and added to corned beef when cooking porridge or cabbage. According to Bellingshausen, sailors willingly ate penguin meat seeing that "officers also praised the food." On January 8, the vessels reached iceberg where they caught with seine fishing around 38 penguins and cut some ice. Alive penguins were locked in a chicken coop. Besides, lieutenant Ignatieff and Demidov got the first seal on the expedition, that they found looking like ringed seal living in Arkhangelsk Governorate.

On January 9, Mirny collided with an ice field, which knocked out the four-pound ship gref. (Note: the lower part of the skimmer or the first of the wooden keel block of stem) The strength of the construction and skills of lieutenant Nikolay Obernisov minimized damage, so the leak did not open. On January 12 the expedition passed eight icebergs and crossed 61 south latitude, the weather all that time being cloudy with mixed rain and snow. On January 15 the expedition crossed the Antarctic Circle at 66° south latitude and 3° west longitude. The next day Bellingshausen described his observations as "ices that we imagined as white clouds through the coming snow" that lasted from horizon to horizon. This was the first observation of ice shelves. The observation point was 69°21'28" south latitude and 2°14'50" west longitude – the modern area of Bellingshausen's ice shelf is near Princess Martha Coast in the Lazarev Sea. On January 17, the sun appeared briefly, which made it possible to get closer to Mirny, but then the weather worsened again. On January 21, participants of the expedition observed "ice masses" for the second time, the limits of which were not visible. One hundred four days had passed from the departure from Rio, and living conditions were extreme. In the living deck and officer cabins, the stoves were heated daily (instead of heating pads, they used cannonballs heated in the fire). However, the crew still had to clean condensation three times a day, as it accumulated constantly. Due to constant wet snow and fog, the crew had difficulties with drying clothes and beds.

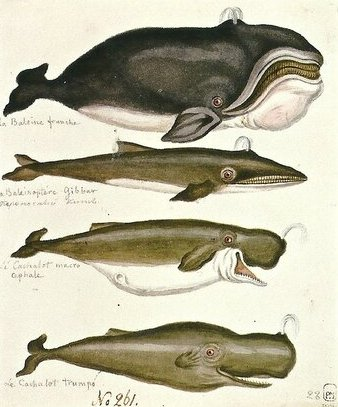
Cetaceans of the Southern Ocean, from the P. Mikhailov's album

Since Arctic summer had not ended, it was decided to try once again to reach more southerly latitudes. On January 25, taking advantage of the good weather and the lack of ice fields, Bellingshausen visited Mirny where he discussed further plans with Lazarev. On January 26, the vessels moored to a giant table-shaped iceberg up to 200 feet (61 m), and saw large herds of sperm whales. The report from February 5 stated the following:

Seeing the ice islands, that by surface and by edges were similar with the surface and edges of the sizable ice as mentioned above located before us; we concluded that these ice masses and all similar ice from its gravity, or other physical reasons, separated from the ice-covered shore, carried by the winds, floating over the space of the Arctic Ocean…

On February 5–6, at a point of 69°6'24" south latitude and 15°51'45" west longitude, the expedition reached the edge of "rocky mountain ice". Floating ice resembled that in the freezing bays of the Northern Hemisphere. The surface of the sea was covered with grease ice. Though February in the Southern hemisphere is considered a summer month, thermometer recordings showed the temperature at −4 °R (−5 °C). Bellingshausen consulted with Lazarev and concluded that firewood stocks on both sloops were decreasing, and the crew would soon have to chop water and wine barrels. Nevertheless, they decided to proceed further. To cheer up the crew, during the last three days of Cheese week, cooks baked pancakes, made out of rice flour. Along with a glass of punch, the crew was allowed to get a pint of beer made out of English concentrate; "for those who do not know, cheerful spirit and pleasure strengthen health; on the contrary, boredom and dullness cause laziness and untidiness that lead to scurvy".

On February 14, Bellingshausen wrote in his journal the coordinates 69°59' south latitude, and 37°38' west longitude:

At midnight we saw in the southwest direction a small light on the horizon, that looked like sunrise and expanded for almost 5 degrees; when we set the course on the south, this light increased. I suggested that it came from a large ice field, however, with the sunrise, this light got less visible, and when the sun came up, there were some stuffed clouds, and no ice. We had never seen such a phenomenon before.

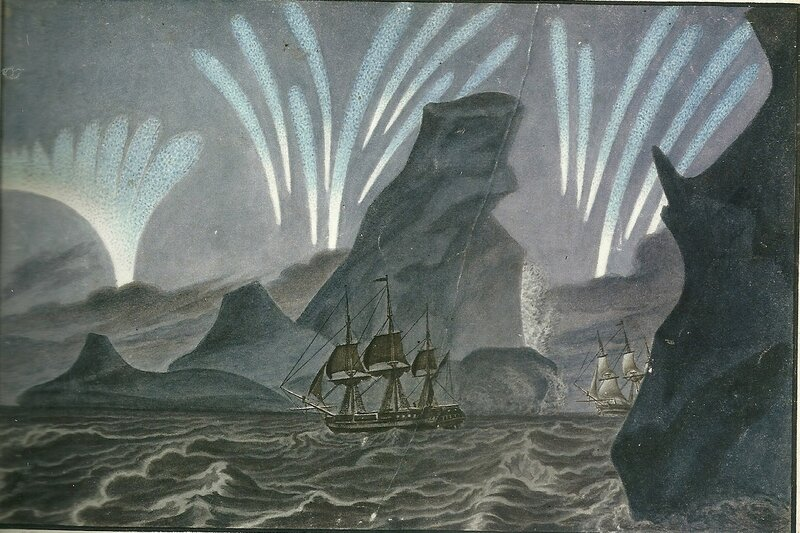
Southern lights, from the P. Mikhailov's album

Thus, for the third time the expedition came close to the edge of the ice continent (Enderby Land). On February 14, the route of the Russian expedition crossed with Cook's route, followed by the navigator in 1775. At that time there was a strong fog and a squall; the sloops got into ice fields while the sails and instruments froze. This presented a large danger. On February 26 due to storms and ice fields, steering on Vostok was almost impossible, and all attempts at repair works failed.

By that time, shop gear and masts had become damaged, and the soldiers' health conditions were also unsatisfactory. On February 21, sailor Fedor Istomin died on Mirny. According to doctor Galkin, he died of Typhoid fever, though Bellingshausen's report states that it was just a "nervous fever". On March 3, expedition participants observed significant noctilucent clouds: "In the south we first observed two white-blue pillars, looking like phosphoric fire that came out of the clouds at the speed of rockets; every pillar was the width of three suns in diameter. Thus this shining took that amazed us expanded on the horizon for almost 120°, passing the zenith. Finally, closer to the end of the phenomenon, the whole sky was covered with such pillars. On March 4, we observed a different picture: "all the sky, from the horizon to 12 or 15°, was covered with rainbow-colored strips that as fast as a flash of lightning ran from south to north, and changed their color constantly"; this phenomenon allowed the crews to get away from a collision with an iceberg. Sailors on Mirny even thought that the "sky is on fire". On March 4, Mikhailov depicted the biggest icebergs that they encountered during their travels, the height of which reached 408 feet (124 m), that even exceeded the height of the Saints Peter and Paul Cathedral in Saint Petersburg. On the same day it was decided that the sloops would part: Vostok would travel directly to Sidney, while Mirny would explore vast territory to the South of Van Diemen's Land (Tasmania). Since there were more people on Vostok than on Mirny, for the period of Great Lent, Bellingshausen transferred to his board a priest who would have to return to Lazarev in Australia. As a result, the vessel lost topsails and staysails. Sailor hammocks were put on shrouds (Note: Shrouds supported mizzen mast) to fulfill the function of storm sails. The ship was also carried into cohesive ice fields. Further, the waves leveled upwind hooks, water backstay (Note: Standing rigging (in the 19th century – thick tarry tackle) of a bowsprit holding it from the sides), and krambal backstay (Note: Standing rigging of krambal (a short thick bar in the form of a console extending overboard) supporting it from the sides) on the bowsprit. The crew put a great effort in to saving the mast from collapse. At night it was "very unpleasant to see the movement of parts of the sloop, and listen to its cracking". At 3 am on March 10 Vostok just barely missed a destructive iceberg. The weather was so bad that on March 11 it was impossible to control the vessel, and the ship just followed the wind, while wet snow made it impossible to make any outdoor repairs. Only by midnight on March 12 did the weather get a bit better, and on March 13 the crew saw its last iceberg on the way to Australia.

=== Sailing to Australia and Oceania (March–November 1820) ===
==== First arrival in Australia ====
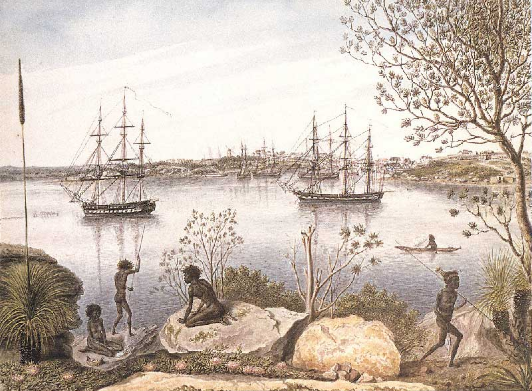
View on Sydney, from P. Mikhailov's album

Squalls continued until arrival in the Port Jackson. On March 19, martin-geek was knocked down, and the sloop "Vostok" experienced both ship rolling and keel pitching which got stronger on March 21. Bellingshausen defined it as "horrible". At this day at 10 am the sloop laid on its side, and while saving the priest, navigator Poryadin broke his head of the wooden partition. Thanks to the skills of doctor Berg, he fully recovered in Australia. On March 24, sailors at 47° south latitude saw Tasmania], and on 27th – on the eve of Easter – Australia that was at 37° longitude. The temperature increased to 13 °R (16,2 °C), and this made it possible to dry all sails and open all hatches. For the Easter Vigil, the whole crew was wearing ceremonial summer uniform. People fasted with Kuliches. At 8 pm, the vessels crossed the Botany Bay. A day later, the "Vostok" anchored in Port Jackson. By the time vessel arrived in Sydney, only two sailors had shown signs of scurvy. Head physician Berg treated them with a decoction of pine cones, while Bellingshausen gave them half of the glass (29 millilitres) of lemon juice per day. Pigs and rams also suffered from the scurvy; when they were released ashore they could not eat fresh grass. Antarctic sailing lasted for 130 days, staying in Sydney – 40.

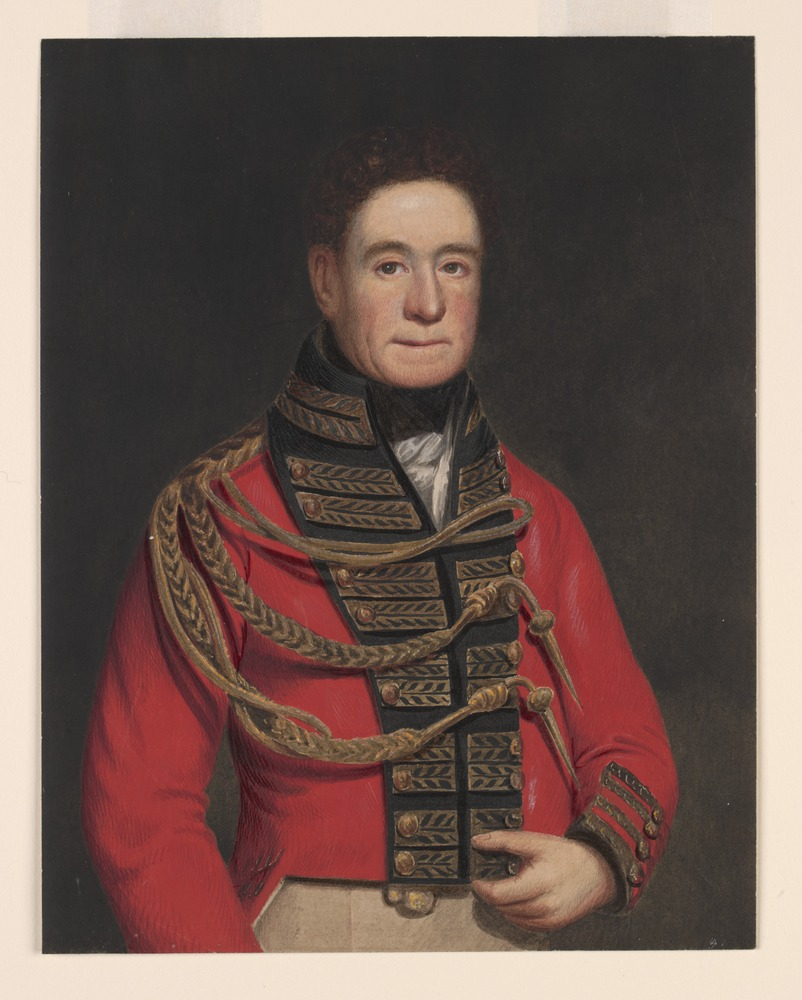
Portrait of Governor of Macquarie Island by Arthur Levett Jackson, 1784

The first time when Bellingshausen met with the governor of Macquarie Lachlan Macquarie was on March 27. The captain could read English, but barely understood oral speech; thus, lieutenant Demidoff served as a translator. Macquarie mentioned Bellingshausen in his diary on April 11 (March 29 according to Julian calendar) as a "commander of the union of two ships that were sent to discover the south pole". Before that, on April 7, the expedition went to Macquarie Lighthouse – a new lighthouse that in the colony was considered almost like a world miracle. After "Mirny"'s arrival on 7 (19) April, captain-lieutenant Zavadovsky became the chief interpreter for Bellingshausen. Previously, Zavadovsky served with him on the Black Sea. Lazarev, who served in the Royal Navy of Great Britain, also facilitated successful negotiations. Macquarie himself visited Russia in 1807 and was even able to recall a few Russian words. The governor provided a free supply of water, firewood and business wood (Note: Round and chopped timber, except for firewood and wood, unsuitable for industrial processing, as well as stubble osmol and wood chips), and also provided them with a place in Sydney harbour where the crew could set transit instruments (Kirribilli Point).

Simonov' assistants were two sub-navigators and a non-commissioned artillery officer. They also opened a bathhouse on the shore, which officers and sailors willingly used. According to Barratt, "it was the first sauna in Australia". First contacts with Indigenous Australians were also quite successful – the crew contacted Cammeraygal and its leader Bungari. On April 13, "Mirny" after unloading, was run aground, and the damage caused by Antarctic ice was repaired in three days. Russian sailors were impressed with courtesy and diligence of the merchant Robert Campbell and his colleagues.

Before that, in February 1820, the sloops "Otkrytie" and "Blagonamerennyi" also went to Australia, and by thus their commanders flagrantly violated the rules set by the "Admiralty" – they did not prepare an interim report on the first season of the expedition, which should have been transmitted to St. Petersburg. Bellingshausen sent the report on the second day after the arrival of "Mirny", but, due to several circumstances, mail to London was only sent on September 9 – 12 days before Bellingshausen's second arrival in Australia. As a result of all the difficulties, in the journal of the Ministry of the Sea Forces, Bellingshausen's report was registered only on April 21, 1821. Staying in Sydney was overshadowed with a victim in one of the last days – on May 2 (14) during repairs of the "Vostok" main mast, locksmith Matvey Gubin (who was called as "Gubin" in the captain's report) fell from the height of 14 meters, and after nine days died at sea from the injuries. On May 7, the expedition left Sidney, heading towards Society Islands.

==== Researching New Zealand and Tuamotus ====
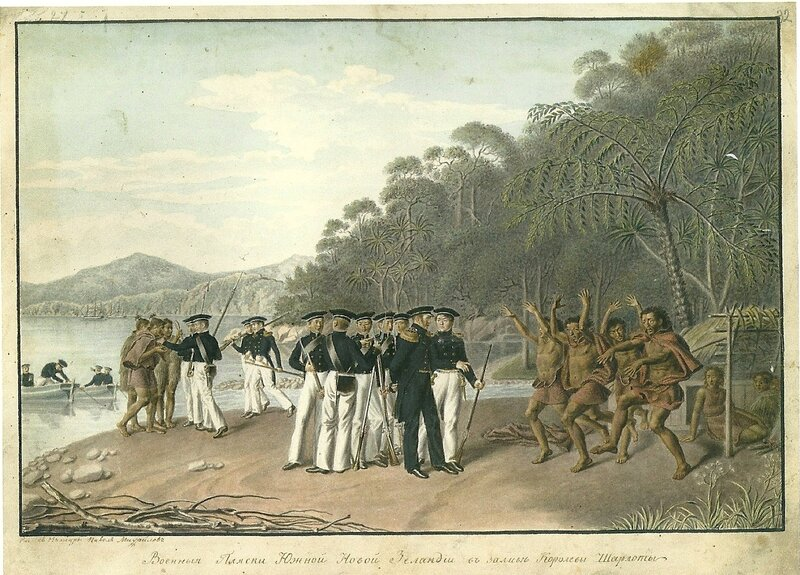
Military dances of South New Zealand in the Queen Charlotte Sound on May 30, 1820. From the P. Mikhailov's album

In the open sea, the crew found out that one sailor from "Vostok" and few from "Mirny" caught up a sexually transmitted disease in Port Jackson. This type of diseases was especially widespread in Australia which was at that time a place where convicts were sent from Britain. Vessels did not escape may storms, and the crew got used to pitchings and winds. However, the calm that suddenly established at 8 pm on May 19 provoked a strong lateral pitching, because of which "Vostok" scooped up so much water from the scavut netting (Note: Netting on scavut (a part of the topmast on the ship between fore mast and main mast) that is used for storing sailors' beds) that the water level in hold increased from 13 to 26 inches. Also, the stream of water in the mess crushed lieutenant Zavodskoy. Scattered gun cores that rolled from side to side made it difficult to repair the damage. Pitching continued for the next day as well. On May 24 at 7 am, travellers reached New Zealand and anchored in the Queen Charlotte Sound to make contacts with Māori people. Bellingshausen used Cook' maps and descriptions. Historian Barratt named the following events as "comparative ethnography session". These ethnographic observations turned out to be extremely important since the places that Russian sailors had visited were connection points between tribes of North Island and South Island. In 1828 colonizers destroyed hapū notes, and Mikhailov' depictions became historical sources of paramount importance.

The expedition left New Zealand on June 3. Since this time of the year corresponded to December of the Northern Hemisphere, by June 5 the sloops got to the epicentre of a strong squall with rains and hails, which calmed down only by June 9. Using ship forest (Note: Individual plantations or forest areas, incorporating the best in growth and development of oak, pine, larch trees) that was made while the crew visited Māori people, on June 17, the crew started to repair ships in the open sea. They sewn up the sails, reduced the main yard (Note: First yard from below on the main mast) on "Vostok" for 6 feet, set high coamings on hatches, and etcetera.

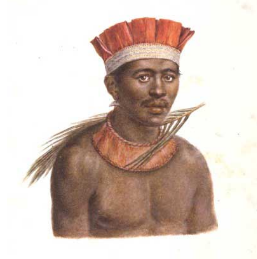
One of the types of natives from the island of Grand Duke Alexander Nikolaevich. From the P. Mikhailov's album

On June 29, the expedition reached Rapa Iti. On July 5, the crew saw on the horizon Hao island that was also familiar to Cook. On July 8, Russians discovered Amanu. During their attempt to land, Bellingshausen, Mikhailov, Demidoff, Lazarev, Galkin, Novosilsky, and Annenkov, were attacked by locals who were quite hostile towards the foreigners. Overall, more than 60 warriors hindered the landing on the northern coast.

Such a resistance made us come back. This resistance is coming, obviously, from the absolute ignorance of our firearms and our superiority. If we decided to kill several locals, then, of course, all others would start to run, and we have an opportunity to land. However, satisfying my curiosity from a quite close distance, I did not have any desire to be at that island… <...> When we were quite far from the island, then women ran out of the forest on the seaside and lifted their clothes, showing us the lower parts of their bodies, clapping hands on them, others were dancing as if they wanted to show us how weak we were. Some of the crew members asked permission to punish them for insolence and shoot at them, but I did not agree.

On July 10, the sloops reached Fangatau, on July 12 they discovered Takume and Raroia, on July 14 – Taenga, on July 15 – Makemo and Katiu, on July 16 – Tahanea and Faaite, on July 17 – Fakarava, on July 18 – Niau. Locals were hostile almost everywhere; thus Bellingshausen actively used artillery and salutes from coloured rockets launched at night, believing that fear would be the best guarantee against attacks. One of the few exceptions was Nihiru island that was first described on July 13. Islanders came close to ships on canoe and suggested pearl and fishing hooks, cut out of seashells. The eldest of locals was fed with dinner at the officers' table, was put in red hussar uniform, and given silver medal with the image of Alexander I on it. Bellingshausen asked native rower to bring a young woman on board, whom they gave earrings, mirror, and a piece of red cloth to which she immediately wrapped, while her clothes were left for ethnographic collection. Officers were surprised that woman hesitated while changing clothes since it directly contradicted European descriptions of Polynesian manners. Academic Mikhailov depicted the islanders against the backdrop of the coastal landscape, and at 4 pm they were returned to shore. The local climate was heavy: Bellingshausen noted that in the battery deck where the crew slept, the temperature increased to 28 °R (35 °C). However, the heat did not depress the crew. A number of discovered islands were proposed to be named as Russian islands. Barrett stated that at that time this decision was justified since Kotzebue described most of the islands while Bellingshausen and Lazarev systemized his discoveries. However, on an international level, Russian names have not been fixed, one of the reasons for that was that the islands were part of a large archipelago Tuamato. On modern Western maps from those Russian names and surnames, only Raeffsky Islands remained.

==== Bellingshausen and coral islands formation ====
In his commentaries to the English translation of the Bellingshausen's book, Frank Debenham mentioned that he was surprised that Russian sailor was able to ask and solve hard scientific questions. Long before Charles Darwin, he explained the process of coral islands formation. He based his knowledge on Kotzebue' works, and his observations. Bellingshausen thought that all Pacific islands were peaks of seamounts, which edged with surrounded with coral reefs – a product of the slow creative activity of the smallest organisms. A typical example was island Niau:

Coral islands and shallows, also mountains range parallel to the mountains of North American Cordillera on Isthmus of Panama, and the main mountain ranges coming from the sea, the peaks of which form Society islands, Hawaii, and even small islands of Pitcairn, Oparo, and others, have the same direction. Coral islands and shallows for many centuries had been slowly built by anthozoa. All of them prove the direction and bends of the underwater ridges. Of the coral islands that I have acquired, the island of Greig represents a part of the top of the ridge, somewhat out of the sea and consisting of layered stone, while the remaining parts are coral… I am sure that when all coral islands on maps put correctly, then one would count on how many significant underwater ridges are they based.

Bellingshausen correctly explained a paradox that was noted by German naturalist Georg Forster – a scarcity of Leeward islands near Tahiti. He claimed that the reason for that could be a great depth (according to contemporary measurements – about 11000 meters), and lack of knowledge of coral growth conditions. Johann Friedrich von Eschscholtz, Adelbert von Chamisso and Darwin agreed on Bellingshausen’ conclusions.

==== Tahiti ====
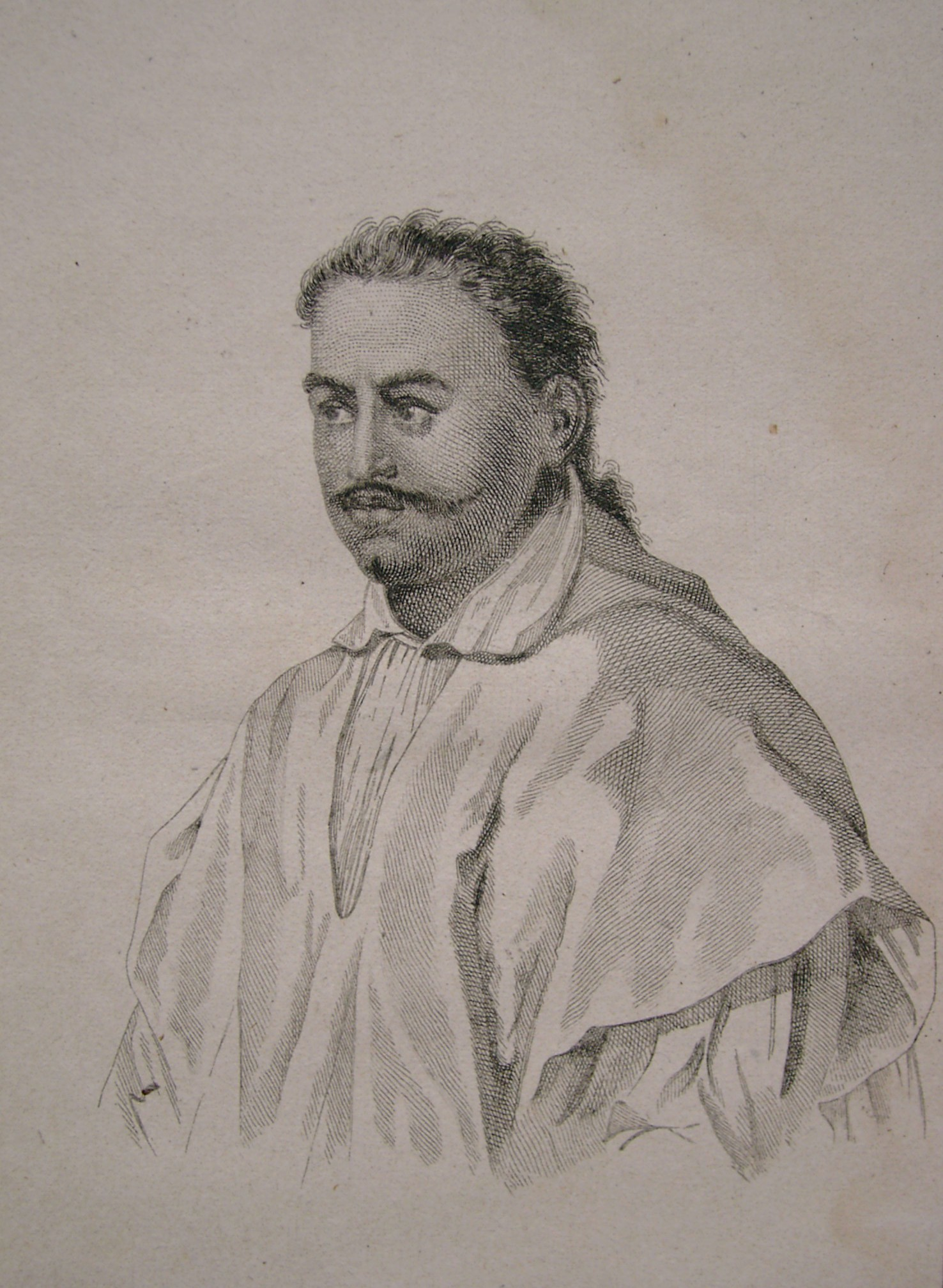
Tahiti king Pōmare II. Engraving from the Publishing House of Firmin Didot, 1836

On July 20, the expedition reached Makatea, and in two days vessels anchored in Tahiti. Barratt paid attention to the fact that Russians arrived on the island that, thanks to the activities of missionaries, was quite different from descriptions made by Foster or Louis Antoine de Bougainville. Bellingshausen understood how fragile local culture is. For example, in New Zealand, he described how potato farming had changed the diet and behaviour of local people, still following the ancient way of life. On Tahiti, Bellingshausen and his companions had to first endear participants of the British mission – subordinates of reverend Henry Nott, and only then make contacts with aborigens.

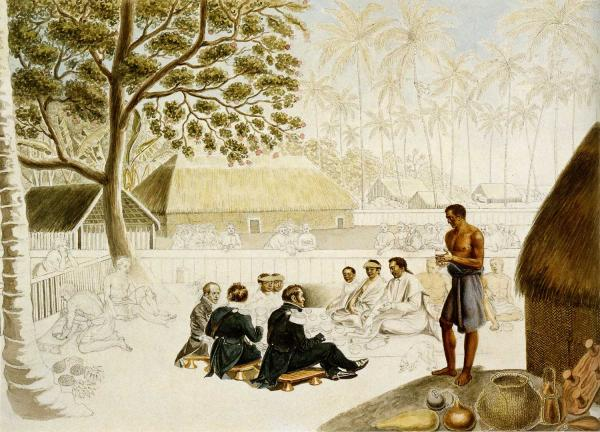
Breakfast with Pōmare II. From the P. Mikhailov's album

"Vostok" and "Mirny" anchored in the Matavai Bay, at the same place where the ship of Samuel Wallis had anchored. Russian ships got visited by hundreds of people, however, from all these new contacts, the most useful was New England native Williams, who began to serve as Lazarev's interpreter. They also found an interpreter for "Vostok". Soon missionary Nott also visited the vessels, whom Bellingshausen defined as a royal messenger. Later, Bellingshausen and Simonov witnessed arguments between Pōmare II and the head of missionaries. For instance, when the king was prohibited from consuming alcohol (from which he died in 18 months after Russians' visit), or when he had to slam the door in front of the missionary's nose to remain alone with the captain (July 23). Most often, however, it was Nott who mediated between Pōmare II and Bellingshausen and Lazarev; it was the missionary who allocated Point Venus for Simonov' observations and Mikhailov' drawings. Bellingshausen who was a sincere monarchist and who did not have an opportunity to get into much details on how Polynesian society functioned, thought that the king was the leader of the island, and negotiated with him on the supply of sloops and other things. At the day of the arrival on July 22, Russians received a gift of four pigs, coconuts, taro, yams, and many bananas, planed and mountainous. The gift was beneficial because of the depletion of Australian supplies. On July 26, procurement was carried out by exchanging goods and trinkets intended for this purpose by the Admiralty Department. The crew bought 10 barrels of lemons for each sloop and salted them instead of cabbage. The king got red cloth, woollen blankets, coloured chintz and shawls, mirrors, axes, glassware, and so on. He also received a medal with the profile of the Russian emperor. King granted Bellingshausen three pearls that were "slightly larger than peas". For the royal white robes, the captain donated several of his sheets. Despite the short stay, time in Tahiti fully cured several scurvy patients who had not fully recovered in Australia.

On July 27, travellers left Tahiti and on July 30 reached Tikehau correcting Kotzebue' navigation mistakes on their way. At the same day they discovered Mataiva, on August 3 – Vostok Island, on August 8 – Rakahanga, after which the expedition headed towards Port Jackson. On August 16, vessels passed Vavaʻu. On August 19, they put on the map two small coral islands of Mikhailov and Simonov (21° south latitude, 178° longitude) in Fiji archipelago. On August 30, Filimon Bykov (in the report – "Filipp Blokov") who served as a sailor on "Vostok", fell from the bowsprit to the sea at the Emperor's name day. To save him, the crew launched the boat under the command of Lieutenant Annenkov; however, swell was too strong, and Bykov could not be found. The report of the Minister of the Sea Forces de Traversay indicated that there was a strong storm that day.

==== Second stay in Australia ====
On September 10, the sloops anchored in Port Jackson. The second stay in Sydney lasted until the end of October since "Vostok" required a serious corpus repair was needed – in particular, strengthening steps of the masts. Generally, the crew felt that they came back to "native places", that was especially important for young travellers, such as Simonov or Novosilsky. Officers were more involved in the social life of the colony; they were regularly invited to dinner parties, dinners or balls. In his notes, Simonov described one of such balls where he talked to a wife of local English authority. One of the topics that they discussed was a beauty of Kazan Tatars:

Beauty is a relative condition, and, maybe, Bongaree and your neighbors, and even our neighbors on East India Company, citizens of Greater China, differently perceive it.

Then Bellingshausen started to systematically study social and economic aspects of life in New South Wales colony. Barratt noticed that Bellingshausen's lengthy and informative notes published in the "Dvukratnyh izyskanijah" (Note: It could be translated as "Double Study") were based on observations and extracts made by half a dozen of his subordinates. Collected statistic data, including market price order, has the importance of a primary source. There is some evidence that doctor Stein who measured atmospheric pressure and geodesist Hockley shared information with Russian sailors and professor Simonov. Painter Mikhailov depicted landscapes and portraits of aborigines. From the scientific point of view, botanic observations were especially notable – "Herbarium" on "Vostok" included no less than 25 types of South Walles endemism. The crew gave to governor Macquarie and captain of the harbour John Piper some saccharum officinarum, sprouted coconuts and taro from Tahiti and Fiji islands, for plant breeding. In Australia, educated Russian officers were mostly attracted by its "exotic", which was not surprising, since they visited this place the first and the last time in their lives. For instance, the crew took 84 birds on board, first of all, parrots (including cockatoo and loriinae), they also had pet kangaroo. By October 30, all repair works on "Vostok" were finished, and the boarding of supplies was completed. The next day the observatory and the forge were lifted aboard. On the last day, the crew took aboard sheep and 46 pigs for a tough Antarctic raid. The outgoing Russian division was escorted by a royal salute from ships and coastal batteries.

=== Second season of the expedition (November 1820 – August 1821) ===
==== Secondary Antarctic investigation ====
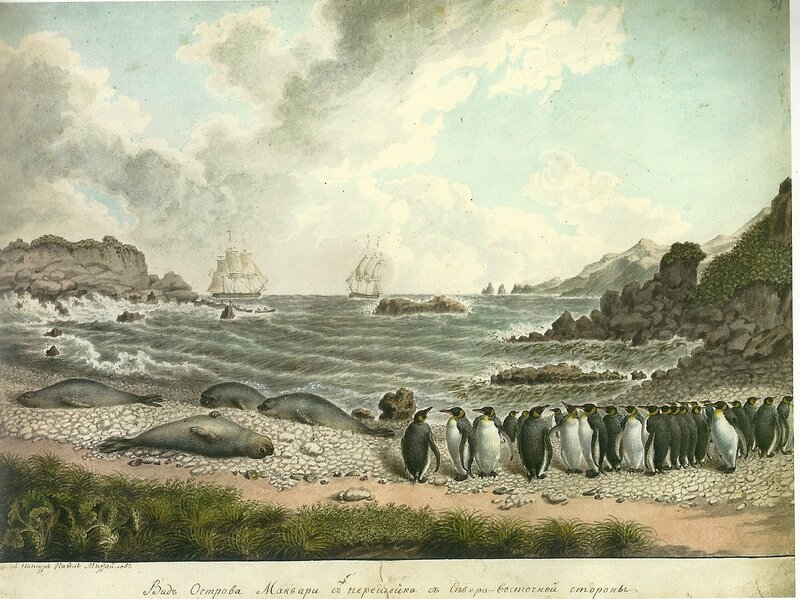
Macquarie from the northeast side. Watercolor from the album of P. Mikhailov

On October 31, Russian expedition left Sydney and continued to study the Southern Ocean. For a new trip to polar waters, the crew redistributed the cargo on "Vostok" – the cannons were removed and lowered into the hold, leaving only carronades, the spare mast was stored in the lower deck, beams were strengthened with pillars, lashes were put near with the masts. As was in the first voyage, the main hatch in the mess was equipped with a vestibule to save heat; all hatches were upholstered with canvas, the main hatch was glazed, spars were shortened for yards. On November 7, officers decided on the following plan: heading towards Macquarie island, and in case if the sloops part, wait for each other nearby South Shetland Islands, or in Rio. If one of the sloops disappear – follow the instructions. On November 8, a leak opened on the board of "Vostok", which could not be localized and caulked until the end of the voyage.

On November 17, 1820, travellers reached Macquarie where they observed rookery of elephant seals and penguins. In their reports, expedition participants mentioned parrots, wild cats, and temporary dugouts industrialists from Port Jackson. The crew treated seal hunters with dried bread with butter and grog. The expedition was on the island until November 19, because they were expecting the production of carcasses of a sea elephant with a head for stuffing. On November 27, the expedition reached 60° south longitude, and the next day came across close-knit ice fields, because of which, the movement to the south had to be stopped. The ship turned east since the "Vostok" corpus was too weak. On November 29, they passed five big icebergs, after which they made some ice. On December 6, travellers celebrated the day of Saint Nicholas with a prayer. For that, they transferred a priest from "Mirny". After the frosts had started, the team brewed ginger tea with the addition of rum. For a holiday, cooks prepared shchi from fresh pork with sour cabbage or salted lemons (to save some cabbage), and added sago. Raw meat was prepared once or twice per week and was served to sailors together with porridge. Also, on holidays, sailors received a glass of vodka and a half mug of beer diluted from the essence. "By these methods we were able to satisfy staff so much, that many of them forgot about their ailments". On December 12, vessels passed a giant iceberg; Bellingshausen calculated that water stored in it would be enough for world population for 22 years and 86 days if every of 845 million would use only one bucket per day. Despite continuing bad weather, the crew set up a prayer for Christmas. At that day, vessels collided with a piece of sharp ice that shattered the anchor and ripped out underwater copper sheets for three feet. According to the captain's estimates, the crew was saved by a miracle, since the blow occurred during swinging down pitching. Otherwise, the ship would inevitably receive a hole and would be flooded. However, it did not destroy the festive mood of the crew:

…after dinner, the crew was given a good glass of punch, and they were not occupied with any small work, on the contrary, the sailors had fun with various folk games, and sang songs.

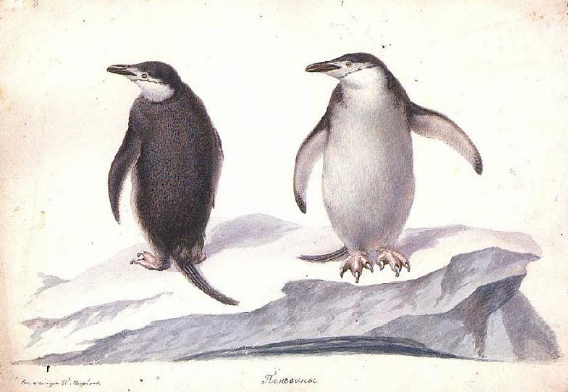
Penguins. Watercolour from the P. Mikhailov's album

Further sailing was challenging due to stormy weather and large ice fields. On January 1, 1821, there was fog and rain. For the New Year celebration, the crew was granted with a glass of punch for the emperor's health. To "differentiate this day from any other days", Bellingshausen ordered to make coffee with rum, and this "unusual for sailors drink pleased them, and they spent the whole day until evening in a cheerful mood". A large stock of dry firewoods, taken on board in Australia, made the everyday life of the crew more or less tolerable: at zero air temperature in the living deck, thanks to the continuous use of stoves, it was maintained +11 °R (13,7 °C).

On January 10, the expedition discovered the Peter I Island named after founder of the Russian navy Peter the Great. However, ice fields that surrounded the island hindered the sloops from coming closer; thus, the landing did not take place. On January 17, the expedition noticed a shore with a high mountain located at 68° south latitude, 75° longitude; which was later named as Alexander Island. In contemporary Western historiography, there is a prevailing opinion that was the largest achievement of the Bellingshausen's expedition even though island character of the land was discovered only 100 years later. On January 24, sailors reached Nova Scotia (South Shetland Islands), about which they had only vague ideas. An actual question at that time was if Nova Scotia was a part of the Southern mainland, or it is one of the subantarctic islands. When the last was revealed, the first island was named Borodino (now it is called "Smith"). The next day on January 25, travellers discovered Small Yaroslavets (Snow) and Theil Island (Deception). There the crew met the vessel of captain Nathaniel Palmer who hunted fur seals. Then they put on the map islands Smolensk (Livingston), Berezin (Greenwich), Leipzig (Robert) and Nelson. The islands were named so to perpetuate the victories of Russian weapons in Napoleonic Wars. The expedition described the King George Island to which two lieutenants were landed – Leskov and Demidov. On January 29, while heading northeast, travellers discovered Three Brothers (now called "Espeland", "O'Brien" and "Edie"), and then even bigger islands of north-eastern archipelago: Gibbs Island, Elephant Island, Cornwallis Island and Clarence Island.

On February 3, Bellingshausen ordered divisions to count the third day of the month two days in a row, since the expedition rounded the world. On February 4, around 9 am, a heavy squall had started. During the storm, "Vostok" came under 10 knots even under the ship reefs. Because of the pitching, a lot of water got to the sloop, and the crew had to pump it out of the hold. Fortunately, repair of pumps was finished just a day before the squall.

==== Bellingshausen and Palmer ====
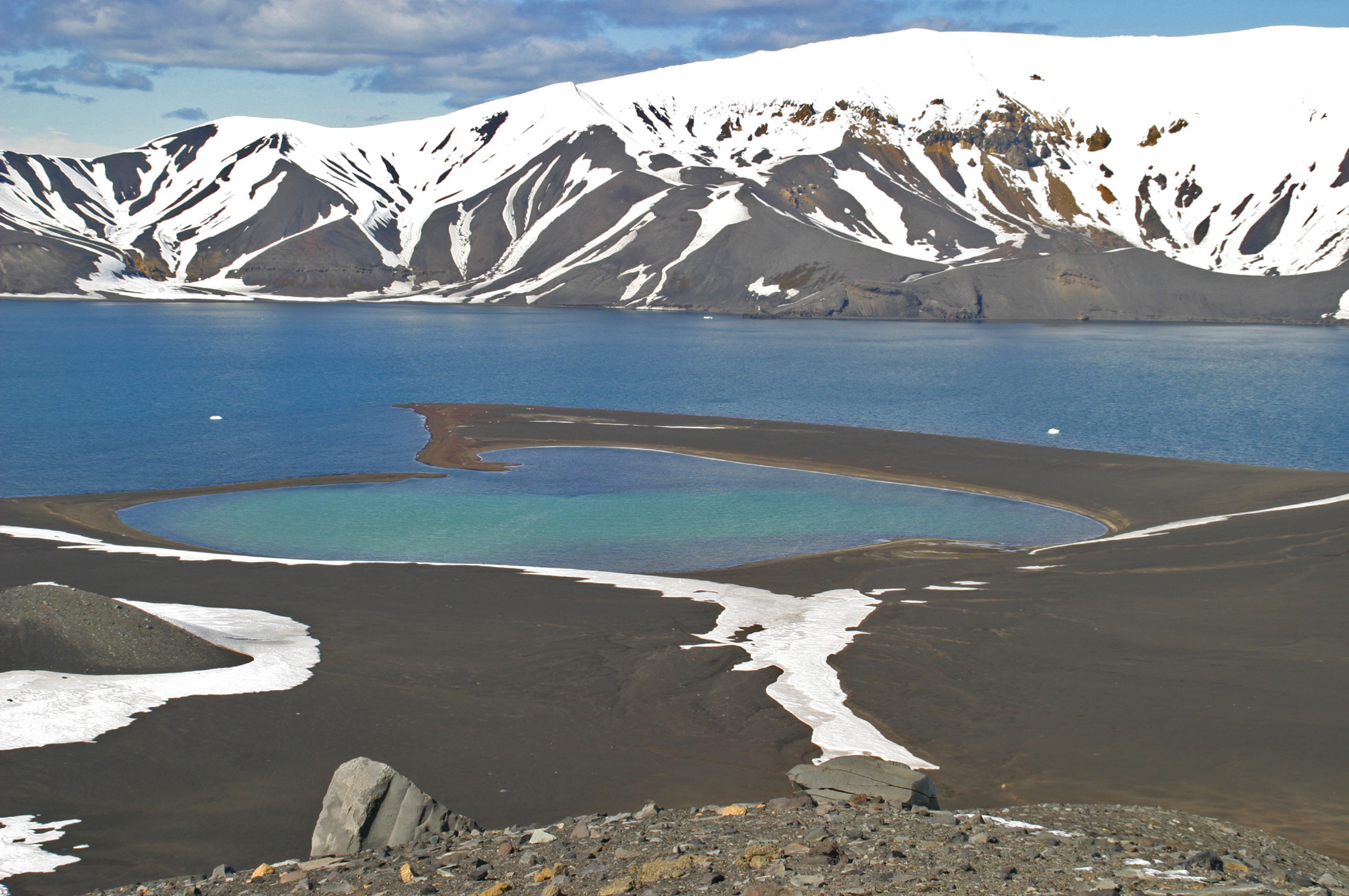
Caldera, 2005

On January 24 (February 5), 1821, on the South Shetland Islands, 42-year-old Bellingshausen met with 21-year old Nathaniel Palmer who was at that time the head of local industrial sealers. As it turned out to be in the 20th century, this meeting was fateful. As later Bulkeley noted, it was similar to a rendezvous of Matthew Flinders and Nicolas Baudin. Since original diaries and travel journals of "Vostok" had not been preserved, Bellingshausen's own evidence of a meeting with Palmer is on the 14th sheet of the report. On January 24, the sloop was in the strait between the islands Livingston and Deception. According to Bellingshausen's description, the conversation was about fur seals' fishing prospects and anchors of Theil Island: "the strait in which we saw eight anchored vessels, was closed from all winds, has a depth of seventeen fathoms, soil – liquid sludge; from the quality of this soil ships often drift even from two anchors. Two English and one American vessel got torn from anchors and wrecked". In his diary, Novosilsky especially emphasized that Bellingshausen and Palmer did not talk about anything else. In the original of "Dvukratnykh izyskanii" (1831), Palmer's second name was misspelt as "Palmor", which was presumably a consequence of literary editing. On the contrary, Palmer's original journal (and others' sealers) is stored at the Library of Congress. In later American descriptions of the second half of the 19th century, Palmer was mentioned as the discoverer of Antarctica, which was primarily based on his own memoirs of 1876. At the same time, a highly controversial question was the exchange of information between Bellingshausen and Palmer. Frank Debenham suggested that Bellingshausen found out about the existence of the Southern continent from Palmer, but did not fully understand him due to the lack of knowledge of English language. Then, American researchers cast doubt on Palmer's memoirs, since Bellingshausen had a legal agreement to research Southern continent, and could not help but try to verify the information received from the industrialist. Palmer was not a good cartographer or navigator, and his claims on the meeting on the Deception islands are refuted by the Bellingshausen's report card, on which there are no signs of caldera.

==== The second visit of Brazil ====
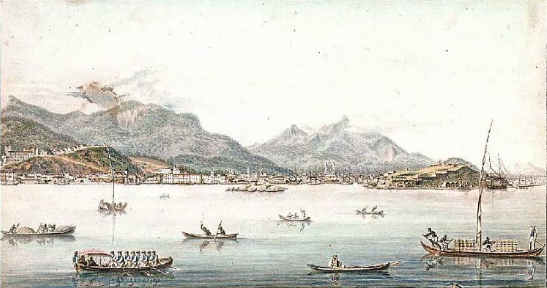
View on Rio de Janeiro, from the P. Mikhailov's album

On February 8, 1821, the expedition headed to Rio de Janeiro. For the first time for the last three months, the crew was able to open all the hatches and to air all living decks and holds. Taken biological samples (Australian birds and penguins from Nova Scotia) got sick, many of them died. On February 11, birds were first carried out into the air. The next day, there was a strong downpour that allowed the crew to wash all sailor beds and collect more than 100 buckets of water for domestic use. On February 19, the last fur seal taken from Nova Scotia died; he had been living on the board for 23 days. On February 23, one of the Australian cockatoo that was released from the cage, fell off to the sea from the tackle. However, "Vostok" went with low speed and the crew was able to lower a pole to water, to which the cockatoo was able to clung. Eventually, on February 27, travellers anchored in the Guanabara Bay, where vice consul (Note: The third senior consular post (the first is the Consul General and Consul)) Petr Kilhen met them. He stated that the kingdom adopted Spanish Constitution of 1812, and the court was preparing for moving to Lisbon. Bellingshausen instructed vice-consul to find a merchant who would set a bracket for strengthening the corpus of the vessel. On February 28, the captain travelled to the plenipotentiary ambassador baron Diederik Tuyll van Serooskerken with a report. On March 1, officers visited American frigate USS Congress that was returning from Guangzhou. Bellingshausen prohibited his crew to communicate with Americans since an epidemic raged on their board. On March 2, one of the spare roars in "Vostok" was given to Dutch frigate "Adler" that got damaged while transiting; it even did not need any repairment. Only on March 21, the crew was able to obtain oak knits through the naval port of Rio. Since in the Bellingshausen's crew there were nine professional Russian carpenters, it was decided to carry out all works by themselves. All repairs were finished only by April 2. After the Easter celebration, on April 11, the captain organized a common dinner and entertainment for officers and the crew. It was carried out on the board of "Mirny":

…none of the crew of both vessels did not even think to go ashore for a walk. I wanted them not to go to the city since they could be easily infected; sailors after being sober for such long time, when getting to freedom, might rush to all previously prohibited things: strong alcohol, and, them, women. After diseases come: fresh rum produces bloody diarrhoea, and the connection with the female sex in seaside trading places often leaves behind consequences that are incurable at sea.

On April 14, the English squadron with King Joao on board departed for Portugal; on April 18, Crown Princess Maria Isabel of Braganza granted Bellingshausen with an audience. During the meeting, the regent was given ethnographic samples from Oceania and birds of Australia; in return, the Russians received minerals and shells of Brazil. The captain complained that he and the scientists were never allowed to visit the city museum.

==== Visit to Portugal and return ====
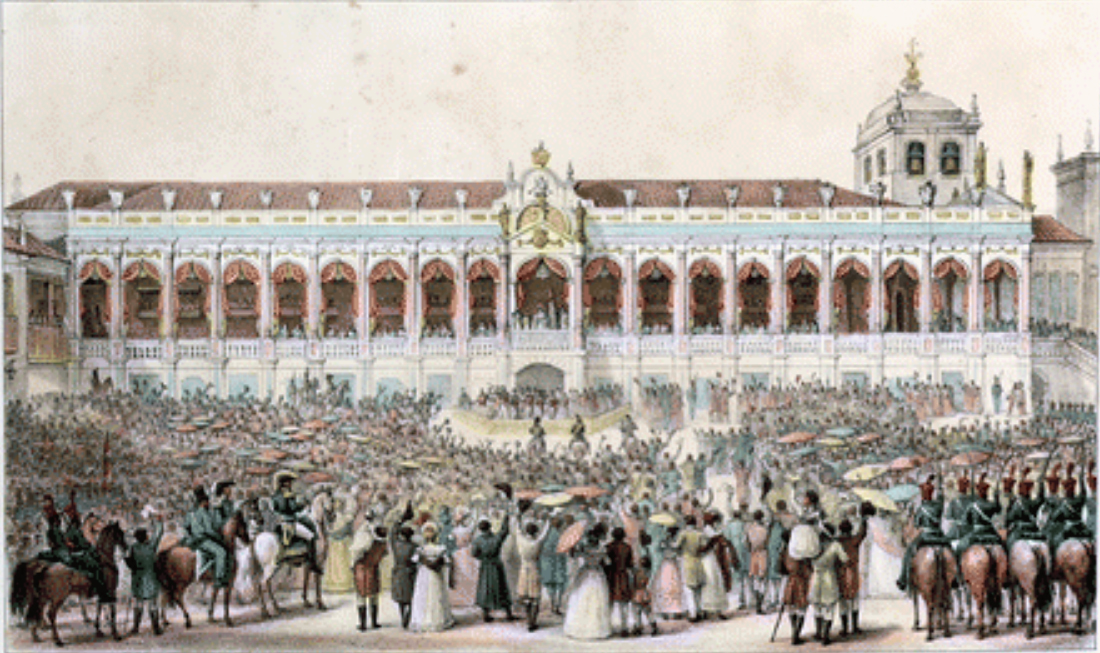
Proclamation of John VI of Portugal as a king of Portugal, Brazil and the Algarves. Engraving by Jean-Baptiste Debret.

All foreign emissaries were supposed to follow the Portugal king after he moves to Portugal. For this reason, Bellingshausen suggested Russian consul that he stays on "Vostok" and travels to Lisbon with them. Akinfiy Borodovitsyn and Dutch representative settled on "Mirny". On April 23 at 6 am, the sloops set sails and headed for Lisbon. The expedition crossed the equator in the opposite direction on May 7 at 6 pm. The next day the crew organized a festive dinner for which the Russian envoy Baron de Theil granted two rams and a bottle of wine per person from his supplies. On May 27, the vessels reached Sargasso Sea, and crossed it in almost 10 days. On June 10, travellers noticed Santa Maria Island, however, it was decided not to go ashore, but use the island's location for the course clarification. Vessels anchored in the mouth of the Tagus river on June 17. The next day, the expedition sent an officer to the Belém Tower to notify local officials that none of the crew members was infected. The captain found out that the royal squadron had not yet arrived in the city. Portugal Navy Minister and commander of the British frigate HMS Liffey Henry Duncan visited the vessels. The royal squadron appeared on June 21, and until June 24, Bellingshausen prohibited the crew from going ashore due to local rallies in the city.

Just before the departure, baron de Theil delivered a lot of fresh greens and fruits, 15 kinds of cheese and grape wine for three days on the sloops. He also issued bonuses: to each non-commissioned officer ten thalers, and to ordinary soldiers – 5 thalers. Upon departure, the Minister was honoured following the maritime charter. On June 28 at 8 am, the sloops reached the open sea, heading directly to Russia. Bellingshausen took correspondence from captain Duncan to England. Later, the sloops were in a strip of northwest winds and were able to enter the English Channel on July 6; there they were caught up by the frigate of captain Duncan, who departed three days later; Bellingshausen returned the letters to him since he did not intend to go to Britain. On July 17, the sloops anchored on the outer raid of Copenhagen waited until the morning, and on the morning bought some fresh beef and greens, and then moved on with a fair wind. On July 24, 1821, the expedition saluted Kronstadt, being absent for 751 days.

Emperor personally visited sloops in Kronstadt and spent several hours with the crew. Bellingshausen was made captain-commodore, with the 3rd-degree Order of Saint Vladimir, pension in 1200 rubles, and rent (Note: this was a type of the state reward in pre-revolutionary Russia – fixed income instead of salary) in the Courland Governorate in the amount of 1000 silver roubles. Lazarev was promoted to captain of the 2nd rank. Also, the state kept to pay him a lifelong extra salary for the rank of lieutenant, in which he was during the expedition. Lieutenants on "Vostok" and "Mirny" were awarded the 4th-degree order of St. Vladimir, and midshipmen – with the 3rd-degree order of Saint Anna. All expedition participants, including lower ranks, were assigned with a double salary for the duration of active service. A day spent in the expedition was counted for two, and lower ranks received 3 additional years of long and meritorious service. Hieromonk Dionysius received a double lieutenant salary and lifetime pension, which he did not have time to use – he died in the Alexander Nevsky Lavra on October 9, 1821. In January 1822, Ivan Ignatieff who served as a lieutenant on "Vostok", died because of mental illness that, according to Lazarev, had started during the expedition.

== Results ==
=== Geographic discoveries ===
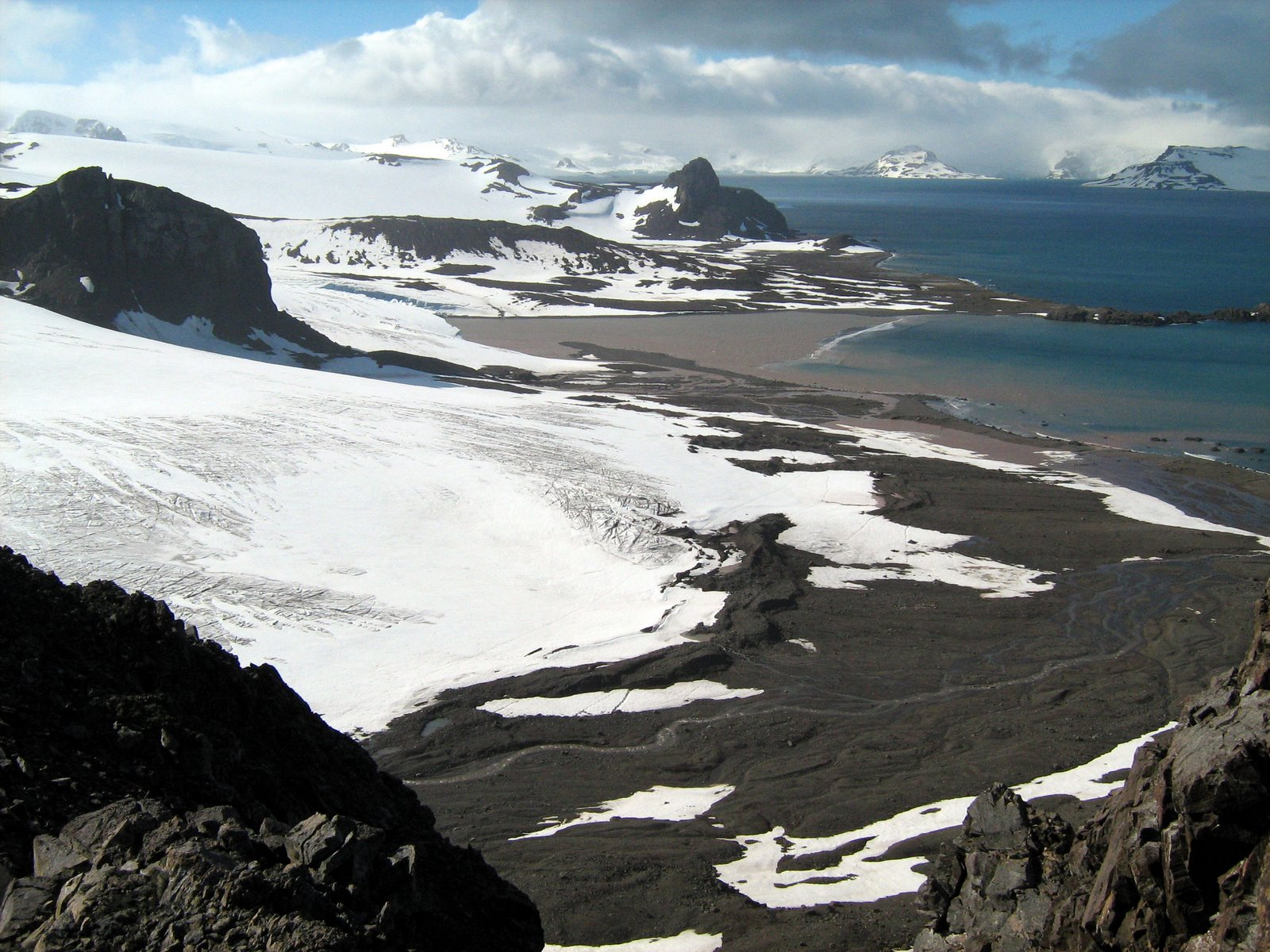
Baranowski Glacier on the King George Island

Bellingshausen concluded the description of his expedition with the following calculations:

... 29 islands were discovered, including 2 in the southern cold zone, in the south temperate – 8, and 19 – in a hot belt; 1 coral shallow with a lagoon.

In December 1819, Bellingshausen discovered south-western coast of the South Georgia Island. The map of the island, placed on page 5 of the "Atlas to the journey", remained the best for over a century. Later the expedition discovered the Annenkov Island. Some scientists conclude that James Cook had already found this island and named it "Pickersgill", but Bellingshausen did not know about it and renamed the land honouring lieutenant Annenkov. Bulkeley matched English and Russian maps and came to the conclusion that Bellingshausen had the description of the second Cook's voyage and found the island "Pickersgill" where it was already described. Thus, Annenkov Island remained unnoticed among the British. In January 1820, the expedition discovered Traversay Islands, which had not been described before the Bellingshausen's expedition; thus, Russian authority in this area is indisputable. Sailors on "Mirny" and "Vostok" finished descriptions of the South Georgia and the South Sandwich Islands which Cook observed only from the western side and suggested that they constituted a subarctic archipelago.

=== Research organization ===
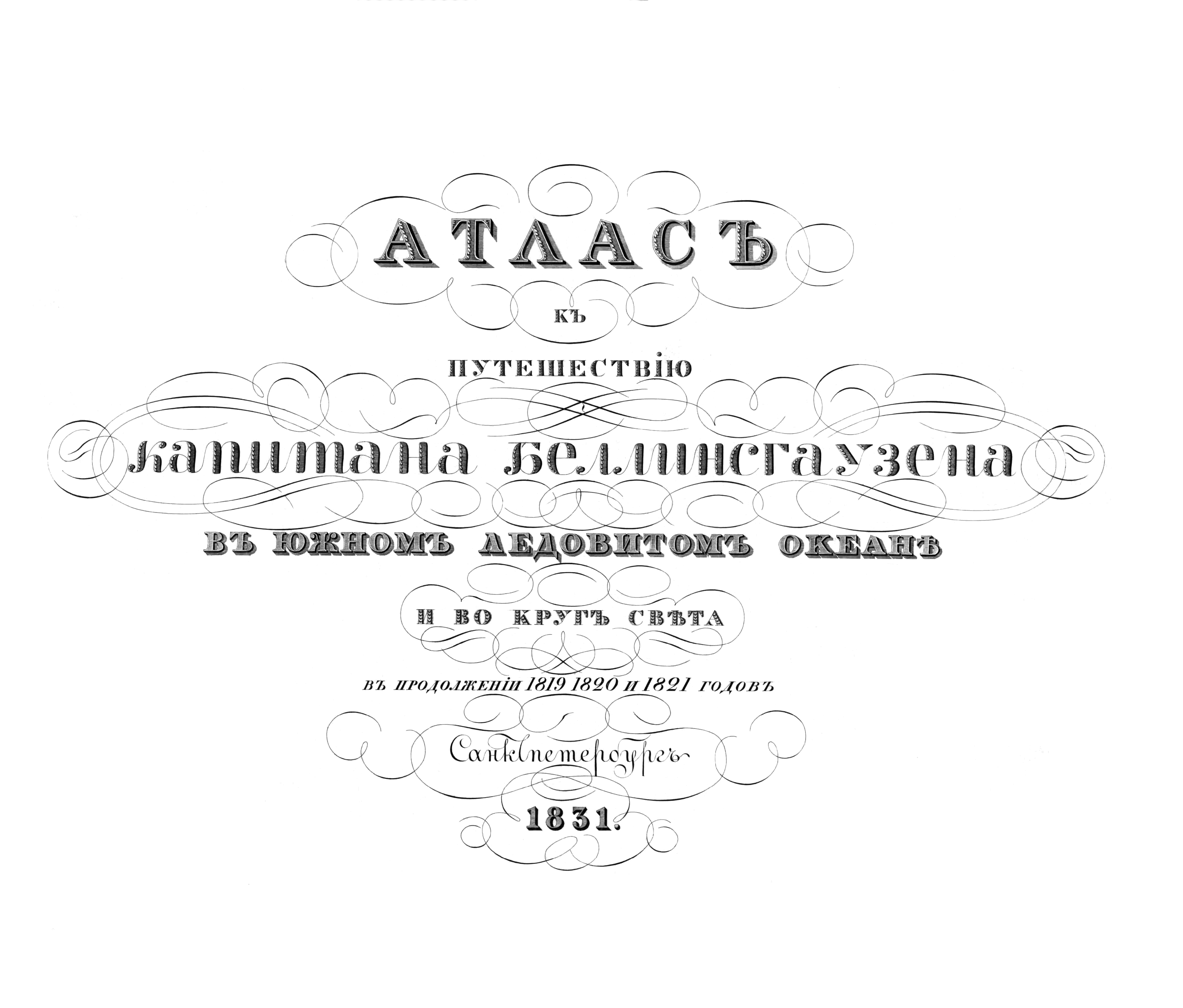
The title page of the “Atlas to the journey of captain Bellingshausen in the Southern Arctic Ocean and around the world in the continuation of 1819, 1820, and 1821”

According to historians, the small number of scientific personnel undoubtedly influenced the results and outcomes of the expedition. Bulkeley emphasized a big contrast with the Kotzebue's circumnavigation that was conducted only four years before and was sponsored with private funds. The Kotzebue's crew included four scientists for whom an extended scientific program was prepared. If on "Rurik" oceanographic observations could be conducted for 318 days in a row, then Bellingshausen had to turn to oceanography and meteorology from case to case. Conducted data on magnetic declination was not processed and not included in the final report on the expedition; it was published only in 1840 by request of Carl Friedrich Gauss. Moreover, most of the time that was spent on scientific observations, Simonov dedicated to the time-consuming process of reconciling ship chronometers. 70 out of 155 pages of Simonov's scientific report were dedicated to these calculations, which constituted 40% out of the total volume. Chronometers reconciliation took place in Rio, during stays in Sydney and the Cook Strait. Only during the second staying in Rio, the crew was able to measure 2320 lunar distances; besides, these data should still be processed before calculating the magnitude of the correction and the daily movement of the chronometer. Simonov conducted observations in the open sea as well: on October 29 and 30, and on November 1, 1819, 410 lunar distances were measured. On March 18, 1820, instrumental observation of lunar eclipse was carried out.

According to Lev Mitin, Simonov also engaged in meteorology. Defining diurnal course of Atmospheric pressure in tropical latitudes, he did 4316 hourly measurements. During the expedition, water samples were taken from the depths using a primitive bathometer made by ship means; experiments were performed with lowering the bottle to a depth; water clearance was defined with lowering a white plate to a depth; where the lead allowed, the crew measured depths (presumably, until 500 meters); there was an attempt to measure depth water temperature; scientists studied the structure of sea ice and the freezing of water of different salinity; there was a first attempt to define compass magnetic deviation at different directions. Magnetic measurements conducted by Simonov were published in 1830 by "Kazansky vestnik". Carl Gauss paid attention to this article and later translated it to German. Through Krusenstern, Gauss in 1840 requested from Bellingshausen all data on magnetic declination that the crew conducted during the expedition. These materials allowed Gauss calculating the exact position of the South Magnetic Pole, which was later confirmed by the Ross expedition.

Simonov also conducted observations of Antarctic ice shields; however, V. Koryakin did not appreciate his expertise in this field. On the one hand, astronomer suggested that "the South Pole is covered with harsh and an impenetrable crust of ice, whose thickness, judging by the elevation above the surface of the ocean, can extend to 300 fathoms, counting from the lowest level at the sea depth, to the peak." Indeed, the marginal, peripheral part of the Antarctic ice sheet has an approximate height of 600 meters. However, judging by notes from January–February 1820, "research qualities refused Simonov to interpret what he saw, and a variety of ice, which differed both in form and origin, remained for him only ice." Koryakin even suggested that to a certain extent, the absence of sky luminaries during the midnight sun influenced Simonov's perception of the world. Simonov conclusions contracted with observations of officers Bellingshausen, Lazarev, Novosilsky and sailor Kiselev. Novosilsky and Bellingshausen even suggested their own classifications of Antarctic ice shields. On the report card of the expedition, each type of ice was indicated by conventional signs.

Besides, Simonov conducted ethnographic observations. More than 37 items from Oceanian islands are stored in the ethnographic museum of the Kazan Federal University. The collection includes tools, weapons, household utensils, jewellery, as well as samples of tapa cloth and linen from Ono island and New Zealand.

In 1963 Belov noticed the discrepancy between the scale of the expedition's achievements and the number of publications that followed on its results. Agreeing with Belov, Bulkeley concluded that scientific work in the Bellingshausen's expedition was not well thought out, equipped and financed, which consequently influenced the lack of sufficient publications on its matter.

== Historiography ==
=== Sources and historiography ===
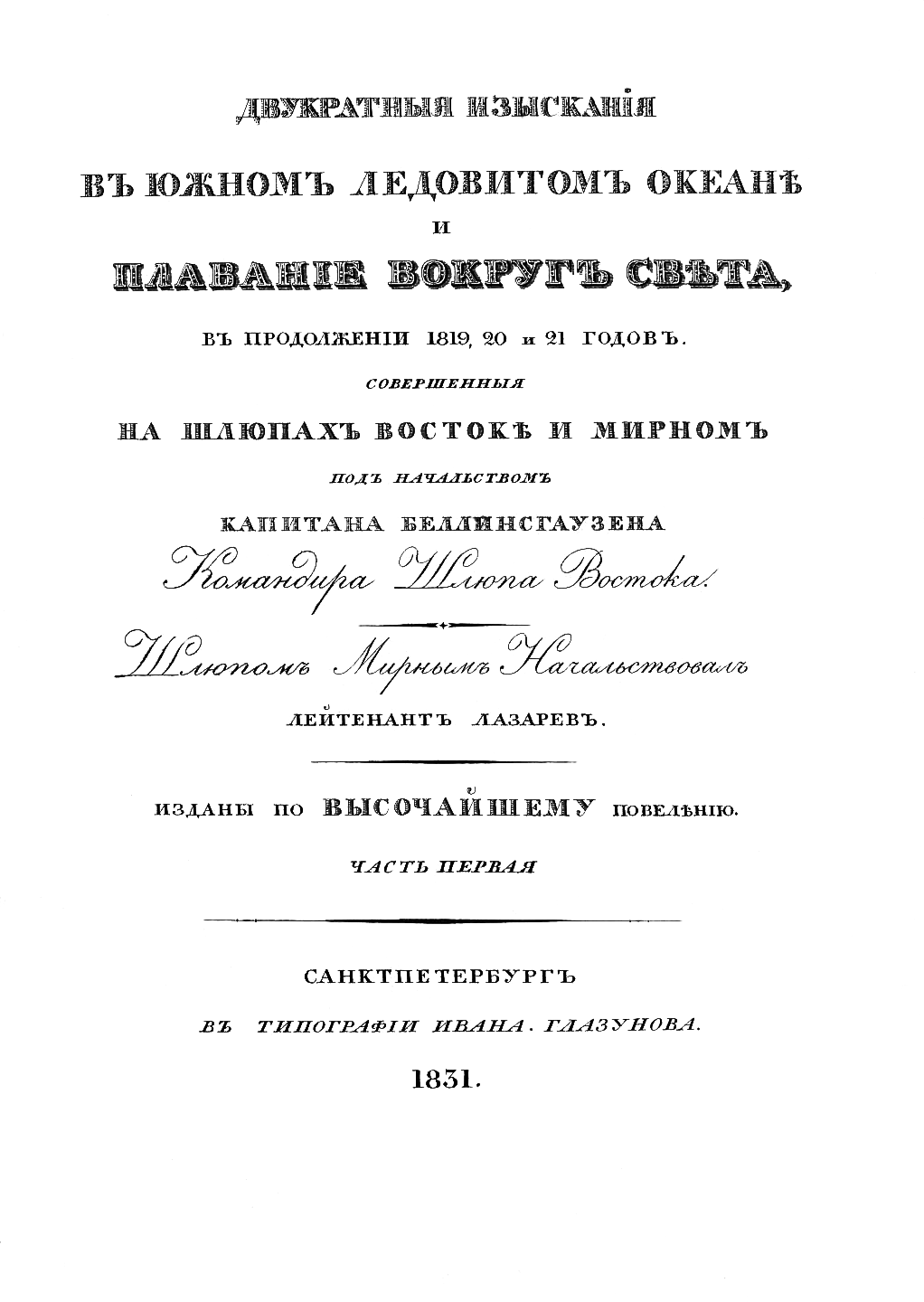
Title page of the first volume of Bellingshausen's description of the journey

By 1824, Bellingshausen finished his description of the expedition; ten pages manuscript was presented to the Admiralty department. After the coronation of Nicholas I of Russia, Bellingshausen submitted a request to allocate money for publishing 1200 samples of the book. However, his request was ignored. Only in 1827, newly established Navy Science and Technology Committee (Loggin Golenischev-Kutuzov was the head of it) supported Bellingshausen's request to publish at least 600 samples. The aim was to make the works public and to prevent the situation "when Bellingshausen’ discoveries (new lands, islands, lakes, and etcetera) because of being unknown, would serve the honour of foreign navigators, not ours". At the time when the decision was made, Bellingshausen was participating in the Russo-Turkish war on the Danube. Those responsible for publishing, changed the text as they wanted; this led to harsh criticism from Lazarev. Publishing costs constituted 38052 rubles (approximately 4000 pound sterlings), and the profit from the books was supposed to be sent to Bellingshausen. Description of the journey (2 volumes with atlas of maps and samples) was published in 1831 under the title "The journey of captain Bellingshausen in the Southern Arctic Ocean and around the world in the continuation of 1819, 1820, and 1821"(Russian: Двукратные изыскания в Южном Ледовитом океане и плавание вокруг света в продолжение 1819, 20 и 21 гг., совершенные на шлюпах «Востоке» и «Мирном» под начальством капитана Беллинсгаузена, командира шлюпа «Восток». Шлюпом «Мирным» начальствовал лейтенант Лазарев. This edition remains to be the primary source on the results of the first Russian Antarctic expedition because the original manuscript has not been preserved. The book had rapidly become a bibliographic rarity. For instance, August Heinrich Petermann in 1863 was able to find one doublet sample that was stored in the library of Grand Duke Konstantin Nikolayevich of Russia. Part of the official correspondence between Bellingshausen and Minister of the Sea Forces was published in 1821–1823 in journals "Syn otechestva" and "Zapiskah Admiraltejskogo departamenta".

Besides published and unpublished documents of Bellingshausen, important information is stored in the materials of expedition astronomer Simonov. Sent by the Kazan University, he was obliged to report about the expedition to school district trustee Mikhail Magnitsky. Part of the official correspondence and the Simonov's "Short report" (Russian: Краткий отчёт) was published in 1822 by "Kazansky vestnik". During his scientific career, Simonov was constantly returning to his expedition materials; however, he never finished its full description for a wider audience – his text '"Vostok" and "Mirny"' breaks off on a second visit to Australia. Simonov based his story on the published text "Dvukratnye izyskanija", supplementing it with extracts from his correspondence and diary. In 1903, Simonov's son gave the Kazan University 300 travel notes and bounded letters of his father; however, the diary was lost. Only in 1990 specialists of the USSR Black Sea Fleet and the Kazan University published Simonov' materials on his participation in the expedition. The volume included his assembly speech (Note: Assembly speech is the ritual genre of public speech, most fully represented in the speeches of university rectors, heads of scientific societies, and political figures, that is, persons vested with power.) of 1822 "A word on the sailing success of the sloops "Vostok" and "Murny" around the world and especially in the Southern Ocean in 1819, 1820, 1821 years" (Russian: «Слово об успехах плавания шлюпов „Востока“ и „Мирный“ около света и особенно в Южном Ледовитом море в 1819, 1820 и 1821 годах») (it was first reprinted in 1949 along with Kiselev's diary), and also Simonov' notes ‘"Vostok" and "Mirny"' from the Manuscript Department of the Kazan University Science Library. The location of the Simonov's scientific report remains to be unknown. In the Manuscript Department of the Russian State Library there is a noteworthy diary called by its author "The monument belongs to the sailor of the 1st article Yegor Kisilev" (Russian: «Памятник, принадлежит матрозу 1-й статьи Егору Кисилеву»). It was sold to one of the Yaroslavl bouquinistes and got preserved by a miracle. The diary was published in 1949.

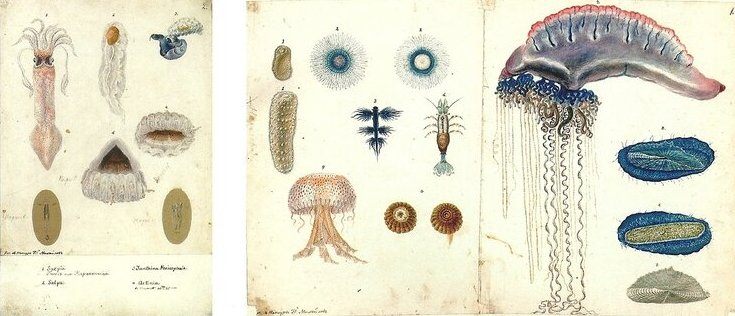
Marine invertebrates from the P. Mikhailov's album

Atlas of the journey included 19 maps, 13 different types of islands, 2 ice islands, and 30 different drawings. In 1949, the original sketching album of Pavel Mikhailov was discovered in the collection of the State Historical Museum. It consisted of 47 pages, where the author depicted types of islands, landscapes, portraits of local citizens. Taking into consideration that there was no naturalist on board, Mikhailov was trying his best to depict samples of flora and fauna, fixing each feather in birds or fish flakes. In 2012, the Russian Museum in Saint Petersburg published bilingual (Russian and English) edition of reproductions of 209 watercolours and drawings by Mikhailov that related to both the expedition of Bellingshausen and Lazarev, and to the expedition of Mikhail Staniukovich and Friedrich von Lütke that was aimed to discover the shores of the Bering Sea and the central part of the Pacific Ocean in 1826–1829. According to Bulkeley, who was the author of the first generic English-language research on Bellingshausen, the Russian Antarctic expedition was "in the information vacuum". Only in 1928 Yuly Shokalsky reanalyzed the report of the head of the expedition. The second edition of the "Dvukratnye izyskanija" was released only in 1949 edited by Evgeniy Sjvede; however, the volume was abbreviated; the 1960 edition was also abridged, but the nature of the exemptions was different. In 1963 Mikhail Belov first printed an expedition report card, consisting of 15 sheets. In the preface to this publication, it was stated that neither Bellingshausen's final report to the Ministry of the Sea Forces nor his initial report had ever been released. In 2014 Bulkeley noticed that without any particular reason, historiographic interest to the expedition had decreased. Generalized publications on the course and results of the expedition ceased to be issued, and Soviet and Western researchers focused on the private aspects of Russian visits to Australia and the Oceanian islands. In 1988–1992 Barratt (University of British Columbia) published a 4-volume monograph "'Russia and the South Pacific, 1696–1840".

The first time "Dvukratnye izyskanija" was translated to English in 1945 by famous British polar explorer Frank Debenham and was published in two volumes at the Hakluyt Society publishing house. In 2010, a facsimile edition was released. In 2008, the publishing house "Drofa" published a series of sources on the Russian Antarctic expedition. Besides the Bellingshausen's "Dvukratnye izyskanija", summary publication included Lazarev's letter addressed to N. Shestakov, diary of sailor Kiselev, abridged Simonov' notes and his "Word on success" (Russian: «Слово об успехах»), and also "From the notes of marine officer" (Russian: «Из записок морского офицера») by Novosilsky. Bulkeley published a review on this summary where he criticized its concept – it was only a repetition of Soviet publications and did not have any new critical standpoint. Bulkeley also pointed out many limitations of the publication, such as lack of Bellingshausen and Lazarev' biographies, summary map of the expedition, recount of dates following the Julian calendar, and obsolete measures, scientific bibliography, and other things). Thus, even in the 21st century, there is no published contemporary scientific volume with primary sources on the Bellingshausen and Lazarev expedition.

=== Interpretation of sources ===
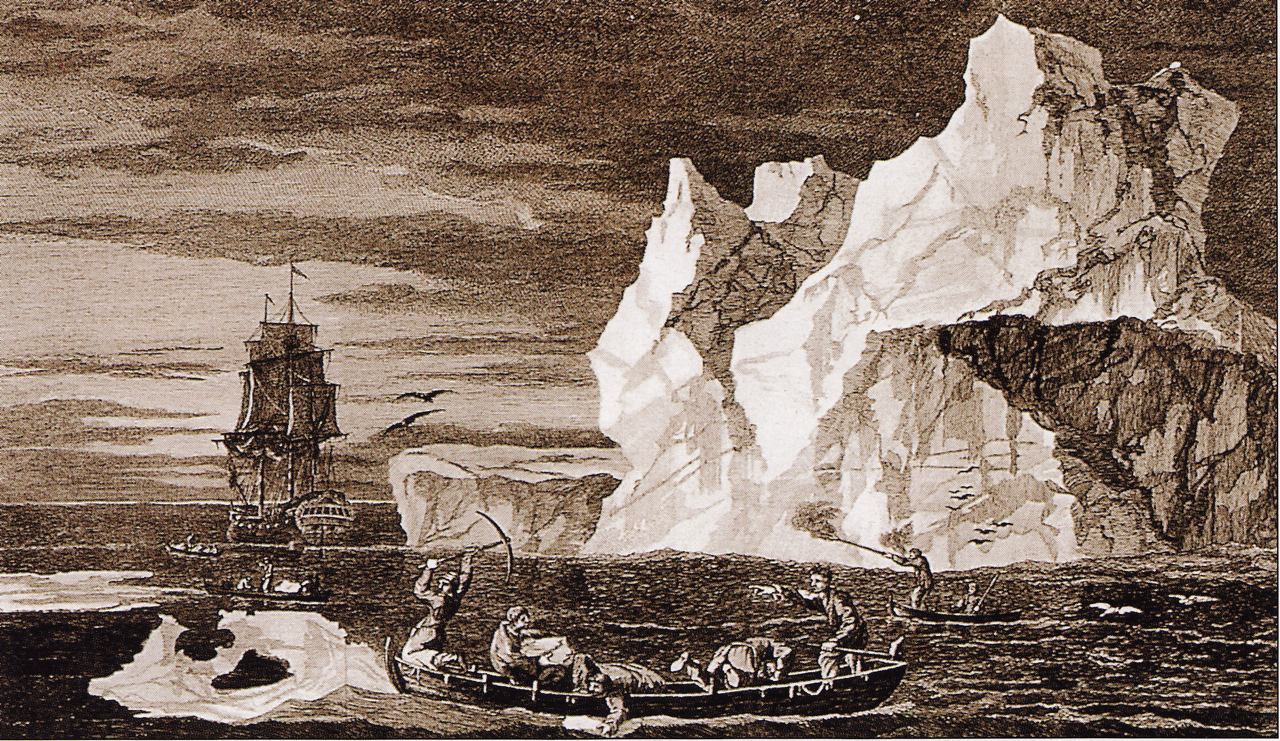
Sailors observe the island during the second James Cook's expedition. By William Hodges, 1773

Overall, there are six different descriptions of the journey and the most important discoveries, the authors of which were expedition participants and eyewitnesses of the events. For a long time, report that was sent in 1820 by Bellingshausen to Traversay from Australia, Lazarev's private letter that was written two months after the return to the homeland, and diary of sailor Kiselev which was filled with substantial breaks, remained in the status of manuscripts. The Simonov's journal of observations that depicted the events from 11 (23) December 1819 to March 25 (April 6) 1820, was promptly published – in terms of details, his later revised descriptions cannot be compared with. With a considerable delay, Bellingshausen's book was published. Novosilsky's description of the expedition came out 32 years after its completion. According to Bulkeley, none of the published works could be considered as reliable enough for restoring the expedition dating. For example, Kiselev's diary states that collision between "Mirny" and iceberg happened a week later than in the notes of Lazarev and Bellingshausen. Presumably, sailor filled his diary with a delay which is quite acceptable, taking into consideration the living and working conditions of the ordinary members of the expedition. If one takes into consideration descriptions of the events of January 1820, then out of six sources, only four are consistent. However, judging by the Lazarev's diary, observation of the main ice happened twenty days earlier than Bellingshausen, and Novosilsky noted. At the same time, there is a highly remarkable mistake in Lazarev's letter. He claimed that during the first expedition season there was no single loss, while three people died during the third and the last season. According to the official report on the personnel of the expedition that was compiled after the crew returned to Kronstadt, one sailor died from the disease on 9 (21) February 1820, while two others died on "Vostok" on 11 (23) May and 20 August (11 September) 1820. Lazarev also wrote about navigation mistakes made by Kotzebue, while contemporary coordinate measurements confirm data of Kotzebue and Bellingshausen. The same author was also inclined to speak vaguely about the time of certain events. In general, Lazarev' notes cannot be considered as a completely reliable source.

For both Russian and foreign scientists, one of the most challenging terms for interpretation is the phrase "materyi led" or "hard ice" (Russian: матёрой лёд) that was used by Lazarev and Bellingshausen in their descriptions. In the post-1949 Soviet literature, the term was interpreted as "ice continent". Moreover, in his report to Traversay from Australia in April 1820, Bellingshausen used the term "materik l'da " or "continent of ice" (Russian: континент льда). Tammiksaar argued that if navigators observed the ice shelf, they would not be able to understand and compare it with anything, since James Cook never faced with similar phenomena during his Antarctic expedition, while actual south polar glaciers were very different from the speculative hypothesis of Georges-Louis Buffon with which both Bellingshausen and Simonov were familiar with. Made by Bellingshausen ice descriptions, could be hardly adequately understood by his contemporaries. According to Koryakin, many of the passages from the report that Bellingshausen sent to Traversay, were much more understandable than texts from the 1831 edition that was subjected to literary editing. In the 1842 German version of the expedition description, interpreter skipped all descriptions of ice conditions, while in the English translation of 1915 phrase "materyi led" was translated as high icebergs or mother-icebergs, in contrast to the terms of Wilkes (verge of continental ice) or Ross (ice barrier). In his book, Bulkeley used the notion of "main ice" that was first introduced by John Ross and going back to Buffon's and Scoresby 's terminology. Bulkeley also argued that Simonov knew about Buffon's hypothesis, however, while sailing in the Antarctic waters, he was not interested in ice. After comparing Simonov' conclusions with statements of other officers and even sailors, Tammiksaar questioned the actual status of the astronomer in the expedition. Perhaps, officers never accepted him to their circle, and he did not have a right to vote during general discussions in the mess. Consequently, his own ideas did not find the response from other members of the expedition. According to Tammiksaar, neither Bellingshausen nor Lazarev and Novosilsky used the term "mainland" for referring to the continent but rather used it for emphasizing an indefinitely large area covered by ice; including ice mountains.

=== Question of priority in the discovery of Antarctica ===
==== Before 1948 ====
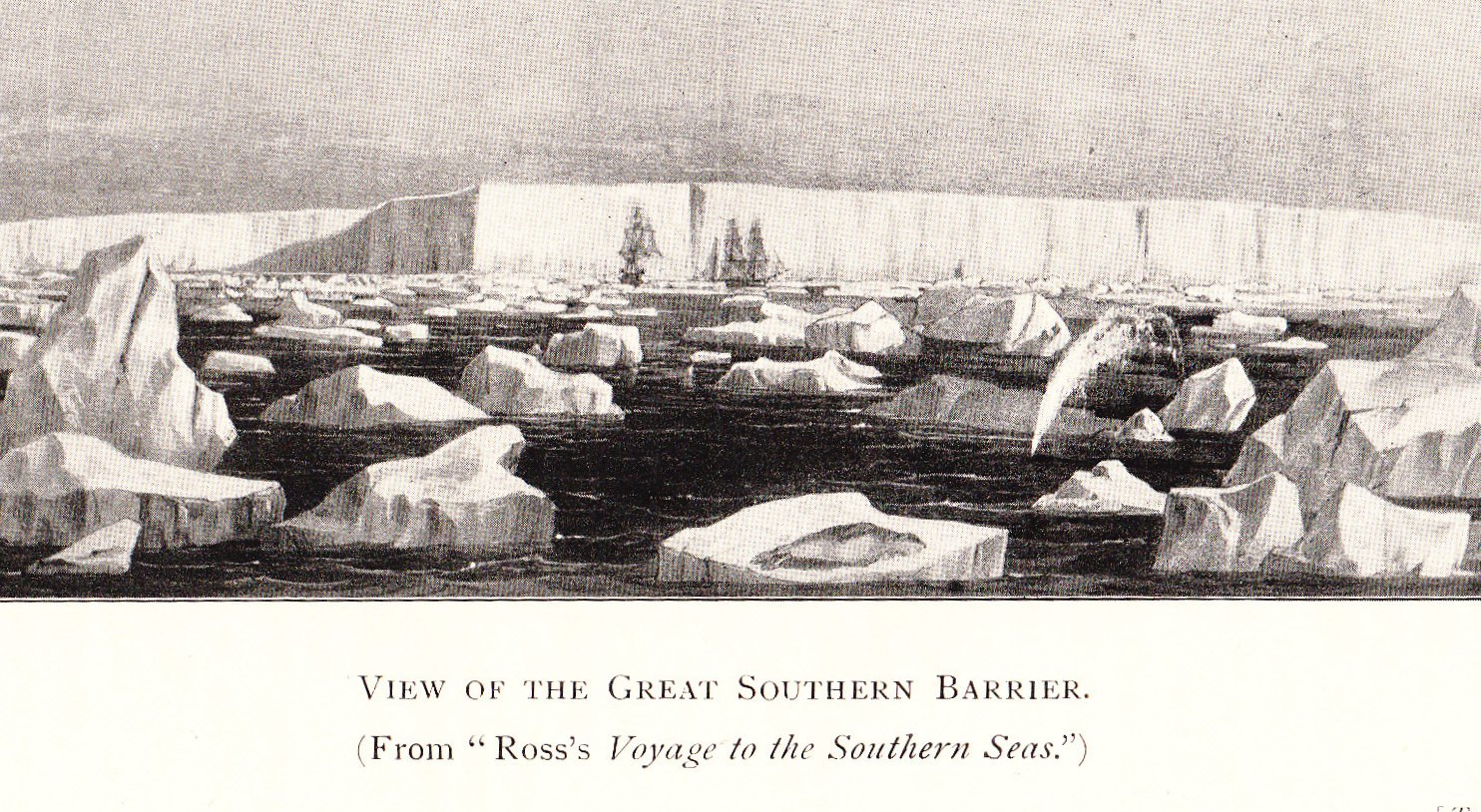
Ross Ice Shelf that was discovered by James Ross in 1841

Even though there were published expedition description by Bellingshausen and reports in German newspapers, the question of Russian priority in the discovery of Antarctica had not been raised until the first third of the 20th century. Only Novosilsky, when elected as a member of the Russian Geographical Society in 1855, claimed Russian priority in the discovery of Antarctica. That caused a sharp criticism from the president of the Society Friedrich von Lütke who emphasized that the expedition had no scientists, and after all European discoveries, scientific interest to Bellingshausen's legacy had decreased. Russian oceanographer Yuly Shokalsky shared the same view: that Bellingshausen's expedition did not lead to the discovery of Antarctica, and was not a stimulus for understanding this it as a continent.

By the beginning of the 20th century, the first Russian Antarctic expedition was almost forgotten. After returning from the Belgian Antarctic Expedition, navigator Frederick Cook made one of the first attempts to revive the memory of the Bellingshausen's voyage. In his article that was released in 1901, American navigator mentioned that "Bellingshausen and Lazarev honoured their country with first discoveries beyond the Antarctic Circle". However, at that time the Southern continent was not commercially attractive, thus, the question of priority remained to be discussed only in the academic circles. First publications on Antarctica appeared in the Soviet Union during the time of "Great Purge", thus even high ranked polar explorers such as Nikolay Urvantsev preferred to concentrate on describing Soviet success in the Antarctic. In the preface to the first edition of the book by Douglas Mawson "V strane purgi" (Chief Directorate of the Northern Sea Route publishing house, 1936) it was stated that the discovery of Antarctica was made by Jules Dumont d'Urville, James Clark Ross, and Charles Wilkes, while Bellingshausen and Lazarev only got to the polar waters.

From the other hand, in the 1920s Great Britain and the USA began striving to prove their priority in the discovery of Antarctica. According to Tammiksaar, for Britain, with its imperial status, it was impossible not to be considered as a power that discovered the continent (Spain discovered America, and the Netherlands – Australia). In the 1900-1910s, British did the most to study inland Antarctic areas. Charles Wilkes also declared himself the discoverer of the Southern continent, which was contested and criticized by Dumont d'Urville and Ross. In 1902, the version was published that Nathaniel Palmer could be the first who saw the Antarctic shores on November 17, 1820. In 1925, there was an attempt to assign the discovery of Antarctica to Edward Bransfield. During Americo-British discussions in the 1920-1930s, there were no question raised regarding the role of Russians. At the same time, when Hjalmar Riiser-Larsen in 1830 discovered the Princess Martha Coast that was initially described by Bellingshausen and Lazarev, nobody remembered about the expedition.

In connection with Norwegian annexation of Peter I Island and the United States' suggestions on collective sovereignty over the whole continent in the 1930s and 1940s, a debate broke out about the precedence of Bellingshausen and Lazarev in having discovered the Antarctic continent. This conflict acquired "hyperpolitical" character (following the notion of historian Erki Tammiksaar) during the Cold War. As a result, even in the 21st century, representatives of Russian, British, and American historiography have spoken both for and against Bellingshausen's priority. With increasing frequency, one can find statements in the literature that, in the period between 1819 and 1821, Bellingshausen, Edward Bransfield, and Nathaniel Palmer simultaneously discovered Antarctica. Bellingshausen met Palmer on the South Shetland Islands and even invited him aboard the sloop Vostok.

==== After 1948 ====
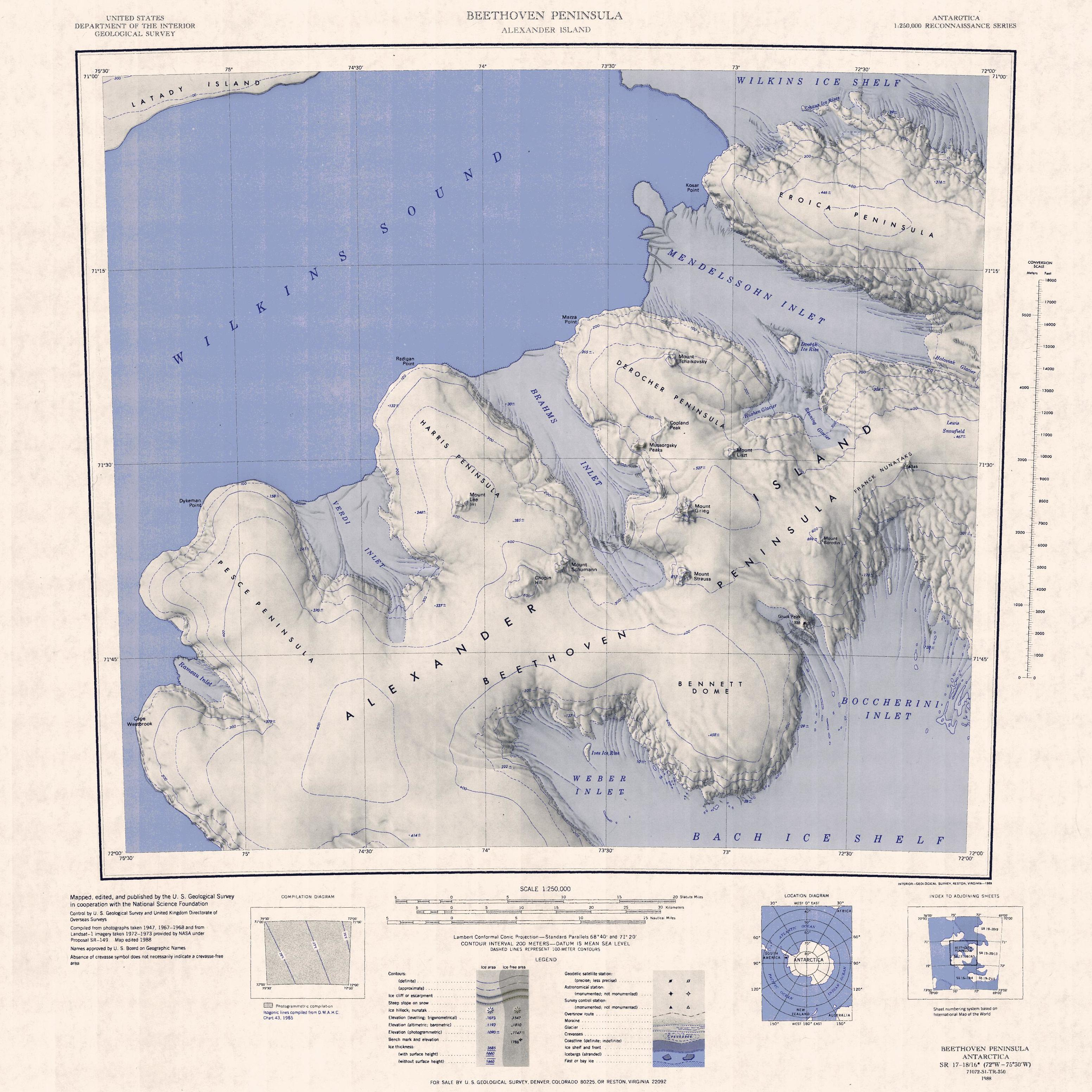
Map of the Alexander I Land compiled by United States Geological Survey and National Science Foundation, 1988

On August 9, 1948, discussion regarding the role of Russia in the discovery of Antarctica moved to a political dimension. At that day the USA officially urged countries that pretended on Antarctic territories (Argentina, Australia, Chile, France, New Zealand, Norway and Britain) to unite and create a condominium of eight powers. Soviet interests were not taken into consideration. On January 29, 1949, the Central Committee of the Communist Party of the Soviet Union decided to attract international attention to the Soviet claims to Antarctic territories. On February 10, 1949, Russian Geographical Society held a meeting where the president of the Society Lev Berg read the report. The following resolution, based on his speech, was very discreet. It stated that Russian sailors just "discovered in 1821 the Peter I Island, Alexander Island, Traversay Islands, and others". Thus, the question was raised regarding the Soviet development of Antarctica and scientific research on the discovery of the Ice Continent.

Extended English translation of Bellingshausen's description of the expedition was published in 1946 and edited by Frank Debenham – the director of the Scott Polar Research Institute. Starting from the 1920s, Debenham was investigating the Russian impact on the discovery of Antarctica. The scientist took an objective position and very highly praised the qualities of Russian officers in observing and researching. According to Tammiksaar, because of Debenham' editorial notes, Soviet researchers were able to investigate Bellingshausen' discoveries more thoroughly. Commenting on the notes of January 16 (28) 1820, Debenham mentioned that "this day can be counted as unsuccessful for the expedition" because the vessels were no further than 20 miles from the Princess Martha's coast. Few hours of good weather could have led to its discovery 110 years earlier than was done by Norwegians.

In 1947, Evgeniy Sjvede published a review on the book translation, and later it played a large role in the Soviet discussions of 1949. Sjvede and Berg emphasized James Cook' claims on the impossibility of reaching the extreme southern latitudes, and that the hypothetical Southern continent will never be discovered. The preface to "Dvukratnykh izyskanii" that was published in 1949 contained overt political accusations. Sjvede also referred to the observations made by Soviet whale hunters on flotilla “Slava”, matching them with notes by Bellingshausen, Lazarev and Novosilsky.

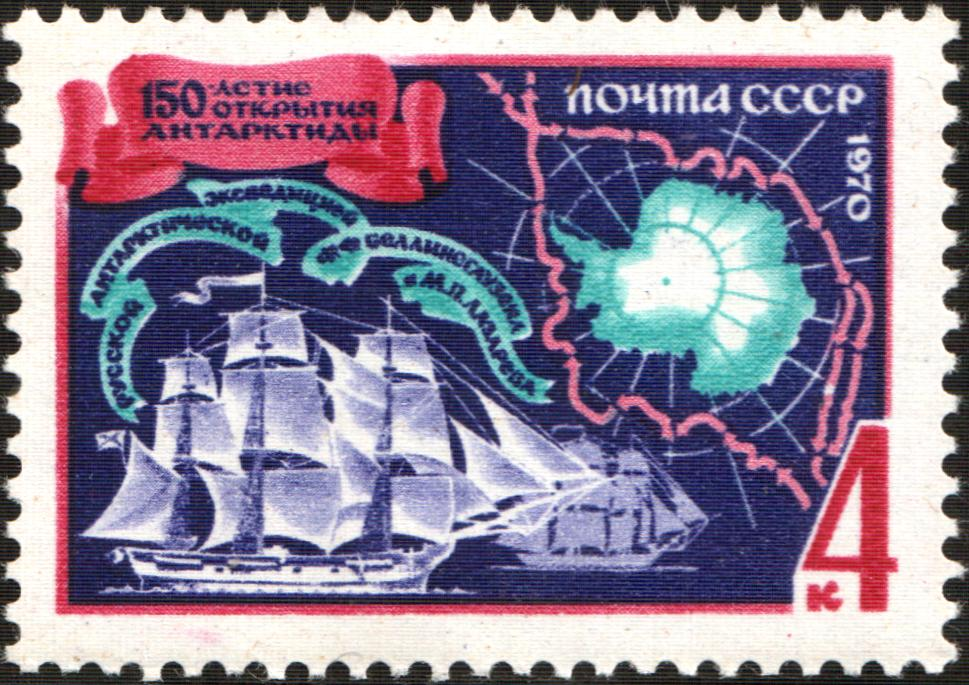
Soviet postal stamp commemorating the 150-year anniversary of the discovery of Antarctica, with a map of the Russian Antarctic expedition. (1970)

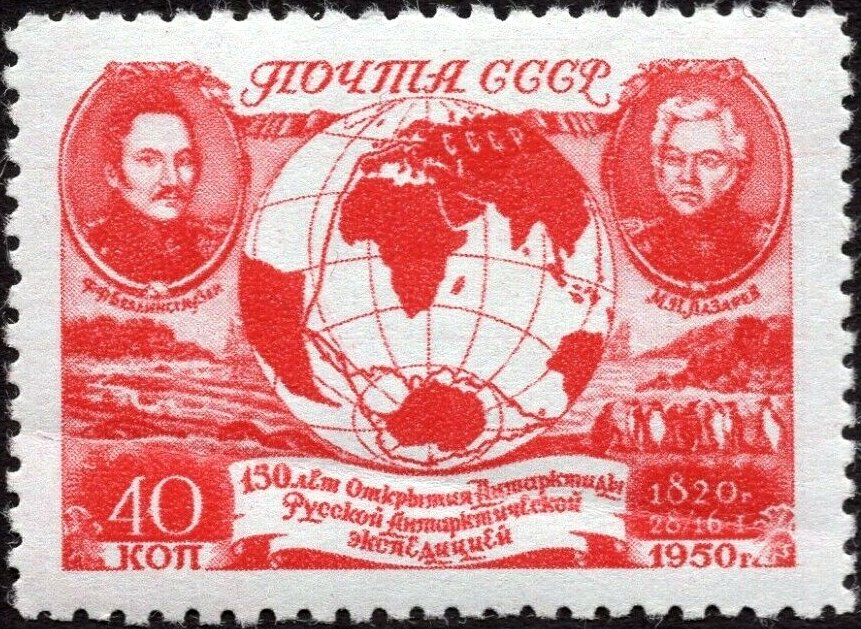

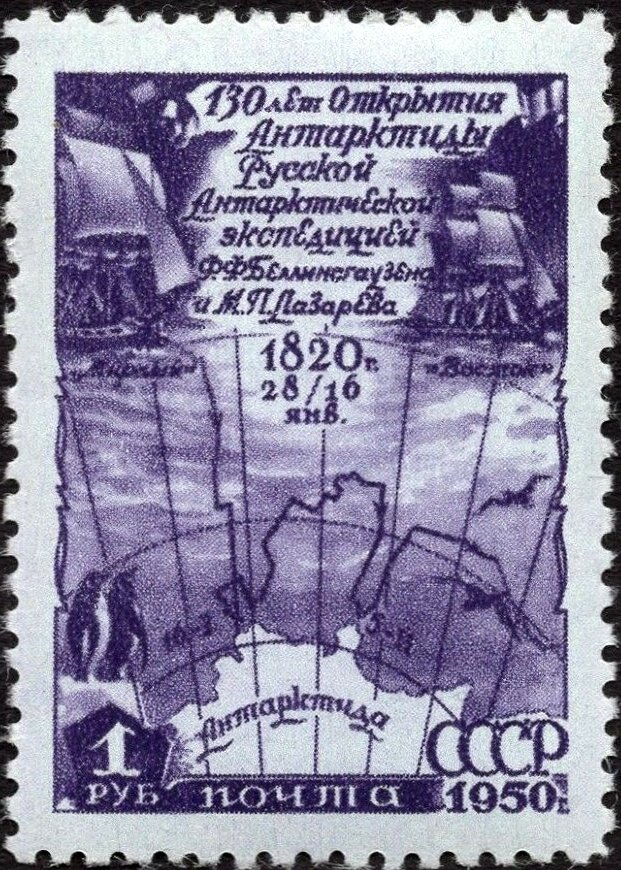
USSR postal stamps commemorating the expedition. (1950)

In 1961–1963, the famous historian of polar expeditions Mikhail Belov published a series of studies on the Bellingshausen's report card. Thus, the new primary source that proved the Russian priority over Antarctic lands was released. The map was presumably made by the expedition officers for the report to Traversay, or even to Alexander I. In the 1980-1990s, Belov's argumentation was accepted by foreign specialists. The map included 15 pages and had coloured remarks on different ice conditions. According to Belov, every time when Bellingshausen used the phrase "sploshnoi led" it actually meant that the expedition faced not with ordinary ice fields but with the shores of the Antarctic continent. As Bulkeley calculated, Bellingshausen described meetings with "sploshnoi led" 12 times, using this term 16 times in the reports, and around 33 times in his book. According to Belov, the expedition simultaneously opened the continent, and conducted an extended research on it. Conclusions of Belov were repeated in the book of Alexey Tryoshnikov, and in the research conducted by Vasilii Yesakov and Dmitrii Lebedev "Russian geographic discoveries and studies from ancient times to 1917" (Russian: «Русские географические открытия и исследования с древних времён до 1917 года») where the authors reproduced the map of the "ice shore" and ice classification compiled by Novosilsky.

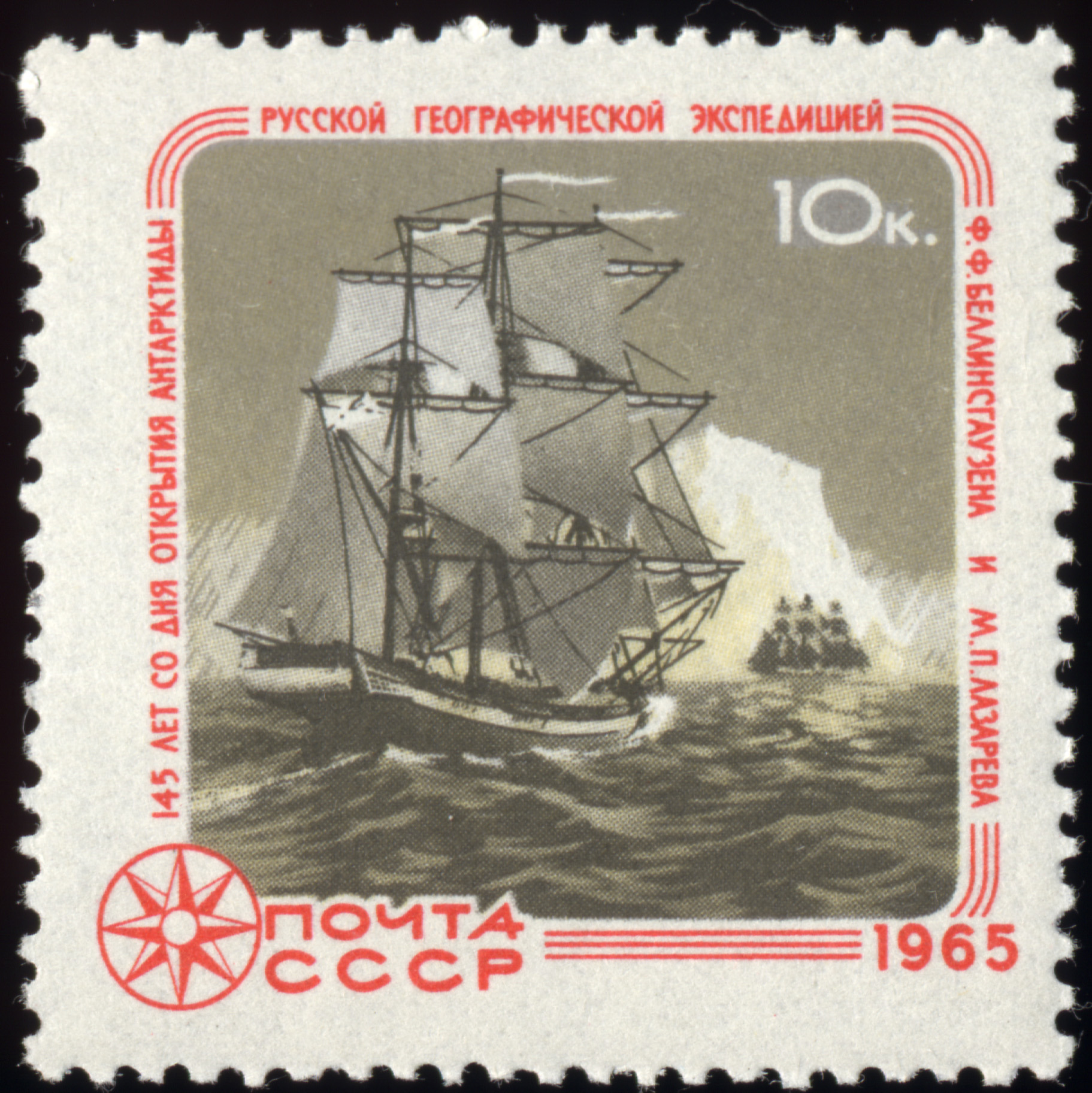
Vostok on Soviet postal stamp (1965)

This point of view became conventional in the Soviet and Russian historiography. In the "Ocherki po istorii geograficheskikh otkrytii" (Russian: «Очерках по истории географических открытий») by Iosif Magidovich and Vadim Magidovich the authors claimed (referring to the Lazarev's letter) that in January 1820 "Russians solved the problem that James Cook considered as impossible", and came less than 3 kilometres to the Princess Martha Shore. Consequently, the reporting map illustrated Ice Shelf that in 1960 was named after Lazarev. Describing the observations from January 15, 1821, Iosif and Vadim Magidovich claimed that Soviet scientists in the 1960s proved the Bellingshausen's right to the discovery of Antarctica since the discovered by him Alexander I Land is connected with the Antarctic Peninsula of George VI Ice Shelf. Following their interpretation, Bellingshausen's expedition reached Antarctic shores nine times, four times being as close as 13–15 km from the continent.

In 2008, glaciologist Koryakin wrote:

The main achievement of Russian sailors was in the summer of 1820–1821 and took place in Antarctic waters. The discovery of Alexander I Land and the island of Peter I was not disputed by anyone; it was recognized by everyone. Russian vessels reached these lands through the most glacial Antarctic seas. It is not a coincidence that the one of them (west of the Antarctic Peninsula) was later named after Bellingshausen.

==== In the 21st century ====
In the contemporary historiography, fundamental research on the events of the Bellingshausen and Lazarev' expedition and its interpretation in the Russian and Soviet science is conducted by Tammiksaar (Estonia), Bulkeley (Great Britain), and Ovlashchenko (Latvia). In 2014, Bulkeley published the first English-language book on the expedition, in which he ultimately stated that the expedition was poorly prepared. He also argued that Bellingshausen was not the first to observe the ice shelves of Antarctica. Earlier, in 2013, he published his conclusions in the Russian-language journal Voprosy istorii estestvoznaniia i tekhniki. His arguments could be summarized as the following:

- On February 7 (19), 1819, William Smith while sailing cargo on the English merchant vessel "The Williams" observed the South Shetland Islands that are part of the Antarctic continent. On January 18 (30) 1820, the crew of the same vessel under the command of Edward Bransfield in the presence of Smith observed the mainland Antarctica – Mount Bransfield in the very north of Antarctic Peninsula. Judging by the recorded evidence, Bransfield and Smith guessed that they observed the continent shore;
- Bellingshausen's crew observed land-like coastal ice shelves on February 5 (17), 1820. Lazarev claimed that it was on January 16 (28); however, Lazarev's data is incorrect and might appear because this day the expedition reached its southernmost point in the 1820 season.

Commenting on new evidence, Tammiksaar mentioned that involving the legacy of 19th century navigators in geopolitical arguments is "regrettable". His own point of view changed several times: if in the article for "Entsiklopedii Antarktiki" [Encyclopedia on Antarctica] (2007) he definitely claimed the Bellingshausen's priority in the discovery of the continent, then in his article (2016) on the reception (Note: society tactics on borrowing and adaptation certain sociological and cultural norms, principles and institutions that appeared in the different country or epoch) practices of the Russian Antarctic expedition, he mentioned meaninglessness of defining one single discoverer of Antarctica since perceptions of the geography of the south polar regions had completely changed. Contemporary debates on priorities in the discovery of Antarctica exist in coordinates of national proud and political antagonisms. This problem needs to be resolved by analogy with the Antarctic Treaty System.

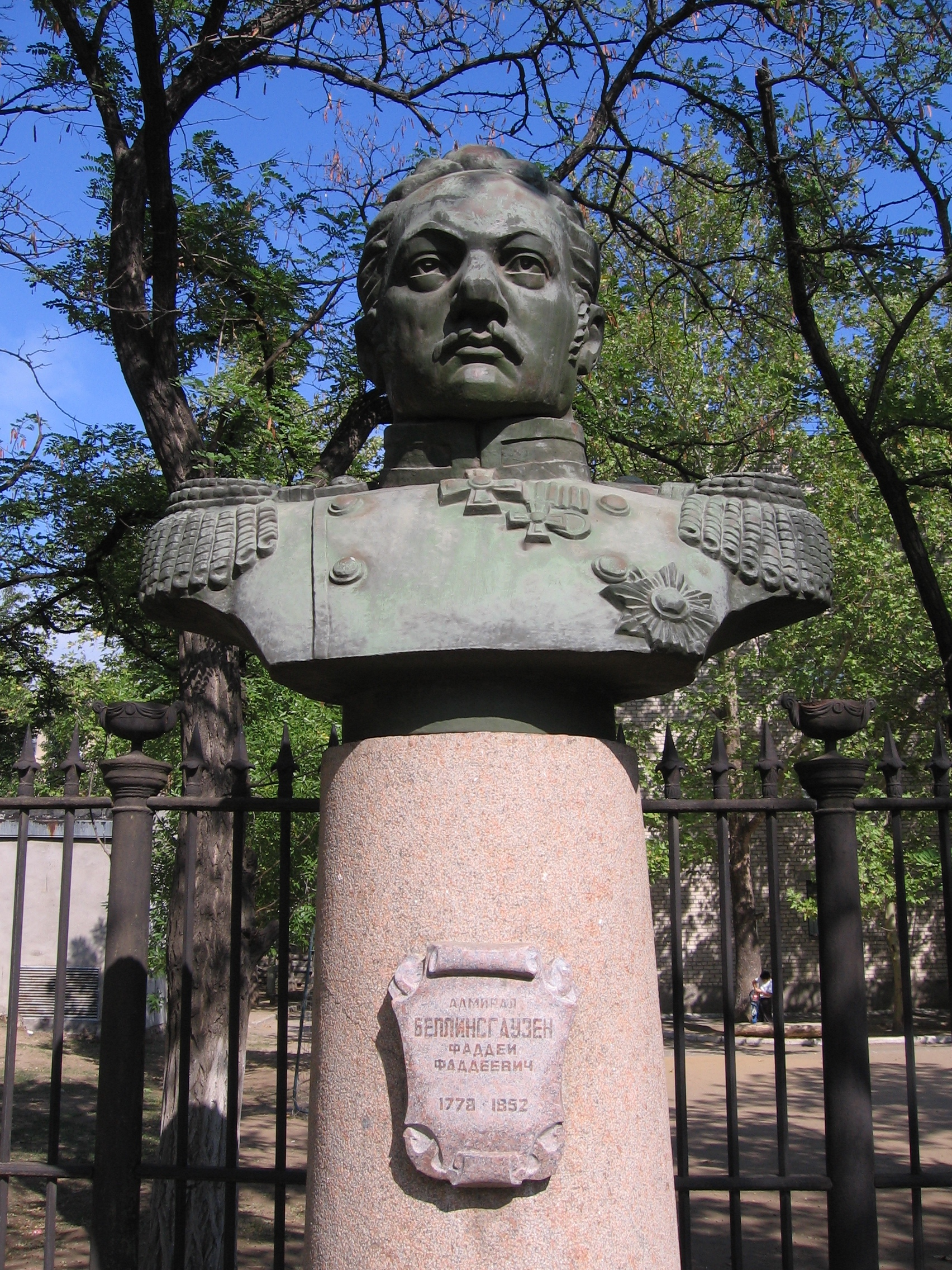
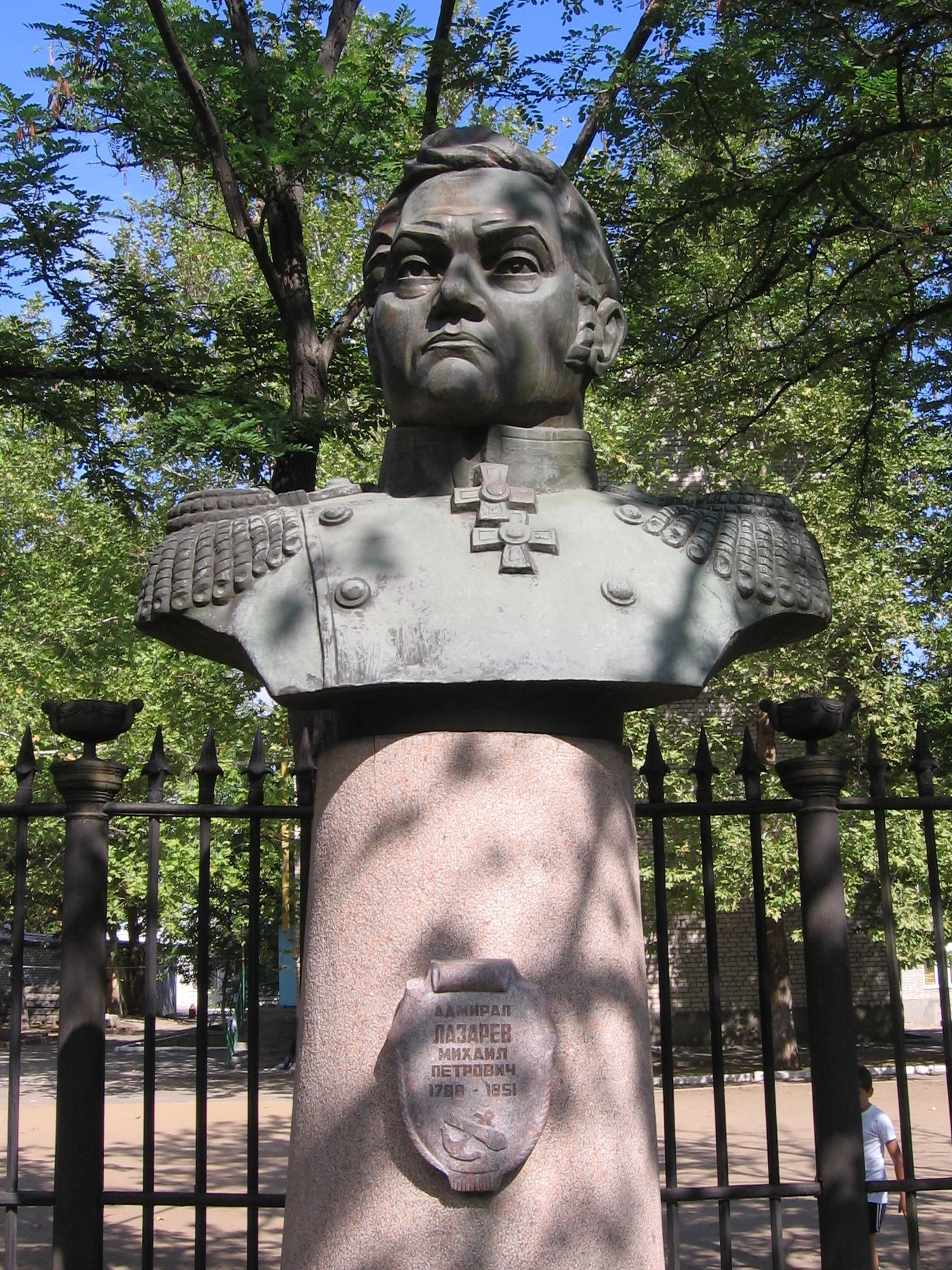
Busts of Bellingshausen and Lazarev in Mykolaiv, Ukraine

Bulkeley, supporting the position of the British priority, emphasized:

None of these navigators – Smith, Bransfield, Bellingshausen – never pretended that them with their crews in one fell swoop "discovered Antarctica." The author of this article also wants to avoid repeating unsubstantiated and poorly reasoned discussions of the last century. In his opinion, Antarctica revealed itself only collectively, slowly and gradually… The chronology of these laborious steps is simply factual. It has no significance for the present and future actions of Russia, Great Britain or any other country in the Antarctic.

Ovlashchenko, who was a specialist in the admiralty law (an associated member of the Baltic International Academy, Riga) published three books on the discoveries of Antarctica in Russian and Soviet historiography in the pre-1960s period. He consistently criticized both Bulkeley and Tammiksaar. Bulkeley negatively reviewed his first book "Continent of Ice" (Russian: «Материк льда»), also because it was published in the Palmarium Academic Publishing. I. Gan also reviewed it, but quite sympathetically. One of the reasons for a harsh criticism was that Ovlashchenko based on the large source material was aiming to demonstrate consistent usage of the Antarctic question in the geopolitical confrontation of the 1940-1950s, and conscious silencing of the Russian rights to Antarctica. From the other hand, he illustrated that Soviet researches had exceptionally various visions on the issue.

== Sources ==
Primary sources

- T. H. Baughman (1999). Pilgrims on the Ice: Robert Falcon Scott's First Antarctic Expedition. University of Nebraska Press. ISBN 0-8032-1289-5.
- Cook, James (1948). Путешествие к Южному полюсу и вокруг света. Moscow: Государственное издательство географической литературы.
- Атлас к путешествию капитана Беллинсгаузена в Южном Ледовитом океане и вокруг света в продолжении 1819, 1820 и 1821 годов. Санкт-Петербург. 1831. pp. 4, 64.
- Беллинсгаузен Ф. Ф. (1949). Двукратные изыскания в Южном Ледовитом океане и плавание вокруг света в продолжение 1819, 20 и 21 годов, совершенные на шлюпах "Востоке" и "Мирном" под начальством капитана Беллинсгаузена командира шлюпа "Восток". Шлюпом "Мирным" начальствовал лейтенант Лазарев (in Russian). Moscow: Географгиз.
- Беллинсгаузен Ф. Ф. (2008). Двукратные изыскания в Южном Ледовитом океане и плавание вокруг света (in Russian). Moscow: Дрофа. ISBN 978-5-358-02961-3.
- Галкин Н. (1822). "Письма г. Галкина о плавании шлюпов Востока и Мирного в Тихом Океане" (in Russian). No. XLIX. Сын отечества: исторический и политический журнал. pp. 97–170.
- В. В. Аристов (1990). Два плавания вокруг Антарктиды. Рус. экспедиция Ф. Ф. Беллинсгаузена, М. П. Лазарева, 1819–1821 гг. и сов. экспедиция, 1982—1983 гг (in Russian). Казань: Изд-во Казан. ун-та. ISBN 5-7464-0111-0.
- Ирина Афанасьева (2012). Павел Михайлов, 1786–1840. Путешествия к Южному полюсу. науч. рук. Е. Петрова. СПб: Palace Editions. ISBN 978-5-93332-416-4.
- Белов (1963). Первая русская антарктическая экспедиция 1819–1821 гг. и её отчётная навигационная карта (in Russian). Л.: Морской транспорт.
- "Прибытие капитана Беллинсгаузена и лейтенанта Лазарева от Южного Полюса" (in Russian). Vol. 2, no. 7. Отечественные записки. 1821. pp. 233–242.
- Симонов И. М. (1824). "Известие о путешествии капитана (ныне капитан-командора) Беллинсгаузена в 1819, 1820 и 1821 годах по Тихому океану и Южным Ледовитым морям" (in Russian). Vol. VII, no. 19. Северный архив. pp. 24–46.
- Debenham, Frank, ed. (1945). The Voyage of Captain Bellingshausen to the Antarctic Seas, 1819–1821. London: Printed for the Hakluyt Society. OCLC 492608378.

Articles and monographs

- Балкли Рип (Англия) (2013). "Первые наблюдения материковой части Антарктиды: попытка критического анализа". No. 4. Вопросы истории естествознания и техники. pp. 41–56. Archived from the original on 2022-09-12.
- Ган И. Л. (2015). "Рецензия на книгу А. В. Овлащенко «Материк льда. Первая русская антарктическая экспедиция и ее отражение в советской историографии (1920–е — 1940–е годы)". Zhiznʹ Zemli. No. 37. Жизнь Земли. pp. 207–211. ISSN 0514-7468.
- Лебедев Д. М.; Есаков В. А. (1971). Русские географические открытия и исследования с древних времен до 1917 года. Moscow: Мысль.
- Магидович И. П. (1985). Очерки по истории географических открытий. Moscow: Просвещение. pp. 26–30.
- Овлащенко А. (2013). Материк льда. Первая русская антарктическая экспедиция и её отражение в советской историографии (1920–е – 1940–е годы). Саарбрюкен: Palmarium Academic Publishing. ISBN 978-3-659-98556-0.
- Овлащенко А. (2014). Антарктический рубикон. Тема открытия Антарктиды в советских источниках начала 50-х годов. Саарбрюкен: Palmarium Academic Publishing. ISBN 978-3-639-88611-5.
- Овлащенко А. (2016). Антарктический ренессанс. Проведение первых Комплексных антарктических экспедиций и проблема открытия Антарктиды (1955–1960 гг.). Palmarium Academic Publishing. ISBN 978-3-659-60422-5.
- Смирнов, Александр (June 17, 2015). "Мореплаватели-священники. Как иеромонахи совершали подвиги" [Seafarers-priests. How hieromonks performed feats]. AiF (in Russian). Аргументы и Факты.
- Трёшников А. Ф. (1963). История открытия и исследования Антарктиды (in Russian). М.: Географгиз.
- Шокальский Ю. М. (1928). "Столетие со времени отправления русской антарктической экспедиции под командою Ф. Беллинсгаузена и М. Лазарева 4 июля 1819 г. из Кронштадта". Vol. 60, no. 2. Известия Русского географического общества. pp. 175–212.
- Шведе, E. E. [in Russian] (1960). Открытие Антарктиды русскими мореплавателями в 1819 – 1821 г.г. Восточная литература.
- Barratt G (1981). Russia in Pacific waters, 1715–1825. London and Vancouver: University of British Columbia Press. ISBN 0-7748-0117-4.
- Barratt G. (1988a). Russia and the South Pacific, 1696–1840. Vancouver: The University of British Columbia Press. ISBN 0-7748-0291-X.
- Barratt G. (1988b). Russia and the South Pacific, 1696–1840. Vancouver: The University of British Columbia Press. ISBN 0-7748-0305-3.
- Barratt G. (1992). Russia and the South Pacific, 1696–1840. Vancouver: The University of British Columbia Press. ISBN 0-7748-0409-2.
- Bulkeley R. (2012). "Dvukratnye izyskaniya v yuzhnom lyedovitom okeane i plavaniye vokrug sveta v prodolzheniye 1819, 1820, i 1821 godov [Two seasons of exploration in the Antarctic ocean and a circumnavigation, during the years 1819, 1820, and 1821]". Vol. 48, no. 4. Polar Record.
- Bulkeley R. (2013a). "Bellingshausen's first accounts of his Antarctic voyage of 1819–1821". Vol. 49, no. 1. Polar Record. pp. 9–25.
- Bulkeley R. (2013b). "Pavel Mikhailov 1786–1840: Voyages to the South Pole POLE". Vol. 49, no. 2. St. Petersburg: Polar Record. p. 1.
- Bulkeley R. (2013c). "Pictures from an Antarctic expedition: Mikhailov on the Bellingshausen voyage". Vol. 49. Polar Record. pp. 409–412.
- Bulkeley R. (2013d). "Materik l'da: pervaya russkaya antarkticheskaya ekspeditsiya i yeyë otrazheniye v sovetskoi istoriografii (1920-e – 1940-e gody) [Continent of Ice: the first Russian Antarctic Expedition and its footprint in Soviet historiography from the 1920s to the 1940s. Aleksandr Ovlashchenko. 2013. Saarbrücken: Palmarium, 307 p., softcover. ISBN 978-3-659-98556-0]". Vol. 51. Polar Record. p. 1.
- Bulkeley R. (2014). Bellingshausen and the Russian Antarctic Expedition, 1819—21. New York: Palgrave Macmillan. ISBN 978-1-349-59576-1.
- Bulkeley R. (2015). "The Bellingshausen-Palmer meeting". Vol. 51, no. 6. Polar Record. pp. 644–654.
- Burton R. (2016). "Review on: Bellingshausen and the Russian antarctic expedition, 1819–21". Vol. 52, no. 5. Polar Record. pp. 614–615.
- Сирый С. П. (n.d.). "Кругосветное плавание капитана 2 ранга Ф. Ф. Беллинсгаузена и лейтенанта М. П. Лазарева на шлюпах "Восток" и "Мирный" и открытие Антарктиды (Посвящается 190-летию со дня открытия Антарктиды)" (PDF). Российский государственный архив военно-морского флота (РГАВМФ). Archived from the original (PDF) on 2019-04-20.
- Cook F. A. (1901). "Captain Fabian Gottlieb Von Bellingshausen, 1819–1821. The Discovery of Alexander I., Peter I., and Other Islands". Vol. 33, no. 1. Bulletin of the American Geographical Society. pp. 36–41.
- Landis M. (2001). Antarctica : exploring the extreme : 400 years of adventure. Chicago Review Press. pp. 395. ISBN 1-55652-428-5.
- Löwe, Ferdinand (1842). "Bellingshausens Reise nach der Südsee und Entdeckungen im südlichen Eismeer" (in German). No. 2. Archiv für wissenschaftliche Kunde von Russland. pp. 125–174.
- Mills W. J. (2003). Exploring polar frontiers : a historical encyclopedia. Santa Barbara, CA: ABC-CLIO. pp. 77–79. ISBN 1-57607-422-6.
- Simpson-Housley P. (1992). Antarctica: exploration, perception and metaphor. L.: Routledge. ISBN 0-415-08225-0.
- Tammiksaar E. (2007). Encyclopedia of the Antarctic. New York; London: Routledge, Taylor & Francis. pp. 138–139, 823–825. ISBN 9780415970242.
- Tammiksaar E.; Kiik T. (2013). "Origins of the Russian Antarctic expedition: 1819–1821". Vol. 49, no. 2. Polar Record. pp. 180–192.
- Tammiksaar E. (2016). "The Russian Antarctic Expedition under the command of Fabian Gottlieb von Bellingshausen and its reception in Russia and the world". Vol. 52, no. 5. Polar Record. pp. 578–600.
