= Oregon boundary dispute =

Early 19th century US–UK boundary dispute

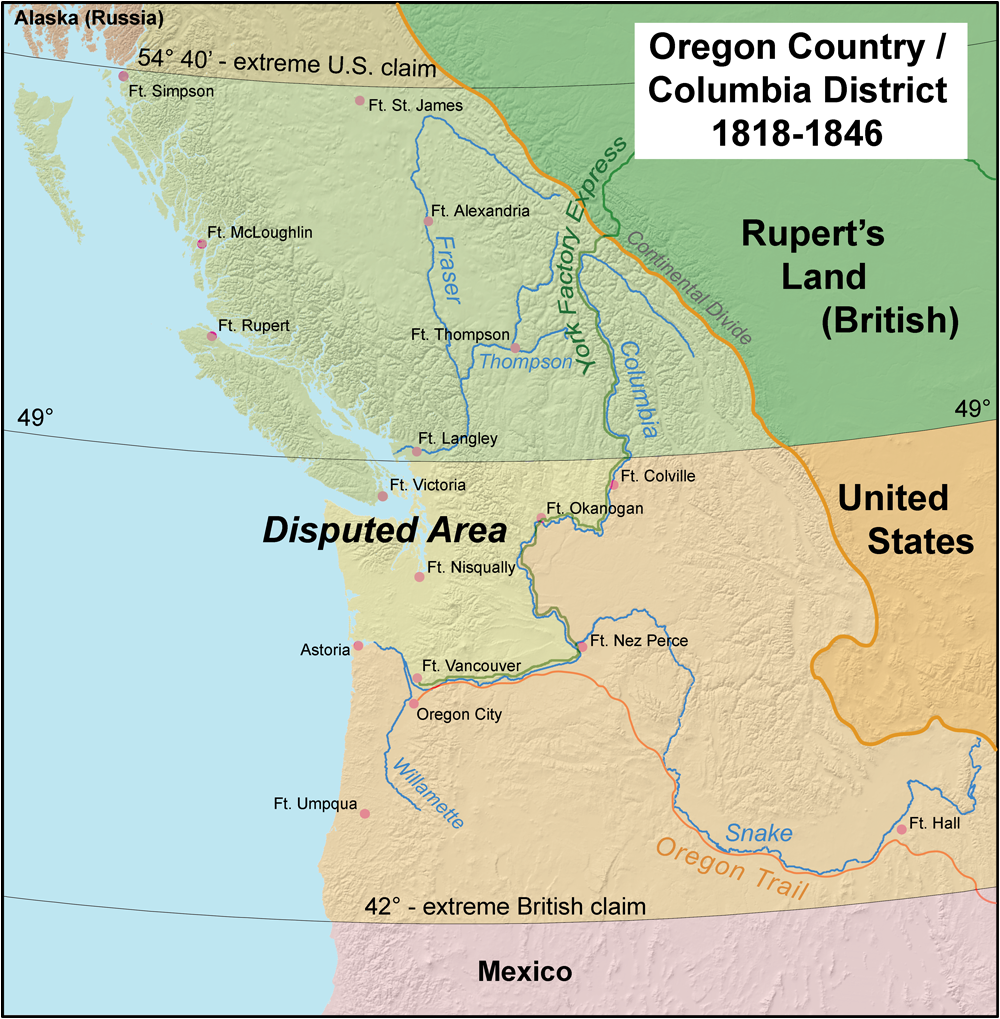
The Oregon Country/Columbia District stretched from 42°N to 54°40′N. The most heavily disputed portion is highlighted.

The Oregon boundary dispute or the Oregon Question was a 19th-century territorial dispute over the political division of the Pacific Northwest of North America between several nations that had competing territorial and commercial aspirations in the region.

Expansionist competition into the region began in the 18th century, with participants including the Russian Empire, Great Britain, Spain, and the United States. After the War of 1812, the Oregon dispute took on increased importance for diplomatic relations between the British Empire and the fledgling American republic. In the mid-1820s, the Russians signed the Russo-American Treaty of 1824 and the Russo-British Treaty of 1825, and the Spanish signed the Adams–Onís Treaty of 1819, by which Russia and Spain formally withdrew their respective territorial claims in the region, and the British and the Americans acquired residual territorial rights in the disputed area.

However the question of sovereignty over a portion of the North American Pacific coast was still contested between the United Kingdom and the United States. The disputed area was defined as the region west of the Continental Divide of the Americas, north of Mexico's Alta California border of 42nd parallel north, and south of Russian America at parallel 54°40′ north. The British generally called this region the Columbia District and the Americans generally called it Oregon Country.

During the 1844 United States presidential election campaign, the Democratic Party proposed ending the Oregon Question by annexing the entire area. The U.S. Whig Party, in contrast, evinced no interest in the question – due, some scholars have claimed, to the Whig view that it was unimportant compared to other domestic problems. The Democratic candidate, James K. Polk, invoked the popular theme of manifest destiny and appealed to voters' expansionist sentiments in pressing for annexation, and defeated the Whig candidate, Henry Clay. Polk then sent the British government an offer to agree on a partition along the 49th parallel (which had been previously offered).

However, the resulting negotiations soon faltered: the British still pressed for a border along the Columbia River. Tensions grew as American expansionists, such as Senator Edward A. Hannegan of Indiana and Representative Leonard Henly Sims of Missouri, urged Polk to annex the entire Pacific Northwest all the way to the 54°40′ parallel north (which is what the Democrats had called for during the presidential campaign). These tensions gave rise to slogans such as "Fifty-four Forty or Fight!" At the same time, U.S. relations with the Centralist Republic of Mexico were rapidly deteriorating as a result of the recent U.S. annexation of Texas. This gave rise to a concern that the U.S. might have to fight two wars on two fronts at the same time. Thus, just before the outbreak of the Mexican–American War, Polk retreated to his earlier position, calling for the Oregon border to run along the 49th parallel.

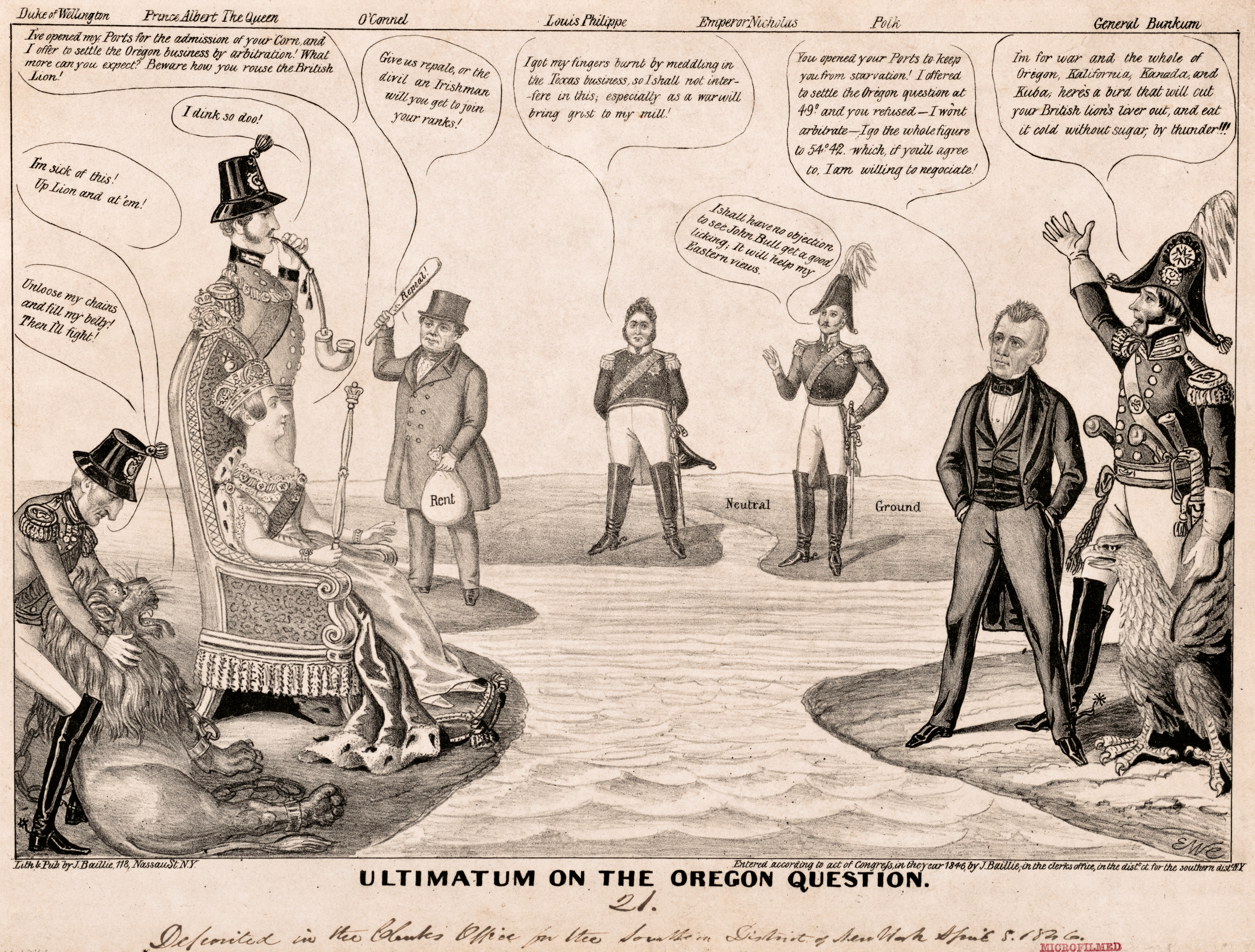
Ultimatum on the Oregon question, 1846 cartoon

The 1846 Oregon Treaty established the border between British North America and the United States along the 49th parallel until the Strait of Georgia, where the marine boundary curved south to exclude Vancouver Island and the Gulf Islands from the United States. As a result, a small portion of the Tsawwassen Peninsula, Point Roberts, became an exclave of the United States.

Vague wording in the treaty left the ownership of the San Juan Islands in doubt, as the division was to follow "through the middle of the said channel" to the Strait of Juan de Fuca. Only HBC seemed concerned about the San Juan Islands. At the time negotiations took place for the 1846 Treaty, the HBC Governor wrote to Britain’s negotiator, the Foreign Secretary of State Earl of Aberdeen, instructing him to use the Rosario Strait as the water boundary line. Despite these instructions, the result of the negotiations intentionally resulted in vague wording and determined the boundary as the 49th parallel, turning south at the middle of the channel separating Vancouver Island from the continent, then heading west down the middle of the Strait of Juan de Fuca to the Pacific Ocean. Since there are two straits which could be argued to be the dividing line (the Haro and the Rosario), this meant the San Juan Islands could be, and quickly were, claimed by both.

During the so-called Pig War, both nations agreed to a joint military occupation of the islands. Kaiser Wilhelm I of the German Empire was selected as an arbitrator to end the dispute, with a three-man commission ruling in favor of the United States in 1872. There the Haro Strait became the borderline, rather than the British-favored Rosario Strait. The border established by the Oregon Treaty and finalized by the arbitration in 1872 remains the boundary between the United States and Canada in the Pacific Northwest.

== Background ==
The Oregon Question originated in the 18th century during the early European or American exploration of the Pacific Northwest. Various empires began to consider the area suitable for colonial expansion, including the Americans, Russians, Spanish and British. Naval captains such as the Spanish Juan José Pérez Hernández, British George Vancouver and American Robert Gray gave defining regional water formations like the Columbia River and the Puget Sound their modern names and charted them in the 1790s. Overland explorations were commenced by the British Alexander Mackenzie in 1792 and later followed by the American Lewis and Clark expedition, which reached the mouth of the Columbia River in 1805.

These explorers often claimed in the name of their respective governments sovereignty over the Northwest Coast. The knowledge of fur-bearing animal populations like the California sea lion, North American beaver and the Northern fur seal were used to create an economic network called the maritime fur trade. The fur trade would remain the main economic interest that drew Euro-Americans to the Pacific Northwest for decades. Merchants exchanged goods for fur pelts along the coast with indigenous nations such as the Chinookan people, the Aleuts and the Nuu-chah-nulth.

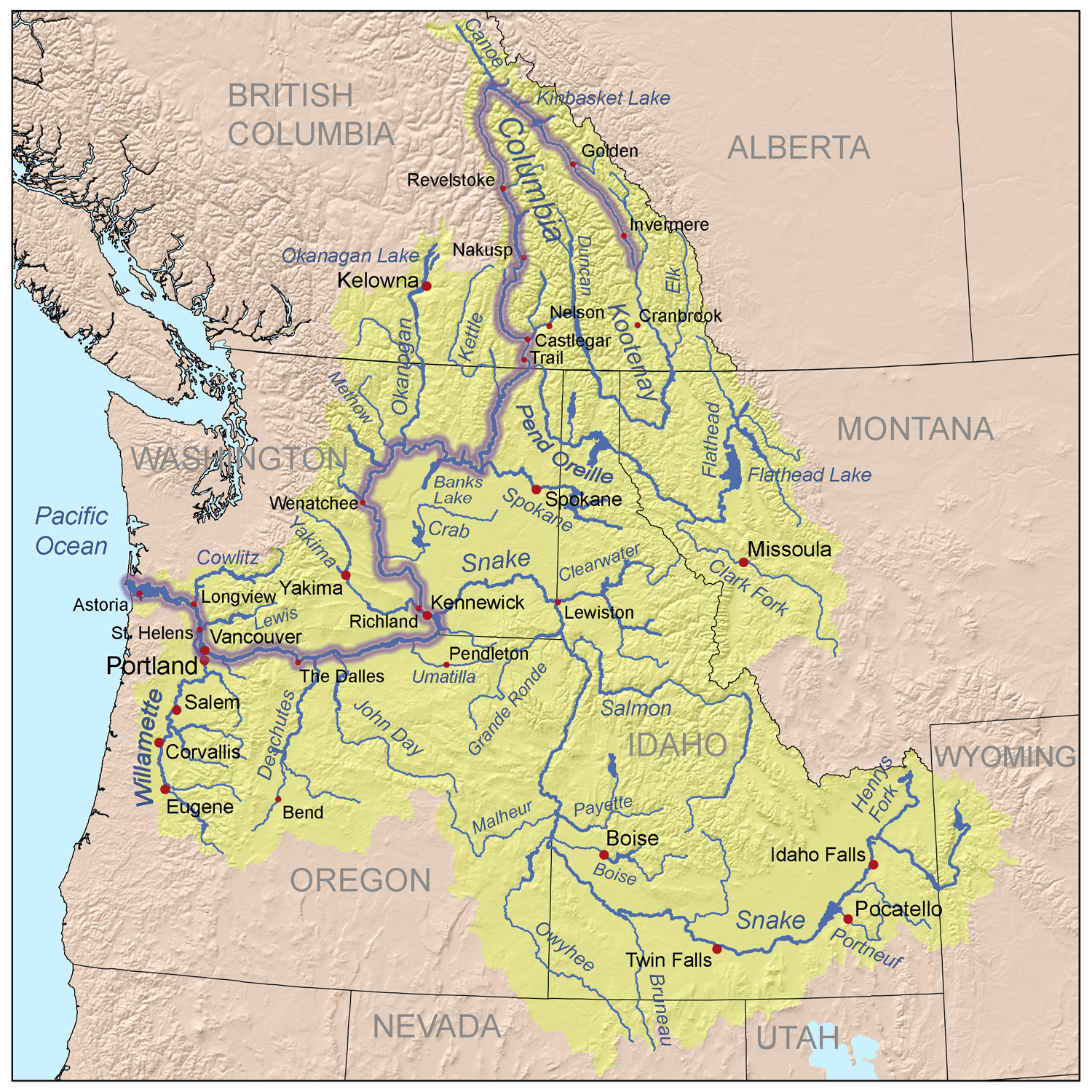
Map of the Columbia River and its tributaries, showing modern political boundaries and cities.

=== Spanish colonization ===
A series of expeditions to the Pacific Northwest were financed by the Spanish to strengthen their claims to the region. Creating a colony called Santa Cruz de Nuca on Vancouver Island, the Spanish were the first European colonisers of the Pacific Northwest outside Russian America to the north. A period of tensions with the United Kingdom, called the Nootka Crisis, arose after the Spanish seized a British vessel. However the three Nootka Conventions averted conflict, with both countries agreeing to protect their mutual access to Friendly Cove against outside powers. While the Spanish colony was abandoned, a border delineating the northern reaches of New Spain was not included. Despite the Nootka Conventions still allowing the Spanish to establish colonies in the region, no more attempts were made as other geopolitical and domestic matters drew the attention of the authorities. With the Adams–Onís Treaty of 1819, the Spanish formally withdrew all formal claims to lands north of the 42° north.

=== Russian interest ===
The Imperial Russian government established the Russian-American Company in 1799, a monopoly among Russian subjects for fur trading operations in Russian America with the Ukase of 1799. In part from the growing Russian activities to the north, the Spanish created the Catholic Missions to create colonies in Alta California. Plans for creating Russian colonies in what became the modern American states of Washington and Oregon were formulated by Nikolai Rezanov. He aimed to relocate the primary colony of Russian America to the entrance of the Columbia River, but was unable to enter the river in 1806 and the plan was abandoned.

In 1808 Alexander Andreyevich Baranov sent the Nikolai, with the captain "ordered to explore the coast south of Vancouver Island, barter with the natives for sea otter pelts, and if possible discover a site for a permanent Russian post in the Oregon Country." The ship wrecked on the Olympic Peninsula and the surviving crew did not return to New Archangel for two years. The failure of the vessel to find a suitable location led to the Russians to not consider much of the Northwest coast worth colonizing. Their interest in the Puget Sound and the Columbia River was diverted to Alta California, with Fort Ross soon established.

The Russo-American Treaty of 1824 and the 1825 Treaty of Saint Petersburg with the British formally created the southern border of Russian America at parallel 54°40′ north. Specifically, it was agreed, in the 1824 treaty, that no American settlement would be established on the coast or adjacent island north of 54°40′, and no Russian settlement to the south (Russian Fort Ross was in Alta California, Mexico, and was outside the purview of the treaty). The treaty did not make any explicit statements about sovereignty or territorial claims. The 1825 treaty with Britain was more strongly worded and defined the boundary between Russian and British possessions in North America, which ran north from 54°40′ through what is now the Alaska Panhandle to the 141st meridian west, then along that line north to the Arctic Ocean.

=== Early Anglo-American competition ===
Neither the Russian nor Spanish empires held significant plans at promoting colonies along the Northwest Coast by the 1810s. The British and the Americans were the remaining two nations with citizens active in commercial operations in the region. Starting with a party of the Montreal-based North West Company (NWC) employees led by David Thompson in 1807, the British began land-based operations and opened trading posts throughout the region. Thompson extensively explored the Columbia River watershed. While at the junction of Columbia and Snake Rivers, he erected a pole on July 9, 1811, with a notice stating "Know hereby that this country is claimed by Great Britain as part of its territories ..." and additionally stated the intention of the NWC to build a trading post there. Fort Nez Percés was later established at the location in 1818. The American Pacific Fur Company (PFC) began operations in 1811 at Fort Astoria, constructed at the entrance of the Columbia River. The eruption of the War of 1812 did not lead to a violent confrontation in the Pacific Northwest between the competing companies. Led by Donald Mackenzie, PFC officers agreed to liquidate its assets to their NWC competitors, with an agreement signed on 23 November 1813. HMS Racoon was ordered to capture Fort Astoria, though by the time it arrived, the post was already under NWC management. After the collapse of the PFC, American mountain men operated in small groups in the region, typically based east of the Rocky Mountains, only to meet once a year at the annual Rocky Mountain Rendezvous.

== Joint occupation ==
=== Treaty of 1818 ===
In 1818, diplomats of the two countries attempted to negotiate a boundary between the rival claims. The Americans suggested dividing the Pacific Northwest along the 49th parallel, which was the border between the United States and British North America east of the Rocky Mountains. The lack of accurate cartographic knowledge led American diplomats to declare the Louisiana Purchase gave them an incontestable claim to the region. British diplomats wanted a border further south along the Columbia River, so as to maintain the North West Company's (later the Hudson's Bay Company's (HBC)) control of the lucrative fur trade along that river. The diplomatic teams could not agree upon mutually satisfactory terms and remained in deadlock by October. Albert Gallatin, the main American negotiator, had previously instructed to have a tentative agreement by the convening of the third session of the 15th United States Congress, set for 16 November.

A final proposition was made to the British plenipotentiary, Frederick John Robinson, for the continuation of the 49th parallel west while leaving the United Kingdom, as Gallatin stated, "all the waters emptying in the sound called the Gulf of Georgia." This would have awarded "all the territory draining west from the Cascade divide and north from the Columbia River divide into the gulf" and the entirety of the Puget Sound along with the Straits of Georgia and Juan de Fuca to the United Kingdom. Robinson demurred from the proposal. However, the Anglo-American Convention of 1818, which settled most other disputes from the War of 1812, called for the joint occupation of the region for ten years.

=== Proposed partition plans ===
As the expiration of the Joint Occupation treaty approached, a second round of negotiations commenced in 1824. American Minister Richard Rush offered for the extension of agreement with an additional clause on 2 April. The 51° parallel would be a provisional border within the Pacific Northwest, with no British additional settlements to be established south of the line, nor any American settlements north of it. Despite Rush's offering to modify the temporary border to the 49° parallel, the British negotiators rejected his offer. His proposal was seen as the likely basis for the eventual division of the Pacific Northwest. The British plenipotentiaries William Huskisson and Stratford Canning on 29 June pressed instead for a permanent line along the 49° parallel west until the main branch of the Columbia River. With the British formally abandoning claims south or east of the Columbia River, the Oregon Question thence became focused on what later became Western Washington and the southern portion of Vancouver Island. Rush reacted to the British proposal as unfavorably as they had to his own offer, leaving the talks at a stalemate.

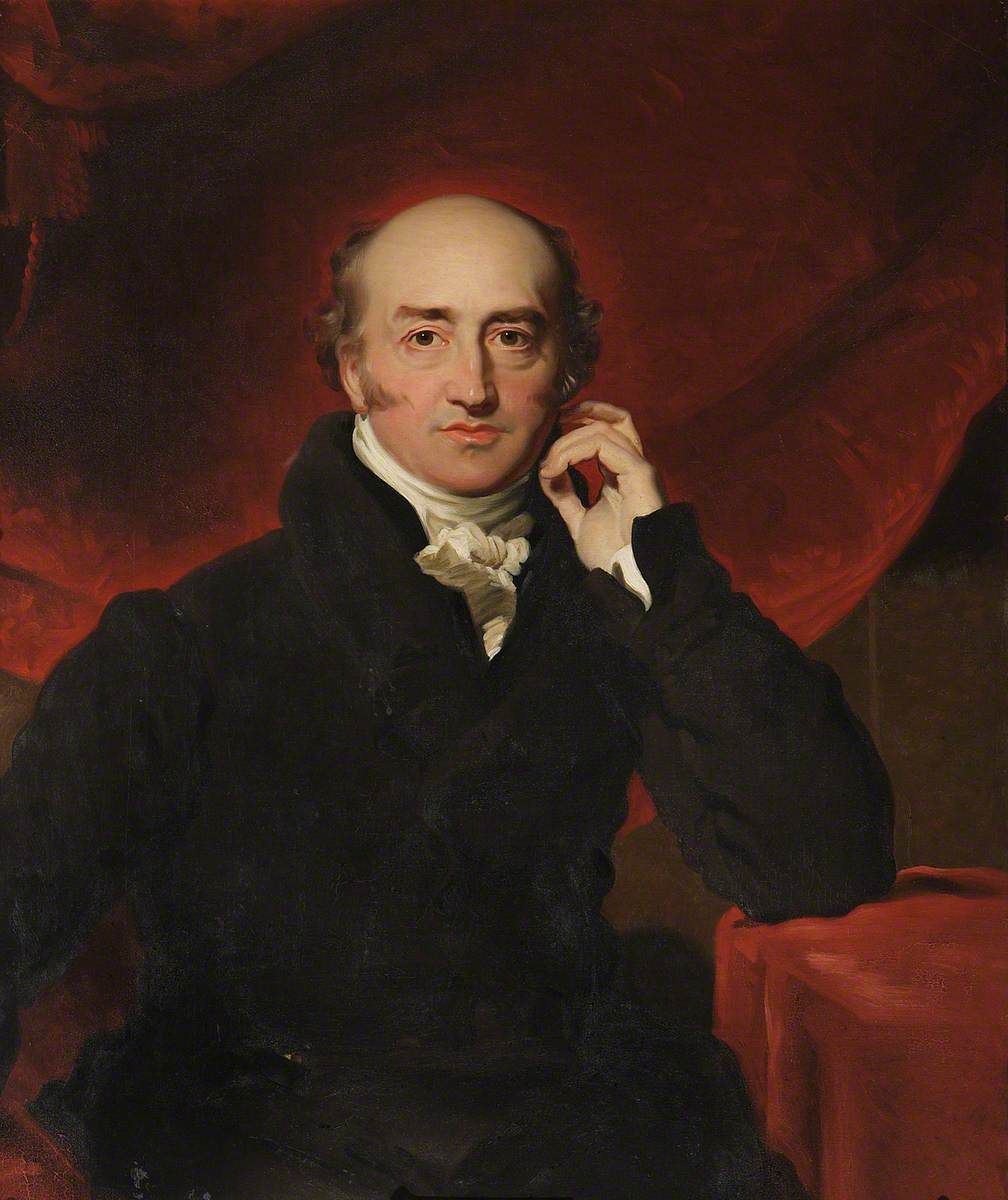
George Canning, the most active Foreign Secretary in maintaining the British claims of a division along the Columbia River

Throughout 1825, George Canning, the Secretary of State for Foreign Affairs, held discussions with Governor Pelly of the HBC as to a potential settlement with the United States. Pelly felt a border along the Snake and Columbia Rivers was advantageous for the United Kingdom and his company. Contacting American minister Rufus King in April 1826, Canning requested that a settlement be reached over the Oregon dispute. Gallatin was appointed Ambassador to the United Kingdom and given instructions by Secretary of State Henry Clay in July 1826 to offer a division of the Pacific Northwest along the 49th parallel to the Pacific Ocean to the British. In a letter to Prime Minister Lord Liverpool in 1826, Canning presented the possibilities of trade with the Qing Empire if a division of the Pacific Northwest was to be made with the Americans. He felt the recognition of American rights to ownership of Astoria, despite its continued use by the NWC and later HBC, was "absolutely unjustifiable". This diplomatic courtesy Canning felt weakened the territorial claims of the United Kingdom. A border along the Columbia River would give "an immense direct intercourse between China and what may be, if we resolve not yield them up, her boundless establishments on the N. W. Coast of America".

=== Renewal ===
Huskisson was appointed along with Henry Unwin Addington to negotiate with Gallatin. Unlike his superior, Canning, Huskisson held a negative view of the HBC monopoly and found the region held in dispute with the Americans "of little consequence to the British". At the time the HBC's staff were the only continuous white occupants in the region, though their economic activities were not utilized by Huskinisson in exchanges with Gallatin. The division suggested by Pelly and Canning's 1824 offer of a Columbia River boundary was rejected. The argument used to counter these offers was the same as in 1824, that a boundary along the Columbia would deny the U.S. an easily accessible deep water port on the Pacific Ocean. The British negotiators to allay this attack offered a detached Olympic Peninsula as American territory, giving access to both the Straits of Juan de Fuca and Puget Sound. This was seen as unsatisfactory by the Americans however. The diplomatic talks were continued but failed to divide the region in a satisfactory manner for both nations. The Treaty of 1818 was renewed on 7 August 1827, with a clause added by Gallatin that a one-year notice had to be given when either party intended to abrogate the agreement. After the death of Canning and the failure to find a satisfactory division of the region with the Americans, "Oregon had been almost forgotten by the [British] politicians".

== Significance in the United States ==
=== Regional activities ===
American Protestant missionaries began to arrive in the 1830s and established the Methodist Mission in the Willamette Valley and the Whitman Mission east of the Cascades. Ewing Young created a saw mill and a grist mill in the Willamette Valley early in the 1830s. He and several other American colonists formed the Willamette Cattle Company in 1837 to bring over 600 head of cattle to the Willamette Valley, with about half of its shares purchased by McLoughlin. Over 700 U.S settlers arrived via the Oregon Trail in the "Great Migration of 1843". The Provisional Government of Oregon was established in the Willamette Valley during 1843 as well. Its rule was limited to those interested Americans and former French-Canadian HBC employees in the valley.

=== John Floyd ===
The first attempts by the American Government for proactive action in colonising the Pacific Northwest began in 1820 during the 2nd session of the 16th Congress. John Floyd, a Representative from Virginia, spearheaded a report that would "authorize the occupation of the Columbia River, and to regulated trade and intercourse with the Indian tribes thereon." Additionally the bill called for cultivating commercial relations with the Qing Empire and the Tokugawa shogunate. His interest in the distant region likely began after meeting former PFC employee Russell Farnham. Floyd had the support of fellow Virginian Representative Thomas Van Swearingen and Representative Thomas Metcalfe of Kentucky. The bill was presented to both the House and to President Monroe. In the House, Floyd's bill was defended by one member who stated that it did not "attempt a colonial settlement. The territory proposed to be occupied is already a part of the United States." Monroe inquired the opinion of Secretary of State John Quincy Adams for potential revisions. Adams retorted that "The paper was a tissue of errors in fact and abortive reasoning, of invidious reflections and rude invectives. There was nothing could purify it but the fire." Read twice before the legislature, "most of the members not considering it a serious proceeding", it did not pass.

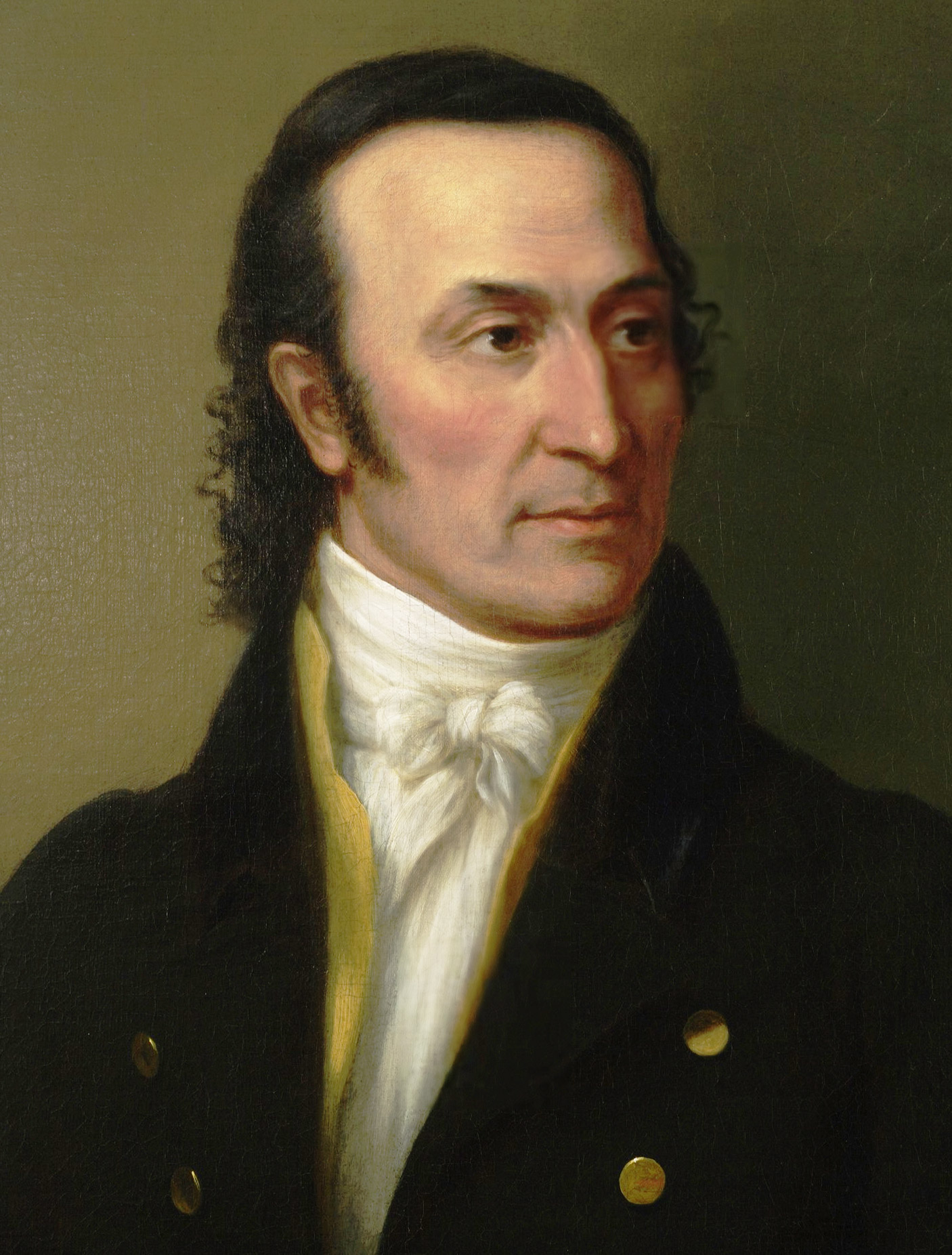
Representative John Floyd was the most prominent early Congressional member in favor of extensive American claims in the Pacific Northwest.

Floyd continued to authorise legislation calling for an American colony on the Pacific. His career as a Representative ended in 1829, with the Oregon Question not discussed at Congress until 1837. The northern border proposed by Floyd was at first the 53°, and later 54°40′. These bills were still met with the apathy or opposition of other Congressional members, one in particular being tabled for consideration by a vote of 100 to 61. Missouri Senator Thomas H. Benton became a vocal supporter of Floyd's efforts, and thought that they would "plant the germ of a powerful and independent Power beyond the Rockies". John C. Calhoun, then Secretary of War, while somewhat interested in Floyd's considered bills, gave his opinion to that the HBC was an economic threat to American commercial interests in the west.

... so long as the traders of the British Fur Company have free access to the region of the Rocky Mountains from the various posts ... they will in great measure monopolize the Fur trade West of the Mississippi, to the almost entire exclusion in the next few years of our trade.

=== 1844 presidential election ===
The 1844 presidential election was a definitive turning point for the United States. Admitting the Texas Republic by diplomatic negotiations to begin a process of annexation of Texas into the nation was a contentious topic. At the same time, the Oregon Question "became a weapon in a struggle for domestic political power". At the Democratic National Convention, the party platform asserted "That our title to the whole of the Territory of Oregon is clear and unquestionable; that no portion of the same ought to be ceded to England or any other power, and that the reoccupation of Oregon and the re-annexation of Texas at the earliest practicable period are great American measures". By tying the Oregon dispute to the more controversial Texas debate, the Democrats appealed to expansionist members from both the Northern and Southern states. Enlargement in the Pacific Northwest offered a means of mollifying Northern fears of allowing Texas, another slave state, by a counterbalance of additional free states. Democratic candidate James K. Polk went on to win a narrow victory over Whig candidate Henry Clay, in part because Clay had taken a stand against immediate expansion in Texas. Despite the use of the Oregon Question in the election, according to Edward Miles, the topic was not "a significant campaign issue" as "the Whigs would have been forced to discuss it".

==== "Fifty-four Forty or Fight!" ====
A popular slogan later associated with Polk and his campaign of 1844, "Fifty-four Forty or Fight!" was not actually coined during the election but appeared only by January 1846 and was promoted and driven in part by the press associated with the Democratic Party. The phrase has since become frequently misidentified as a Polk campaign slogan, even in many textbooks. Bartlett's Familiar Quotations attributes the slogan to William Allen. 54°40′ was the southern boundary of Russian America and considered the northernmost limit of the Pacific Northwest. One actual Democratic campaign slogan from the election (used in Pennsylvania) was the more mundane "Polk, Dallas, and the Tariff of '42".

The southernmost border of Alaska remains 54°40′ since the purchase from Russia on October 18, 1867, with British Columbia, established as the Colony of British Columbia on August 2, 1858.

== British interest ==
=== Hudson's Bay Company ===
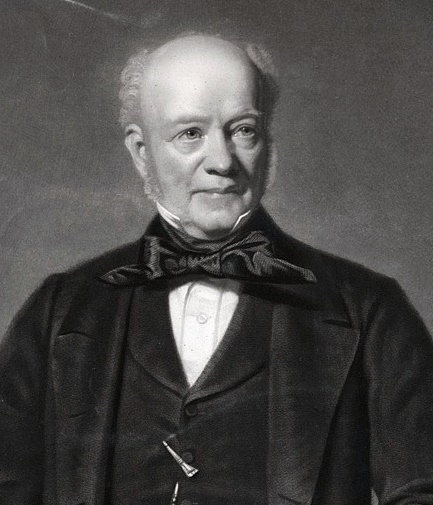
George Simpson, manager of HBC operations in North America, reported in 1837 that the Pacific Northwest "may become an object of very great importance, and we are strengthening that claim to it ... by forming the nucleus of a colony through the establishment of farms, and the settlement of some of our retiring officers and servants as agriculturalists."

The Hudson's Bay Company (HBC) merged with the North West Company in 1821 and assumed its various fur trading stations. The HBC held a license among British subjects to trade with the populous aboriginal peoples of the region, and its network of trading posts and routes extended southward from New Caledonia, another HBC fur-trade district, into the Columbia basin (most of New Caledonia lay south of 54°40'N). The HBC's headquarters for the entire region became established at Fort Vancouver (modern Vancouver, Washington) in 1824. During that year George Simpson while discussing the company's "uncertain tenure of the Columbia" with Governor Colville, discussed the possibility of closing operations along the river. "If the Americans settle on the mouth of the Columbia it would in my opinion be necessary to abandon the Coast [south of the river]". Simpson stated, with the company posts to "move to the Northward". At its pinnacle in the late 1830s and early 1840s, Fort Vancouver watched over 34 outposts, 24 ports, six ships, and 600 employees.

=== Domestic ===
The Edinburgh Review declared the Pacific Northwest "the last corner of the earth left free for the occupation of a civilized race. When Oregon shall be colonised, the map of the world may be considered as filled up."

=== Naval presence ===
Royal Navy ships were dispatched to the Pacific Northwest throughout the decades, to both expand cartographical knowledge and protect fur trading stations. The British established the Pacific Station in 1826 at Valparaíso, Chile, increasing the strategic capabilities of their navy. A squadron was moved there and later vessels sent to the Pacific Northwest were based out of the port. HMS Blossom was in the region during 1818. The next surveying expedition was commenced by HMS Sulphur and HMS Starling in 1837, with operations lasting until 1839. Dispatched from the Pacific Station to gather intelligence on the HBC posts, HMS Modeste arrived at the Columbia River in July 1844. Chief Factor James Douglas complained that the naval officers "had more taste for a lark than a 'musty' lecture on politics or the greater national interests in question." The Modeste visited the HBC trading posts of Forts George, Vancouver, Victoria and Simpson.

== Political efforts during Tyler presidency ==
Missouri Senator Lewis Linn tabled legislation in 1842, inspired in part by Floyd's previous efforts. Linn's bill called for the government to create land grants for men interested in settling the Pacific Northwest. The arrival of Baron Ashburton in April 1842, sent to resolve several territorial disputes with the United States, delayed Linn's legislation. Initially focusing on the Pacific Northwest, Ashburton presented Secretary of State Daniel Webster the 1824 partition proposal made by Canning of a division along the Columbia River. Webster rejected the offer for the same reasons it was previously repudiated; the division would leave the United States with no suitable locations for a large Pacific port. Webster suggested that Ashburton's proposal may have been found acceptable by the Americans, if the United States could be compensated with the Mexican owned San Francisco Bay. Ashburton passed on the offer to his superiors, but no further action was taken. Both diplomats became focused on settling the Aroostook War and formulated the Webster–Ashburton Treaty.

At the final session of the 27th Congress on 19 December 1842, Linn presented a similar bill to colonize the Pacific Northwest, as he put it, "by the Anglo-American race, which will extend our limits from the Atlantic to the Pacific Ocean." Arguments over the bill lasted over a month, and it was eventually passed in the Senate 24–22. In opposition to Linn's bill, Calhoun famously declared that the U.S. government should pursue a policy of "wise and masterly inactivity" in Oregon, letting settlement determine the eventual boundary. Many of Calhoun's fellow Democrats, however, soon began to advocate a more direct approach.

By early 1843, Webster returned to the Oregon Question, formalising a plan that included the 1826 British offer of the Olympic Peninsula enclave and the purchase of Alta California from Mexico. The increasing hostility President Tyler had with the Whig Party led to Webster's disinterest in continuing to act as the Secretary of State and his plan was shelved. The American minister to the UK, Edward Everett, was given authority to negotiate with British officials to settle the Oregon Question in October 1843. Meeting with Prime Minister Robert Peel's Foreign Secretary, Earl of Aberdeen on 29 November, Everett presented the terms considered by President John Tyler. The old offer of the 49th parallel was once more presented, along with a guarantee to free access to the Columbia River. However during President Tyler's State of the Union address that year on 6 December, he claimed "the entire region of country lying on the Pacific and embraced within 42° and 54°40′ of north latitude". After receiving this declaration, Aberdeen began to consult with the committee and Governor Pelly, previously left out of the most recent diplomatic exchanges.

== Polk presidency ==
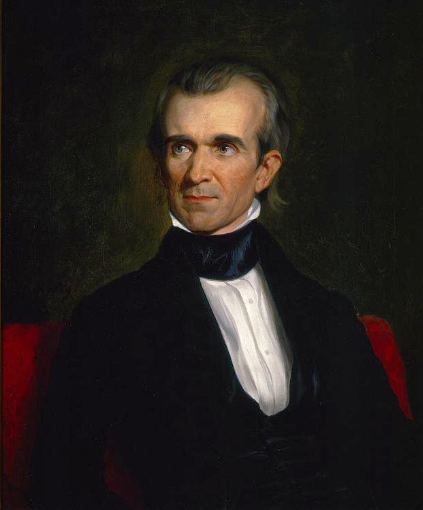
President James K. Polk was elected in 1844 in part from his support for substantial claims against the British. Much of this rhetoric was to make the United Kingdom accept the long tabled proposed division along the 49th parallel.

In his March 1845 inaugural address, President Polk quoted from the party platform, saying that the U.S. title to Oregon was "clear and unquestionable". Tensions grew, with both sides moving to strengthen border fortifications in anticipation of war. Despite Polk's bold language, he was actually prepared to compromise, and had no real desire to go to war over Oregon. He believed that a firm stance would compel the British to accept a resolution agreeable to the United States. While meeting with Representative James A. Black on 4 January 1846, Polk stated that "the only way to treat John Bull was to look him straight in the eye ... if Congress faultered [sic] ... John Bull would immediately become arrogant and more grasping in his demands". But Polk's position on Oregon was not mere posturing: he genuinely believed that the U.S. had a legitimate claim to the entire region. He rejected British offers to settle the dispute through arbitration, fearing that no impartial third party could be found.

Many newspaper editors in the United States clamored for Polk to claim the entire region as the Democrats had proposed in the 1844 campaign. Headlines like "The Whole of Oregon or None" by The Union editor Thomas Ritchie appeared on 6 November 1845. In a column in the New York Morning News on December 27, 1845, editor John L. O'Sullivan argued that the United States should claim all of Oregon "by the right of our manifest destiny to overspread and to possess the whole of the continent which Providence has given us". Soon afterwards, the term "Manifest Destiny" became a standard phrase for expansionists, and a permanent part of the American lexicon. O'Sullivan's version of "Manifest Destiny" was not a call for war, but such calls were soon forthcoming.

After Polk's inauguration, British diplomats began to receive instructions influenced from HBC officials like Simpson, whose suggestions were transmitted through Pelly and then Aberdeen to the British Ambassador Richard Pakenham. In a letter written to Calhoun in August 1844, Pakenham pressed for a border along the Columbia River. He made an offer that likely originated from Simpson: Americans could select naval bases on the portion of Vancouver Island south of the 49th parallel or along the Strait of Juan de Fuca in return. Diplomatic channels continued negotiations throughout 1844; by early 1845 Everett reported the willingness of Aberdeen to accept the 49th parallel, provided the southern portion of Vancouver Island would become British territory.

In the summer of 1845, the Polk administration renewed the proposal to divide Oregon along the 49th parallel to the Pacific Ocean. U.S. Secretary of State James Buchanan on 12 July offered the British any desired ports on the portion of Vancouver Island south of this line, though navigation rights of the Columbia River were not included. Because this proposal fell short of the Tyler administration's earlier offer, Pakenham rejected the offer without first contacting London. Offended, Polk officially withdrew the proposal on August 30, 1845, and broke off negotiations. Aberdeen censured Pakenham for this diplomatic blunder, and attempted to renew the dialogue. By then, however, Polk was suspicious of British intentions, and under increasing political pressure not to compromise. He declined to reopen negotiations.

== War crisis ==
Important figures in the Oregon Question
United States	United Kingdom
James K. Polk; President	Robert Peel; Prime Minister
James Buchanan; Secretary of State	Earl of Aberdeen; Foreign Secretary
Louis McLane; Minister to the UK	Richard Pakenham; Minister in Washington

=== Congressional pressure ===
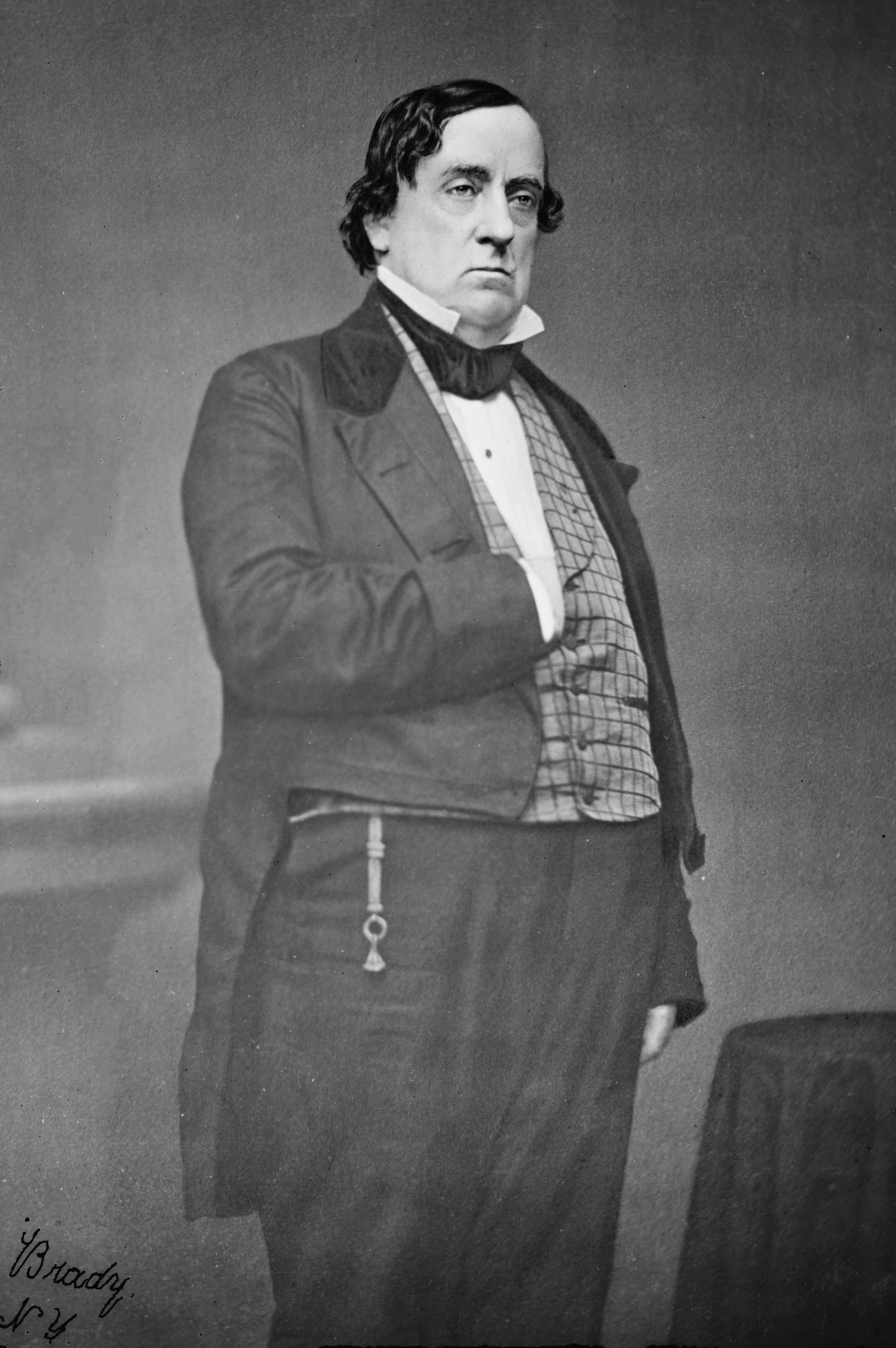
Senator Lewis Cass was a leading advocate of 54°40′, but backed away from the claim when it became untenable. Like James Buchanan, Cass had presidential ambitions and did not want to alienate Americans on either side of the Oregon Question.

In his annual address to Congress on December 2, 1845, Polk recommended giving the British the required one-year notice of the termination of the joint occupation agreement. Democratic expansionists in Congress from the Midwest, led by Senators Lewis Cass of Michigan, Edward A. Hannegan of Indiana, and William Allen of Ohio, called for war with the United Kingdom rather than accepting anything short of all of Oregon up to Parallel 54°40′ north. These pronouncements were fueled by a number of factors, including traditional distrust of the British and a belief that the U.S. had the better claim and would make better use of the land.

The debate was not strictly divided along party or sectional lines, with many who clamored for the 54°40′ border being Northerners upset at Polk's willingness to compromise on the Pacific Northwest border. Polk's uncompromising pursuit of Texas, an acquisition seen favorable for Southern slave owners, angered many advocates of 54°40′, as the President was a Southerner and a slave owner. As historian David M. Pletcher noted, "Fifty-Four Forty or Fight" seemed to be directed at the southern aristocracy in the U.S. as much as at the United Kingdom.

Moderates like Webster warned that the U.S. could not win a war against the British Empire, and that negotiation could still achieve U.S. territorial goals. Webster confided to Viscount Ossington, a personal friend, on 26 February 1846, that it would be a "stupendous folly and enormous crime" for the two nations to declare war over the Pacific Northwest.

=== British reaction ===
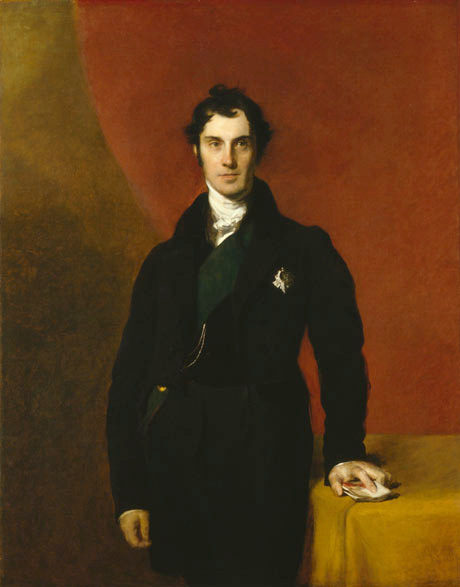
Portrait of Lord Aberdeen by Thomas Lawrence, 1830. Foreign Secretary Lord Aberdeen was committed to maintaining peaceable relations with the Americans, evaluating the disputed territory in the Oregon Question as unimportant.

==== Pacific naval forces ====
During the height of tensions with the United States in 1845 and 1846, there were at least five Royal Navy vessels operating in the Pacific Northwest.

The 80-gun ship-of-the-line HMS Collingwood was deployed to Valparaíso under the commander in chief, Rear Admiral Sir George Seymour, in 1845, with orders to report on the situation in the region. HMS America, under the command of Captain John Gordon (younger brother Foreign Secretary Aberdeen), was therefore sent north that year. Roderick Finlayson gave a tour of Vancouver Island to the visiting naval officers, where Gordon aired his negative appraisal of the Northwest region. During a deer hunt on the island, Gordon informed Finlayson that he "would not give one of the barren hills of Scotland for all he saw around him". America departed from the Strait of Juan de Fuca on October 1.

HMS Modeste entered the Columbia River and arrived at Fort Vancouver on November 30, 1845, where it remained until May 4, 1847. Modeste, an 18 gun sloop was not favorably viewed by American colonists in the Willamette Valley, who felt threatened by the large warship's presence. Relations were improved when the officers organized a ball at Vancouver on February 3, 1846, later theatrical performances by the ship's crew, including Love in a Village and The Mock Doctor, along with picnics.

HMS Fisgard was the first reinforcement, ordered from the Pacific Station by Rear Admiral Seymour in January 1846. Captain Duntze was to "afford Protection to Her Majesty's Subjects in Oregon and the North West Coast" and avoid any potential confrontations with American settlers. On May 5, Fisgard reached Fort Victoria, later moving to Fort Nisqually on the 18th, where it remained until October. Sent to aid other British vessels navigate difficult channels and rivers, HMS Cormorant, a paddle steamer, arrived at the Strait of Juan de Fuca in June. Two survey ships were dispatched from Plymouth in June 1845, HMS Herald and HMS Pandora, for charting the coast of the Americas. The vessels reached Cape Flattery on 24 June 1846. Cormorant towed Herald to Fort Victoria three days later. Herald and Pandora spent several months charting Puget Sound and Vancouver Island until 2 September, when the vessels sailed for Alta California. Fisgard and Cormorant both departed for Valparaíso in October. As Modeste was the only British ship in the region during 1847, the Oregon Treaty "seemed to have taken the edge off of the Royal Navy's interest in the Northwest Coast".

==== War plan ====
Due to his extensive travels throughout the western stations of the HBC, Governor Pelly instructed George Simpson to draft a plan for the British Government if hostilities were to arise with the Americans. Finalizing the proposal on March 29, 1845, Simpson called for two areas to launch offensives. The Red River Colony would be the base of operations for forays into the Great Plains, an expansive region then only lightly colonized by Americans. A militia composed of Métis riflemen and neighboring First Nations like the Ojibwe would be created, along with a garrison of Regular Army infantry. To secure the Pacific Northwest and the Columbia River, Simpson felt Cape Disappointment was of critical importance. A naval force of two steamboats and two ships of the line would bring a detachment of Royal Marines to create a coastal battery there. Simpson hoped to recruit a force, led by Regular Army officers, of 2,000 Métis and indigenous peoples in the region. His proposal quickly earned the interest of the British Government as he met with Prime Minister Peel and Foreign Secretary Aberdeen on April 2. £1,000 was awarded to lay the ground work for defensive operations in the Pacific Northwest. Lord Stanley, the Secretary of State for War and the Colonies, favored the plan, declaring that the HBC had to finance military operations west of Sault Ste. Marie.

== Resolution ==
Aberdeen had no intention of going to war over a region that was of diminishing economic value to the United Kingdom. Furthermore the United States was an important trading partner, especially with the need of American wheat in the onset of famine in Ireland. Aberdeen and Pakenham were negotiating from a position of strength. The key was the overwhelming naval power which Britain could have brought to bear against the United States, combined with a diplomatic and political landscape that ultimately favored the British government's aim of protecting their interests robustly but without resort to armed conflict. Ultimately British politicians and naval officers recognized that any conflict over the Oregon boundary, however undesirable, would be decided, like the War of 1812, on the Eastern Seaboard of the U.S. and the Great Lakes. The Royal Navy's presence on the Atlantic seaboard was not as numerically prominent as the American forces, yet its overall superiority to the U.S. Navy was decisive upon American decision-making during the crisis, especially their decision to compromise. Louis McLane, the American minister in the United Kingdom, reported to Buchanan on 2 February that the British were prepared "to commission immediately some thirty ships-of-the-line in addition to steamers and other vessels held in reserve". Polk's bluff had been called.

American diplomat Edward Everett contacted the Whig leader John Russell on 28 December 1845, supporting a revision of the American offer so as to allow the British to keep the entirety of Vancouver Island. He warned Russell that influence among the Whigs could stifle the negotiations. "If you choose to rally the public opinion of England against this basis of compromise, it will not be easy for Sir R. Peel and Lord Aberdeen to agree to it." While still considering the Columbia River important for British interests, Russell assured Aberdeen of his support in settling the Oregon Question. While Everett's was influential in this political move, Russell felt it was, as Frederick Merk stated, "prudent Whig policy" to support Aberdeen in this case.

Although Polk had called on Congress in December 1845 to pass a resolution notifying the British of the termination of joint occupancy agreement, it was not until April 23, 1846 that both houses complied. The passage was delayed especially in the Senate by contentious debate. Several Southern Senators, like William S. Archer and John M. Berrien, were wary of military capabilities of the British Empire. Ultimately a mild resolution was approved, the text of which called on both governments to settle the matter amicably.

By a large margin, moderation had won out over calls for war. Unlike Western Democrats, most Congressmen—like Polk—did not want to fight for 54°40′. The Polk administration then made it known that the British government should offer terms to settle the dispute. Despite the cooling diplomatic relations, a repeat of the War of 1812 was not popular with either nation's government. Time was of the essence, because it was well known that the Peel government would fall with the impending repeal of the Corn Laws in the United Kingdom, and then negotiations would have to begin again with a new ministry. At a time when the European continental balance was a far more pressing problem, a costly war with a major trading partner was not popular with the British government. Aberdeen and McLane quickly worked out a compromise and sent it to the United States.

== Oregon Treaty ==
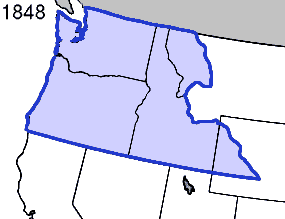
The Oregon Territory, as established after the Oregon Treaty, superimposed over the current state boundaries.

Pakenham and Buchanan drew up a formal treaty, known as the Oregon Treaty, which was ratified by the Senate on June 18, 1846, by a vote of 41–14. The mainland border was set at the 49th parallel, the original U.S. proposal, with navigation rights on the Columbia River granted to British subjects living in the area. Senator William Allen, one of the most outspoken advocates of the 54° 40′ claim, felt betrayed by Polk and resigned his chairmanship of the Foreign Relations Committee. The signing of the treaty ended the joint occupation with the United Kingdom, making most Oregonians south of the 49th parallel U.S. citizens.

Henry Commager appraised the factors leading to the settlement as "a combination of temporary, fortuitous, and circumstantial phenomena, extraneous to the local situation, largely outside of American control, and foreign to American influence." Canadian Hugh Ll. Keenleyside and American Gerald S. Brown wrote a century after the treaty that

under the existing conditions, [it] was just and equitable. Neither nation had a clear legal title to any of the territory, and the result was practically an equal division. Great Britain was given the better harbors, and greater resources in minerals, timber, and fish; the United States received much more agricultural land, and a district that has, on the whole, a better climate. This decision, moreover, is almost unique among the solutions of American boundary troubles, in that it has been accepted with reasonable satisfaction by both nations. A better proof of its justice could hardly be demanded.[emphasis in original]

The terms of the Oregon Treaty were essentially the same ones that had been offered earlier by the Tyler administration, and thus represented a diplomatic victory for Polk. However, Polk has often been criticized for his handling of the Oregon Question. Historian Sam W. Haynes characterizes Polk's policy as "brinkmanship" which "brought the United States perilously close to a needless and potentially disastrous conflict". David M. Pletcher notes that while Polk's bellicose stance was the by-product of internal American politics, the war crisis was "largely of his own creation" and might have been avoided "with more sophisticated diplomacy". According to Jesse Reeves, "Had Palmerston been in Aberdeen's position at the time of Polk's 'firm' pronouncement, Polk might have lost Oregon." Aberdeen's desire for peace and good relations with the United States "are responsible for the settlement that Polk thought to gain by a firm policy. That Aberdeen was 'bluffed' by Polk is absurd."

The treaty set the mainland boundary at the 49th parallel and retained Vancouver Island as British territory, but it was ambiguously phrased about the route of the boundary through the water. The treaty provided that the marine boundary would follow "the deepest channel" out to the Strait of Juan de Fuca, which left the fate of the San Juan Islands in question. After the "Pig War", arbitration by Kaiser Wilhelm I of the German Empire led to the Treaty of Washington, which awarded the United States all the islands.

Upper Canada politicians and public, already angry with the Oregon Treaty, were once again upset that Britain had not looked after their interests and sought greater autonomy in international affairs.

== Historical maps ==
The boundary between British and American territory was shown differently in maps at the time:

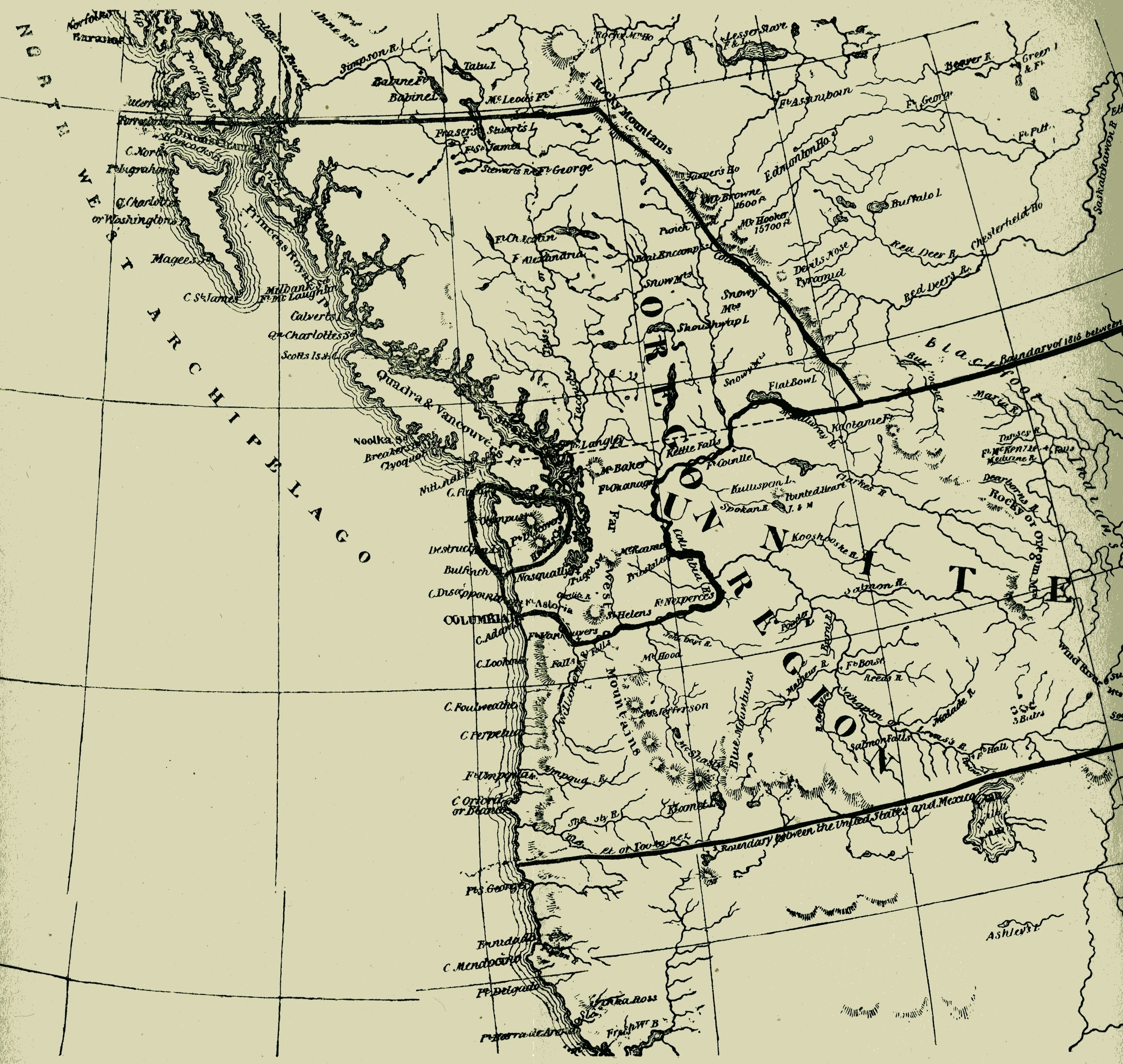
The 1826 proposal of Huskisson and Addington

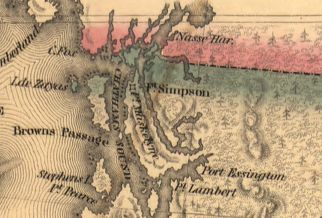
An 1841 American map showing the 54°40′ line near Fort Simpson as the boundary

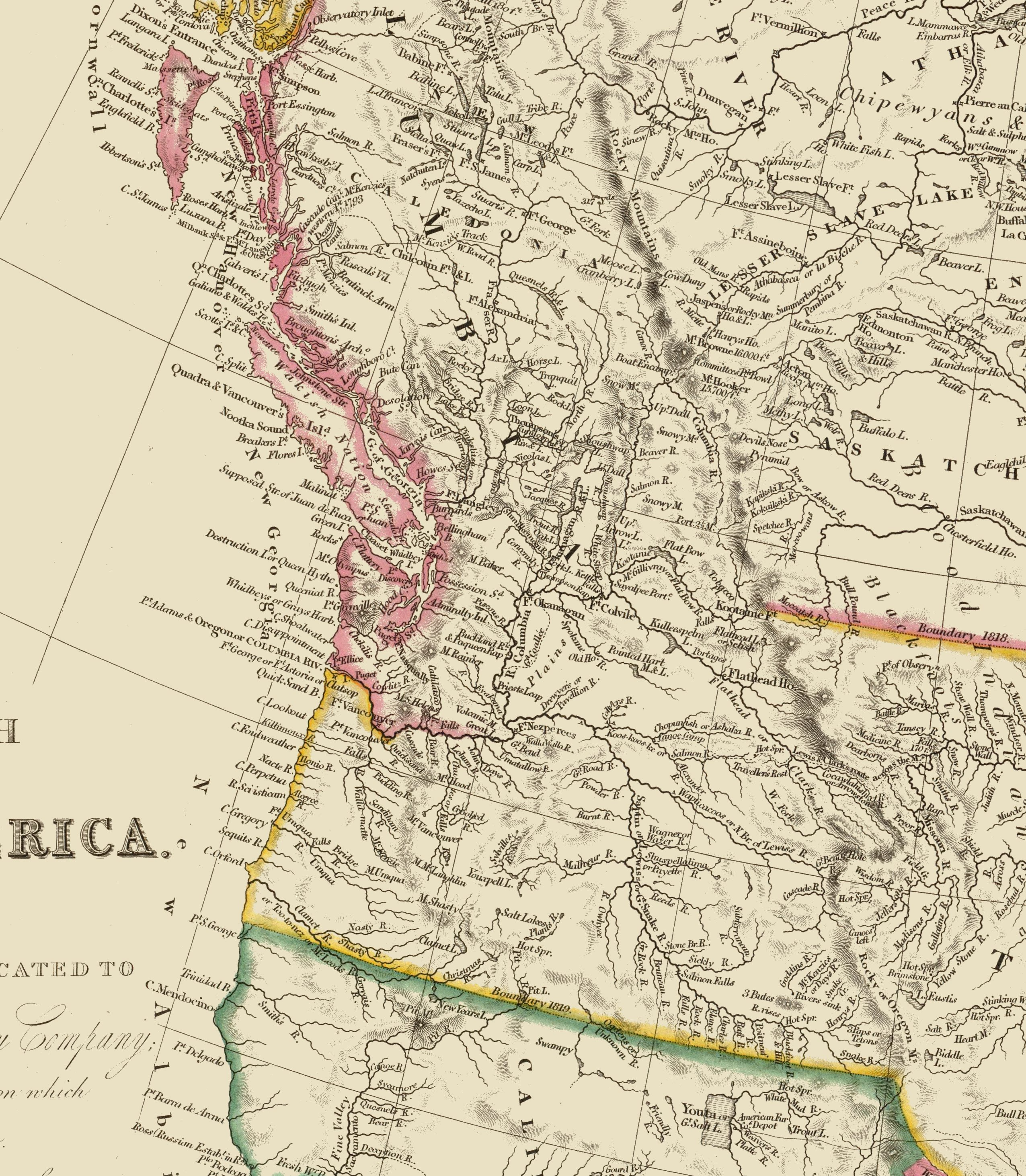
An 1844 British map showing the Columbia River as the boundary

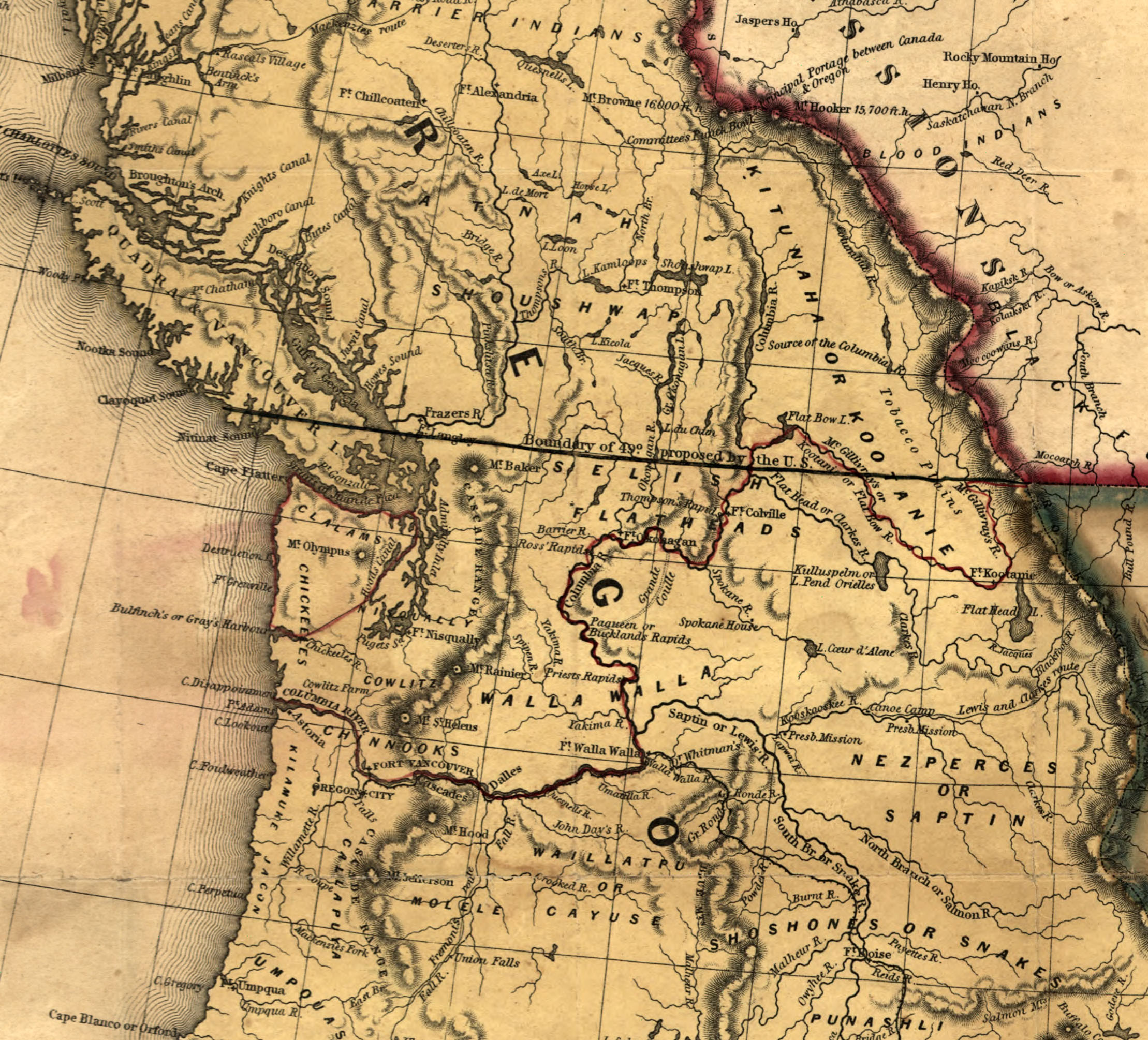
An 1846 map showing the 49th parallel as the boundary through Vancouver Island

== See also ==
- Oregon Treaty
- Pig War (1859)
- Presidency of James K. Polk
- United Kingdom–United States relations

== General and cited references ==
=== Primary sources ===
- Adams, John Quincy (1875), Adams, Charles F. (ed.), Memoirs of John Quincy Adams, vol. 5, Philadelphia: J.B. Lippincott and Co.
- Benton, Thomas H. (1854), Thirty years' view, vol. 1, New York: D. Appleton and Co.
- Canning, George (1887), Stapleton, Edward J. (ed.), Some Official Correspondence of George Canning, vol. II, London: Longmans, Green and Co.
- Owens, Kenneth N., ed. (1985), The Wreck of the Sv. Nikolai, translated by Donnelly, Alton S., Portland, OR: The Press of the Oregon Historical Society
- The Edinburgh Review or Critical Journal: For July, 1843.... October, 1843, vol. 78, Edinburgh: Ballantyne and Hughes, 1843
- Finlayson, Roderick (1891), Biography of Roderick Finlayson, Victoria, B.C., ISBN 9780665149818
- Government Printing Office (1872), Papers relating to the Treaty of Washington, vol. V, Washington D.C.: Government Printing Office, ISBN 9780665158452
- Langsdorff, Grigory (1927), Langsdorff's Narrative of the Rezanov voyage to Nueva California in 1806, translated by Russell, Thomas C, San Francisco, CA: The Private Press of Thomas C. Russell
- McLoughlin, John (1944), Rich, E.E. (ed.), The Letters of John McLoughlin from Fort Vancouver to the Governor and Committee, Third Series, 1844–1846, London
- Merk, Frederick (1968), Fur Trade and Empire; George Simpson's Journal 1824–25, Cambridge, MA: Belknap
- Miller, Hunter, ed. (1937), Treaties and Other International Acts of the United States of America, Treaties, etc, vol. 5, Washington, D.C.: Government Printing Office
- Polk, James K. (2014), "Inaugural Address of James Knox Polk", The Avalon Project, Yale Law School, archived from the original on 20 March 2015
- Polk, James K. (1910), Quaife, Milo M. (ed.), The Diary of James K. Polk during his Presidency, 1845 to 1849, vol. 1, Chicago: A. C. McClurg & Co., ISBN 9780527717001
- Seemann, Berthold (1853), Narrative of the Voyage of the H.M.S. Herald during the years 1845–51, London: Reeve & Co.

=== Secondary sources ===
- Chittenden, Hiram M. (1902), The American Fur Trade in the Far West, vol. 1, New York City: Francis P. Harper
- Sir James Douglas, Chapter V The Oregon Boundary, Robert Hamilton Coats and R. Edward Gosnell, publ. Morang, Toronto, 1908
- Commager, Henry (1927), "England and Oregon Treaty of 1846", Oregon Historical Quarterly, 28 (1), Oregon Historical Society: 18–38
- Elliott, T. C. (1911), "David Thompson, Pathfinder and the Columbia River", The Quarterly of the Oregon Historical Society, 12 (3): 195–205, JSTOR 20609875
- Galbraith, John S. (1957), The Hudson's Bay Company as an Imperial Factor, 1821–1869, Toronto: University of Toronto Press
- Gough, Barry M. (1971), The Royal Navy and the Northwest Coast of North America, 1810–1914, Vancouver, B.C.: University of British Columbia Press
- Graebner, Norman A. (1955), Empire on the Pacific; a study in American continental expansion, New York: New York Ronald Press Co.
- Haynes, Sam W. (1997), James K. Polk and the Expansionist Impulse, Arlington: University of Texas
- Horsman, Reginald (1981), Race and Manifest Destiny: The Origins of American Racial Anglo-Saxonism, Cambridge, MA: Harvard University Press
- Keenleyside, Hugh Ll.; Brown, Gerald S. (1952) [1929], Canada and the United States: Some Aspects of Their Historical Relations (2nd ed.), Alfred A. Knopf, OL 13524947M
- Longstaff, F. V.; Lamb, W. K. (1945a), "The Royal Navy on the Northwest Coast, 1813–1850. Part 1." (PDF), The British Columbia Historical Quarterly, 9 (1): 1–24
- Longstaff, F. V.; Lamb, W. K. (1945b), "The Royal Navy on the Northwest Coast, 1813–1850. Part 2." (PDF), The British Columbia Historical Quarterly, 9 (2): 113–128
- Mackie, Richard Somerset (1997), Trading Beyond the Mountains: The British Fur Trade on the Pacific 1793–1843, Vancouver [B.C.]: UBC Press, ISBN 978-0-7748-0559-9, OCLC 180704193
- Merk, Frederick (1932), "British Party Politics and the Oregon Treaty", The American Historical Review, 37 (4): 653–677, doi:10.2307/1843332, JSTOR 1843332
- Merk, Frederick (1950), "The Ghost River Caledonia in the Oregon Negotiation of 1818", The American Historical Review, 50 (3): 530–551, doi:10.2307/1843497, JSTOR 1843497
- Marshall, William I. (1911), Acquisition of Oregon and the Long Suppressed Evidence about Marcus Whitman, vol. 1, Seattle: Lowman & Hanford Co.
- Meany, Edmond S. (1914), "Three Diplomats Prominent in the Oregon Question", The Washington Historical Quarterly, 5 (3), University of Washington: 207–214, JSTOR 40474377
- Miles, E.A. (1957), "'Fifty-Four Forty or Fight' – An American Political Legend", Mississippi Valley Historical Review, 44 (2): 291–309, doi:10.2307/1887191, JSTOR 1887191
- Rakestraw, Donald A. For Honor or Destiny: The Anglo-American Crisis over the Oregon Territory (Peter Lang Publishing, 1995)
- Pletcher, David M. (1973), The Diplomacy of Annexation: Texas, Oregon, and the Mexican War, Columbia, MO: University of Missouri Press
- Reeves, Jesse S. (1907), American Diplomacy under Tyler and Polk, Baltimore: The Johns Hopkins Press, ISBN 9780722288580
- Rosenboom, Eugene H. (1970), A History of Presidential Elections: From George Washington to Richard M. Nixon (3rd ed.), New York: Macmillan
- A history of British Columbia, Chapter IX "The Oregon Boundary", pp. 89–96, E.O.S. Scholefield, British Columbia Historical Association, Vancouver, British Columbia, 1913
- Shewmaker, Kenneth E. (1982), "Daniel Webster and the Oregon Question", Pacific Historical Review, 51 (2): 195–201, doi:10.2307/3638529, JSTOR 3638529
- Shippee, Lester B. (1918), "The Federal Relations of Oregon", The Quarterly of the Oregon Historical Society, 19 (2), Oregon Historical Society: 89–133, JSTOR 20610098
- Sperber, Hans (1957), ""Fifty-four Forty or Fight": Facts and Fictions", American Speech, 32 (1): 5–11, doi:10.2307/454081, JSTOR 454081
- Walker, Dale L. (1999), Bear Flag Rising: The Conquest of California, 1846, New York: Macmillan, ISBN 0312866852
- Wilson, Joseph R. (1900), "The Oregon Question. II", The Quarterly of the Oregon Historical Society, 1 (3), Oregon Historical Society: 213–252, JSTOR 20609465
- Wiltse, Charles M. (1973), "Daniel Webster and the British Experience", Proceedings of the Massachusetts Historical Society, 85: 58–77
