= Adams–Onís Treaty =

Treaty ceding Spanish Florida to the U.S. (1819)

Treaty of Amity, Settlement and Limits between the United States of America, and His Catholic Majesty
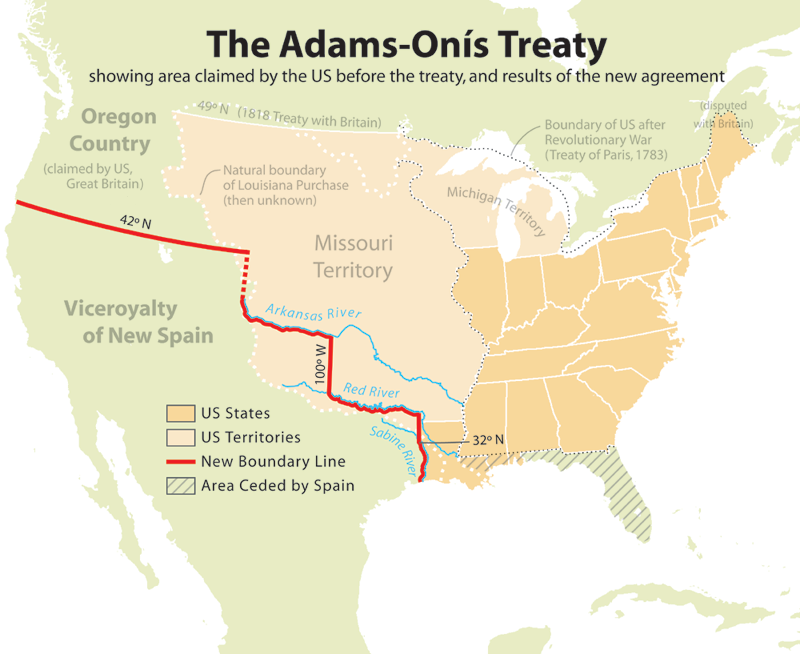
- Boundaries established by the Adams–Onís Treaty.
- Type: Bilateral treaty
- Context: Territorial cession
- Signed: February 22, 1819
- Location: Washington, D.C.
- Effective: February 22, 1821
- Expiry: April 14, 1903
- Parties: Spanish Empire; United States
- Citations: 8 Stat. 252; TS 327; 11 Bevans 528; 3 Miller 3
- Languages: English, Spanish
- Terminated by the Treaty of Friendship and General Relations of July 3, 1902 (33 Stat. 2105; TS 422; 11 Bevans 528).

The Adams–Onís Treaty (Note: Spanish: Tratado de Adams-Onís, also known as the Transcontinental Treaty, the Spanish Cession, or the Florida Purchase Treaty.) was an agreement between the United States and Spain, signed February 22, 1819, by John Quincy Adams and Luis de Onís respectively. The United States acquired Florida while renouncing claims to Spanish Texas and establishing its first transcontinental boundary.

The provisions of the treaty remained in full effect only until August 24, 1821, when the Treaty of Córdoba acknowledged Mexican independence from Spain. In the 1828 Treaty of Limits (Mexico–United States), the border defined by the Adams–Onís Treaty was recognized as the boundary between Mexico and the US, although following the 1845 Texas annexation, it was amended again by the Treaty of Guadalupe Hidalgo. The Adams–Onís Treaty was formally terminated in 1902.

== Background ==
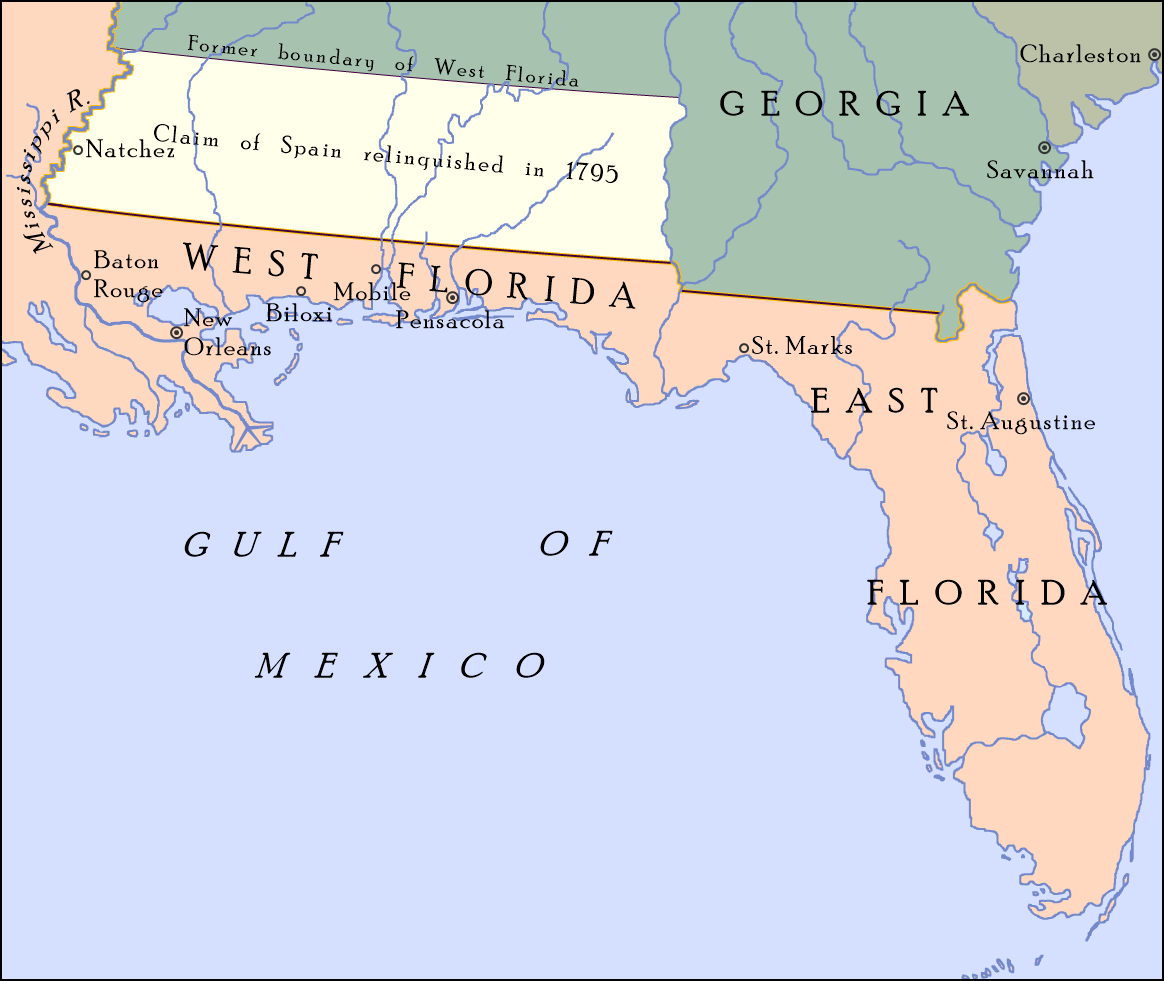
Boundaries established by Pinckney's Treaty

Pinckney's Treaty of 1795 established borders between the United States and Spanish Florida, but expansion by American settlers into this region led to ongoing disputes between the countries. The 1803 Louisiana Purchase caused further arguments over whether the new boundary to the south ran along the Sabine River, or the Rio Grande. (Note: "The idea the Louisiana Purchase extended to the Rio Grande became a certainty with Jefferson early in 1804.")

The outbreak of the Peninsular War in 1807 and the Spanish American wars of independence in 1808, undermined Madrid's ability to retain its American territories. Between 1810 and 1813, the US took advantage to annex West Florida in piecemeal fashion from the Mississippi east to the Perdido River, the modern state boundary with Alabama.

During the first of the Seminole Wars from 1817 to 1818, the US occupied the rest of Florida, presenting John Quincy Adams, then Secretary of State, an opportunity to negotiate favorable terms. His policy was to simultaneously avoid foreign commitments, but to also establish the US as the preponderant power on the North American continent. This required the elimination as far as possible of competing Spanish, Russian and British interests in the region, and extending the limits of American power to the Pacific. These principles were set out in more detail in the 1823 Monroe Doctrine.

By 1819, Spain was prepared to accept the loss of Florida in exchange for a firm border in Texas. For his part, Adams saw an opportunity to remove outstanding Spanish claims in the Western United States, and establish the US' first transcontinental boundary. Despite their increasingly tenuous position in New Spain, the Madrid government was prepared to make concessions, hoping to regain them at a later date.

== Provisions ==
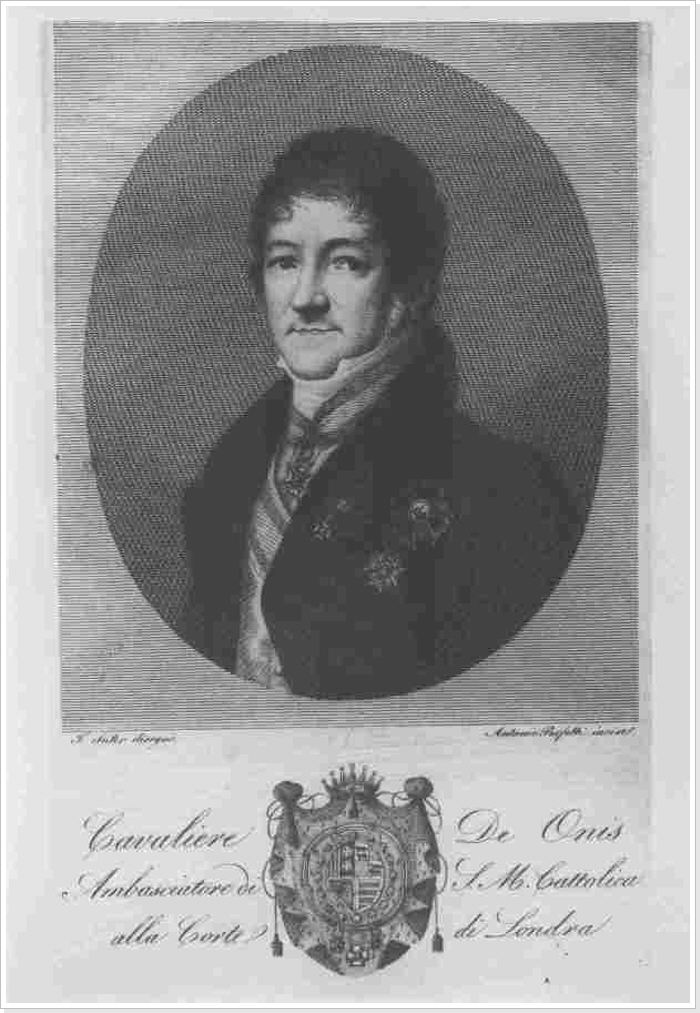
Luis de Onís, Spanish negotiator

Negotiations were held in Washington, D.C., led by Adams for the United States, and Luis de Onís, the Spanish ambassador, resulting in a final agreement of 16 articles.

Key provisions included Article 2, transferring East and West Florida to the US, and Article 3, defining the southern border between the two countries, while Spain withdrew historic claims to the Oregon Country. (Note: Article 3 of the treaty states: The Boundary Line between the two Countries, West of the Mississippi, shall begin on the Gulf of Mexico, at the mouth of the River Sabine in the Sea (29°40′42″N 93°50′03″W), continuing North, along the Western Bank of that River, to the 32d degree of Latitude (32°00′00″N 94°02′45″W); thence by a Line due North to the degree of Latitude, where it strikes the Rio Roxo of Nachitoches, or Red-River (33°33′04″N 94°02′45″W), then following the course of the Rio-Roxo Westward to the degree of Longitude, 100 West from London and 23 from Washington (34°33′37″N 100°00′00″W), then crossing the said Red-River, and running thence by a Line due North to the River Arkansas (37°44′38″N 100°00′00″W), thence, following the Course of the Southern bank of the Arkansas to its source in Latitude, 42. North and thence by that parallel of Latitude to the South-Sea [Pacific Ocean]. The whole being as laid down in Melishe's Map of the United States, published at Philadelphia, improved to the first of January 1818. But if the Source of the Arkansas River shall be found to fall North or South of Latitude 42, then the Line shall run from the said Source (39°15′30″N 106°20′38″W) due South or North, as the case may be, till it meets the said Parallel of Latitude 42 (42°00′00″N 106°20′38″W), and thence along the said Parallel to the South Sea (42°00′00″N 124°12′46″W).) Other terms included an agreement by the US government to compensate American settlers for alleged losses inflicted by the Spanish, the continuation of Pinckney's Treaty, and most favoured nation privileges for Spanish traders in Pensacola and St. Augustine for twelve years.

== Implementation ==
The U.S. Senate approved the treaty unanimously on February 24, 1819, but Madrid delayed ratification until October 1820, hoping to dissuade the US from supporting anti-Spanish revolutionaries. As a result of the delay, the Senate had to vote a second time, at which point Henry Clay and others demanded the cession of Texas in addition. This proposal was defeated and the treaty officially made effective on February 22, 1821.

In accordance with Article 11, the US government set up a commission to handle claims made by private American citizens against Spain, which distributed around $5 million prior to its dissolution in 1824.

For the United States, this Treaty (and the Treaty of 1818 with Britain agreeing to joint control of the Pacific Northwest) meant that its claimed territory now extended far west from the Mississippi River to the Pacific Ocean. For Spain, it meant that it kept its colony of Texas and also kept a buffer zone between its colonies in California and New Mexico and the U.S. territories. Many historians consider the Treaty to be a great achievement for the U.S., as time validated Adams's vision that it would allow the U.S. to open trade with the Orient across the Pacific.

Informally this new border has been called the "Step Boundary", although the step-like shape of the boundary was not apparent for several decades—the source of the Arkansas, believed to be near the 42nd parallel north, was not known until John C. Frémont located it in the 1840s, hundreds of miles south of the 42nd parallel.

Spain finally recognized the independence of Mexico with the Treaty of Córdoba signed on August 24, 1821. While Mexico was not initially a party to the Adams–Onís Treaty, in 1831 Mexico ratified the treaty by agreeing to the 1828 Treaty of Limits with the U.S.

With the Russo-American Treaty of 1824, the Russian Empire ceded its claims south of parallel 54°40′ north to the United States. With the Treaty of Saint Petersburg in 1825, Russia set the southern border of Alaska on the same parallel in exchange for the Russian right to trade south of that border and the British right to navigate north of that border. This set the absolute limits of the Oregon Country/Columbia District between the 42nd parallel north and the parallel 54°40′ north west of the Continental Divide.

By the mid-1830s, a controversy developed regarding the border with Texas, during which the United States demonstrated that the Sabine and Neches rivers had been switched on maps, moving the frontier in favor of Mexico. As a consequence, the eastern boundary of Texas was not firmly established until the independence of the Republic of Texas in 1836. It was not agreed upon by the United States and Mexico until the Treaty of Guadalupe Hidalgo in 1848, which concluded the Mexican–American War. That treaty also formalized the cession by Mexico of Alta California and today's American Southwest, except for the territory of the later Gadsden Purchase of 1854.

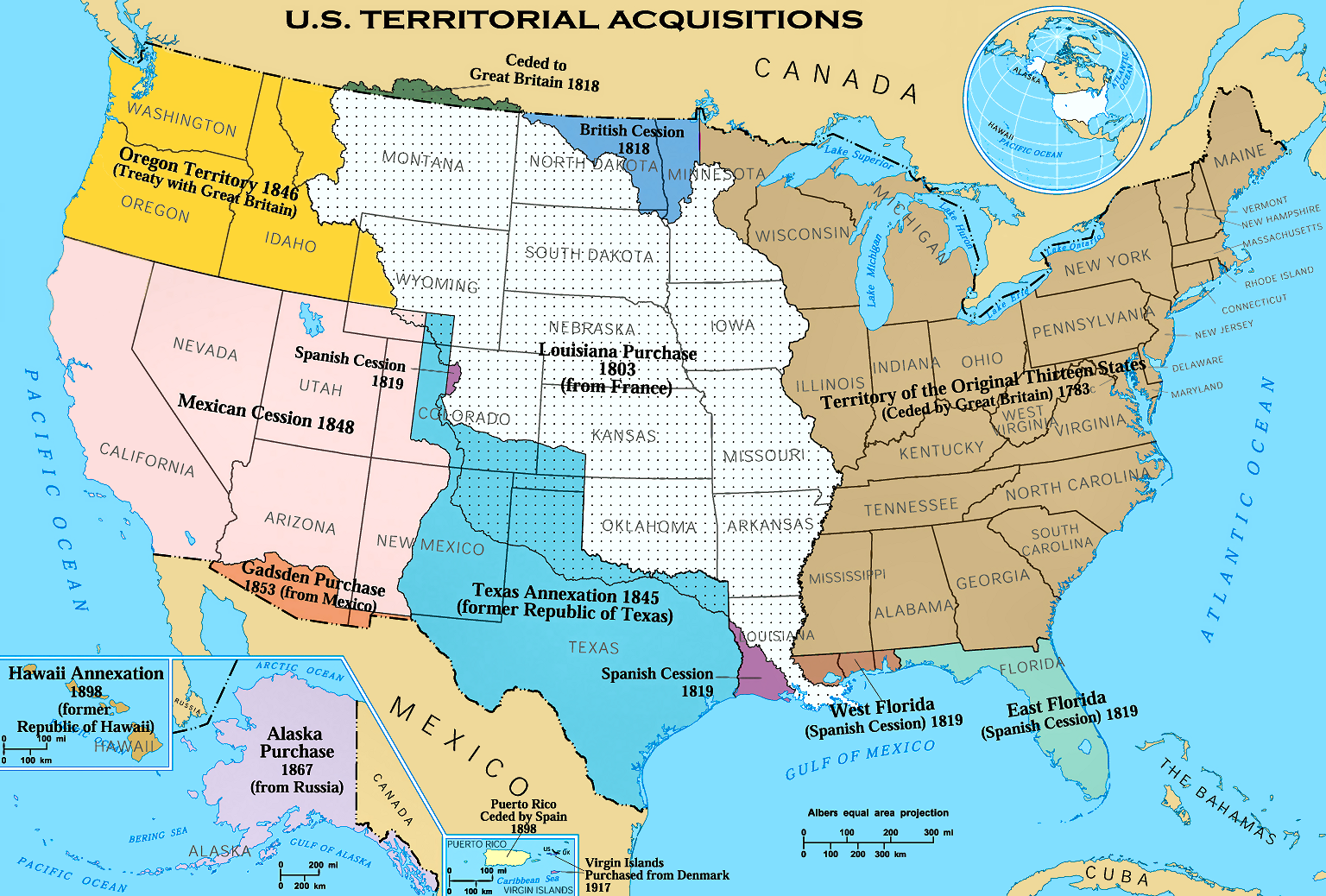
Territorial expansion of the United States

Another dispute occurred after Texas joined the Union. The treaty stated that the boundary between the French claims on the north and the Spanish claims on the south was Rio Roxo de Natchitoches (Red River) until it reached the 100th meridian, as noted on the John Melish map of 1818. But, the 100th meridian on the Melish map was marked some 90 miles (140 km) east of the true 100th meridian, and the Red River forked about 50 miles (80 km) east of the 100th meridian. Texas claimed the land south of the North Fork, and the United States claimed the land north of the South Fork (later called the Prairie Dog Town Fork Red River). In 1860, Texas organized the area as Greer County. The matter was not settled until a United States Supreme Court ruling in 1896 upheld federal claims to the territory, after which it was added to the Oklahoma Territory.

The treaty gave rise to a later border dispute between the states of Oregon and California, which remains unresolved. Upon statehood in 1850, California established the 42nd parallel as its constitutional de jure border as it had existed since 1819 when the territory was part of Spanish Mexico. In an 1868–1870 border survey following the admission of Oregon as a state, errors were made in demarcating and marking the Oregon-California border, creating a dispute that continues to this day.

In 2020, a hoax appeared in Spain according to which, in 2055, the Adams–Onís Treaty would expire and Florida would be returned to Spain by the United States, which is false.

The previous Anglo-American Convention of 1818 meant that both American and British citizens could settle land north of the 42nd parallel and west of the Continental Divide. The United States now had a firm foothold on the Pacific Coast and could commence settlement of the jointly occupied Oregon Country (known as the Columbia District to the British government). The Russian Empire also claimed this entire region as part of Russian America.

== See also ==
- Trienio Liberal

== Sources ==
- Cash, Peter Arnold (1999). The Adams–Onís Treaty Claims Commission: Spoliation and Diplomacy, 1795–1824 (PhD). University of Memphis.
- Crutchfield, James A.; Moutlon, Candy; Del Bene, Terry (2015). The Settlement of America: An Encyclopedia of Westward Expansion from Jamestown to the Closing of the Frontier. Routledge. ISBN 978-1-317-45461-8.
- Danver, Steven L. (2013). Encyclopedia of Politics of the American West. Sage Publications. ISBN 978-1-4522-7606-9.
- Deconde, Alexander (1978). A History of American Foreign Policy. Macmillan. ISBN 978-0684152790.
- Hämäläinen, Pekka (2008). The Comanche Empire. Yale University Press. ISBN 978-0-300-12654-9.
- Jones, Howard (2009). Crucible of Power: A History of American Foreign Relations to 1913. Rowman & Littlefield. p. 112. ISBN 978-0-7425-6453-4.
- Lynch, Michael (2013). The Oxford Encyclopedia of American Military and Diplomatic History. OUP US. ISBN 978-0-19-975925-5.
- Marshall, Thomas Maitland (1914). A history of the western boundary of the Louisiana Purchase, 1819–1841. Berkeley, University of California Press.
- Bailey, Hugh C. (1956). "Alabama's Political Leaders and the Acquisition of Florida" (PDF). Florida Historical Quarterly. 35 (1): 17–29. ISSN 0015-4113. Archived from the original (PDF) on 2008-12-04.
- Bemis, Samuel Flagg (1949). John Quincy Adams and the Foundations of American Foreign Policy. New York: A. A. Knopf., the standard history.
- Brooks, Philip Coolidge (1939). Diplomacy and the borderlands: the Adams–Onís Treaty of 1819.
- Warren, Harris G. "Textbook Writers and the Florida" Purchase" Myth." Florida Historical Quarterly 41.4 (1963): 325–331 online
- Weeks, William Earl (1992). John Quincy Adams and American Global Empire. Lexington, Kentucky: University Press of Kentucky. ISBN 0-8131-9058-4..

Sources

- Avalon Project – Treaty Text
- Text of the Adams–Onís Treaty
