= Treaty of Saint Petersburg (1825) =

1825 treaty between Russia and the United Kingdom

Convention Concerning the Limits of Their Respective Possessions on the Northwest Coast of America and the Navigation of the Pacific Ocean
- Signed: 28 February 1825
- Location: Saint Petersburg, Russian Empire
- Negotiators: Karl Nesselrode; Pyotr Ivanovich Poletika; Stratford Canning
- Parties: Russian Empire; United Kingdom
- Language: Russian, French

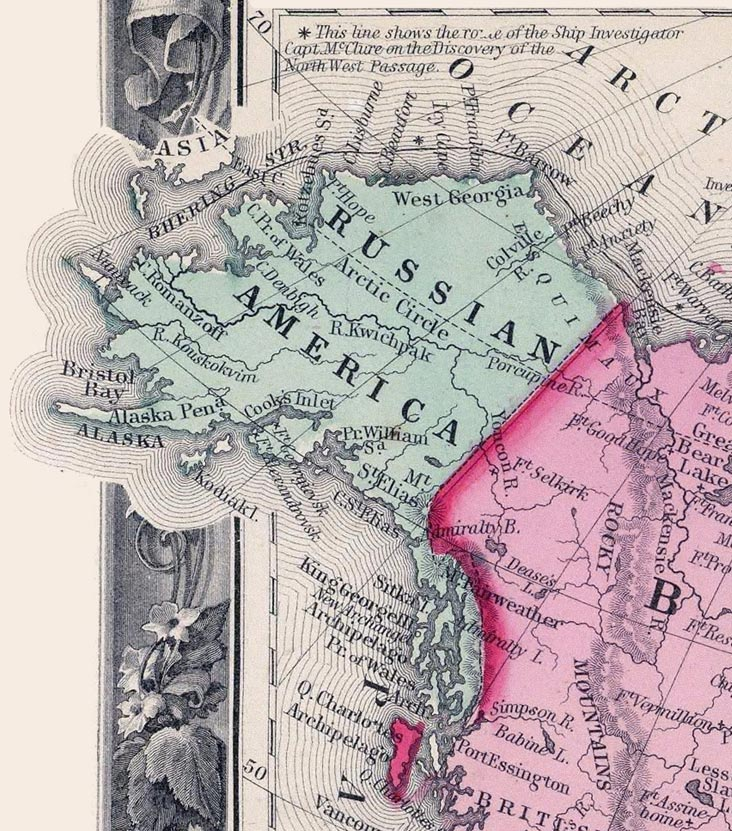
'Russian America' on a map

The Treaty of Saint Petersburg of 1825 or the Anglo-Russian Convention of 1825, officially the Convention Concerning the Limits of Their Respective Possessions on the Northwest Coast of America and the Navigation of the Pacific Ocean, defined the boundaries between Russian America and British claims and possessions of the Pacific Coast, and the later Yukon and Arctic regions of North America. It was agreed that along the coast at the southern tip of Prince of Wales island (now known as parallel 54°40′ north) northward to the 56 parallel, with the island wholly belonging to Russia, then to 10 marine leagues (56 km) inland going north and west to the 141st meridian west and then north to the "Frozen Ocean", the current Alaska/Canadian Yukon boundary, would be the boundary. The coastal limit had, the year before, been established as the limit of overlapping American claims in the parallel Russo-American Treaty of 1824. The Russian sphere in the region was later sold to the United States, eventually becoming the State of Alaska, while the British claim, along the coast to the south of parallel 54°40′ is now the coast of the Canadian province of British Columbia, and for inland regions it defined the western limit of what became the modern day Canadian territory of Yukon. It also defined associated rights and obligations concerning waters and ports in the region. The treaty, in establishing a vague division of coastal Russian interests and inland British interests between 56 and 60 degrees north latitude, led to conflicting interpretations of the meaning of the treaty's wording which later manifested in the Alaska Boundary Dispute between the United States on the one hand, and Canada (with Britain acting, in foreign affairs, on behalf of Canada) on the other.

Other terms of the treaty, including the right to navigation by British vessels to both commerce in the region affected, and also access to rivers crossing the designated coastal boundary, were exercised by the Hudson's Bay Company in 1834 but were met with opposition by then Russian-American Company Governor Wrangel in the form of warships and a blockade. This conflict, known as the Dryad affair, led to the RAC-HBC Agreement, in which the RAC agreed to lease the mainland coastal portion of the region south of Cape Spencer at the entrance to Cross Sound and the HBC promised to supply Russian America settlements with foodstuffs and manufactured goods. In addition the HBC waived its demand for payments for damages incurred during the Dryad affair. The same clauses enabled British access to the Stikine River goldfields in 1862 but were not assumed by the Americans upon their purchase of Russian interests in 1867, resulting in further conflict over British rights of access to the inland regions. The treaty's terms pertaining to the Arctic Ocean (referred to as the "Frozen Ocean" in the treaty) also played a part in the terms of the Bering Sea Arbitration and other decisions in Alaskan/US courts over marine and offshore interests.

== See also ==
- Stikine Territory
- North-Western Territory
- Atlin District
- Maritime fur trade
