= List of ambassadors of Russia to the United States =

Ambassador of Russia to the United States
- посол России в США
- Seal of the Russian Ministry of Foreign Affairs
- Incumbent; Vacant since November 11, 2026
- Ministry of Foreign Affairs
- Style: His Excellency
- Residence: Russian ambassador's residence in Washington, D.C.
- Appointer: President of Russia
- Term length: At the pleasure of the president
- Inaugural holder: Andrey Yakovlevich Dashkov; As ambassador of the Russian Empire
- Formation: August 17, 1808
- Final holder: Alexander Darchiev
- Succession: Charge d'affairs
- Website: Russian Embassy in Washington, D.C.

The Russian ambassador to the United States (Russian: Посол России в Соединённых Штатах) is the official representative of the president of the Russian Federation and the Russian government to the president of the United States and the United States government. The ambassador's official title is the ambassador extraordinary and plenipotentiary of the Russian Federation to the United States of America.

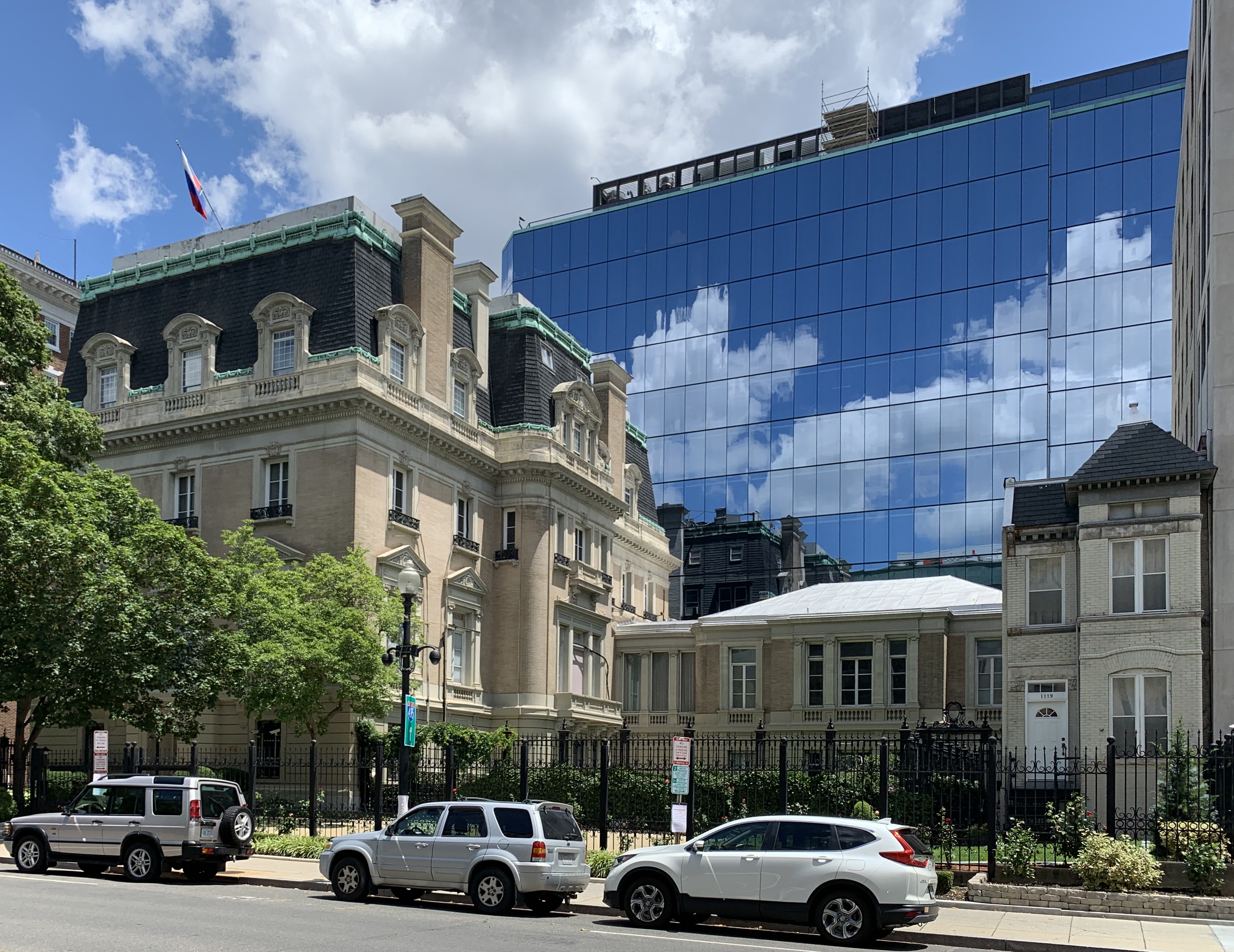
Russian ambassador's residence in Washington, D.C.

The ambassador and his staff work at large in the Embassy of Russia in Washington, D.C. The ambassador to the United States is concurrently appointed as the Russian representative to the Organization of American States. The ambassador's residence is located at 1125 16th Street Northwest. Russia also maintains consulates general in New York and Houston. The position is currently vacant. Alexander Darchiev is the latest ambassador, serving from March 6, 2025 until his death on November 11, 2026.

== List of Ambassadors ==
=== Russian Empire ===
List of ambassadors and ministers of the Russian Empire to the United States
Name	Photo	Residence	Appointed	Arrived	Exequatur	Until	Prior position	Later position
Andrey Yakovlevich Dashkov (as consul general and chargé d'affaires)		Philadelphia	June 20, 1808	July 1, 1809-07-01	July 15, 1809	August 17, 1811	None	None
Friedrich von der Pahlen (minister)		Washington, Philadelphia	April 13, 1809		June 26, 1810 (entered duty)	July 23, 1811	None	Minister to Portugal-Brazil
Andrey Yakovlevich Dashkov (as minister)		Washington	July 28, 1811		November 1811 (entered duty)	March 1819 (Note: The ukase recalling him was promulgated in 1817 but he remained chief of the Russian Legation until this time.)	None	None
Pyotr Ivanovich Poletika			1817			April 24, 1822	None	Foreign Ministry adviser
Fyodor van Tuyll van Serooskerken			April 19, 1823			April 11, 1826	Minister to Portugal-Brazil	None
Pavel Kridener			1827			1837	None	Minister to Switzerland
Alexander de Bodisco			1837			1854	Consul General in Stockholm	None
Alexander Medem			1854			1855		
Eduard de Stoeckl			1855			1869	Secretary of the U.S. Legation	None
Konstantin Katakazi			1869			1872	Foreign Ministry	None
Heinrich von Offenberg			1872			1875	Minister to Romania	None
Nicolai Pavlovich Shishkin			1875			1880	Minister to Serbia	Minister to Greece
Mikhail von Bartholomäi			1880			1882	Minister to Greece	Minister to Japan
Karl von Struve			1882			1892	Minister to Japan	Ambassador to the Netherlands
Grigory Kantakuzen			1892			1895	None	Minister to Wuerttemburg
Ernst Paul von Kotzebue			1895			1897	Minister to Wuerttemburg	None
Count Arthur Paul Nicholas Cassini			1898			1905	Minister to China	Ambassador to Spain
Roman Rosen			1905			1911	Minister to Japan	State Council
George Bakhmetev			1911			1917	Minister to Japan	None

=== Russian Provisional Government ===
Name	Photo	Appointed	Until
Boris Bakhmetev		1917	1917

=== Soviet Union ===
Name	Photo	Residence	Appointed	Credentials presented	Until
Maxim Litvinov			1918	1919	
Ludwig Martens			1919	1921	
Boris Skvirsky			1922	1933	
Alexander Troyanovsky			November 20, 1933	January 8, 1934	October 1, 1938
Konstantin Umansky			May 11, 1939 (as plenipotentiary representative)	May 9, 1941	November 5, 1941
Maxim Litvinov			November 10, 1941	December 8, 1941	August 22, 1943
Andrei Gromyko			August 22, 1943	October 4, 1943	April 11, 1946
Nikolai Vasilevich Novikov			April 11, 1946	June 3, 1946	October 25, 1947
Alexander Panyushkin			October 25, 1947	December 31, 1947	1952 June 12, 1952
Georgy Zarubin			June 14, 1952	September 25, 1952	1958 January 7, 1958
Mikhail A. Menshikov			January 7, 1958	February 11, 1958	January 4, 1962
Anatoly Dobrynin			January 4, 1962	March 30, 1962	May 19, 1986
Yuri Dubinin			May 19, 1986		May 15, 1990
Alexander Bessmertnykh			May 15, 1990		January 15, 1991
Viktor Komplektov			March 15, 1991		December 26, 1991

=== Russian Federation ===
Name	Photo	Appointed	Appointer	Credentials presented	Until
Viktor Komplektov		1991	Boris Yeltsin		1992
Vladimir Lukin		January 24, 1992	Boris Yeltsin		February 8, 1994
Yuli Vorontsov		July 23, 1994	Boris Yeltsin		December 16, 1998
Yuri Ushakov		1999	Boris Yeltsin	January 22, 1999	May 31, 2008
Sergey Kislyak		July 26, 2008	Dmitry Medvedev	September 16, 2008	July 22, 2017
Anatoly Antonov		September 1, 2017	Vladimir Putin	September 9, 2017	October 10, 2024
Alexander Darchiev		March 6, 2025	Vladimir Putin		November 11, 2026

== See also ==
- Embassy of Russia, Washington, D.C.
- List of ambassadors of the United States to Russia
- Russia–United States relations
- Soviet Union–United States relations
- Russian Empire–United States relations
- List of diplomatic missions of Russia
- Permanent Representative of Russia to the United Nations
- Permanent Mission of Russia to the United Nations

== Bibliography ==
- Saul, Norman E. (1996). "Appendix B: Russian Ministers and Ambassadors to the United States". Concord and Conflict: The United States and Russia, 1867–1914. Lawrence: University Press of Kansas. p. 595. ISBN 9780700607549.
- Saul, Norman E. (1991). "Appendix B: Russian Ministers to the United States, 1808–1867". Distant Friends: The United States and Russia, 1763–1867. Lawrence: University Press of Kansas. pp. 405–406. ISBN 0-7006-0438-3.
- Bashkina, Nina N.; et al. (1980). The United States and Russia: The Beginning of Relations, 1765–1815. Washington: United States Government Printing Office. LCCN 80-607939.
- Bashkina, Nina N.; et al. (1980b). "Russian Diplomatic and Consular Appointments to the United States, 1780–1815". The United States and Russia: The Beginning of Relations, 1765–1815. Washington: United States Government Printing Office. pp. 1111–1112. LCCN 80-607939.
