= Burckhard Alexius Constantin von Krüdener =

Burckhard Alexius Constantin von Krüdener, russified as Aleksey Ivanovich Kridener (Russian: Алексей Иванович Криденер; 12 September 1746 – 14 June 1802) was a Russian Imperial diplomat of noble Baltic German birth. Until 1784, Krüdener owned the Livonian estates of Kussen and Lubey.

== Life ==
He was born in Livonia into a Baltic-German noble family. His father Valentin von Krüdener was an oberstleutnant in the Swedish Army and counsellor in the Livonia landrat, whilst his mother was Margaretha Dorothea Gertruda von Trautvetter, of the Ramkau line. From 1764 he studied at the University of Leipzig and then entered the Russian diplomatic service. In 1771 he was a translator in Madrid then Warsaw. The following year he became legation secretary and in 1775 legation counsellor. On 25 August 1777 he married his second wife, Eva Maria Schick, at Neu Peblag, Livonia - he had had one child, Sophie, with his English first wife before divorcing her, and also divorced Schick.

In 1779 he nominated vice-president of the Justice College of Livonian and Estonian Affairs but not appointed to the post, instead becoming minister in Mitau from then until 1784. Catherine II of Russia next made him ambassador to the Republic of Venice. His third marriage was on 29 September 1782, in Riga, to Beate Barbara Juliane von Vietinghoff, with whom he had a son (Paul, named after Grand Duke Paul, on 31 January 1784) and a daughter (Juliette, in 1787).

In 1785 he became Russian envoy to Bavaria in Munich, then to Denmark in Copenhagen (1787–1794) and Spain in Madrid (1794–1797). When Catherine died in 1796 she was succeeded by Grand Duke Paul as Paul I and the same year Krüdener was appointed a Privy Counsellor. From 1800 until his death he was both a Privy Councillor but also Russian envoy to Frederick William III of Prussia's court in Berlin. The Vossische Zeitung on 19 February 1801 reported:

The festivities, which the Russian Imperial Envoy, Baron von Krüdener, held [at the Russian Embassy] on the 12th of this month in honour of his monarch's daughter, (Note: Grand Duchess Elena Pavlovna of Russia who from 27 January to 19 March that year visited the carnival in Berlin with her husband Frederick Louis of Mecklenburg-Schwerin.) were opened by a quadrille of 12 couples of dancers dressed in Greek costumes, performing a character dance, … and [these] were interspersed with appropriate French choruses. The music, by Kapellmeister Vincenzo Righini, was so well received that it had to be repeated towards the end of the celebration.

He died in Berlin aged 55 - according to Karl Robert von Nesselrode's autobiography Krüdener succumbed to a stroke whilst walking on Unter den Linden. Krüdener was buried in the churchyard of the Dorotheenstädtischen Kirche but the grave was lost when the church and cemetery were levelled in 1965, or possibly earlier.
