= Paul von Krüdener =

Russian diplomat (1784–1858)

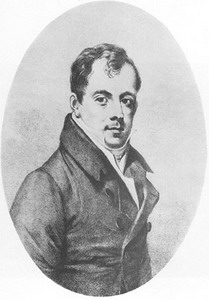

Russian ambassador to the United States
- In office 1827–1837
- Monarch: Nicholas I
- Preceded by: Diederik Tuyll van Serooskerken
- Succeeded by: Alexander de Bodisco

Personal details
- Born: Paul Ludwig von Krüdener; 31 January 1784 Saint Petersburg, Russia
- Died: 29 January 1858 (aged 73) Bern, Switzerland
- Spouse: Amalie Adlerberg
- Parent: Barbara von Krüdener (mother)

Paul Ludwig von Krüdener (Russian: Павел Алексеевич Криденер, romanized: Pavel Alekseyevich Kridener; 31 January 1784 – 29 January 1858) was a Russian diplomat of Baltic German extraction and the fourth Russian ambassador to the United States.

== Biography ==
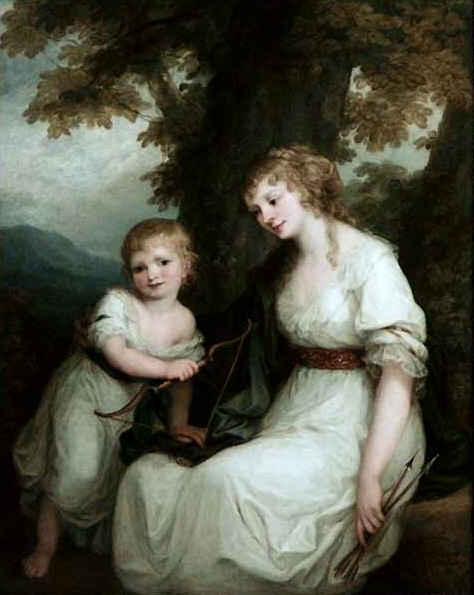
Paul with his mother in 1786

Krüdener was born on 31 January 1784, in Saint Petersburg. He was the son of Barbara von Krüdener, a Baltic German writer and mystic affiliated with the Friends of God. His father was Baron Burckhard Alexius Constantin von Krüdener, with whom Barbara did not have a good relationship. Pavel was baptized Paul in honor of Grand Duke (later Emperor) Paul I of Russia, his godfather.

His father was appointed by Catherine the Great as Ambassador to the Republic of Venice in 1785, and Pavel spent the first two years of his life there. He subsequently followed his father's assignments in Munich until 1787, Copenhagen until 1794 and finally Madrid until 1800. His father was then appointed by Paul I as Ambassador to Prussia, under Frederick William III of Prussia. Friedrich Ancillon, a prominent Prussian historian, became his tutor.

Paul von Krüdener became chargé d'affaires and embassy secretary in 1804 to Paris. He was arrested in Strasbourg by Napoleon I in 1812, on suspicion of conspiracy. In 1817, he went to Bern, where he invited his mother. It was in Bern that he married Margarethe König (1798–1859), the mother of his four children.

Krüdener was appointed Ambassador to the United States in 1827, and served until 1837. He was then transferred to Switzerland where he represented Russia's interests until his death.
