= Diederik Tuyll van Serooskerken =

Dutch nobleman (1772–1826)

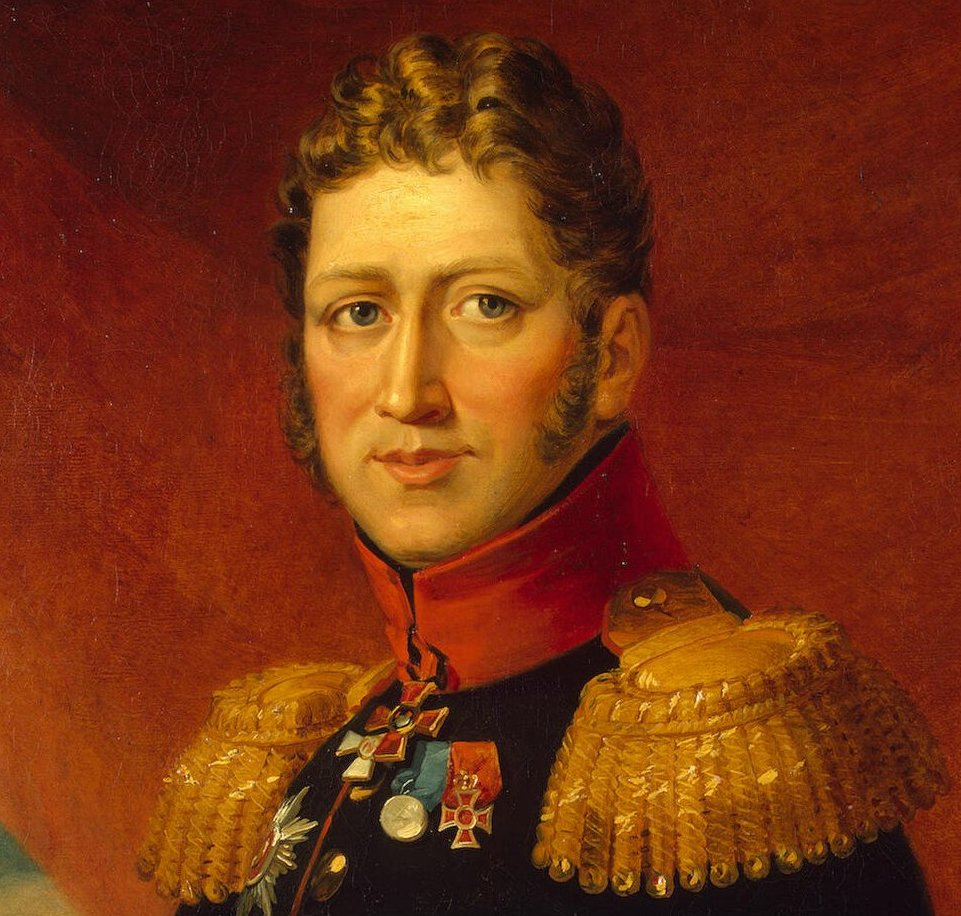
- Portrait by George Dawe

Russian ambassador to the United States
- In office 19 April 1823 – 11 April 1826
- Emperor: Alexander I Nicholas I
- Preceded by: Pyotr Ivanovich Poletika
- Succeeded by: Paul Ludwig von Krüdener

Personal details
- Born: Diederik Jacob van Tuyll van Serooskerken; 6 April 1772 The Hague, Dutch Republic
- Died: 11 April 1826 (aged 54) off Halifax, Nova Scotia
- Resting place: St. Peter's Cemetery, Halifax
- Spouse: Agnes Margaretha Fagel
- Awards: Order of St Anna, 1st Class; Order of St Vladimir, 3rd Class

Military service
- Allegiance: Russia
- Branch: Imperial Russian Army
- Service years: 1803–1826
- Rank: Major-general
- Wars: Napoleonic Wars

Diederik Jacob van Tuyll van Serooskerken (Russian: Fyodor Vasilyevich Teil van Seraskerken; 6 April 1772 – 11 April 1826) was a Dutch nobleman who served as a major general in the Imperial Russian Army, and later as the third Russian ambassador to the United States.

== Biography ==
Tuyll van Serooskerken was born on 6 April 1772, in The Hague. He served in the Dutch army until November 1803. He later joined the Imperial Russian Army and fought in the Napoleonic Wars as a major-general.

After the war, he served various diplomatic positions for Russia in the Kingdom of Naples and Holy See. On 19 April 1823, he was appointed by Emperor Alexander I of Russia as Russian ambassador to the United States. Tuyll was ambassador at a time when Russia was asserting claims to Alaska and the U.S. secretary of state John Quincy Adams was formulating what would come to be known as the Monroe Doctrine, portions of which were shown to Tuyll prior to their publication in an address to Congress. He served until 1826, and died on 11 April that same year during a sea voyage from his Washington posting.

He was buried in Halifax, Nova Scotia, in St. Peter's Cemetery, in April 1826. His grave is unmarked and lies under a parking lot built atop the cemetery.
