= Andrey Yakovlevich Dashkov =

Russian diplomat (1775–1831)

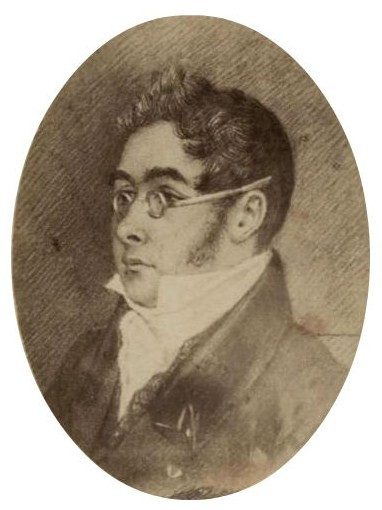

1st Russian Ambassador to the United States
- In office 1808–1817
- Monarch: Alexander I
- Preceded by: Office established
- Succeeded by: Pyotr Ivanovich Poletika

Personal details
- Born: 23 March [O.S. 12 March] 1775 St. Petersburg, Russian Empire
- Died: 5 July 1831 (aged 56) Stockholm, Sweden
- Profession: Diplomat

Andrey Yakovlevich Dashkov (Russian: Андрей Яковлевич Дашков; 23 March [O.S. 12 March] 1775 – 5 July [O.S. 23 June] 1831) was a Russian diplomat and the first Russian ambassador to the United States.

== Career ==
He was born in 1775 in St. Petersburg.

In 1807, diplomatic relations were formally established between the Russian Empire and the United States, and in 1808, he was appointed by Emperor Aleksandr I as the Russian consul general and chargé d'affaires to the United States. He arrived in Philadelphia in the same year, was later appointed ambassador, and served until 1817.

During the War of 1812, the White House door keeper gave Ambassador Dashkov the key to the White House as the American government fled the capital city.

He died on June 21, 1831, in Stockholm.
