= Russo-American Treaty of 1824 =

1824 treaty between Russia and the United States

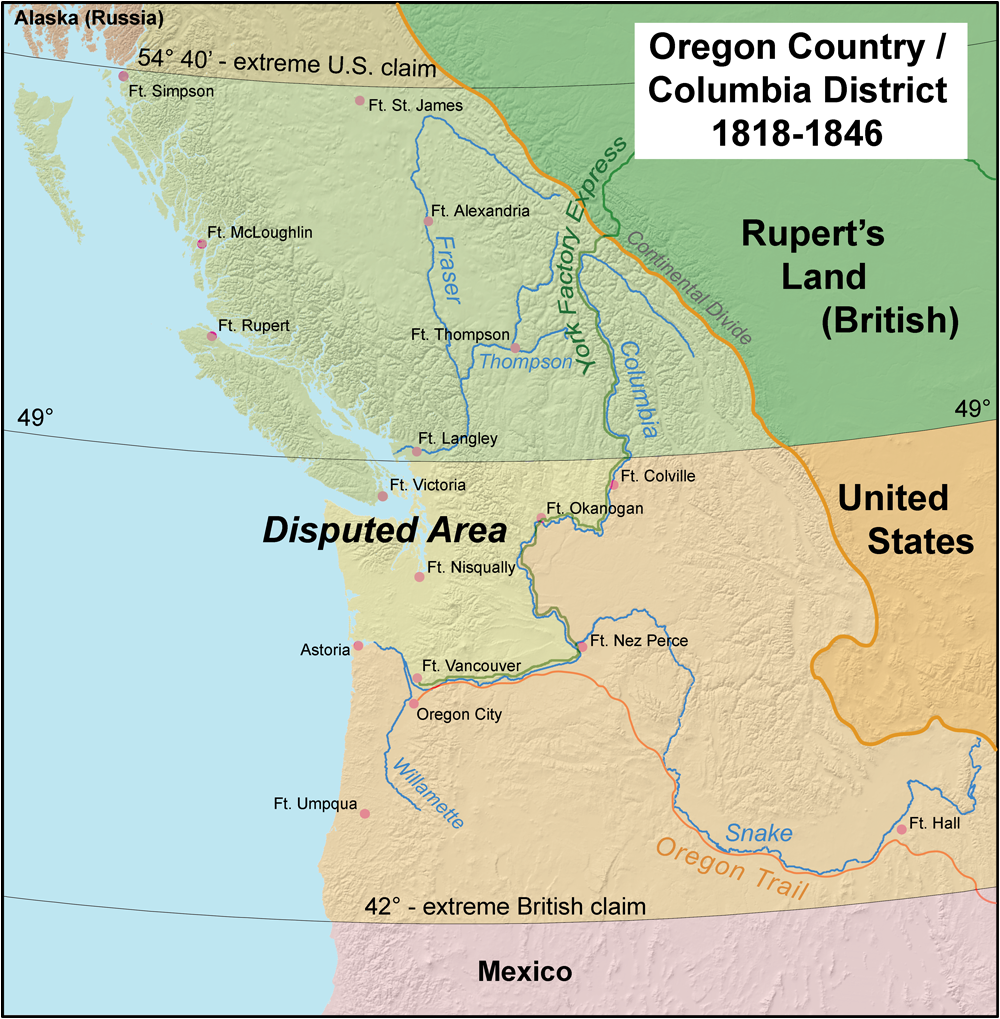
Russian claims settled to their Alaskan territory with the 1824 and 1825 treaties, reducing the scope of the dispute over Oregon to Britain and the United States.

The Russo-American Treaty of 1824 (also known as the Convention of 1824) was signed in St. Petersburg between representatives of Russia and the United States on April 17, 1824, ratified by both nations on January 11, 1825 and went into effect on January 12, 1825. The accord contained six articles. It gave Russian claims on the Pacific Northwest coast of North America south of parallel 54°40′ north (over what Americans had known as the Oregon Country) to the U.S.

The Anglo-Russian Treaty of 1825 between Russia and Great Britain then fixed the Russian Tsar's southernmost boundary of Alaska at the line of 54°40′N, the present southern tip of the Alaska Panhandle, but Russian rights to trade in the area south of that latitude remained. The Oregon dispute between the United States and Britain over jurisdiction in the region was already underway as a result of the Adams–Onís Treaty between the U.S. and Spain over the latter's former claims north of the 42nd Parallel (today's Oregon-California boundary).

The 1824 treaty was signed by Karl Nesselrode (mentioned in the treaty as "Charles de Nesselrode", Russia's foreign minister), Henry Middleton representing the U.S., and Pyotr Ivanovich Poletika (mentioned in the document as "Pierre de Poletica") representing the Russian Empire.

== See also ==
- List of treaties
- Oregon boundary dispute
- Alaska Boundary Dispute
- Russian colonization of the Americas
- Maritime Fur Trade
