= St. Peter's Cemetery (Halifax, Nova Scotia) =

St. Peter’s Cemetery
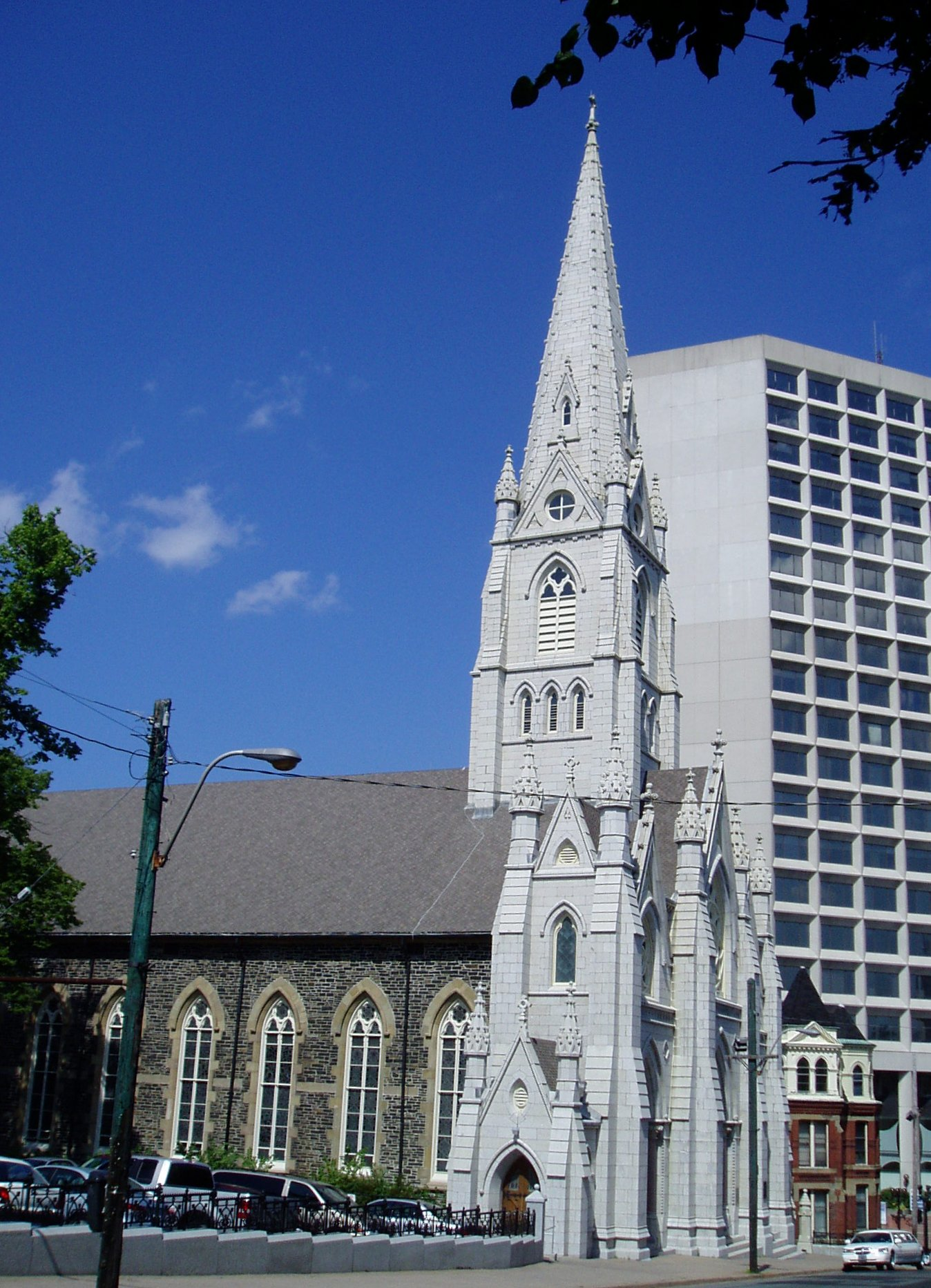
- St. Peter’s Cemetery, to left of basilica under parking lot
- Interactive map of St. Peter’s Cemetery

Details
- Established: 1784
- Location: Halifax, Nova Scotia
- Country: Canada
- Coordinates: 44°38′39″N 63°34′25″W
- Type: Closed
- Owned by: Roman Catholic Archdiocese of Halifax-Yarmouth
- No. of graves: 3,000

St. Peter's Cemetery, later St. Mary's Cemetery, is the oldest Catholic cemetery in Halifax, Nova Scotia, containing an estimated 3,000 graves dating from 1784 until 1843. It is located in Downtown Halifax at the corner of Spring Garden Road and Grafton Street under a parking lot beside the St. Mary's Basilica and owned by the Roman Catholic Archdiocese of Halifax-Yarmouth.

== History ==
The cemetery was created following passage of the 1783 Nova Scotia Catholic Relief Act which legalized land titles held by Roman Catholics and repealed penalties against Roman Catholic priests. The law allowed Halifax Catholics to build St. Peter's chapel in downtown Halifax and establish a cemetery on consecrated ground beside the church.

Records for the first two decades of the cemetery have been lost, but burial records from 1801 onwards detail the interments of 2,578 men, women and children until the cemetery was closed in 1843. A conservative estimate of deaths for the first 20 years of the cemetery brings the total to 3,000 graves.

The St. Peter's church and cemetery was renamed St. Mary's cemetery in 1833. St. Peter's was then adopted as the name for the Roman Catholic church and cemetery in nearby Dartmouth. The cemetery closed in 1843 when the Holy Cross Cemetery opened. A small number of burials were moved from St. Peter's/St. Mary's to be reburied at the Holy Cross Cemetery.

Air photographs show some stone markers remained in the cemetery until the 1920s. The cemetery was paved over in the 1950s to serve as a parking lot. The markers were buried, although a few may have been moved to the Holy Cross Cemetery. One marker remained visible until the 1970s, an 18th-century carved depiction of Adam and Eve embedded in the parking lot asphalt. It was excavated out of the pavement in the 1970s to become part of the collection of the Nova Scotia Museum. Today the cemetery remains used as a paid parking lot. No monument or signage identify the cemetery or the thousands who are buried there.

In June 2012, the Archdiocese of Halifax-Yarmouth announced a possible development on the cemetery site in partnership with the developer Joe Ramia, a large housing and commercial complex to be built on the site of the cemetery and called "Cathedral Centre". The development raised concerns about the fate of the estimated 3,000 graves in the historic cemetery.

== Interments ==
Analysis of the burial records at St. Peter's show the majority of burials (907 burials) were Irish immigrants, including many soldiers (257 burials) in the British army. The cemetery also contains African (17 burials) and Mi'kmaw burials (4 recorded burials).

=== Notable Interments ===
- Pierre Maillard, Catholic missionary, linguist and advisor to the Mi'kmaq people and Acadians during the challenging years of the Seven Years' War and the Expulsion of the Acadians. Initially buried in 1762 in the Old Burying Ground on Barrington Street, his body was moved across the street to the St. Peter's Cemetery after it opened in 1784.
- Baron de Tuyll, the Russian Ambassador to the United States, buried at St. Peter's in April 1826 after he fell ill on a sea voyage from the United States.
