= David M. Pletcher =

American historian (1920–2004)

- Born: June 14, 1920; Faribault, Minnesota, US
- Died: February 22, 2004 (aged 83); Bloomington, Indiana, US
- Resting place: Maple Lawn Cemetery, Faribault, Minnesota; 44.289680°N 93.299411°W
- Occupation: Historian
- Years active: 1944–1990
- Known for: Latin American historical scholarship

Academic background
- Education: B.A., History, University of Chicago, 1941; M.A., History, University of Chicago, 1941; Ph.D., History, University of Chicago, 1946

Academic work
- Discipline: United States / Latin American history
- Institutions: Indiana University
- Notable works: Rails, Mines, and Progress: Seven American Promoters in Mexico

David Mitchell Pletcher (June 14, 1920 – February 22, 2004) was an American historian, considered an expert in his field. He was a history professor at Indiana University from 1965 to 1990.

== Biography ==
Pletcher was born June 14, 1920, in Faribault, Minnesota He attended the University of Chicago, earning three degrees in history: a B.A. and an M.A. in 1941, and a Ph.D. in 1946.

Pletcher's initial academic post was as a history instructor at the University of Iowa, from 1944 to 1946. He served as an associate professor, first at Knox College from 1946 to 1956, then at Hamline University from 1956 to 1965. In 1965 he joined Indiana University as a full professor; he remained there until his retirement in 1990.

Pletcher served as an advisor for the 1999 PBS documentary U.S.-Mexican War (1846–1848).

He was a member of the Organization of American Historians and the American Historical Association, as well as the Society for Historians of American Foreign Relations, where he served as vice president in 1979 and president in 1980.

Pletcher died February 22, 2004, in Bloomington, Indiana.

== Awards ==
In 1957, the American Historical Association awarded Pletcher the Albert J. Beveridge Award, given for the best book in English on the history of the United States, Latin America, or Canada from 1492 to the present, for his book Rails, Mines, and Progress: Seven American Promoters in Mexico. In 1961, he received a McKnight Foundation Award.

== Notable works ==
- Pletcher, David M. (1958). Rails, Mines, and Progress: Seven American Promoters in Mexico, 1867-1911. Ithaca, New York: Cornell University Press. OCLC 237975.
- ——— (1962). The Awkward Years; American Foreign Relations under Garfield and Arthur. Columbia, Missouri: University of Missouri Press. OCLC 558705173.
- ——— (1973). The Diplomacy of Annexation; Texas, Oregon, and the Mexican War. Columbia, Missouri: University of Missouri Press. ISBN 9780826201355.
- ——— (1998). The Diplomacy of Trade and Investment: American Economic Expansion in the Hemisphere, 1865-1900. Columbia, Missouri: University of Missouri Press. ISBN 9780826211279.
- ——— (2001). The Diplomacy of Involvement: American Economic Expansion Across the Pacific, 1784-1900. Columbia, Missouri: University of Missouri Press. ISBN 9780826213150.
