= Pyotr Ivanovich Poletika =

Russian ambassador

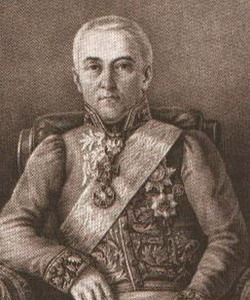

2nd Russian ambassador to the United States
- In office 1817 – 24 April 1822
- Monarch: Alexander I
- Preceded by: Andrey Yakovlevich Dashkov
- Succeeded by: Diederik Tuyll van Serooskerken

Personal details
- Born: 15 August 1778 Vasylkiv, Kiev Governorate
- Died: 26 January 1849 (aged 70) St. Petersburg, Russia
- Resting place: Volkovo Cemetery

Pyotr Ivanovich Poletika (Russian: Пётр Иванович Полетика; 15 August 1778 – 26 January 1849, occasionally referred to in the West as Pierre de Poletica) was the second Russian ambassador to the United States.

== Biography ==
Poletika was born in 1778 and enjoyed an aristocratic education. His father Ivan Poletika (1722—1783) was a medical scientist. His mother was of Turkish origin.

He served in various diplomatic posts and was a senator. From 1817 to 1822, he was the Russian ambassador to the United States.

He died in 1849, and his memoirs were published posthumously in 1885.

== See also ==
- Russo-American Treaty of 1824
