= Seward's Day =

Alaskan holiday

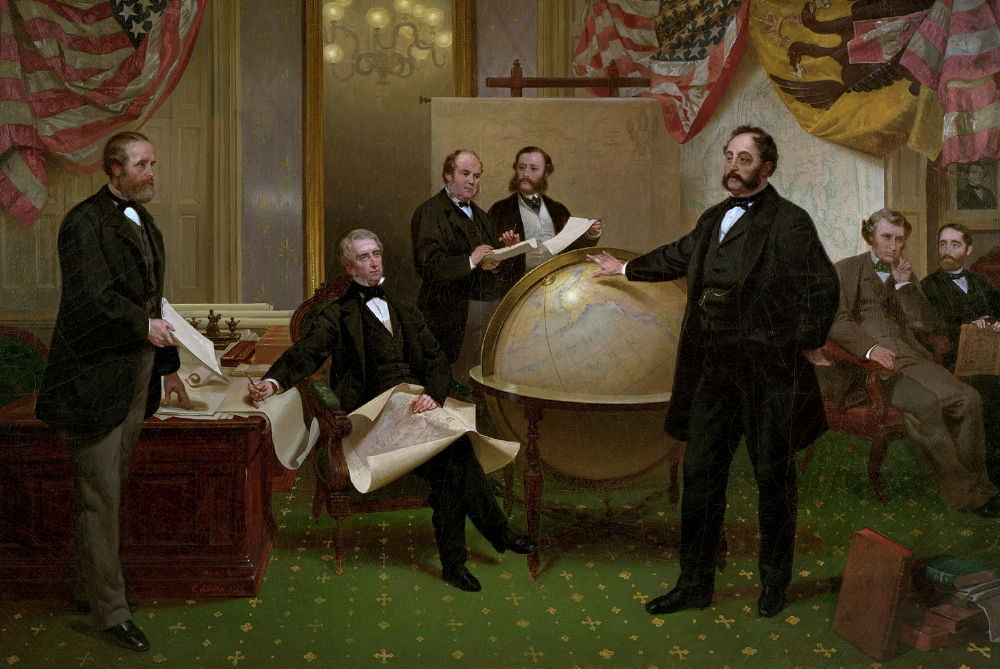
- Signing of the Alaska Treaty
- Observed by: Alaskans
- Significance: Signing of the Alaska Purchase treaty
- Date: Last Monday in March
- 2025 date: March 31
- 2026 date: March 30
- 2027 date: March 29
- 2028 date: March 27
- Frequency: annual
- Related to: Alaska Day

Seward's Day is a legal holiday in the U.S. state of Alaska. This holiday falls on the last Monday in March and commemorates the signing of the Alaska Purchase treaty on March 30, 1867. It is named for then-Secretary of State William H. Seward, who negotiated the purchase from Russia. It was declared a holiday in the Territory of Alaska on March 30, 1917.

It should not be confused with Alaska Day, which marks the formal transfer of control over Alaska from Russia to the United States.
