= Simon Albrecht Poppe =

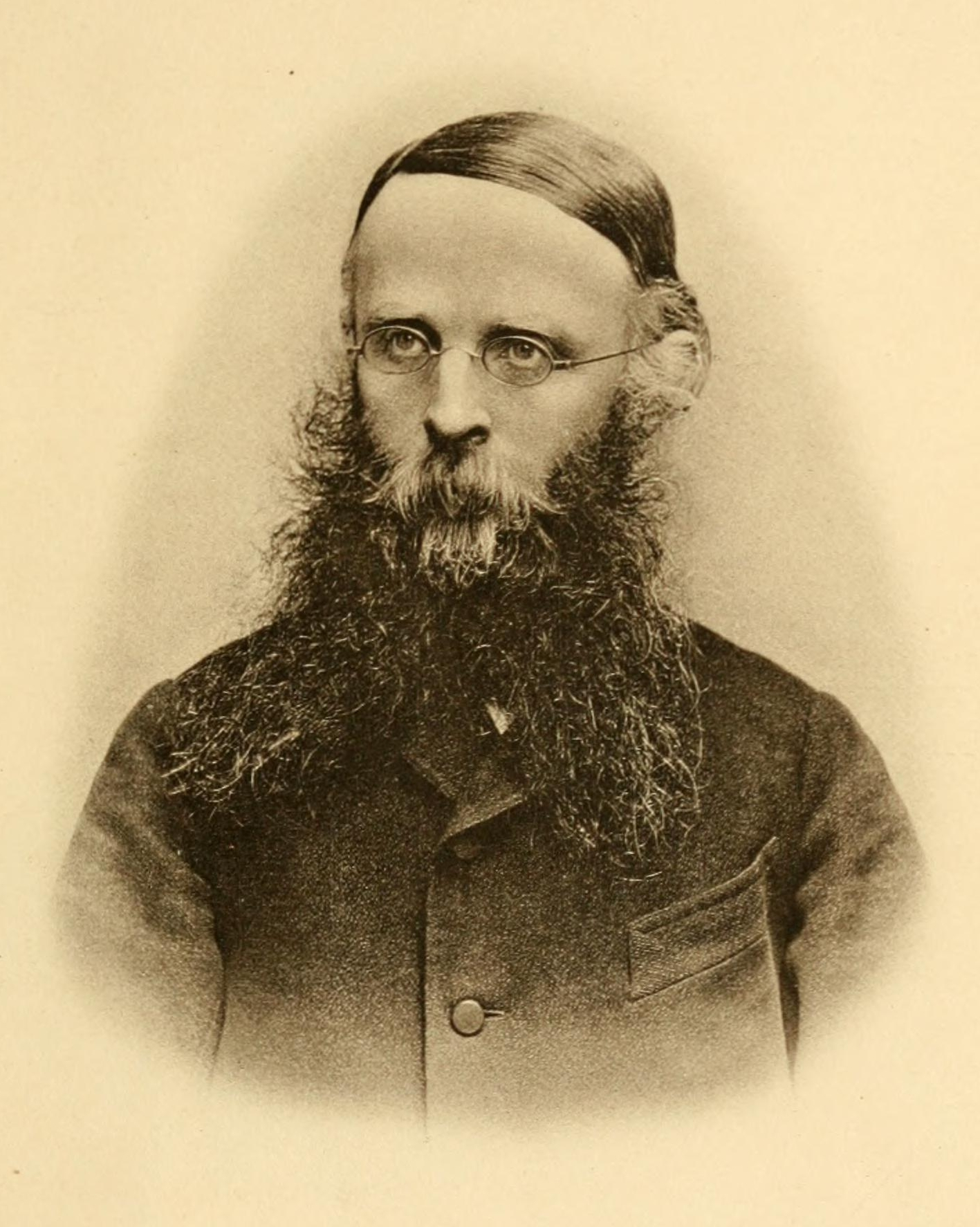

Simon Albrecht Poppe (8 June 1847 – 17 February 1907) was a German zoologist and naturalist. Unable to complete formal studies due to poor health, he privately conducted research, particularly on the arthropod ectoparasites of birds and mammals.

== Life and work ==
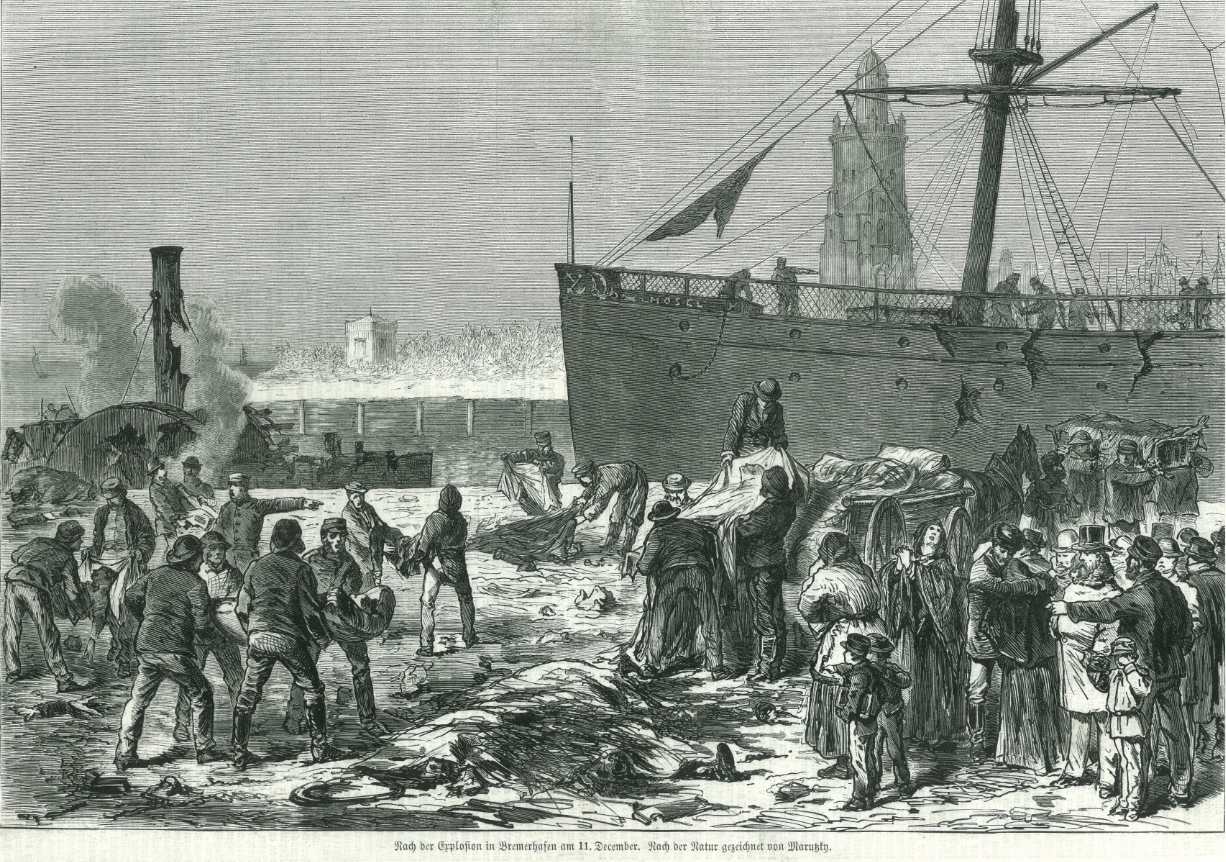
The SS Mosel after the bomb-blast, 1875

Poppe was born in Vegesack where his father, shipping captain Georg (Schorse) Poppe (1818–1875), passed on an interest in natural history early in his life. His father brought specimens from his travels and an uncle Alfred Ludwig (Blasius) Poppe worked in Valparaiso for the natural history company of Godeffroy. His mother Margarete Jaburg cared for him most of the time when the father was away and he was educated first at Vegesack and when the parents moved to Bremen he went to the grammar school there. In 1868 the family moved to Bremerhaven where he recovered from a nervous breakdown. He then joined the University of Tübingen in 1868 to study medicine. He attended the classes of Emil Dursy, Leydig and Hegelmaier. In 1870 he volunteered for military service with the 1st Hanseatic Infantry Regiment in Bremen but he was declared unfit with a chronic heart defect. He again suffered from poor health and after a break he went to the University of Göttingen but he finally was forced to quit studies. His father who was then working with Lloyds was bringing natural history specimens from around the world and he began to put together a large collection of echinoderms and molluscs. He researched the molluscs of the Lower Weser but he never published. His first scholarly work was published in 1872 on housemarks. He also examined prehistoric stone axes and remains with a Jürgens whose collection came to Poppe later. He published on the flint axes of the region in 1879. He also acquired many Chinese objects that had gone into trade after being stolen from the Chinese emperor during the 1867 revolution. On December 11, 1875 his father was aboard the Lloyd Steamer SS Mosel at Bremerhaven port when an explosion killed many people including his father. The explosion known as the Thomas Disaster had been engineered by Alexander Keith Jr. as part of an insurance fraud but the timing device of the bomb went off prematurely during the loading of the ship. The accident happened just across their home in Bremerhaven and the family moved away to Bremen to overcome memories of the loss. In Bremen he joined the national association and the historical society and came into contact with G. W. Focke, W. O. Focke, Buchenau, Otto Finsch and Friedrich Brüggemann. In 1877 he had recommended the Übersee-Museum to purchase the collections of his neighbour Stelling who also worked in the Norddeutsche Lloyd. Poppe was given the task of examining an ethnographic collection that came in from Costa Rica and he took up ethnographic work from 1878. Appointed in October he began to catalogue the holdings and he began a card catalogue which grew to about 1700 entries. This was however short-lived and he quit in 1879 after disputes over his responsibilities with the director Hubert Ludwig. He then began to work on crustaceans with encouragement from Brüggemann and Hermann Rehberg.

Poppe married Emma (1846–1939), daughter of Vegesack-based entomologist Fischer, in 1882. Several of his in-laws were interested in natural history and he began to take a special interest in parasites. In 1883 he moved along with his mother to Vegesack. His health improved. He began to study copepods from around the world as well birdlice and feather mites. He also examined the parasites of local small mammals. He also compiled bibliographies of zoology. His studies, made privately were often slow and he published at leisure or was dissuaded when others produced quality publications in his areas of interest. His parasite slides were acquired by Baron Rothschild. The springtail Sminthurus poppei Reuter, 1885 was named in his honour.
