= Konstantin Katakazi =

Russian diplomat (1830–1890)

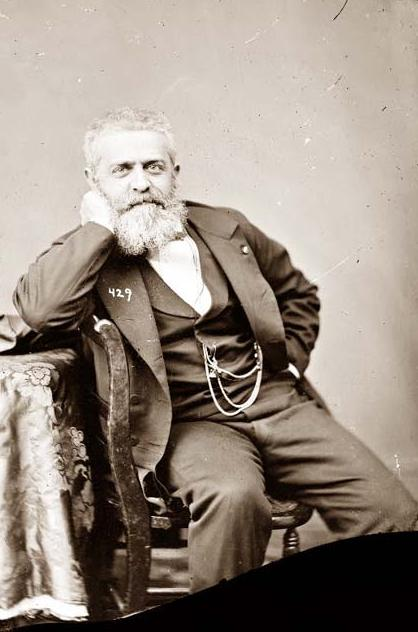

Konstantin Gavrilovich Catacazy or Katakazi (Константин Гаврилович Катакази) (1830 - 1 April 1890) was a Russian diplomat of the 19th century, minister plenipotentiary of the Russian Empire to the United States.

== Family background ==
The Katakazi family was a Russian aristocratic family of Phanariotes, of Greek descent. Anton Katakazi, the patriarch of the family emigrated with his sons to Russia in 1807. The Katakazis were big landowners in the eastern part of the Principality of Moldavia, which was transferred to Russia the Treaty of Bucharest (1812). The family is mentioned in the catalogue of aristocratic families from the Bessarabia Governorate.

Anton Katakazi's two sons got involved in Russian politics. The older son, Konstantin Antonovich Katakazi (1775–1826) was governor of Bessarabia from 1818 to 1825. Married to a princess Ypsilantis, Konstantin actively supported the Greek secret society Filiki Eteria and the military action of Alexander Ypsilantis in Moldavia and Wallachia. The younger son, Gavriil Antonovich Katakazi, became a Russian diplomat. His main assignment was legate of the Russian Empire to king Otto of Greece. Eventually Gavriil was named senator of the Russian Empire.

== Beginning of diplomatic activity ==
Konstantin Gavrilovich Catacazy intended to follow his father's career and entered the staff of the Russian Ministry of Foreign Affairs. At the beginning of 1865, Konstantin Catacazy wrote a memorandum to Prince Alexander Mikhailovich Gorchakov, State Chancellor of the Russian Empire in which he outlined a plan for a Russian mediation in the American Civil War. In his memorandum Catacazy argued that both North and South regarded Russia as a special friend. This assumption was not necessarily correct as the Russian fleet had shown its support for the Union, to prevent the British intervention on the part of the Confederation. In its conclusion, the memorandum indicated that it was Russia's interest to see the Union restored as a balance the United Kingdom.

Gorchakov's comment was favorable but he took no decision on the matter and sent a copy of the memorandum to Eduard Andreevich Stoeckl, minister plenipotentiary of the Russian Empire in Washington, leaving it wholly to Stoeckl's judgment and discretion to act upon the plan. A mediation a month before the fall of Richmond was however not an option.

After having negotiated the Alaska Purchase Stoeckl resigned for health reasons in 1869. Vladimir Andreevich Bodisko, former agent of the Russian-American Company was appointed as care-taker of the Russian legation in Washington Gorchakov suggested the appointment of Catacazy as minister plenipotentiary to the United States. Although Tsar Alexander II of Russia had some reservations regarding this nomination, he finally gave in to the chancellor's suggestion. During his appointment ceremony, Alexander II told Catacazy: "Your instructions are very short and clear. You have constantly to remember that the American people are our best friend"

== Mission to the United States ==
Konstantin Catacazy arrived in Washington in late 1869. His diplomatic background was, however, mainly linked to the diplomatic relations of Russia with the Balkan States, where Russian envoys were frequently involved in intrigues in order to influence the internal policies of countries in which they were accredited. Catacazy tried to use the same diplomacy in the United States. He resisted a personal claim of an American citizen against Russia trying to force through various methods to withdraw his claim. During the negotiations which were in progress through the British and American Joint High Commission for the settlement of the Alabama claims, Catacazy made free use of the newspapers in an attempt to prejudice and defeat the negotiations. He also attempted to influence the decision of various members of Congress. Secretary of State Hamilton Fish warned him repeatedly that his conduct was not acceptable, but he continued his actions. Catacazy became personally abusive of the President and members of his Cabinet and denied any guilt when confronted with his acts.

=== Diplomatic tensions between Russia and the United States ===
Finally the situation seemed completely out of control and President Ulysses S. Grant instructed Secretary of State Fish to request the Government of Russia to recall minister Catacazy. The letter to the Russian Ministry of Foreign Affairs stated:

"On his arrival at Washington, Catacazy gave the promise of being a useful and very acceptable Minister, and made a very agreeable impression. Soon however he began to make himself very officious, interfering in questions not appropriately connected with his Legation and in those pending before Congress, importuning Senators and Representatives and resorting to personal interviews and solicitations unusual on the part of representatives of other powers accredited to this government, distasteful and annoying to the legislators thus indecorously approached and tending to embarrass the free course of legislation on the subjects with respect to which his interference was obtruded. He did not hesitate to use the newspapers of the country to influence public opinion on questions pending before the Government and indulged in much license in his denunciation of measures and individuals. In his conversation he was even more severe and unrestrained and employed abusive and vituperative language toward very many persons, including several in public positions and enjoying the respect and confidence of the community. The impropriety of a foreign Minister thus attempting to influence and to misdirect the public opinion of the country must be admitted as sufficient ground for his ceasing to be a proper agent between the Government which he represents and that to which he is accredited"

This letter was conveyed to the Russian Ministry of Foreign Affairs by Jeremiah Curtin minister plenipotentiary of the United States to Russia on 16 June 1871. The timing was extremely sensitive as a high-profile visit of Grand Duke Alexei Alexandrovich, the tsar's second son had been scheduled for the fall, and the presence of a Russian minister plenipotentiary during the visit was absolutely necessary. However, under the pretext that Chancellor Gorchakoff, the only person who could take a decision on the matter, was in Germany, the Russian Government delayed action. On 18 August, the United States reiterated the request, insisting that the issue be solved before the visit of Grand Duke Alexei. The Russian Government finally responded, requesting that minister Catacazy be tolerated until after the presentation of the Grand Duke to the President, after which his assignment would be immediately terminated. This response was a diplomatic blunder. As, according to protocol, the Russian minister plenipotentiary was supposed to introduce the Grand Duke, it forced President Grant to receive him, though he had been officially declared "persona non grata".

While the visit of the Grand Duke in America was generally considered a success, his reception at the White House in Washington was extremely short. His meeting with President Grant, which Konstantin Catacazy attended, lasted only 15 minutes, during which the Grand Duke addressed himself especially to Mrs. Grant. The entire visit in Washington only one day. No formal entertainment was given in Washington to the Grand Duke, though for all other visits of members of royal families to the White House, formal dinners had been organized. Such dinners had taken place when President John Tyler received François d'Orléans, prince de Joinville, when Abraham Lincoln received Prince Napoléon Joseph Bonaparte and even when Ulysses Grant received Kamehameha V, king of the Sandwich Islands. President Grant's displeasure with the delay in Catacazy's recall was evident and, under the circumstances, sitting at the same dinner table with Catacazy was unacceptable. Therefore, the reception of the Grand Duke at the White House was rather a blow for the Russian diplomacy even though at that time the US did not matter in world politics. There had been expectations that a treaty between the United States and Russia would be signed during the meeting. As the terms of such an agreement would have had to be negotiated by the State Department with the Russian minister before the meeting, no such agreement was signed.

On 26 November 1871, Catacazy informed the State Department that General Alexander Gorloff, the military attaché, would take charge of the Russian Imperial Legation in Washington

== President Grant's comments ==
The diplomatic tension generated by Catacazy's attitude had been so intense, that President Grant considered it necessary to inform Congress about the conflict in a special message. The contents were repeated in the President's Third State of the Union Address

"The intimate friendly relations which have so long existed between the United States and Russia continue undisturbed. The visit of the third son of the Emperor is a proof that there is no desire on the part of his Government to diminish the cordiality of those relations. The hospitable reception which has been given to the Grand Duke is a proof that on our side we share the wishes of that Government. The inexcusable course of the Russian minister at Washington rendered it necessary to ask his recall and to decline to longer receive that functionary as a diplomatic representative. It was impossible, with self-respect or with a just regard to the dignity of the country, to permit Mr. Catacazy to continue to hold intercourse with this Government after his personal abuse of Government officials, and during his persistent interferences, through various means, with the relations between the United States and other powers. In accordance with my wishes, this Government has been relieved of further intercourse with Mr. Catacazy, and the management of the affairs of the imperial legation has passed into the hands of a gentleman entirely unobjectionable."

Konstantin Catacazy left the United States, but that did not finish his intrigues. In 1872, he published a book in Paris about his conflict with the Government of the United States. Entitled A Diplomatic Incident, it was conceived as a letter addressed to Chief Justice Salmon Portland Chase. The Supreme Court did not respond. For the United States the conflict had ended once Catacazy had been recalled.

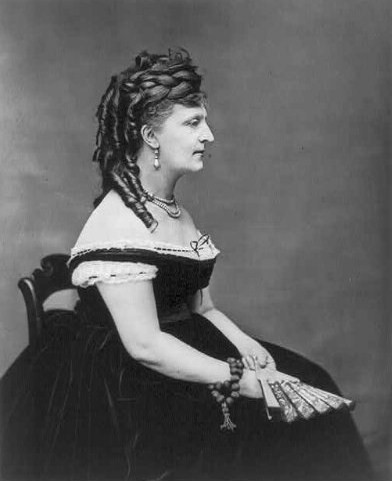
Olga Katakazi, previously Duchess of Santa Severina
