= Heinrich Fahrenholz =

German zoologist

Heinrich Fahrenholz (July 27, 1882 – October 28, 1945) was a German teacher, zoologist, and politician. He studied the evolution of parasites and is best known for the eponymous Fahrenholz Rule which states that the phylogeny of obligate parasites mirrors the phylogeny of their hosts.

Fahrenhoz was the son of a teacher and sexton in Achim near Bremen. After studying locally he too became a teacher in Lesum in 1902. He started research on mites after being encouraged by the zoologist Simon Albrecht Poppe in Vegesack. This was however interrupted by military service and then he returned to teach in Bierden and from 1909 as a teacher at the Hanover prison. He studied during this period at the veterinary college and in 1913 he qualified to teach in middle school and moved to Hildesheim. He was however able to take up the position only after the end of World War I and during this period he became politically active and was involved in the SPD in Hildesheim. He quit teaching and took up a position as senator of the city of Hildesheim. In 1933 he was dismissed from this position.

He then lived in Wehningen and Quelkhorn and returned to Achim in 1936 where he returned to work on the Anoplura. His most important work was on the coevolution of hosts and parasites. He suggested a rule that is known as Fahrenholz rule that essentially stated that the phylogeny of obligate parasites reflects the phylogeny of their hosts. This was however used by some to create very narrow species limits and assign parasites with species status with the assumption that each species of host has their own unique parasite species.

After 1945 he was rehabilitated and made district administrator for Rotenburg (Hannover) but he suffered shortly after from a heart attack and died later in Achim. His collections of parasite slide preparations are held at the Institute for Medical and Agricultural Biology at Celle.

Apart from zoology, Fahreholz founded the Deutsch-Republikanischen Reichsbunds in 1924 and wrote a book of republican songs in 1925. A street in Achim is named after him and the louse genus Fahrenholzia honours him.
