= Liberating Alaska =

- Short story by Harry Turtledove
- Country: United States
- Language: English
- Genre: Alternate history

Publication
- Published in: Isaac Asimov's Science Fiction Magazine
- Publication type: Print
- Publication date: June 19, 2018

"Liberating Alaska" is an alternate history short story by Harry Turtledove, published in the July/August 2018 issue of the Isaac Asimov's Science Fiction Magazine.

== Plot summary ==
The point of divergence occurs in 1876 when the United States never purchases Alaska from Russia. As a result, Alaska remains under Russian control until the Russian Civil War. As a consequence of the Allied intervention in the Russian Civil War and the U.S. fighting the Red Army in Siberia, Vladimir Lenin is forced to cede Alaska to the U.S.

The story is set in June 1929. Joseph Stalin initiates a take-over of the city of Siknazuak (real-life Nome with a variant of its Iñupiat name). The story depicts the liberation of Siknazuak by the United States Marine Corps.
