= Alaska Day =

U.S. holiday commemorating the Alaska Purchase

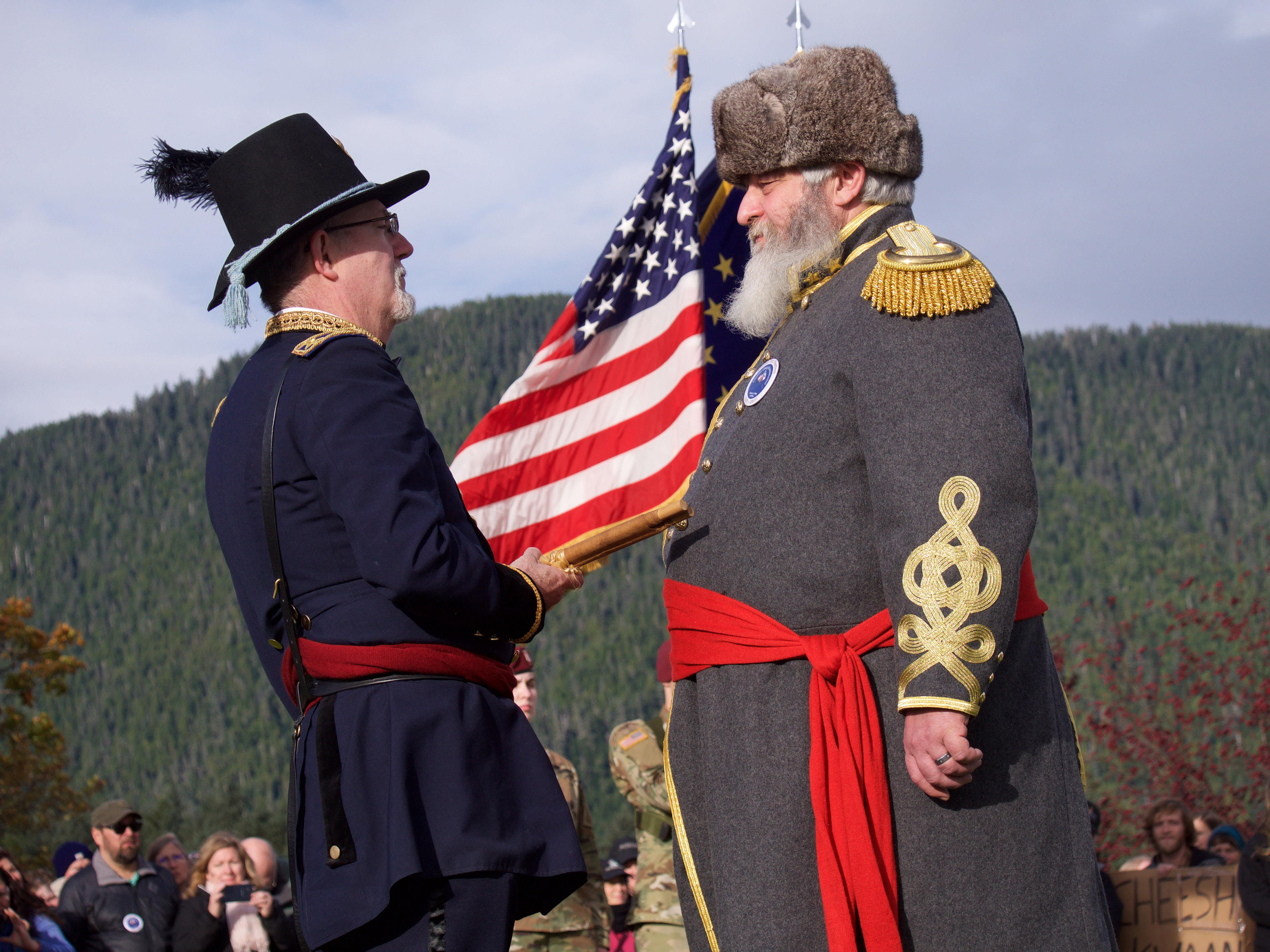
- Transfer ceremony reenactment in 2017
- Observed by: Alaskans
- Significance: Anniversary of the 1867 Alaska Purchase
- Observances: Parade in Sitka, paid holiday for employees in Alaska
- Date: October 18
- Next time: October 18, 2026
- Frequency: Annual
- Related to: Seward's Day

Alaska Day is a legal holiday in the U.S. state of Alaska, observed on October 18. It is the anniversary of the formal transfer of territories in present-day Alaska from the Russian Empire to the United States, which occurred on Friday, 18 October [O.S. 6 October] 1867.

== Background ==
On March 30, 1867, the United States purchased Alaska from the Russian Empire for the sum of $7.2 million, equivalent to $132 million in 2024. (Note: The inflation-adjusted value is calculated using the United States GDP deflator, which measures changes in the general price level of goods and services produced in the U.S. economy. This methodology accounts for overall economic growth and inflation since 1867.) It was not until October of that year that the commissioners arrived in Sitka and the formal transfer was arranged. The formal flag-raising took place at Fort Sitka on October 18, 1867. The original ceremony included 250 United States Army troops, who marched to the governor's house at "Castle Hill". There, the American soldiers raised the American flag, and the Russian flag was lowered.

The official account of the affair as presented by General Lovell Rousseau to Secretary of State William H. Seward:

... The troops being promptly formed, were, at precisely half past three o'clock, brought to a 'present arms', the signal given to the Ossipee ... which was to fire the salute, and the ceremony was begun by lowering the Russian flag ... The United States flag ... was properly attached and began its ascent, hoisted by my private secretary [and son], George Lovell Rousseau, and again salutes were fired as before, the Russian water battery leading off. The flag was so hoisted that in the instant it reached its place the report of the big gun of the Ossipee reverberated from the mountains around ... Captain Pestchouroff stepped up to me and said, "General Rousseau, by authority from his Majesty the Emperor of Russia, I transfer to the United States the Territory of Alaska" and in a few words I acknowledged the acceptance of the transfer, and the ceremony was at an end.

The transfer ceremony occurred on October 18, 1867, according to the Gregorian calendar used by the United States. However, Russia still used the Julian calendar at that time, which was 12 days behind the Gregorian calendar in the 19th century. Therefore, the date in the Russian calendar was October 6 (Old Style), though some sources cite October 7 due to the 11-hour time difference between Sitka and St. Petersburg.

== Observance ==
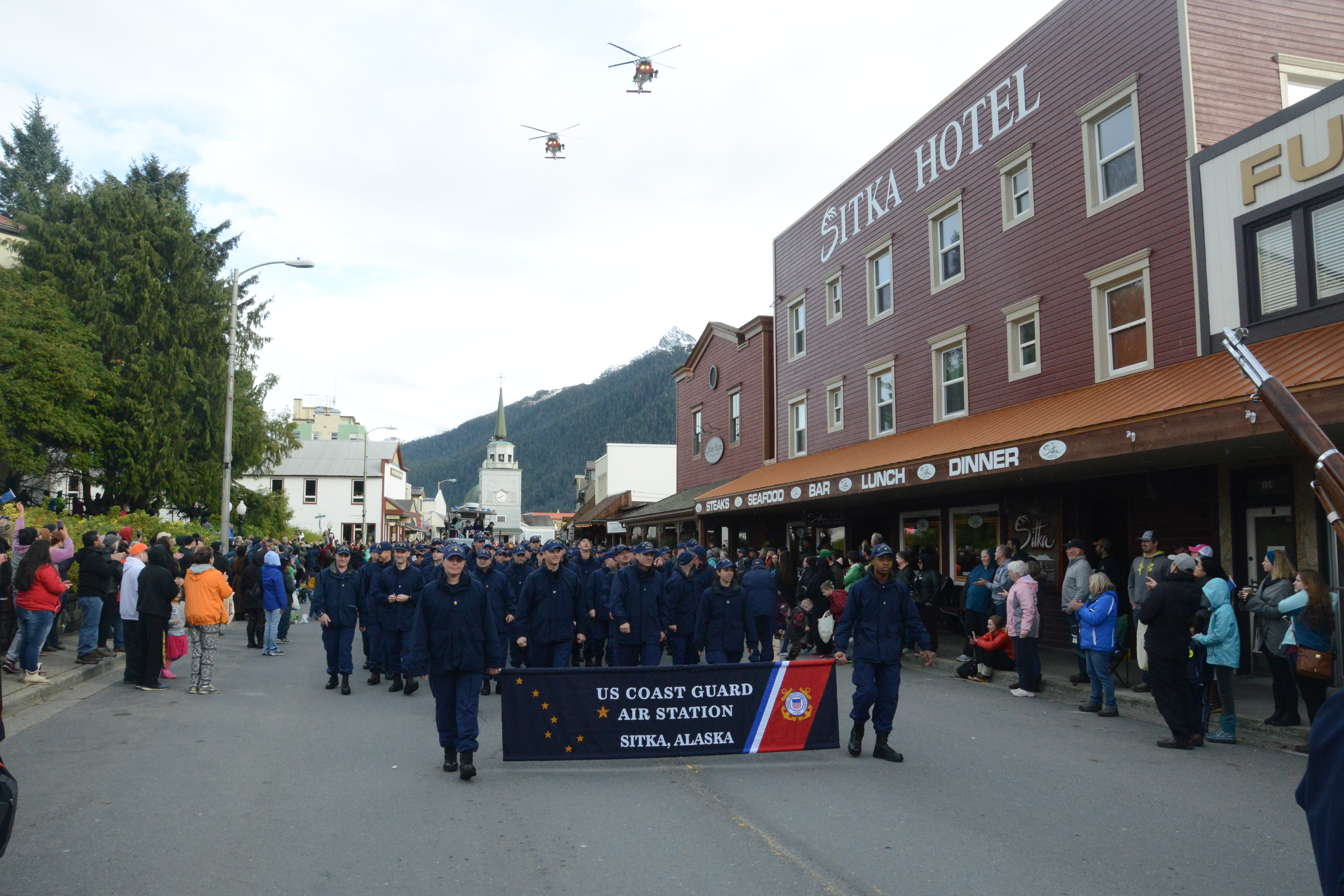
Coast Guard Air Station Sitka personnel and aircraft in the 2017 Alaska Day parade in Sitka

Alaska's territorial legislature declared Alaska Day a holiday in 1917. It is a paid holiday for state employees. The annual celebration is held in Sitka, where schools release students early, many businesses close for the day, and events such as a parade and reenactment of the flag-raising are held.

Alaska Day is distinct from Seward's Day, celebrated on the last Monday in March. Seward's Day commemorates the signing of the treaty for the Alaska Purchase in Washington, D.C. on March 30, 1867.

== Modern view ==
Alaska Day is observed by some Alaska Native people with mixed feelings or protest, as they view the holiday as celebrating events that resulted in significant impacts to their communities and sovereignty. Native organizers have asserted that the land was not Russia's to sell, as Indigenous peoples had inhabited the territory for thousands of years; therefore, they consider the sale of the land to the U.S. without Native consent to be illegitimate.

In recent years, some Alaska Native groups and community organizers have continued to hold events or discussions aimed at raising awareness of historical impacts, while local governments maintain October 18 as a legal holiday.

Some Alaska Natives have characterized the events surrounding the transfer and subsequent treatment of Indigenous peoples as forms of cultural genocide. In response to these concerns, Peter Bradley, a former resident of Sitka, formally proposed a resolution calling for the renaming of Alaska Day to Reconciliation Day, seeking to acknowledge both the historical significance of the transfer and the perspectives of Alaska Native communities.
