= The Veil (American TV series) =

1958 horror/supernatural anthology television series

- Genre: Supernatural; Mystery fiction
- Created by: Frank P. Bibas
- Narrated by: Boris Karloff (host)
- No. of seasons: 1
- No. of episodes: 12

Original release
- Release: 1958

The Veil is an American supernatural anthology television series hosted by and starring Boris Karloff and produced in 1958 by Hal Roach Studios, very similar to Alcoa Presents: One Step Beyond. The series was created by Frank P. Bibas (1917-1997).

Production was abandoned after a pilot and eleven episodes had been made, which were never broadcast nor shown in syndication. However the episodes were later compiled into three feature-length films which were broadcast on late night TV in the 1960s and later released to VHS home video.

The complete original series has since been released in its original format on DVD from Shout! Factory / Timeless Media retitled Tales of the Unexplained.

== Production ==
Episodes were screened at the annual Mid-Atlantic Nostalgia Convention in Aberdeen, Maryland.

The series was hosted by Karloff, who also acted in every episode but one (“Jack the Ripper”). Episode plots supposedly were based upon real-life reports of supernatural happenings and the unexplained. Ten of the 12 episodes begin and end with Karloff standing in front of a roaring Gothic fireplace and inviting viewers to find out what lies "behind the veil". Karloff began each episode with the following line: "Good evening. Tonight I'm going to tell you another strange and unusual story of the unexplainable which lies behind The Veil."

Guest stars (aside from Karloff) included Whit Bissell, George Hamilton, Myron Healy, Patrick Macnee, Morris Ankrum, Denise Alexander, Torin Thatcher, Niall MacGinnis and others. Directors included Herbert L. Strock, Frank P. Bibas, Paul Landres, Arthur Hiller and George Waggner.

Hailed by critics as "the greatest television series never seen" (according to DVD release publicity), The Veil was never broadcast. Troubles within the Hal Roach studio (and the collapse of a preliminary co-production arrangement with National Telefilm Associates) resulted in production being cancelled after only a pilot and 10 episodes were produced. Hal Roach purchased an additional episode called “Jack the Ripper” from a British TV studio in an attempt to fill out the series a bit, directed separately in England by David MacDonald, but the number of episodes was still considered too small to justify sale to a network or to syndication.

In the late 1960s, ten of the episodes were combined to form 3 different feature-length anthology films that aired on late night television. The three films were as follows:

- The Veil (features 3 episodes): "Vision in Crime", "The Doctors", and "The Crystal Ball"
- Jack the Ripper (features 4 episodes): "Jack the Ripper", "Food on the Table", "Genesis" and "Summer Heat"
- Destination Nightmare (features 3 episodes): "Destination Nightmare", "Girl on the Road" and "The Return of Madame Vernoy"

For many years, it was thought that only those 10 episodes of The Veil had been produced, and that two extra titles that were cited in reference sources ("The Vestris" and "Whatever Happened to Peggy?") were just "alternate titles". "The Vestris" was a backdoor pilot for The Veil which aired separately as a 1958 episode of ABC-TV's anthology series Telephone Time and thus was the only episode ever aired. “Whatever Happened to Peggy?” disappeared from all three of the later VHS video compilations.

Those same ten episodes were only released on VHS home video in their original format for the first time in the 1990s, and were subsequently released on DVD by Something Weird Video. These collections included neither the pilot (“The Vestris”) nor “Whatever Happened to Peggy?”.

However, in 2008, Timeless Media Group released a two-DVD set of The Veil, retitled Tales of the Unexplained, which included "The Vestris" and "…Peggy" for a total of 12 episodes. Any DVD sets that are entitled The Veil however do not include those two episodes.

In 1999, "Lifting the Veil of Mystery", a Tom Weaver article on the making of the series (complete with episode guide), appeared in issue #29 of Cult Movies magazine. It was later expanded into the book Scripts from the Crypt: The Veil (BearManor, 2017) which featured the series' history, scripts of several episodes, interviews with some of the participants, and a chapter on Boris Karloff's career as a TV anthology host. Contributors included Tom Weaver, Dr. Robert J. Kiss, and Barbara Bibas Montero, the daughter of the series' creator-producer, Frank Bibas.

All episodes other than the pilot have aired in New Zealand on Tubi.

== Episodes ==
There are a total of 12 episodes in the series. There is no actual airing order, since only the pilot actually aired. (All episodes star Boris Karloff except for Jack the Ripper and all episodes hosted by Boris Karloff except for The Vestris which was hosted by Frank Baxter)

No. overall	No. in season	Title	Directed by	Written by	Original release date
Pilot	TBA	"The Vestris"	Arthur Hiller	David Evans	February 25, 1958
(with Torin Thatcher and Rita Lynn); Note: This episode was a backdoor pilot that aired separately on Feb. 25, 1958 as an episode of the ABC-TV anthology show Telephone Time [Note an alternative title was "The Ship of No Return" based on the Alexander Keith Jr. insurance fraud/murders]
TBA	TBA	"Vision of Crime"	Herbert L. Strock	Fred Schiller	TBA
(with Robert Hardy, Patrick Macnee and Jennifer Raine)
TBA	TBA	"Girl on the Road"	George Waggner	George Waggner	TBA
(with Tod Andrews and Eve Brent)
TBA	TBA	"Food on the Table"	Frank P. Bibas	Jack Jacobs	TBA
(with Kay Stewart and Tudor Owen)
TBA	TBA	"The Doctor"	George Waggner	David Evans	TBA
(with Tony Travis and Argentina Brunetti)
TBA	TBA	"The Crystal Ball"	Herbert L. Strock	Robert L. Joseph	TBA
(with Booth Colman and Roxane Berard)
TBA	TBA	"A Chapter of Genesis"	George Waggner	Sidney Morse	TBA
(with Katherine Squire, Peter Miller and Morris Ankrum)
TBA	TBA	"Summer Heat"	George Waggner	Rik Vollaerts	TBA
(with Harry Bartell and Paul Bryar)
TBA	TBA	"The Return of Madame Vernoy"	Herbert L. Strock	Stanley H. Silverman	TBA
(with Lee Torrance, Jean del Val and George Hamilton)
TBA	TBA	"Destination Nightmare"	Paul Landres	Ellis Marcus	TBA
(with Ron Hagerthy and Myron Healey)
TBA	TBA	"Whatever Happened to Peggy?"	Herbert L. Strock	Stanley H. Silverman	TBA
(with Denise Alexander, Whit Bissell and Olive Blakeney)
12	TBA	"Jack the Ripper"	David MacDonald	Michael Plant	TBA
(with Niall MacGinnis and Dorothy Alison; produced by a British studio and purchased to fill out the series)
