= Alaska payment conspiracy =

Conspiracy theory

The Alaska payment conspiracy (Russian: Аляскинский платежный заговор, romanized: Ali͡askinskiĭ platezhnyĭ zagovor), also known as the Orkney conspiracy (Russian: заговор Оркни), is a conspiracy theory that the Russian Empire never received payment for the Alaska purchase from the United States, and that instead the ship, the Orkney, that carried the payment in gold was detonated for insurance money by Alexander 'Sandy' Keith, a con artist and explosives expert. This conspiracy theory has been debunked in several ways.

== The conspiracy ==
The Orkney supposedly sank in the Baltic Sea, en route from London to St. Petersburg, then the capital of the Russian Empire. Alexander Keith, who was known by several aliases, including William Thompson, had experience previously exploding ships to claim insurance money in Europe. His most well-known was that of the Mosel which occurred later. It has also been suggested that Keith may have been involved in the sinking of at least two other ships - the SS City of Boston and the Marie Victoria.

In 2014, Russian politician, Vladimir Zhirinovsky, of the Liberal Democratic Party of Russia has brought up these claims, as well as the bribery related to the deal.

== Explanation ==
There are several pieces of evidence that contradict this conspiracy theory.

As a start, the money was used to buy railroad equipment that was intended for Kursk-Kiev, Ryazan, Kozlovsky, Moscow-Ryazan and other railway lines. This suggests the funds were spent immediately, suggesting that it would not be possible for it to have been sent in gold.

For the Russian possessions in North America ceded to the North American States, 11,362,481 rubles 94 kopecks were received from the aforementioned deal. 10,972,238 rubles 4 kopecks of them were redirected and spent abroad for the purchase of accessories and equipment for the construction of the following railroads: Kursk-Kiev, Ryazan-Kozlov, Moscow-Ryazan, etc. The remaining 390,243 rubles and 90 kopecks have been received in cash in the Imperial Treasury.

— Archived State Treasury document

Secondly, according to the conspiracy theory, the Orkney exploded before the money was due. It is claimed that the ship was sunk in mid-July 1868, while the payment was supposed to be delivered on 1 August 1868. Furthermore, there is no record of a ship called the Orkney going missing, only a similarly named ship called Orkney Lass, which was registered after the events as still in operation and was supposedly travelling to South America that year, not St. Petersburg. No gold has ever been found in the Baltic Sea.

Lastly, bombs were very complicated to make at the time and Keith Jr. would spend a lot of time to prepare one. There are also conflicting stories about how Keith became involved—one story claims he was approached while living in Germany, the other says he thought of the scheme while working as a stevedore in England. Finally, there is a lack of evidence to connect Keith to the bombing, only that he was involved in the Mosel bombing a decade later.

== In fiction ==
- Forty-Ninth (2021): Historical novel written by Boris Pronsky and Craig Britton that fictionalizes the events prior to, during and after the conspiracy.
- The Dynamite Fiend (2005): A book written by Ann Larabee that examines the life of Alexander Keith and his criminal career, including the bombing of the Mosel, and mentions the conspiracy theory involving the Orkney.

== See also ==
- Alaska Purchase
