= Gavriil Antonovich Katakazi =

Russian diplomat

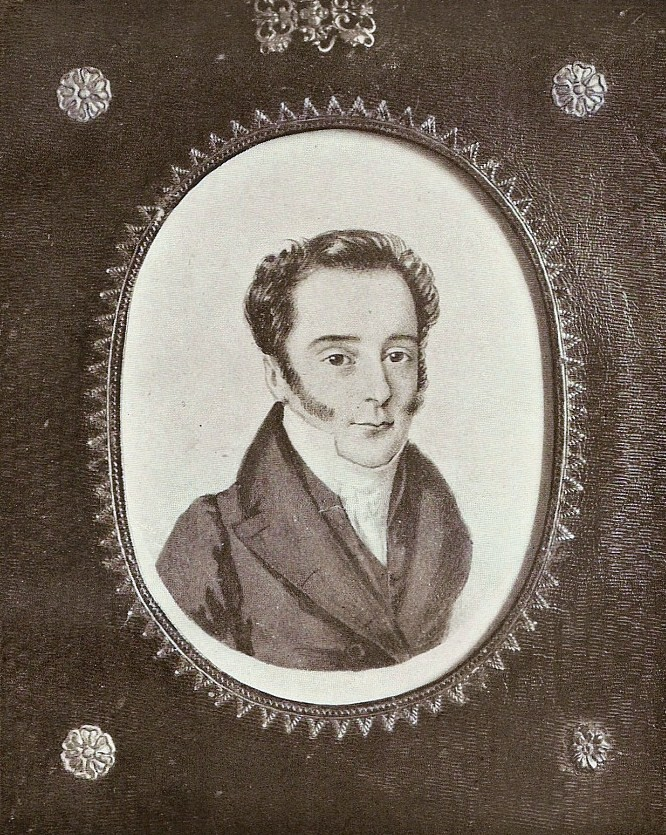
- G. A. Catacazy in 1820
- Born: 17 July 1794; Constantinople, Ottoman Empire
- Died: 25 April 1867 (aged 72); Harkov, Russian Empire
- Occupations: diplomat, politician
- Awards: Order of Saint Anna, 2nd class

Gavriil Antonovich Katakazi (Russian: Гавриил Антонович Катакази, Greek: Γαβριήλ Κατακάζης; 17 July 1794 – 25 April 1867) was a Russian diplomat and Active Privy Councillor of Greek origin, also notable as the father of Konstantin Katakazi, Russian ambassador to the United States.

== Life ==
From a Phanariote family, he was appointed to the Russian embassy in Istanbul in 1816. He served as the foreign ministry representative to the Russian navy on the expedition that culminated in the battle of Navarino on 8 November 1826, during which he was on board the ship Azov. In 1833 he was sent on a special mission to Bavaria and in August that year was appointed envoy extraordinary to the Bavarian Otto I of Greece. He earned Otto's respect and maintained good relations between Russia and the new independent Greek state. In 1843 he was recalled to Saint Petersburg and retired, but two years later he was taken back on by the foreign ministry. In 1847 he was made a senator of the Russian Empire, where he acted as an advisor on the Ottoman Empire and the Balkans, playing an active part in the negotiations which ended the Crimean War.

In 1855 he was appointed as a trustee of the Kharkov Academic District. He worked at this capacity for one year, after which he returned to St. Petersburg. He continued in his senatorial position until his death.

== Death ==
In the summer of 1866, on the way to the cottage in Tsarskoye Selo, due to the negligence of the coachman, Katakazi was thrown out of the carriage, as a result injuring his eye. This injury resulted in pain and inflammation of the eye. In April 1867, few weeks after the original injury, he died from cancer of the right eye. He was buried at the Lazarevskoe Cemetery of the Alexander Nevsky Lavra.

== Family life ==
In August 1826, when he was 32 years old, he married Sofya Khristoforovna Komneno (1806-1882). Komneno was the daughter of a Greek general Khristofor Komneno. In 1824, she graduated from Russia's first female educational institution, Smolniy Institute (founded in 1764).

According to her grandchildren, Sofya Katakazi was an excellent musician and could sing very well. She was a cheerful person. Her tastes and her education were very much Russian. While living with her husband in Greece, her position in the Athenian society was almost on par with Queen Amelia. Their house was lavish and their hospitality was famous in Athens.

The teacher of their children was the German poet and playwright Emanuel Geibel. The last years of her life were spent in Paris, where she died from the encephalitis,- inflammation of the brain. She was buried at Passy Cemetery.

== Children ==
- Mariya Gavrilovna (1827—1901), married to Vasiliy Sergeevich Neklyudov(1818—1880). Their son Anatoliy Vasilyevich Neklyudov was a diplomat and served as a Privy Councillor.
- Konstantin Gavrilovich (1828—1890), diplomat, served as minister plenipotentiary of the Russian Empire to the United States.
- Elena Gavrilovna (1831—1892), not married.
- Lev Gavrilovich(1832—1865), lawyer, secretary of the Ministry of the Imperial Court.
- Elizaveta Gavrilovna (1836— ?), married to Major-General Nikolai Vasilyevich Esipov.
- Aleksandra Gavrilovna (1837—1881), not married. Died in France.
- Anna Gavrilovna (1843—1874), married to Roman Semyakin (died 1875, son of Admiral K.R. Semyakin).
- Yuliya Gavrilovna (1845—1912), not married.

== Sources ==
- (in Russian) Russian diplomats → Katakazi, G. A.
