= Alexander de Bodisco =

Russian Minister to the United States (1786–1854)

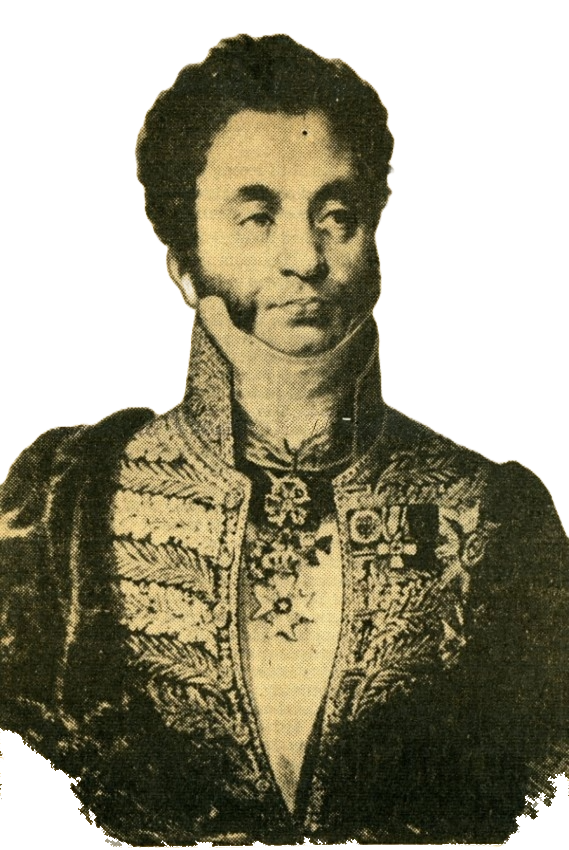

Russian Minister to the United States
- In office March 16, 1837 – January 23, 1854
- Preceded by: Paul von Krüdener
- Succeeded by: Eduard de Stoeckl

Personal details
- Born: October 30, 1786 Moscow, Russia
- Died: January 23, 1854 (aged 67) Georgetown, Washington, D.C., U.S.
- Resting place: Oak Hill Cemetery; Washington, D.C., U.S.
- Spouse: Harriet Beall Williams (m. 1840)
- Children: 7
- Occupation: Diplomat; landowner

Alexander de Bodisco (sometimes Alexander Bodisco) (October 30, 1786 – January 23, 1854) was the Russian ambassador to the United States from 1837 to his death in 1854. In 1840, at the age of 53, he married the 16-year old Harriet Beall Williams, which was a popular subject of gossip in Washington, D.C., at the time.

== Early life ==
Alexander de Bodisco was born on October 30, 1786, in Moscow, Russia. He was born as a Wallachian noble.

== Career ==
His career started in the Bureau of the Minister of Foreign Affairs in Saint Petersburg, Russia. In 1814, de Bodisco went to Paris and then attended the Congress of Vienna with Count Jan Pieter van Suchtelen. Afterward, Count Suchtelen was appointed the Russian Envoy and de Bodisco became Secretary of Legation at Stockholm. After Count Suchtelen died, he became the charge d'affaires at Stockholm. de Bodisco served as Russian ambassador to the United States from 1837 until his death. He was succeeded by Eduard de Stoeckl.

== Personal life ==
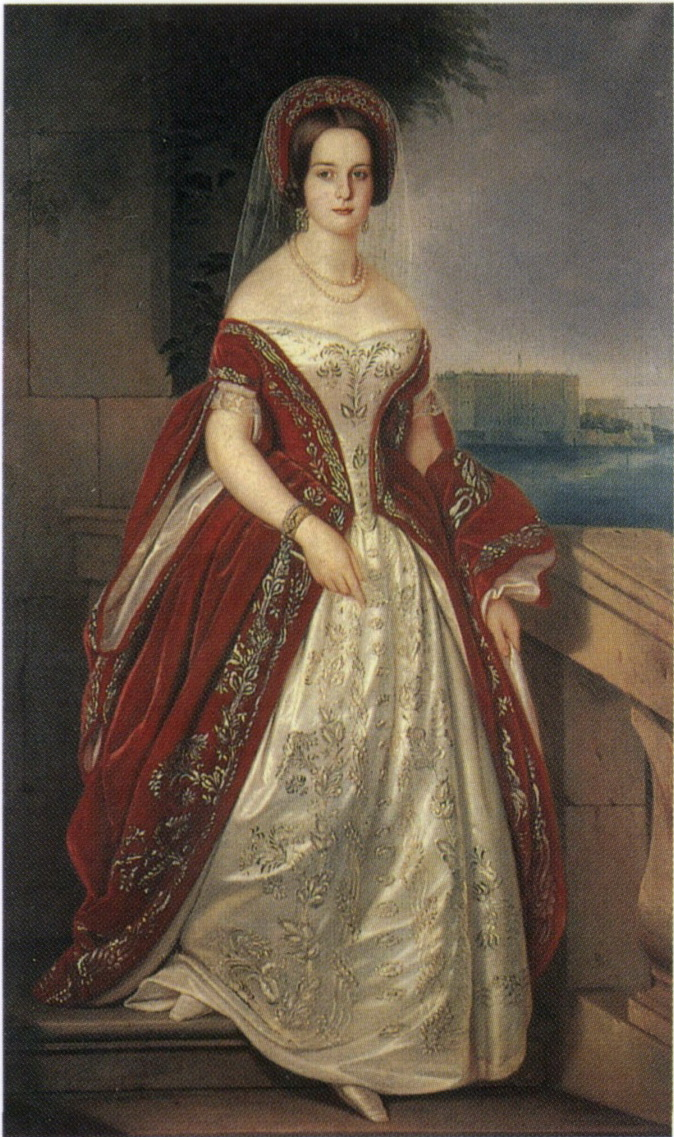
Portrait of Harriet Bodisco (1844)

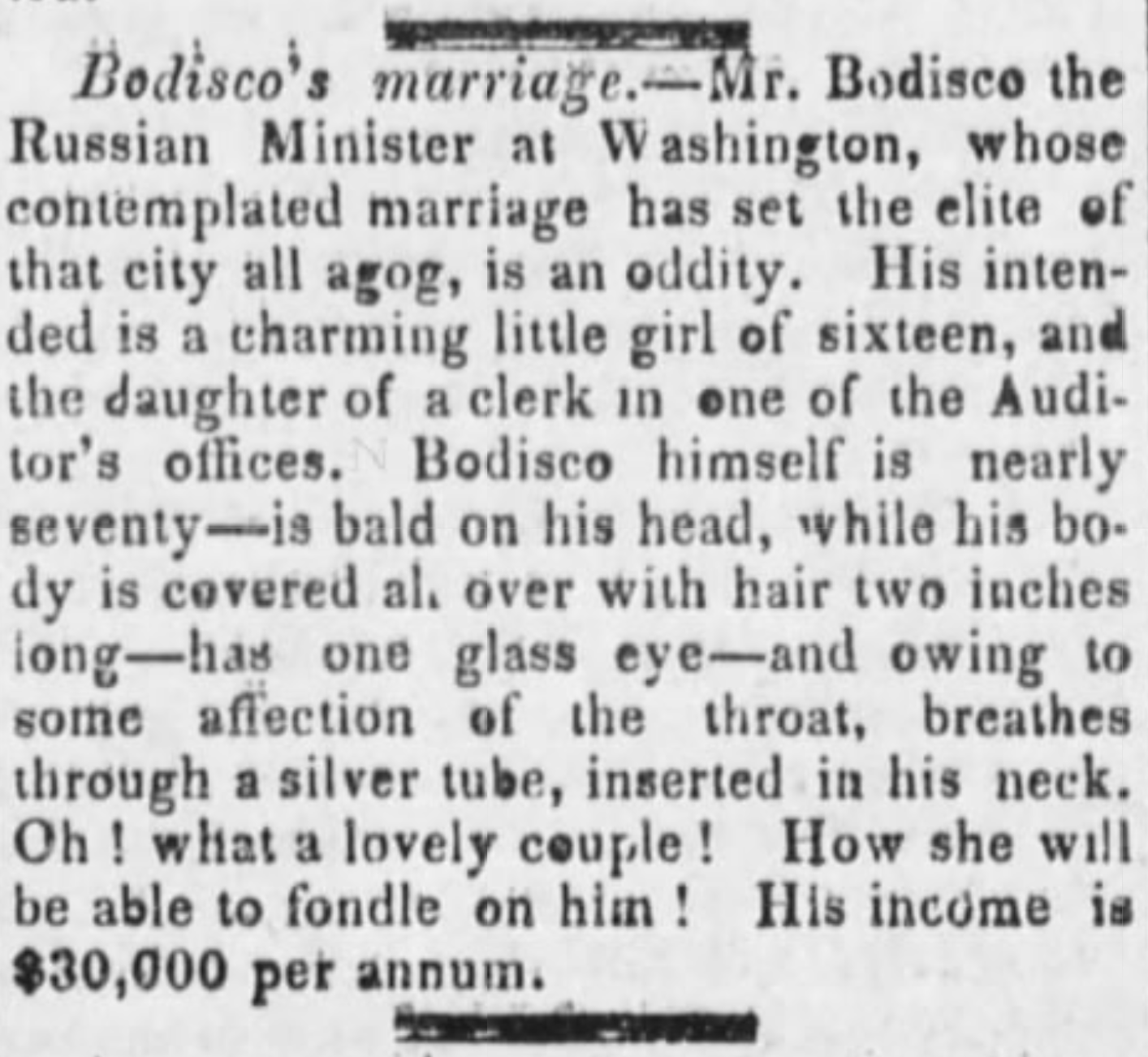
Passage in The Columbia Democrat on March 21, 1840, referencing the de Bodisco–Williams engagement

de Bodisco married Harriet Beall Williams, of Washington, D.C., on April 9, 1840. She was descended from two well known families in Georgetown, the Brookes and the Bealls. She was 16 years old and he was 53 years old at the time of their marriage. The age difference caused considerable gossip in Washington, D.C., and elsewhere. The wedding was at St. John's Episcopal Church and was attended by famous people of the time, including U.S. President Martin Van Buren, future U.S. President James Buchanan, Henry Clay and Jessie Benton Frémont. They had seven children. After his death, his wife remarried in 1860 to Captain Gordon Scott.

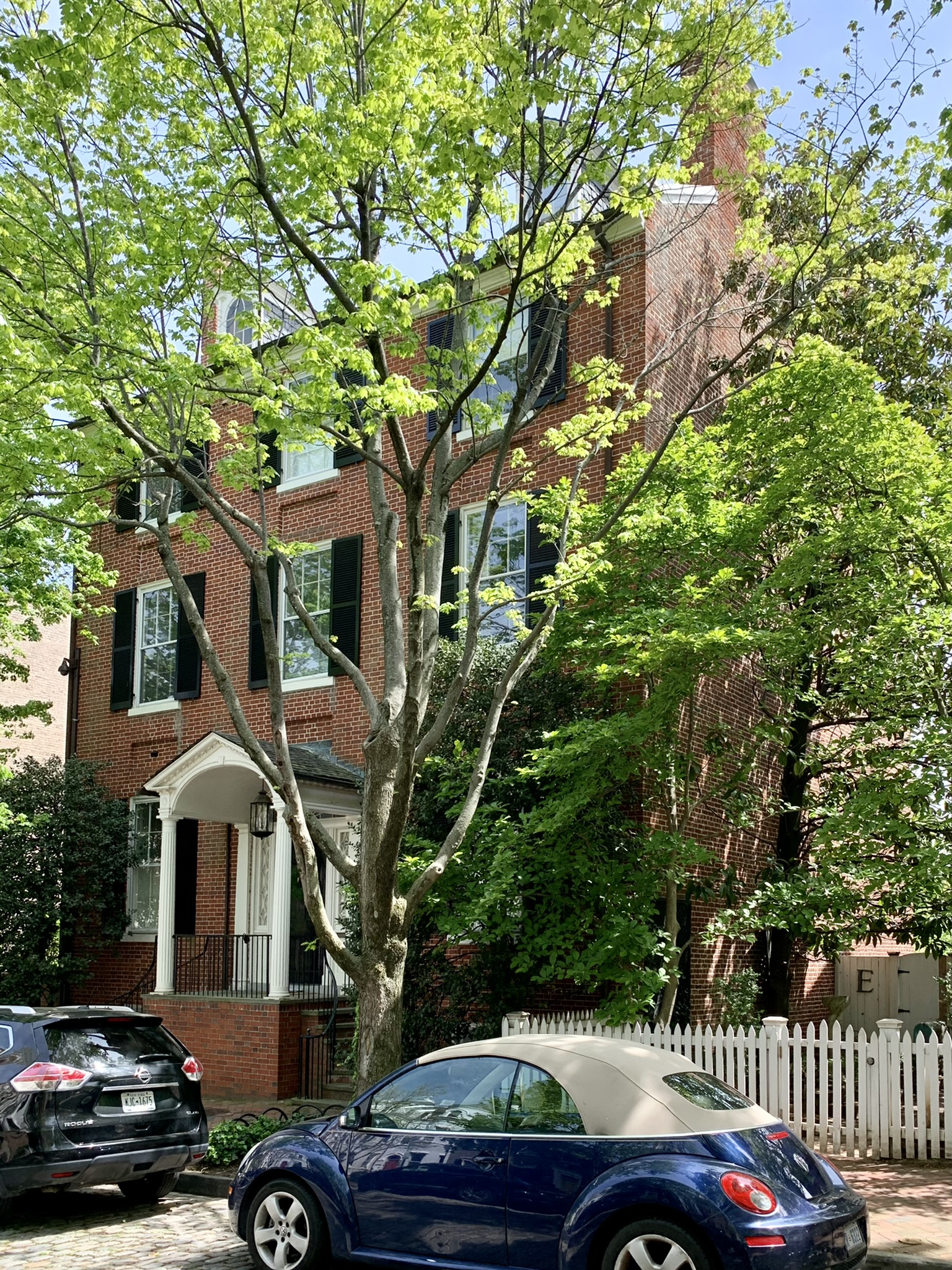
Bodisco House at 3322 O St. NW., in Washington, D.C. (2022)

In 1840, as a wedding present, he bought his wife the Bodisco House at 3322 O Street NW., in Washington, D.C. The house served as the Russian embassy for a time. His wife remained in the house after his death until she remarried in 1860.

de Bodisco purchased a parcel of land in 1845 in the modern day Crestwood neighborhood in Washington, D.C. He sold it before his death. He also owned another house at 3142 P Street.

He died on January 23, 1854, at his house in Georgetown. He was buried at Oak Hill Cemetery in Washington, D.C.
