= Eduard de Stoeckl =

Russian diplomat (1804–1892)

Your Excellency The Baron de Stoeckl PC (Rus)
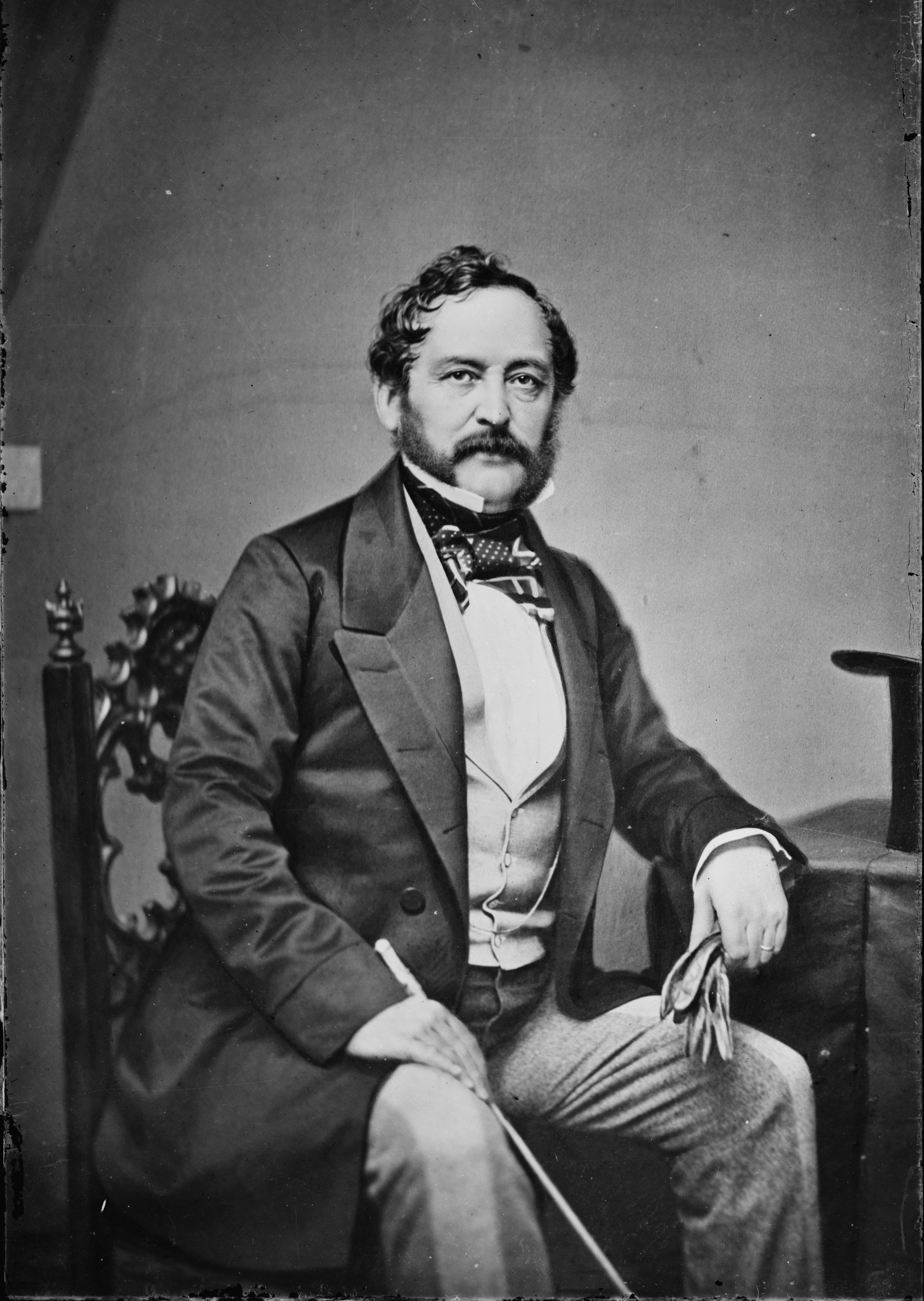
- Photograph of Baron de Stoeckl, by Mathew Brady, between 1855 and 1865

Ambassador of the Russian Empire to the United States
- In office 1855–1869
- Preceded by: Alexander Medem
- Succeeded by: Konstantin Katakazi

Personal details
- Born: Eduard Andreevich Stoeckl; 1804 Constantinople, Ottoman Empire
- Died: 26 January 1892 (aged 87–88) Paris, France
- Spouse: Eliza Howard (m. 1856; died 1892)
- Parent(s): Andreas von Stoeckl; Maria Pisani

Eduard Andreevich Stoeckl (Russian: Эдуард Андреевич Стекль; 1804 – 26 January 1892) was a Russian diplomat best known today for having negotiated the American purchase of Alaska on behalf of the Russian government.

== Early life ==
Eduard was born in 1804 in Constantinople, Ottoman Empire, where his father, Andreas von Stoeckl, was serving as an Austrian diplomat. His mother was Maria Pisani (daughter of Nicolas Pisani, Russian dragoman in Constantinople).

== Career ==
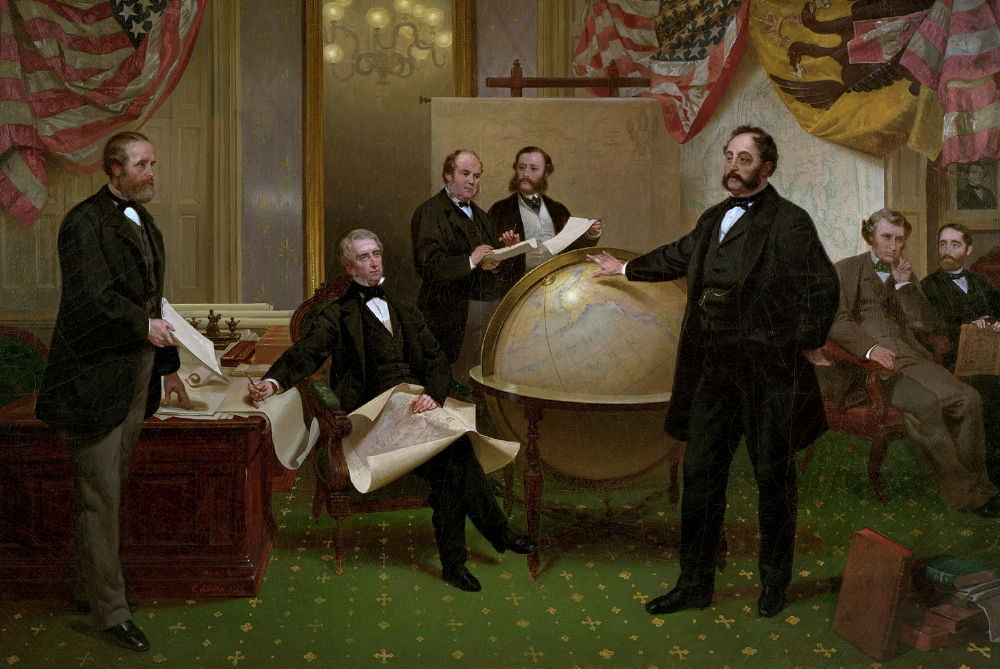
The Signing of the Alaska Treaty depicting the March 30, 1867 agreement to sell Alaska to the United States. L-R: Robert S. Chew, William H. Seward, William Hunter, Mr. Bodisco, Eduard de Stoeckl, Charles Sumner and Frederick W. Seward.

From 1844 to 1854, he served as secretary of the Russian Legation at Washington and, from 1849 to 1851, chargé d'affaires of the Russian embassy in Washington, and in 1854 held the post of minister, vacant after death of Aleksandr Bodisko.

Stoeckl established close friendly relations with many American officials and politicians, including the senator and the future Secretary of State William H. Seward, with whom he would later negotiate the Alaska Purchase.

Stoeckl advocated the sale of Alaska (then known as Russian America) to the United States, asserting that this would prevent the United Kingdom from seizing the territory in case of war between the two countries and would allow Russia to concentrate its resources on Eastern Siberia, particularly the Amur River area. He also insisted that by doing so, Russia would avoid any future conflict with the United States, viewing further U.S. expansion in North America as inevitable.

Stoeckl signed the Alaska Treaty in March 1867. For successfully carrying out the negotiation, Tsar Alexander II rewarded him with US$25,000 and an annual pension of $6,000.

Due to declining health, Stoeckl resigned in 1869 and was made a Knight of the Order of the White Eagle on 20 April 1869. During the Franco-Prussian War of 1870, he came to London and lived in the Claridge Hotel on Brook Street, London. He spent the final years of his life in France at 59 Boulevard Malesherbes, Paris where he died in 1892.

== Personal life ==
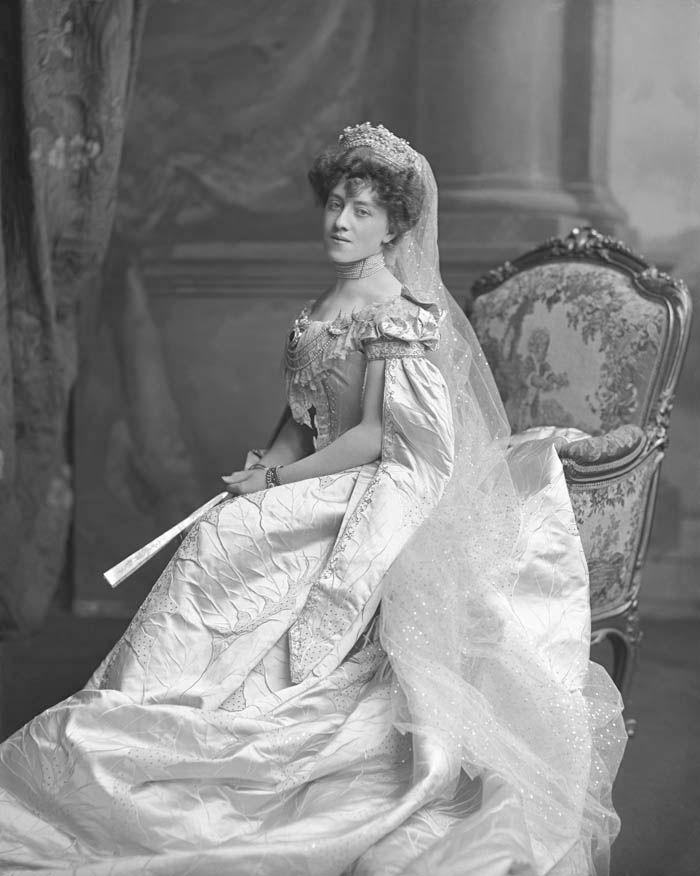
Photograph of his daughter-in-law, Agnes Barron, 1902

Like his predecessor as Minister to the United States, Stoeckl married an American woman, Eliza Wetmore Howard (1826–1913), a daughter of lawyer John Howard and Mary Stoddard (née Dwight) Howard of Springfield, Massachusetts, on 2 January 1856.

Stoeckl died in Paris on 26 January 1892. His widow lived at 3 Rue de Logelbach in Paris.

The couple was survived by their son, Alexandre de Stoeckl (1862–1926), who married heiress Agnes Barron, a daughter of Capt. William Barron and Fanny Louisa Lonergan, in 1892. Alexandre was attaché to the Russian Embassy in London, equerry to Grand Duke Michael Mikhailovich, and chamberlain to Emperor Nicholas II.

=== Descendants ===
Through his son, he was posthumously a grandfather of Zoia de Stoeckl (b. 1893), who married Alfons Aleksander Koziełł-Poklewski (a grandson of Alfons Koziełł-Poklewski), a member of the Polish nobility. Zoia was a friend of Princess Marina, Duchess of Kent.

== In fiction ==
Eduard de Stoeckl is a character in the historical novel Forty-Ninth by Boris Pronsky and Craig Britton.

== Bibliography ==
- Marie de Testa & Antoine Gautier, Le diplomate russe Eduard de Stoeckl (ca 1805-1892) et la cession de l'Alaska aux Etats-Unis, in Drogmans et diplomates européens auprès de la Porte ottomane, éditions ISIS, Istanbul, 2003, pp. 463–469.
