= Signing of the Alaska Treaty =

Painting by Emanuel Leutze

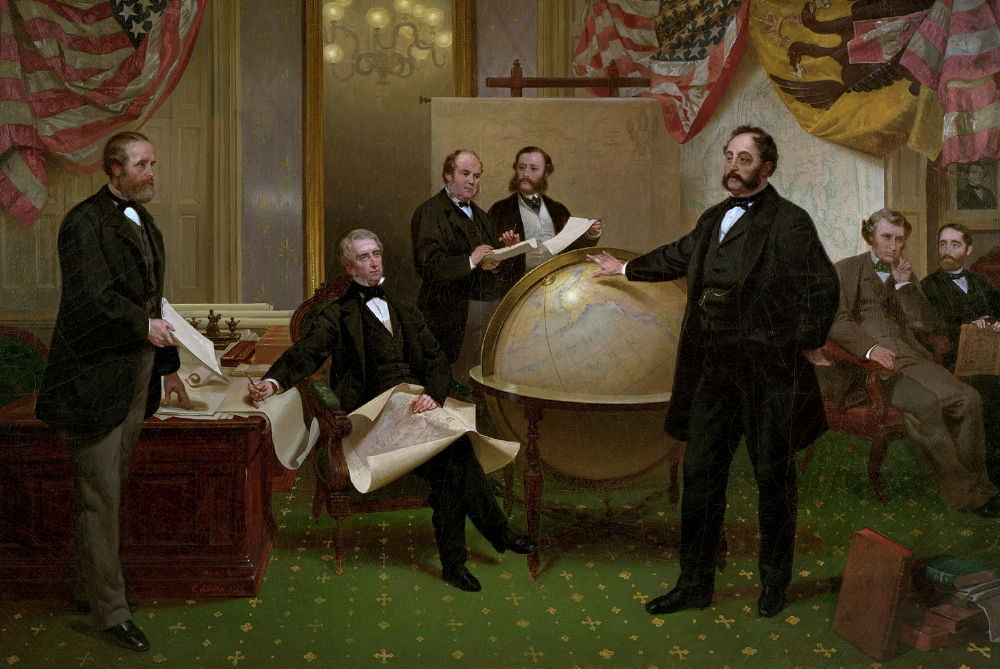
- Artist: Emanuel Leutze
- Year: 1867
- Medium: Oil on canvas
- Dimensions: 142.2 cm × 192.7 cm (4.67 ft × 6.32 ft)
- Location: Seward House Museum, Auburn

Signing of the Alaska Treaty is an oil on canvas painting by German American artist Emanuel Leutze, from 1867. The painting is owned by the Seward House Museum, in Auburn, New York state.

== Background ==
The painting depicts William Seward and Eduard de Stoeckl negotiating the details of Alaska's purchase by the United States.

== History ==
Signing of the Alaska Treaty was loaned to Alaska in 2017 for celebrations regarding the purchase of Alaska's 150th anniversary. The painting was shown at the Anchorage Museum, the Alaska State Museum, and the Museum of the North in the University of Alaska Fairbanks.
