= Thomas Disaster =

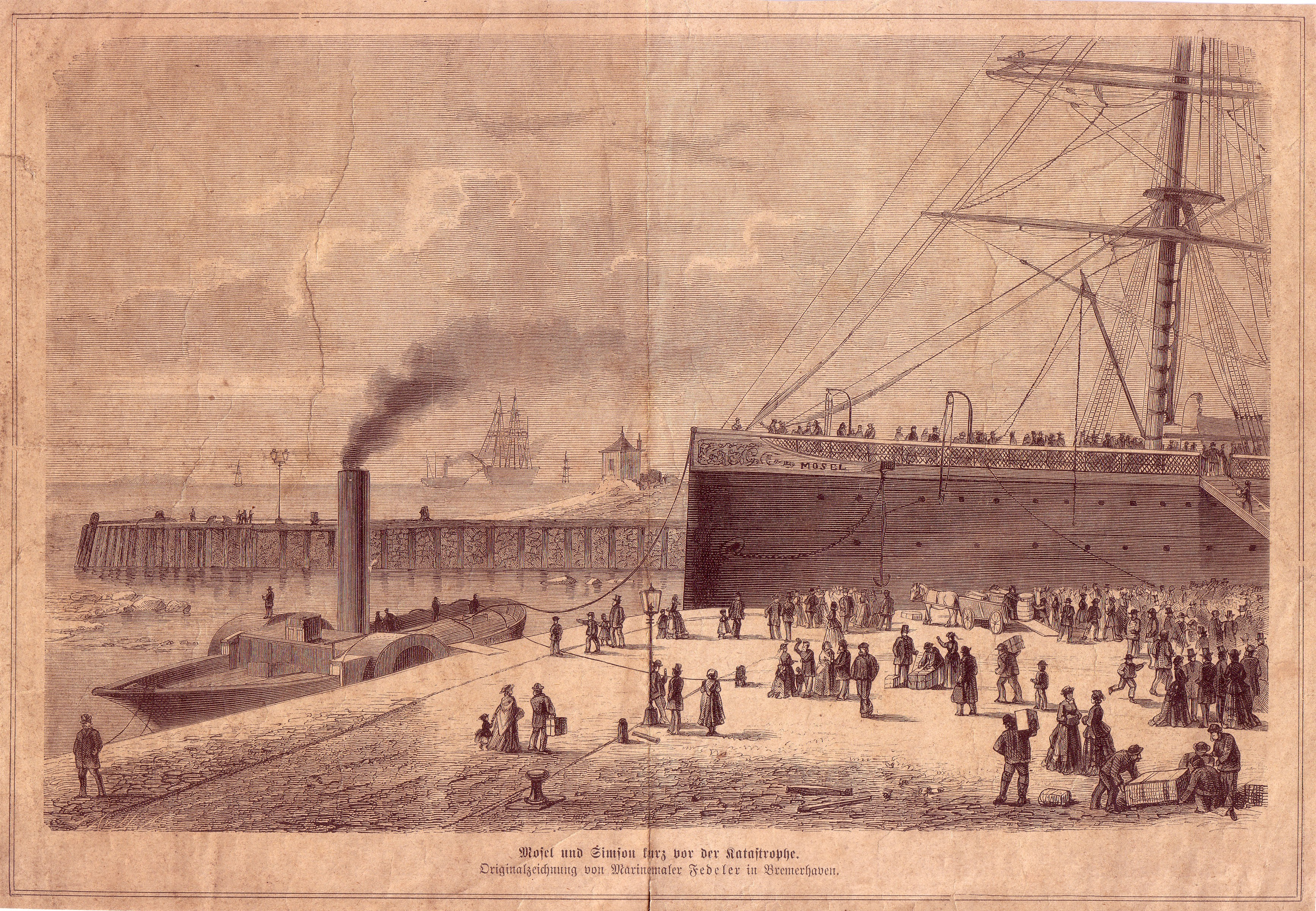
SS Mosel at the dock with the steam tug Simson just before the incident

The Thomas Disaster known in German media as Thomas-Katastrophe was an explosion incident involving the North German Lloyd steamer SS Mosel at the Bremerhaven docks on the 11 December 1875. It killed around 81 people and more than 200 were injured. It was the result of a dynamite-based explosive with a timing device that accidentally went off when the explosive package was loaded into the ship. The bombing was part of a plan to commit insurance fraud by the Canadian Alexander Keith Jr. who, at the time went by the name of Thomas or Thomassen. He shot himself shortly after the explosion and died a few days later, confessing to the crime during interrogations by the German police.

== Incident ==
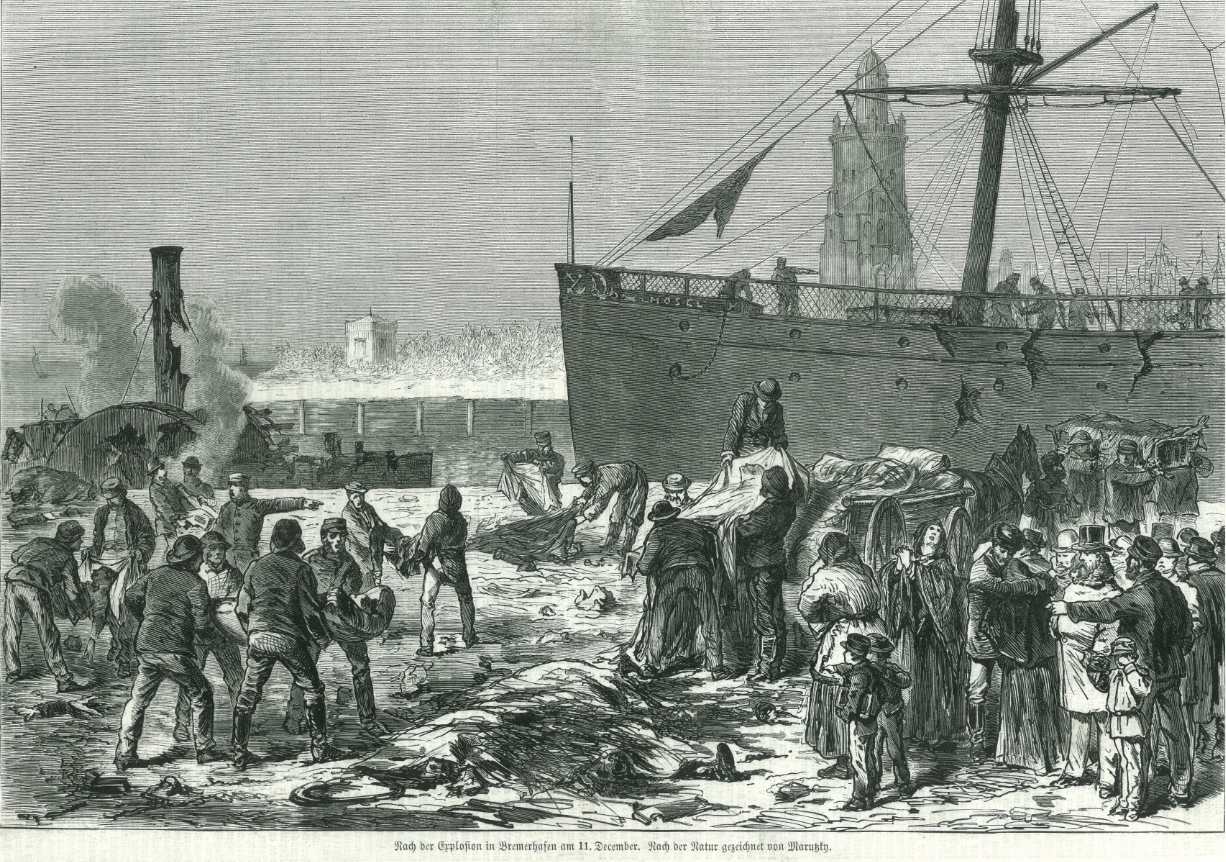
After the explosion

The steamship Mosel belonged to the North German Lloyd company and on December 11, 1875 it was to set off for New York under Captain Leist, the originally assigned captain Hermann Neynaber having taken ill. It had 400 passengers mostly from Germany who had already boarded and it was towed by the tug Simson and was being temporarily docked to load some cargo. A large number of onlookers were assembled including those that had come to bid farewell to the passengers. One of the large packages of cargo to be loaded was armoured in iron and weighed 650 kg (1,430 lb). It was claimed to contain caviar worth 3,000 marks. A large barrel which broke off from the cargo being lifted by the crane struck the pavement and exploded at 11 AM. The immense blast blew a hole in the ship and caused a 4-metre (13 ft) deep crater on the quay. The explosion was heard miles away and a large black cloud arose and many people lay screaming. Inspection of one of the cabins six hours later at 5 pm led to the finding of blood-covered passenger named William King Thomas in the first class cabins. Initially thought to be a passenger he was found with a pistol and he had shot himself twice but survived.

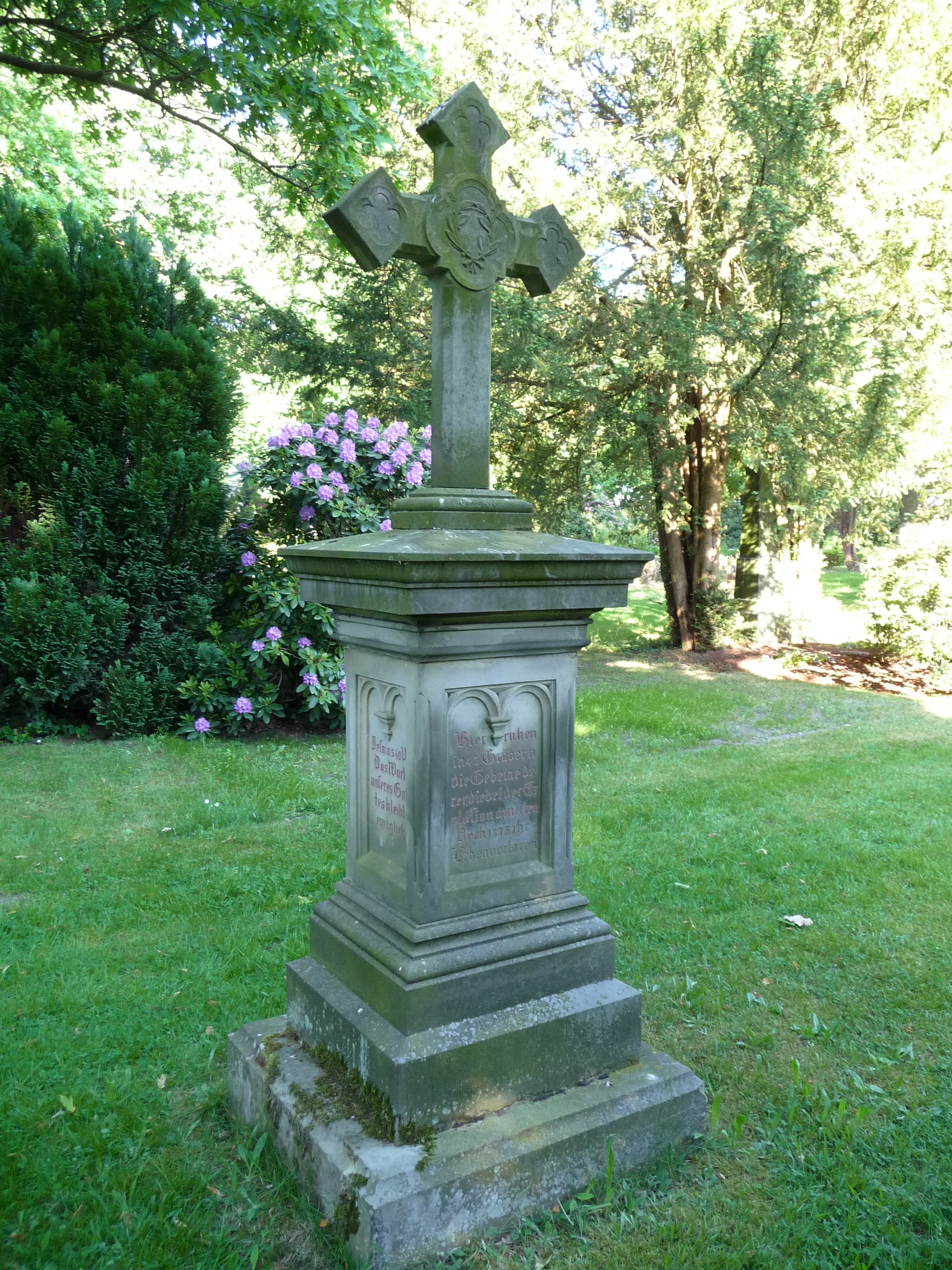
The memorial at the mass grave for unidentified victims at Wulsdorf

=== Plan ===
Investigators found that Thomas was in fact Alexander Keith Jr. from Halifax. He had fled the US following the misappropriation of money from numerous lenders and had tried to plan an insurance fraud to obtain money. In 1873 he obtained the services of watchmaker Johann Ignatz Fuchs (1821–1893) of Leipzig to design a timing device to fire a hammer to trigger the explosion of dynamite. He bought dynamite from Gebrüder Krebs in Cologne in 1875 claiming to be a mine owner in Jamaica. He shipped the bomb along with a load of junk cargo claimed to be caviar valued at 3,000 Reichmarks. His attempts to load the bomb barrel on another ship failed when the paymaster refused to let it without a personal inspection. His plan was to disembark in Southampton with the bomb set to explode eight days later. He intended to collect the accident insurance money in England.

=== Aftermath ===
Keith, fearing discovery tried to shoot himself but he ended up paralyzed. The police took him into custody and were able to question him. Two notes were found near him, one bidding farewell to his wife and children and the other to the captain regretting his action. During short periods of consciousness he admitted to being the owner of the barrel that had exploded. He died on 16 December at 4.30 PM. Over the days several of the injured died and not all bodies were recognizable. Of the 81 victims only 22 were identified and the remaining were placed in five mass graves at Wulsdorf in Bremerhaven. The body of Keith was buried but his head had been severed by a Bremerhaven doctor named Soldan and placed in a jar of alcohol, ostensibly for scientific research. The head was placed in the Museum of Crime in Bremen in 1914 and is reported (in 2017 to relatives) as being in the basement of the police department in Bremerhaven, and also publicly reported as being destroyed during World War II. The SS Mosel was repaired and was returned to service and was in use until it was wrecked on 9 August 1882 off Lizard, Cornwall. Pinkerton investigating agency was hired by the Germans to examine the insurance fraud and they produced a report which included Keith's earlier activities and attempts at fraud. The agency report was used by Ann Larabee to document the life of Keith in a 2005 book titled "The dynamite fiend".
