= Alexander Keith Jr. =

Scottish-born Canadian smuggler and mass murderer (1827–1875)

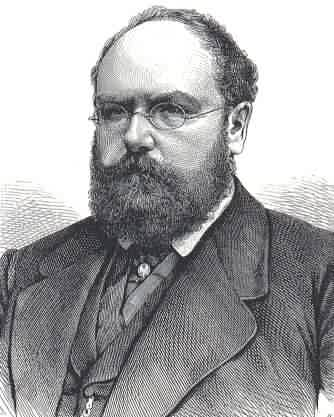
An illustration of Keith

Alexander "Sandy" Keith Jr. (1827 – December 16, 1875) was a Scottish-born Canadian smuggler and mass murderer. During the American Civil War, he was employed by the Confederate States of America as a spy, and after the war attempted to use a time bomb to destroy the merchant ship Mosel for insurance fraud in 1875, resulting in the deaths of 81 bystanders and his own suicide.

== Biography ==
Keith was born in 1827 in Caithness, Scotland, immigrating to Halifax, Nova Scotia when he was a small boy. The nephew of Halifax businessman Alexander Keith, he worked for a time as a clerk in his uncle's brewery. Apparently envious of the wealthier life his uncle lived, Keith Jr. was determined to make a name for himself by any means necessary. He began by scamming railroads by delivering cheap product instead of the expensive products he promised. During the American Civil War, when Halifax was home to many Confederate sympathizers, Keith acted mostly as a blockade runner and courier. He helped Confederate sympathiser George Wade escape arrest for the killing of an engineer during the Chesapeake Affair. Lewis Hutt had been instructed to await the sheriff releasing George Wade on the dock and re-arrest him for the United States, and stood waiting on the dock with the warrant in his left and pistol in his right hand - however the sheriff asked him to wait two or three minutes before re-arresting Wade during which time Wade slipped away onto a boat which began departing. As Hutt moved to intercept and take Wade into custody, Alexander Keith, Jr. and two others physically restrained him.

He was also involved with Luke Blackburn in a plot to send clothes infected with yellow fever to northern cities in the United States. In 1865, he swindled his associates-in-crime and fled to St. Louis, Missouri, settling finally on the prairie. There, he married Cecelia Paris, a milliner's daughter from St. Louis.

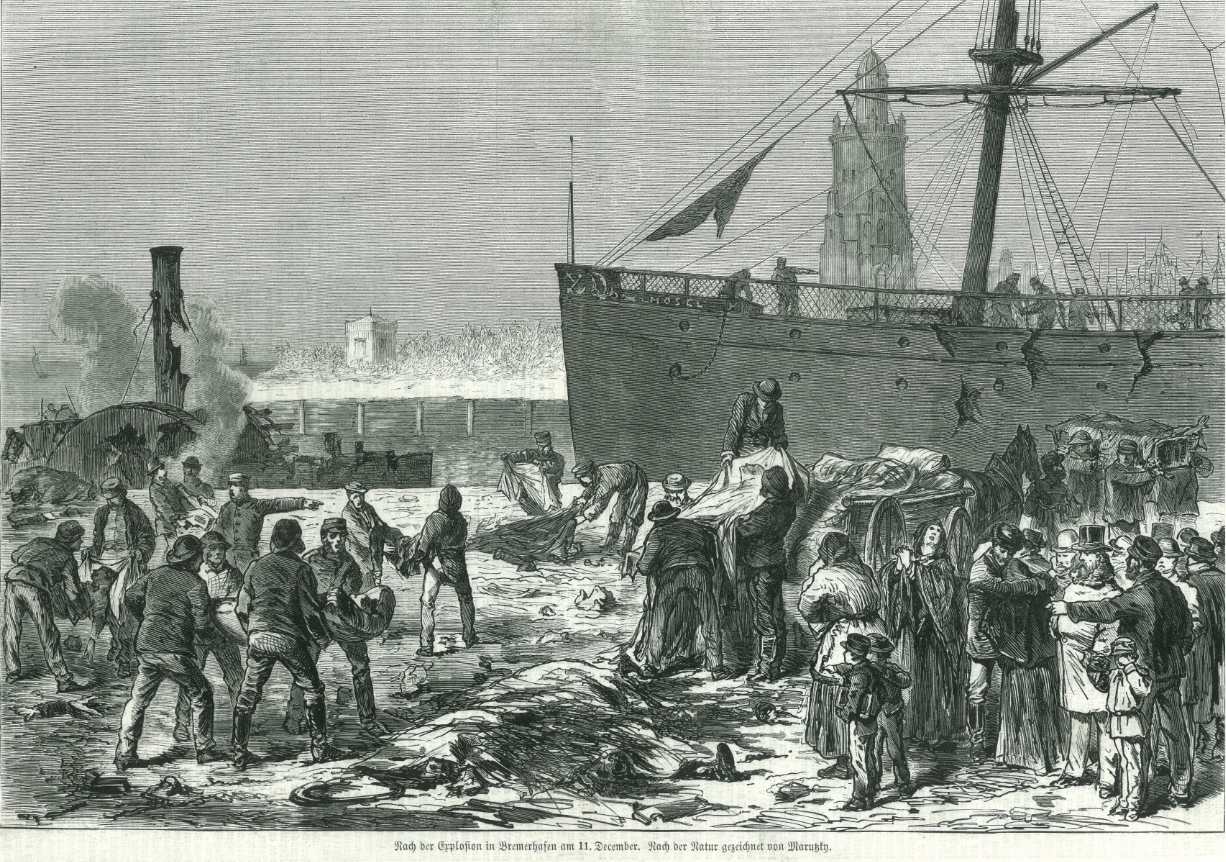
Aftermath of the Mosel bombing.

Hunted down by one of his victims, Keith fled again with Cecelia, this time to Germany. He hobnobbed with wealthy socialites and Saxon generals under the assumed name of "William King Thomas". When the couple began to run out of money, remembering a series of fraudulent insurance claims on blockade-running ships that sank at sea, Keith eventually determined to just destroy a ship himself. Using a variety of aliases, he set about purchasing timers and dynamite. He obtained around 150 British pounds of insurance for what he claimed was a barrel of caviar to complete his scheme.

Keith made his first attempt in June 1875, when he sent a filled barrel to New York on the Lloyd steamer Rhein which he insured for £9000; he followed the ship on the vessel Republic but upon arrival in New York, he discovered that the detonator had failed and the bomb had not exploded. In another attempt, the purser of the steamer Celtic refused to acknowledge receipt of a chest allegedly filled with dollar coins without first inspecting its contents.His initial target was a Norddeutscher Lloyd ship, the Mosel. This led to a major catastrophe in Bremerhaven in 1875, when a time bomb he had placed in the "caviar" barrel accidentally went off on the dock, killing 81 people. According to one witness: "A mushroom-shaped column of smoke rose approximately 200 meters above the harbor. Everywhere people were crying and whimpering beside ruins. The entire pier was covered in soot: it was like the gateway to hell." At the time, the deed was called the "crime of the century".

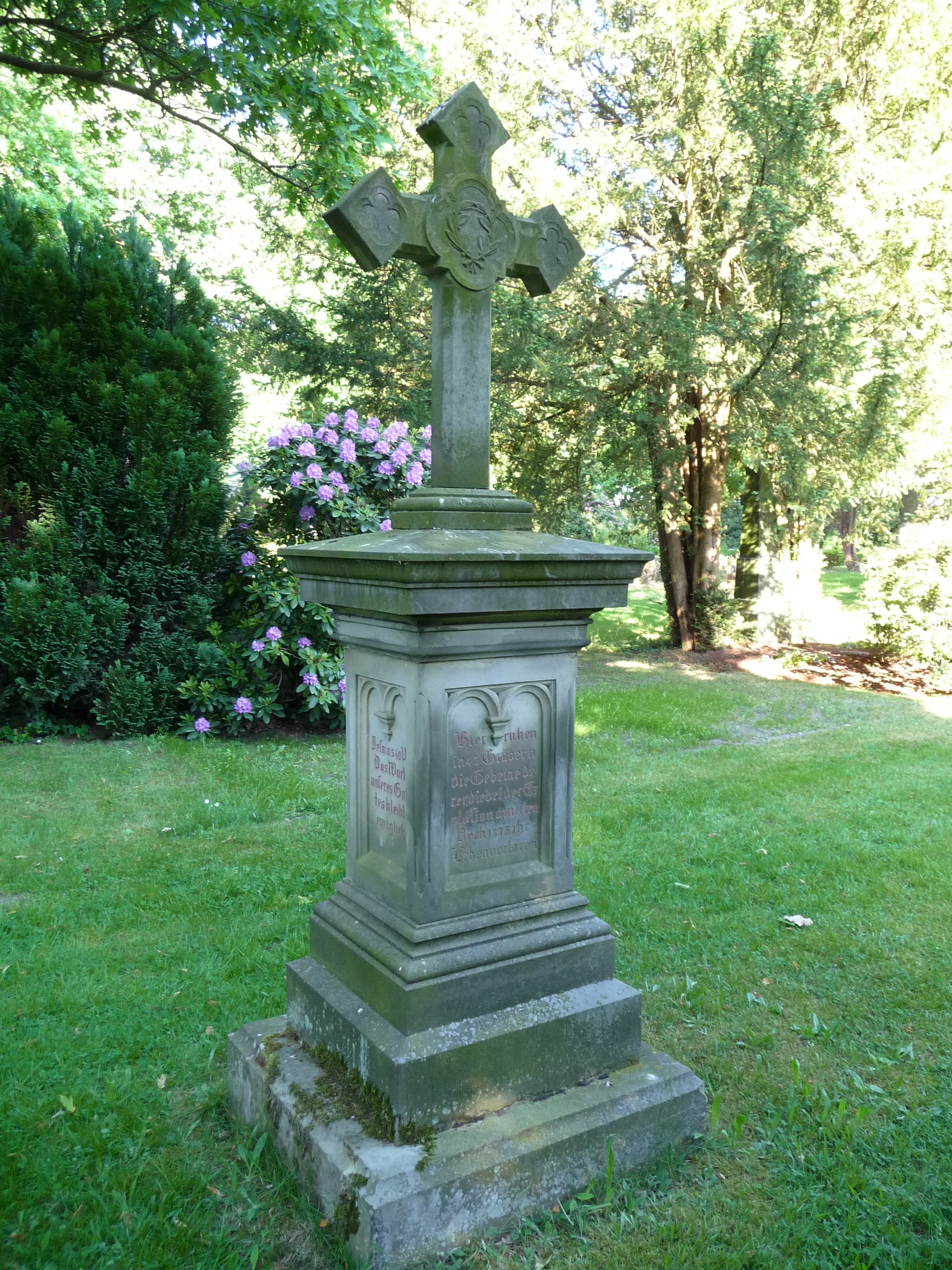
Monument to the 81 victims of the Thomas Crime in Bremerhaven's Wulsdorf Cemetery.

Keith was aboard another ship in Bremerhaven at the time of the Mosel explosion. He went to his suite and shot himself twice with a revolver, but survived for a week. After the tragedy was revealed as a murder/insurance scam on a large scale, the disappearances of other ships were investigated to see if Keith and his possible associates were involved. One was the disappearance of the SS City of Boston, which vanished in January 1870. The allegation was proven to be false. He was reputed to have been buried in an unmarked grave in Bremerhaven. His severed head was kept at the Bremer Police Museum and was destroyed by Allied bombing in 1945. Newspapers called it "The Thomas Crime".

Regarding his time bomb, Keith's biographer Ann Larabee wrote: "Keith was not responsible for the political passion of these violent political groups, but he played a role in showing them a means of action."

== On TV ==
In a series The Veil (1958), in an episode titled "The Ship of No Return" The episode depicts Keith (using the alias William King Thomas) placing a time bomb on the SS Mosel for insurance fraud.The Outcome: The bomb exploded prematurely on the dock in Bremerhaven, killing 81 people. After the disaster, Keith attempted suicide by shooting himself twice but survived long enough to confess to the police.

== In fiction ==
The Dynamite Fiend: The Chilling Story of Alexander Keith Jr., Nova Scotian Spy, Con-Artist, and International Terrorist by Ann Larabee was published in 2005. The book in turn inspired The Inventor, an opera by Bramwell Tovey and John Murrell that was performed by the Calgary Opera Company and Vancouver Symphony Orchestra in 2011.

Alexander Keith Jr. is also a character in Boris Pronsky and Craig Britton's novel Forty-Ninth, central for the execution of the Alaska Payment Conspiracy in the book. The character is introduced by the name of William Thompson, as it was one of the many aliases used by Keith.

== Sources ==
- Larabee, Ann (2005). The Dynamite Fiend: The Chilling Tale of a Confederate Spy, Con Artist, and Mass Murderer. Palgrave Macmillan. ISBN 9781403967947.
- Lotz, Pat (2002). Banker, Builder, Blockade Runner, A Victorian Embezzler and his Circle. Gaspereau Press. ISBN 9781894031646.
